= Srinagarindra =

Member of the Thai royal family (1900–1995)

Srinagarindra; ศรีนครินทรา
- Princess Mother of Thailand
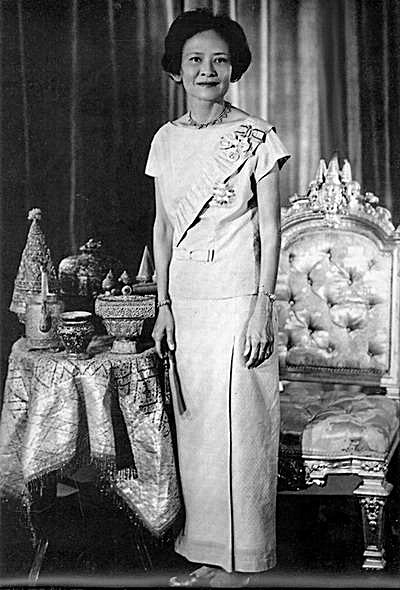
- Srinagarindra in 1957
- Born: Sangwan Chukramol; 21 October 1900; Nonthaburi, Siam
- Died: 18 July 1995 (aged 94); Bangkok, Thailand
- Burial: 10 March 1996; Sanam Luang, Bangkok
- Spouse: Mahidol Adulyadej (m. 1920; died 1929)
- Issue Detail: Galyani Vadhana, Princess of Naradhiwas; Ananda Mahidol (Rama VIII); Bhumibol Adulyadej (Rama IX)
- House: Mahidol (by marriage)
- Dynasty: Chakri (by marriage)
- Father: Chu Chukramol
- Mother: Kham Chukramol
- Religion: Theravada Buddhism

Srinagarindra (Note: Thai: ศรีนครินทรา; RTGS: Si Nakharinthra) (21 October 1900 – 18 July 1995) born Sangwan Talapat (Note: Thai: สังวาลย์ ตะละภัฏ; RTGS: Sangwan Talaphat) was a member of the Royal Thai Family. She was part of the House of Mahidol, which is descended from the Chakri dynasty and was founded by Prince Mahidol Adulyadej. She was the mother of Princess Galyani Vadhana, King Ananda Mahidol (Rama VIII), and King Bhumibol Adulyadej (Rama IX) and was the paternal grandmother of King Vajiralongkorn (Rama X).

Her formal name and title was Somdet Phra Srinagarindra Boromarajajonani (Note: Thai: สมเด็จพระศรีนครินทราบรมราชชนนี). In Thailand, she was affectionately called Somdet Ya (Thai: สมเด็จย่า), "the Royal Grandmother". The various hill tribe people, to whom she was a special patron, called her Mae Fah Luang (Thai: แม่ฟ้าหลวง), "Royal Mother from the Sky" or "The Heavenly Royal Mother".

== Early life ==
Sangwan Chukramol was born on 21 October 1900 in Nonthaburi Province. Her family was of Laotian descent from Vientiane. By the age of nine, Sangwan's parents and her elder brother and sister had all died, leaving her and her younger brother, Thomya, in the care of their aunt. Their aunt and guardian, Suay, earned a living by making sweets and rolling cigarettes.

Sangwan's mother had taught her to read before her death. With this skill, Sangwan enrolled at an all-girls school at Wat Anongkharam, a nearby temple whose abbot recognized the need for girls to receive a proper education. She later studied at Suksanari School but left after only a month due to a lack of funds. Nevertheless, she maintained her reading habits by regularly visiting her aunt's friend, who operated a book-rental library. She read several Thai classics, including Inao, Phra Aphai Mani, and Sangsilchai.

At the suggestion of a relative, Sangwan was sent to live with Chan Saeng-xuto, another relative who served as a nanny to Princess Valaya Alongkorn, Princess of Phetchaburi, the daughter of King Chulalongkorn (Rama V) and Queen Savang Vadhana (later Queen Sri Savarindira, the Queen Grandmother). At the age of seven, Sangwan found herself living at the royal court. Her primary duty at that time was to attend the princess at twice-daily audiences—once in the morning upon the princess's awakening and again in the evening. Occasionally, she accompanied the princess on visits to Queen Savang Vadhana at Suan Hongsa Royal Villa on the grounds of Dusit Palace.

Shortly thereafter, Sangwan was sent to Satri Wittaya School, while living with Huan Hongsakul, the nanny of Prince Mahidol Adulyadej, Prince of Songkla, the younger brother of Princess Valaya Alongkorn. Following an accident involving a sewing needle, Sangwan was sent to Lord (Phraya) Damrong Baedyakhun, the royal court physician, for surgery. She stayed at his residence while continuing her studies at Satri Wittaya School. Noticing that she appeared listless and unhappy, he asked whether she would be interested in studying nursing, to which Sangwan immediately agreed.

At that time, Siriraj Hospital had opened a school of midwifery and nursing. Despite the minimal entry requirement of basic literacy, the program had struggled to attract students. As an additional incentive, each student received a stipend of 15 baht per month, an amount sufficient to cover living expenses.

=== Nursing student ===
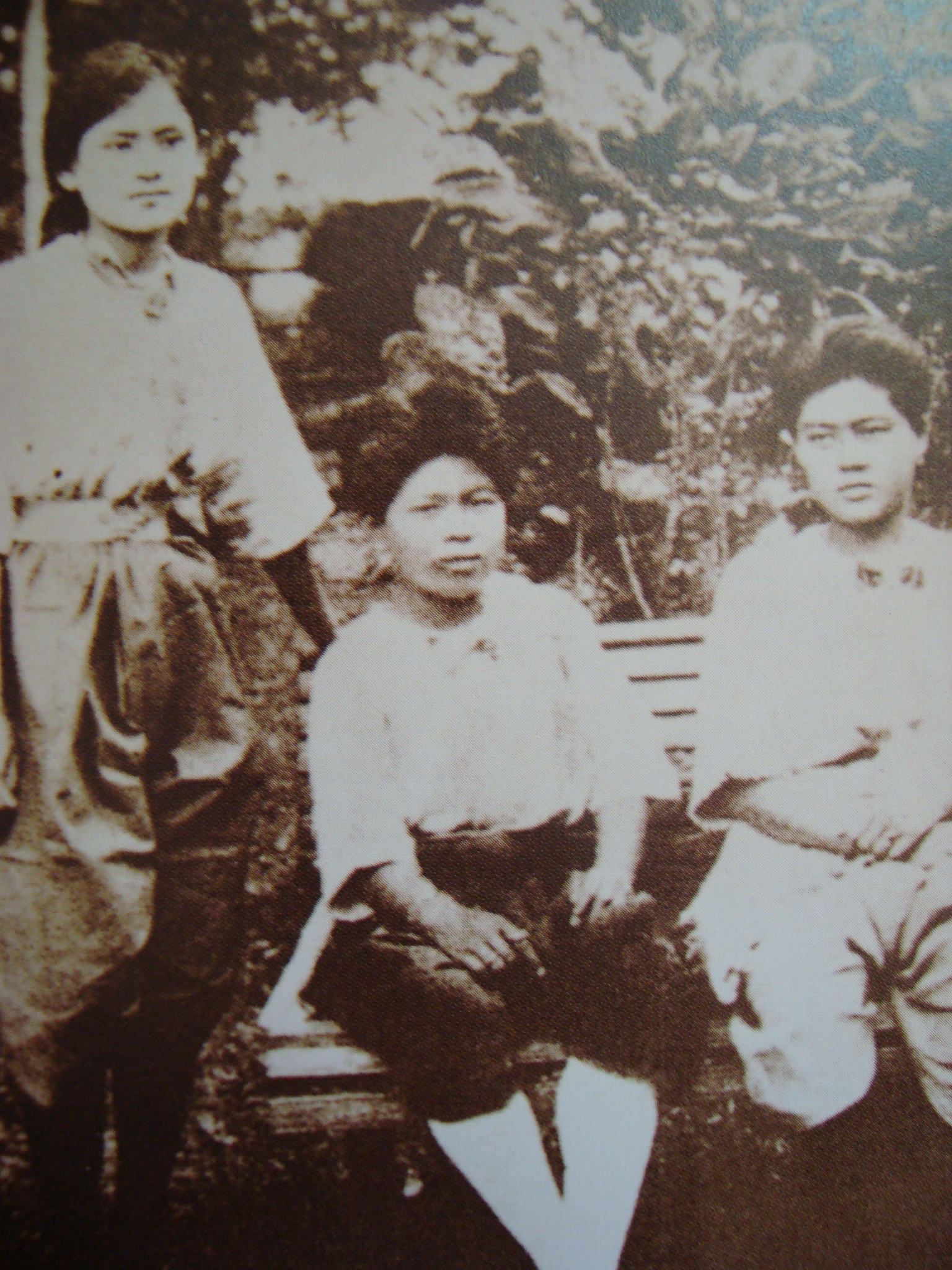
An older Sangwan (standing) with two friends at Satri Wittaya School.

Sangwan enrolled as a student of Siriraj School for Midwifery and Nursing in 1913, when she was thirteen. She was two years younger than the minimum age limit, but the school still accepted her based on her credentials. She was a scholarship recipient who agreed to work for the hospital for three years in exchange for the 15 baht per month that would cover her living costs.Upon graduation in 1916, she joined the nursing team at the hospital.

The following year, Prince Rangsit Prayursakdi, the Prince of Chainat (son of King Chulalongkorn and adopted son of Queen Savang Vadhana, half-brother of Princess Valaya Alongkorn and Prince Mahidol Adulyadej), director of the Royal Medical College of Siriraj Hospital, selected two doctors and two nurses to further their studies in the United States. These scholarship students were expected to return to teach future generations of medical students and advance the medical profession in Thailand. The medical scholarships were provided by Prince Mahidol Adulyadej, then a first-year student at Harvard Medical School, while the nursing scholarships were provided by his mother, Queen Savang Vadhana. One of the two nurses selected was Sangwan. Her preparations for this trip included a six-month intensive English course with Miss Edna Sarah Cole, headmistress of Kullasatri Wang Lang School for girls (later to become Wattana Wittaya Academy).

For her passport, Sangwan needed a surname, the use of which was not a regular practice in Thailand until 1913 during the reign of King Vajiravudh (Rama VI). As her father was dead, she took the surname of Lee Talaphat, who was in the service of Prince Mahidol Adulyadej. Her surviving younger brother registered himself as Thomya Chukramol.

Sangwan Talaphat left Bangkok on 13th August 1917 on the ship Kuala with almost 20 other Thai students. The trip took them to Singapore, Hong Kong, Japan, Hawaii, and after six weeks, the group reached San Francisco. From there, she went to live with an American family, the Adamsens of Berkeley, California, for a year, attending Emerson School with her friend Ubol Palakawongse na Ayudhya, a member of the nobility. She also attended Sunday school to learn the ways of the Christian faith.

In 1918, they joined eight other Thai students travelling to Boston, Massachusetts. On 21 September 1918, Prince Mahidol was waiting to welcome them, though Sangwan was unaware of his rank. Furthermore, she had no idea that her presence had already made an impact on the young prince, who, according to his roommate, Pradit Sukhum (later Lord (Luang) Sukhum Nayapradit), arrived home after two in the morning, shook him awake saying, "The two girls have arrived. Sangwan is really very pretty, you know."

Prince Mahidol Adulyadej had arranged for the girls to stay with the Armstrong family in Hartford, Connecticut, and to attend North Western Grammar School to perfect their English reading, writing, and speaking skills. During this time, Prince Mahidol maintained close interest in Sangwan's development, making frequent visits to Hartford. Their strolls in the park to observe the flowers reflected Sangwan's lifelong love of plants and concern for the natural environment.

=== Marriage ===
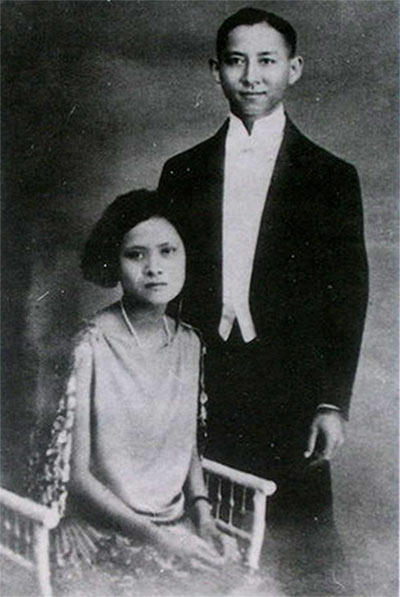
Prince Mahidol Adulyadej and Mom Sangwan in their engagement

Approval was granted to the union between Prince Mahidol Adulyadej, the Prince of Songkla Nagarindra and son of King Chulalongkorn (Rama V), and Sangwan Talabhat, and in 1919, he presented her with a diamond ring on a heart-shaped setting in a private ceremony. Thirty years later, this same ring would be presented by his son, King Bhumibol Adulyadej, to his bride-to-be, Mom Rajawongse Sirikit Kitiyakara. After their engagement, Prince Mahidol bade his fiancée move to Cambridge where she lived with the Williston sisters, Emily and Constance, who tutored her in algebra, Latin, French, and English. The prince also assigned an American woman to take Sangwan on guided tours of museums and art galleries, and explain to her the significance of the various exhibits. The royal wedding of Prince Mahidol Adulyadej and Sangwan Talapat (later Srinagarindra) was held at Sa Pathum Palace on 10 September 1920. The ceremony was presided over by Prince Mahidol Adulyadej's half-brother, King Vajiravudh.

Prince Mahidol Adulyadej and Mom Sangwan Mahidol na Ayudhya had three children, a daughter and two sons:

- Princess Galyani Vadhana, the Princess of Naradhiwas Rajanagarindra, (born 6 May 1923, died 2 January 2008), married Aram Rattanakul Serireungriddhi (then divorced) had one daughter, and then married Prince Varananda Dhavaj Chudadhuj
- King Ananda Mahidol (Rama VIII), (born 20 September 1925, died 9 June 1946), unmarried
- King Bhumibol Adulyadej (Rama IX), (born 5 December 1927, died 13 October 2016), married Mom Rajawongse Sirikit Kitiyakara, had four children.

The marriage was followed by a visit to various European countries before the couple eventually returned to the United States. Prince Mahidol resumed his studies in public health at Harvard and at the Massachusetts Institute of Technology (MIT) in Boston and arranged for his wife to take a preparatory course for nursing at Simmons College, where she studied chemistry and nutrition. Upon passing the test at the end of the semester, she went on to study school health at MIT, entering in the summer semester.

In Boston, they were simply known as "Mr and Mrs Mahidol Songkla", living in a two-bedroom flat at 63 Longwood Avenue. Apart from their studies, they were both closely involved in the activities of the Siam Association of USA under Royal Patronage, which had been established by the prince. They would often host meals for other Thai students; she did the cooking, while he washed the dishes.

=== Death of Prince Mahidol ===
Prince Mahidol Adulyadej was beset with kidney problems during his last year at medical school. Despite chronic health problems, he managed to graduate with honors. Immediately after his finals, he suffered from acute appendicitis requiring immediate surgery. As soon as he was well enough to travel, he and his family went to Europe again for an extended stopover, returning eventually to Siam in 1928 and taking up residency at Sra Pathum Palace. Prince Mahidol died on 24 September 1929 at Sapathum Palace.

At her husband's death, Mom Sangwan was just 29 years old, occupied with raising her three young children ranging in age from six and four to one year, nine months. At that time, her daughter, Princess Galyani Vadhana was studying at Rajini School. As soon as they were old enough, her sons were also sent to school, Prince Ananda Mahidol attended kindergarten at Mater Dei School and transferred to Debsirin School, while Prince Bhumibol Adulyadej remained in kindergarten at Mater Dei School.

On 24 June 1932, the 1932 Siamese Revolution brought about the end of Thailand's absolute monarchy, and the start of a constitutional monarchy. Some members of the royal family resigned their government posts, and others left the country to live overseas until the political scene had calmed.

Queen Sri Savarindira, the Queen Aunt, later titled the "Queen Grandmother", consulted with her daughter, Princess Valaya Alongkorn, the Princess of Petchaburi and her adopted son, Prince Rangsit Prayursakdi, the Prince of Chainat, about the suitable course of action for her grandchildren, especially Prince Ananda Mahidol. Prince Rangsit recommended Lausanne, Switzerland, a decision that Mom Sangwan approved due to its mild climate, scenery, and hospitable people. It was also said to be one of the most favoured places of her much-travelled husband Prince Mahidol. In April 1933, Mom Sangwan and her children left for Switzerland, together with a small entourage among whom was a young relative named Boonruen Sopoj, who later became Dame (Than Phu Ying) Boonruen Choonhavan, the widow of Prime Minister General Chatichai Choonhavan.

== As Princess Mother ==
While Mom Sangwan and her children were living in Switzerland, King Prajadhipok (Rama VII) abdicated on 2 March 1935, relinquishing his right to appoint an heir to the throne.

According to the palace Law regarding succession to the throne as promulgated by King Vajiravudh in 1924, the next in line was the son of Prince Mahidol Adulyadej, the Prince of Songkla Nagarindra. Thus Prince Ananda Mahidol, as yet only nine years old, was declared the eighth monarch of the Chakri Dynasty.

Since the new king was only nine years old, parliament unanimously appointed Prince Aditya Dibabha Abhakara (son of Prince Abhakara Kiartiwongse, the Prince of Chumphorn) and Chao Phraya Yomaraj (Pan Sukhum) as regents until the king came of age. On this occasion, Mom Sangwan was conferred the title of "Princess Mother Sri Sangwan", a title that still denoted her commoner status.

For various reasons including security in line with their new status, the family moved to a new house, names Villa Vadhana in Pully, near Lausanne.

The king and his younger brother, Prince Bhumibol Adulyadej attended a school called Ecole Nouvelle de la Suisse Romande. Although in his own country, he was king, at school in Switzerland, he was simply, Ananda Mahidol, son of Madame S. Mahidol, a student receiving no more privileges than any other student there.

=== Return to Thailand ===
Three years after ascending the throne, the young King Ananda Mahidol returned to visit his country and his people for the first time. Upon their return, Princess Sri Sangwan was elevated to the ranks of royalty with the title Her Royal Highness. Throughout the two months that the young king appeared in the midst of his people, the Thais had a chance to admire his maturity and his demeanor, which was most becoming to a monarch and far beyond his years.

The Princess Mother took advantage of this brief sojourn in their homeland to make sure that the king saw as much as he could of the important temples and historic sites in Bangkok and the environs, and of the national arts and culture. She also kindled his desire to help others, to contribute to charitable projects including public health and medicine. The king donated a sum from his privy purse to build the Ananda Mahidol Hospital in Lopburi Province, while his siblings donated toward a health centre in Samut Sakhon Province.

In January 1939, King Ananda Mahidol and his family bade farewell once again to their homeland and returned to Switzerland.

=== World War II ===
The outbreak of World War II in 1939 had repercussions on the Mahidol family. They received ration coupons like other Swiss families. They had to use ash for washing instead of soap, and the young king travelled to school by bicycle. The Princess Mother made her own jam from fruit such as strawberries, apples, and pears that she picked from her own garden.

She kept up her late husband's tradition of inviting Thai students for meals on Saturdays. The increasing number of Thai students in Switzerland, who had moved there from war-torn Belgium, France, and Italy, meant that they had to take turns as guests of the Princess Mother. Her support to the students extended to lending, or even giving, them money if their funds from Thailand arrived late.

The young king and his brother remained at Ecole Nouvélle de la Suisse Romande until 1941, boarding at the school during their last two years there, as it was their mother's wish for them to learn how to take care of themselves. Meanwhile, Princess Galyani Vadhana was attending an international school in Geneva.

The Princess Mother made a point of hiring an English governess to teach English to the king. She also made sure her children kept up with their Thai language and culture studies with a tutor, Prueng Siribhatra, who was sent by the Thai government. The family lived in Switzerland until all three children graduated.

=== Return to Thailand ===
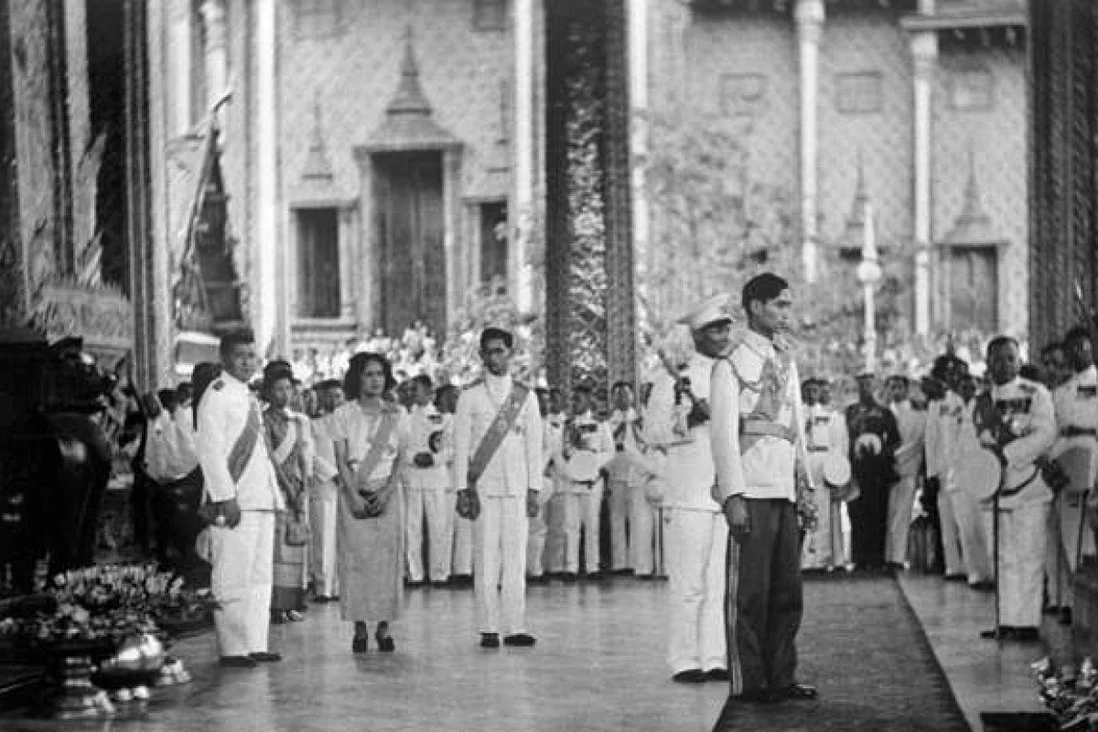
King Ananda Mahidol returned from Switzerland to Thailand, during an official ceremony in January 1946 in Bangkok, with Pridi Banomyong, Srinagarindra, and Prince Bhumibol.

On 29 November 1945, the family returned to Thailand, this time traveling by plane. Six days later, they arrived. As they stepped off the plane, the Thai public witnessed, not two young schoolboys dressed in shorts, but two mature and dignified young men.

=== Death of King Ananda Mahidol ===
The Thai government requested that the king postpone his return to Switzerland in order to present the new constitution to the nation on 9 May 1946, and to open parliament on 1 June. He acquiesced to the decision. The agreed on return trip to Switzerland was scheduled for 13 June 1946. But the trip didn't happen. On the morning of 9 June 1946, only four days before he was due to travel to Switzerland, King Ananda Mahidol (Rama VIII) was found shot dead in the Boromphiman Throne Hall, Grand Palace, Bangkok. Though the Siamese police director general originally told an emergency session of the legislature that the king's death was accidental, experts have since testified that regicide is the most likely cause of death due to the king being found flat on his back with his Colt pistol found a small distance from his body, but nearer his non-dominant hand. In February 1955, three of the late-king's attendants: his secretary Senator Chaleo Patoomros and two pages, Nai Chit and Butr Paramasrin, were executed by Phibun's regime on charges of conspiracy to kill the king after a long and confusing trial. Today, it is acknowledged that these charges seemed to be baseless, but the truth of the matter has remained a mystery.

On the same day as King Ananda Mahidol's death, by parliament's unanimous decision, Prince Bhumibol Adulyadej, was invited to accede to the throne as King Bhumibol Adulyadej (Rama IX) of Thailand, the ninth monarch of the Chakri Dynasty

=== Return to Switzerland ===
On 19 August 1946, the princess mother accompanied the new king back to Switzerland, where he resumed his studies at the University of Lausanne. He switched his choice of subjects from science to political science, law and economics, in order to better suit his new priorities.

On 4 October 1948, King Bhumibol Adulyadej was badly hurt in a motoring accident, requiring hospitalization.

Not long afterwards, on 12 August 1949, the Thai people learned that the king had become engaged to Mom Rajawongse Sirikit Kitiyakara, the eldest daughter of "His Serene Highness Prince" (Mom Chao) Nakkhatra Mangkala Kitiyakara (later to become His Highness the Prince of Chuntaburi II Suranath), the Thai ambassador of the Court of St. James's, England, and Mom Luang Bua Sanidvongse.

== Serving the kingdom ==
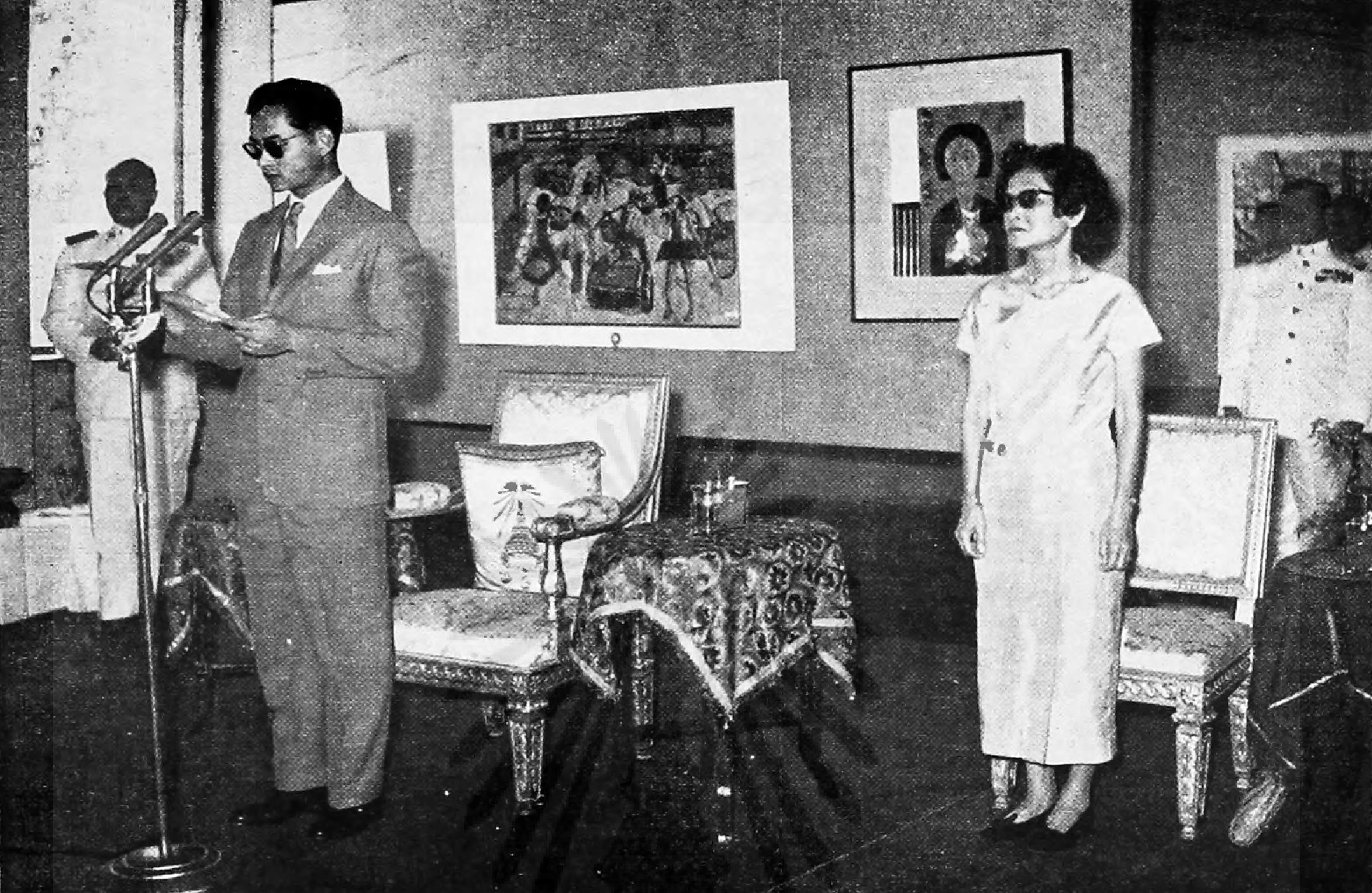
King Bhumibol Adulyadej, accompanied by his mother Princess Si Sangwan, declared open the 13th National Art Exhibition of Thailand at the Fine Arts Department of Thailand on 20 February 1962.

When the King Bhumibol Adulyadej returned to Thailand from his studies in Switzerland in 1951 with his wife, Queen Sirikit, and their first daughter, Princess Ubolratana Rajakanya, the princess mother remained in Lausanne. She returned only periodically between 1952 and 1963 in order to attend significant functions or events, such as the birth of her grandchildren, the illness and subsequent death of Queen Sri Savarindira, the Queen Grandmother, or the ordination of her son. For these visits, she would stay only one or two months at a time, and only stayed for extended periods when the occasion demanded. On the king's state visit to 14 European countries and the United States in 1960, she remained in Thailand for six months, acting as Regent of Thailand during the king's absence, just as she did during subsequent state visits overseas until 1967.

As regent, the Princess Mother carried out various official duties on behalf of the king, including accepting diplomatic credentials from newly posted ambassadors, conferring degrees on university graduates, presiding at religious ceremonies and putting her signature to several important legislative acts. She was the third female regent of the Rattanakosin era, the first being Queen Saovabha Phongsri during the reign of King Chulalongkorn (later became Queen Sri Bajrindra, the Queen Mother), and Queen Sirikit early on in the present reign. In this capacity, she put her signature to a number of important laws and declarations, including the Suppression of Prostitution Act of 1960, and the first National Economic Development Plan, 1961–1966.

A trip to Northern Thailand in 1964 helped change her routine. Not long after the Bhubing Palace in Chiang Mai Province was completed, the king invited the Princess Mother for a visit. As was her habit in Switzerland, the Princess Mother went for long treks through the woods behind the palace, enjoying the flora and fauna, and stopping in villages en route. It was then that she discovered the poverty of the villages in remote areas. There was a lack of schools and health services. Even the border patrol police, who acted as guides and also provided security for her on the trips, were very poorly paid, and received no per diem supplement for services rendered over and above normal duties. Her observations of the precarious economic situation of the rural areas, prompted the princess mother to make regular visits to the remotest areas of the kingdom, starting in 1964.

=== Social welfare projects ===
In 1932, when her children had started school and she had more time on her hands, she set up an American-style "sewing circle", inviting close acquaintances to join the group. Among the members of the circle were Mom Chao Sipphanphansanur Sohnakul, Than Phu Ying Prayong Sanidvongs na Ayudhya, Khunying Chalaem Puranasiri, Khunying Srivisarnvaja, Khunying Prem, Damrongbaedyakhun, Than Phu Ying Poa Anurakshraja mondira, and expatriate wives such as Mrs. Zimmerman, Mrs. Davis, Mrs. Langesen, Mrs. Nederguard, Mrs. Pendleton and Mrs. Reeve, whose husbands were missionaries or lecturers at Chulalongkorn University.

The sewing circle members started by making their own clothes, then making clothes for poor children at various hospitals. They met once a week, each member taking turns hosting tea at home between 16:00-18:00.

It soon became a procedure for the Princess Mother to use her own money to purchase items for poor villages during her increasingly frequent upcountry visits. These gifts included T-shirts, towels, multipurpose "pha khao ma" cloth, and stationery for teachers; school uniforms and stationery for schoolchildren; and pha khao ma, sarongs, needles and thread, medicine, tinned food, and dried foodstuffs for villagers. Children received toys suitable for their ages.

She also set up with her own personal funds a number of foundations, most notably the Border Patrol Police Support Foundation and the New Life Foundation for those recovering from leprosy or mental illness.

Apart from her own funds, the money for these various projects came from the sale of handicrafts made through projects initiated by the princess mother, such as pressed-flower greeting cards and brooms and brushes made from sisal hemp.

In 1985, the cabinet approved the proposal of the National Committee for the Promotion and Development of Social Welfare Activities that 21 October, the Princess Mother's birthday, be declared National Social Welfare Day. As she was also a nurse, it has since been renamed National Nurses' Day (Thai: วันพยาบาลแห่งชาติ Wan Phayaban Haeng Chat).

=== Education ===
For the Princess Mother, education was of paramount was an importance. Being a scholarship student herself, she was known to provided scholarships to students as far back as 1920, not long after her marriage to Prince Mahidol Adulyadej. The Bangkok Times of 21 September 1920, listed the names of donors to the Kullasatri Wang Lang School, which included the newlyweds, who had donated 5,000 baht. The publication noted that Mom Sangwan Mahidol na Ayudhya, having married into the royal family, was entitled to an annual stipend of 200 baht, and that she donated it entirely to needy students.

Through the influence of her husband, she had always considered it her responsibility to return to Thailand to help the nation. This sense of responsibility was instilled in her three children. According to Princess Galyani Vadhana, "It was almost an unspoken rule, a nature [sic] sense of priority to do what we could for the country. What mother taught us came from Father. He was 8 years older than Mother, and taught her a lot. Mother was very receptive, she learned so much from Father. What she taught us I later found to be almost quoted verbatim from Father...It was like Father teaching us through Mother..."

One of the princess mother's educational initiatives was the Border Patrol Police School project. A school had been set up by the Border Patrol Police Region 5 in their Dararasmi Camp, in Mae Rim District, Chiang Mai Province. The school provided access to education for children from remote regions, giving hill tribe children a chance to learn the Thai language and culture and instilling in them a sense of being Thai. The concept was in line with the princess mother's own philosophy that education was the key to improving human resources. She therefore took the school under her royal patronage in 1964, and donated funds to the Border Patrol Police to set up similar schools in remote areas. The private sector found this to be a worthy cause, and contributed its share in setting up more schools, which were named after their donors. Each school—there were eventually 185—had proper classrooms and accommodations for teachers. She went to open each of these schools, donating to them a set of symbolic items to bolster a sense of Thai identity, including a Buddha image to symbolize religion, a portrait of the king or queen as an emblem of the monarchy, and a flag to represent the nation. She also made sure that each school was equipped with a radio set to keep up with the news, and a map of Thailand to give students a sense of belonging no matter where in the country they were located.

=== Public health ===
To the Princess Mother, the health and well-being of her people were high on the list of priorities. The philosophy echoed that of her husband, Prince Mahidol Adulyadej, who had pledged his mental, physical, and financial support to the field of public health of the country.

Upon the death of Prince Mahidol, the Princess Mother continued to provide scholarships to medical students so their studies would not be interrupted. When they returned to work, she also supplemented their salary if it happened to be lower than the set rate. A revolving fund of 500,000 baht was provided to Chulalongkorn University for 25 years, from which the interest could be used to send students for post-graduate studies overseas. After 25 years, the fund was transferred to the Faculty of Medicine, Siriraj Hospital.

In 1945, as she accompanied her elder son, King Ananda Mahidol, back to Thailand, she brought back with her the drug PAS which was used to treat tuberculosis.

In addition to providing scholarships, the princess mother continued to play a major role in the field of nursing in Thailand. She founded the Thailand Nursing Association, of which she was also a board member. With her funds, the first national nursing convention in Thailand was organized in 1960. Hospital buildings and nursing schools were built with her patronage.

=== Princess Mother's volunteer doctors ===
Since 1964, when trips to remote areas to visit villagers and army personnel became a routine procedure, she noticed how people living there were plagued by health problems. Due to the lack of medical facilities, such basic illnesses as gastrointestinal infections, tapeworms, skin diseases, and malaria would often lead to death.

In 1969, she established the first medical volunteer mobile unit in Chiang Mai Province, called "The Princess Mother's Medical Volunteers". The team was made up of doctors, dentists, pharmacists, nurses, and health officers, who volunteered their time on weekends to treat the ill, and offer consultative services to the public free of charge.

All expenses for these visits were subsidized by the Princess Mother. If she happened to be on the trip with the medical team, she would help fill the prescriptions and provide advice to the sick. Those in critical condition would be sent to local hospitals. Later, she experimented with the system of radio consultation between doctors in the hospital and patients at health centers in remote areas, following the system used by the Royal Flying Doctor Service of Australia. The project was well received, and within a few years the number of radio centers increased to 446 covering 25 provinces, with the center of operations at Srapathum Palace. Over a million patients benefited from this service.

In 1974, the Princess Mother donated one million baht to establish "The Princess Mother's Volunteer Flying Doctor Foundation", which was subsequently changed into "The Princess Mother's Volunteer Foundation" (PMMV) in 1985.

The Prostheses Foundation and the Breast Foundation, both under the patronage of the Princess Mother, were two projects initiated in her later years. The Prostheses Foundation was set up in 1992, when she learned that a doctor from Chiang Mai University had developed below knee prostheses from recycled plastic bottles which cost only 700 baht, and artificial limbs that could be used for agricultural purposes for 300 baht. She saw this as an opportunity to provide artificial limbs free of charge to the poor. With initial funding donated by the princess mother, and further donations from her daughter, Princess Galyani Vadhana, and the general public, the foundation offers artificial limbs to the needy.

=== Environmental conservation ===
In 1964, at the age of 64, she hiked to the top of Doi Inthanon, Thailand's highest peak, in Chiang Mai Province. She had been used to hiking from Bhubing Palace, accompanied by border control police and two physicians. Soon she felt that she had covered all she could within the immediate vicinity, and yearned to conquer Doi Inthanon, which was visible from the palace windows. In those days there was no access road to the top, so the princess mother spent two nights camping out during her hike, the first night at Pang Somdet, and the following night at Ban Pha Mon. A large number of hill tribe villagers turned up to welcome her. The tribes people's lack of access to medical care concerned her. When she returned the following year, she brought with her two physicians, and her visits to these remote areas by helicopter eventually earned her the name Mae Fah Luang among the hill tribes, meaning 'royal mother from the sky', referring to her arrival by helicopter with physicians, nurses, medicines, food, and clothing.

With her visits to the hill tribes, she realized that their slash-and-burn system of cultivation had inadvertently caused the destruction of the watershed forests. Over the years, they had moved from place to place, leaving behind them patches of barren hillside.

In response, she created the Doi Tung Development Project. "I shall plant forests on Doi Tung", she pledged. In 1988, a total of 93,515 rai (14,962 ha) in Mae Chan District, Mae Sai District, and Mae Fa Luang District of Chiang Rai Province were targeted for reforestation and sustainable development to improve the quality of life of the local villagers.

The Princess Mother played an active role in the Doi Tung Development Project, beginning with nursing tree saplings herself and replanting forests. Surrounding the palace are experimental plots where temperate crops are tested, such as Arabica coffee beans from Brazil and Costa Rica, macadamia, and chestnuts. Mulberry trees, the fibre of which is used to make sa paper, is another of the money-making crops they plant, nurture, and process. New plant cultivation technologies are continually tested for the cultivation of asparagus, bananas, orchids, and strawberries. After successful trials, villagers are trained in the techniques to follow, the improvements designed to provide them with increased income.

A Drug Rehabilitation Centre was also set up so addicts could be treated and provided with vocational training to suit their way of life.

== Personal life ==
Though her children grew up as members of the royal family in the days of absolute monarchy, Princess Mother did not bring them up in a life of privilege, surrounded by attentive staff eager to follow orders. This was not the way of Prince Mahidol or his wife.

Princess Galyani Vadhana described her upbringing as being very much in the vein of any normal family, where the children are taught to be respectful of adults, to be responsible in their duties, and to expect punishment when they are naughty. Corporal punishment was applicable as the last resort. First-time mistakes would be discussed, and explanations given; however, if the children still persisted despite reasons and warnings, then punishments would be meted out. Often the Princess Mother would even discuss with the offender what level of punishment they thought deserved. Then they would face the consequences.

Princess Galyani Vadhana recounted a particular episode in Lausanne when Prince Ananda Mahidol, despite frequent warnings, persisted in picking on a youngster who was the son of the caretaker. On this particular occasion, Prince Ananda Mahidol pushed the boy near some stairs, which could have led to a disastrous outcome. The exasperated mother said to her son, "I've warned you many times, this time I'm going to spank you. How many times do you think you should be spanked?" Whereupon the young boy answered, "Once". "I don't think that's enough," continued Mother, "since you've done it several times now. I think it should be three times." And with that, the punishment was carried out. Prince Ananda never picked on the boy again.

The children had been taught from a young age to be thrifty. They each received weekly pocket money, the amount depending on their age, but never more than was necessary to buy themselves a bag of sweets or some chocolates. Other items, such as books and toys, also had to come out of their own pocket money. The Princess Mother only indulged them on special occasions, such as birthdays.

A sense of frugality was something that the Princess Mother practiced throughout her life. Even when she was in a position to pamper herself, she preferred to maintain her simple way of life. Her meals were simple dishes that emphasized nutritional value. She only had new clothes made when necessary, usually two outfits a year. She wore very little jewellery. A simple bracelet made of nine gemstones was the extent of her accessories; she said it went with any outfit. She also wore one particular ring — a diamond ring with her Thai initials "Sor Vor" (Thai: ส.ว.) etched on top. The initials stood for "Savang Vadhana" (Thai: สว่างวัฒนา), the given name of Queen Sri Savarindira, who had given her the ring.

Manners were an integral part of character building. The children were taught to respect elders and behave properly with other people, and this remained the same despite the change in their status later in life. Along with manners came spirituality and religion. Though she learned about Christianity during her years in the U.S., she remained a devout Buddhist, and brought up her children in the Buddhist faith. She was clever enough to introduce Western religious practises such as bedtime prayers into their daily routines to make Buddhism more accessible to them. Instead of the usual Sanskrit incantations, they said their prayers in Thai, asking the Lord Buddha to protect them and lead them down the good and righteous path. Prayers would then be supplemented by stories of the life of the Buddha.

To encourage them to be aware of their responsibilities, the children were expected to do their chores like any other children. They had to keep their rooms clean and tidy, and even the young king had to make his own bed when he was in Lausanne. This habit remained in later years. When King Bhumibol Adulyadej was living overseas, he would drive, wash, and even polish his own car without assistance. Similarly, after his music sessions, he would insist on putting away his own musical instruments and wiping them himself.

Her way of bringing up the children earned great respect from Queen Sri Savarindira, who had nothing but praise for her daughter-in-law. As Princess Galyani Vadhana noted, "Queen Sri Savarindira did not get involved in the everyday routine of bringing up the children, but only gave advice on important matters. That was because she respected Mother, seeing that she brought up her children with proper discipline and in the right way. Queen Sri Savarindira did not feel the need to interfere because Mother was doing such a good job already."

=== Interest in astronomy ===
According to Princess Galyani Vadhana's book, Busy Fingers, the Princess Mother had always shown an interest in astronomy. "When she was in the States she had a copy of Astronomy for Beginners. Later on when her youngest son started astronomy lessons at his Lausanne school, Mother bought him a copy of Le Ciel (The Sky), Larousse edition. In this book there were some maps of stars and the Moon which she looked up so often that three pages fell out. These Mother took out eventually for separate use".

On boat trips, the Princess Mother was known to have enjoyed standing on deck at night, gazing at the stars without the use of a telescope. When naval officers explained the names of the constellations to her in Thai and English, she would give their French and Latin names, then proceed to astonish the officials with her knowledge of the constellations.

Her interest in astronomy remained a lifelong passion and was reflected in several of her other activities. The constellations appeared as part of her ceramics painting, on lamps, ashtrays, and dishes, often in the form of flowers representing the stars, with the number of petals and the colours representing the magnitude of each star.

Her love of astronomy was evident in her Doi Tung Royal Villa. The ceiling of the main reception hall is decorated with the constellations as designed by the Bangkok Planetarium. "I want a ceiling for the hall that is inexpensive," she instructed, opting for a carving of the Solar System and the twelve signs of the zodiac, and twelve constellations rather than a crystal chandelier. Each star was represented by a lightbulb giving off a comparative magnitude of light. Wood carvings of other constellations also adorned her private balcony and some of doors.

=== Horticulture ===
The Princess Mother had a passion for flowers. It was a defining characteristic that dominated her life from her youth through to her later years. This love of flowers reflected a sensitivity and a concern for nature that was not just enjoyment of its aesthetic qualities, but included the need to care and nurture them into full bloom with the same kind of attention and concern that she gave to her role as mother, and every other project in her lifetime.

Plants are like people. This particular zinnia I didn't grow from a seed, but bought a sapling from a nursery, and it is now strong and healthy. Why is that? Because the nursery owner knew how to choose a good seed, and the right soil. He knew how to nurse the sapling, which I couldn't have done as he did. When I bought it back, I had to attend to it, fertilize it constantly because the soil here is not so fertile. I have to constantly water the plant, turn the soil, pull the weeds and pick the dead leaves. People are like that; if he comes from a good breed, the child will be healthy and intelligent. If the parents provide constant nurturing, picking out the defective bits and adding fertilizer, the child will grow up and prosper like these zinnias.

=== Photography ===
Another hobby since she was a nursing student at Siriraj Hospital was photography. When she arrived in California and started receiving her own pocket money of US$5 a month, she saved to buy her own box camera. She experimented with different photographic techniques, such as double exposure, and would continuously upgrade her equipment. Her children were subjects for her camera, and as a result, the country has extensive records of their two kings as children. In 1928, her interest was drawn to the movie camera. She was among the 50 members of the Amateur Cinematographic Society set up by King Prajadhipok at Chitralada Palace. The hobby was adopted by both her sons.

=== Sports ===
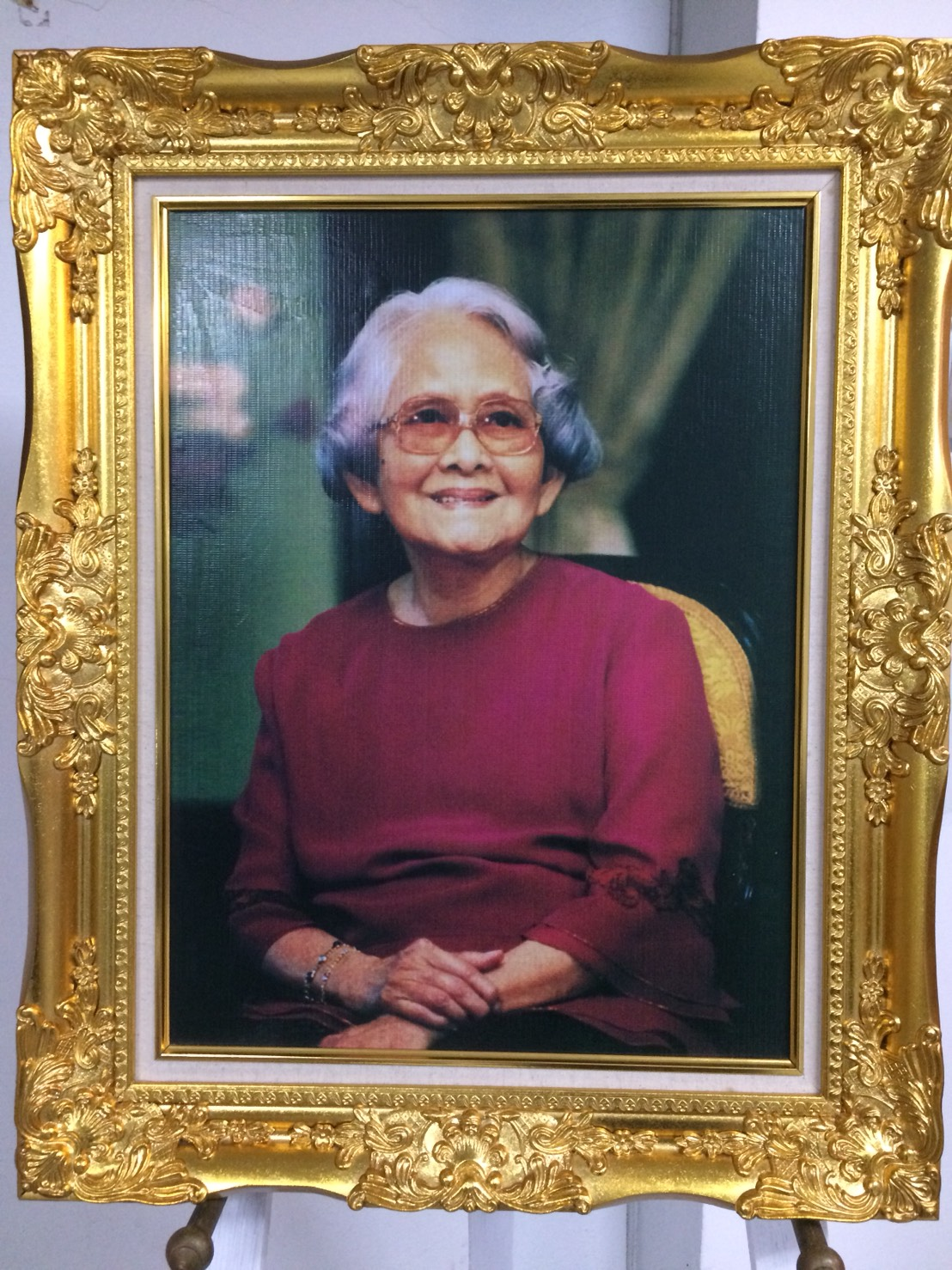
Portraits of Srinagarindra

The Princess Mother was fond of outdoor activities, and was an avid skier. Skiing was a sport she enjoyed with her children when they were in Switzerland. Badminton and horseback riding were also regular activities, and she continued riding well into her seventies. She only gave up badminton when she was 70, and skiing when she was 80. In later years, she would enjoy a game of pétanque.

Through her knowledge of health care and nutrition, and regular exercise, the Princess Mother retained good health. A physical examination in 1988 showed that she was in perfect condition. "If you were to look at the medical report, her blood tests, blood pressure, pulse, etc., without knowing who the patient was, I guarantee that no one would have guessed her age correctly, as the results were no different from those of any strong and healthy young man or woman", said Dr. Chek Dhanasiri, one of her physicians.

=== Sustainability ===
When the Princess Mother started making regular visits to villagers, officials, soldiers and police in the Thai border areas in 1966, the scene from her helicopter showed barren hillsides devoid of trees, with occasional shifting crops, weeds, and opium poppies. From these visits, she learned of the precarious existence of the villagers who had to grow crops through slash-and-burn cultivation methods that destroyed the natural environment and the watershed.

"I shall plant forests on Doi Tung." With those words, a royal initiative was created, launching a project to return the mountain to its original state. The Princess Mother was also determined to improve the quality of life of the villagers, provide education and health services, means of a regular income, and an awareness of the need to preserve the environment.

Acting on this inspiration, the government under Prime Minister General Prem Tinsulanonda set up the Doi Tung Development Project in 1988 as a joint project between seven ministries. The princess mother was approaching her 90th birthday, and the Thai people were concerned that her annual sojourns in Switzerland were becoming too taxing for age. A house on Doi Tung would be the perfect solution. At 1,000 meters elevation, with temperatures ranging between 17 and 24 degrees Celsius, its climate and the surrounding scenery were not unlike the cool, mountain setting of Villa Vadhana in Lausanne.

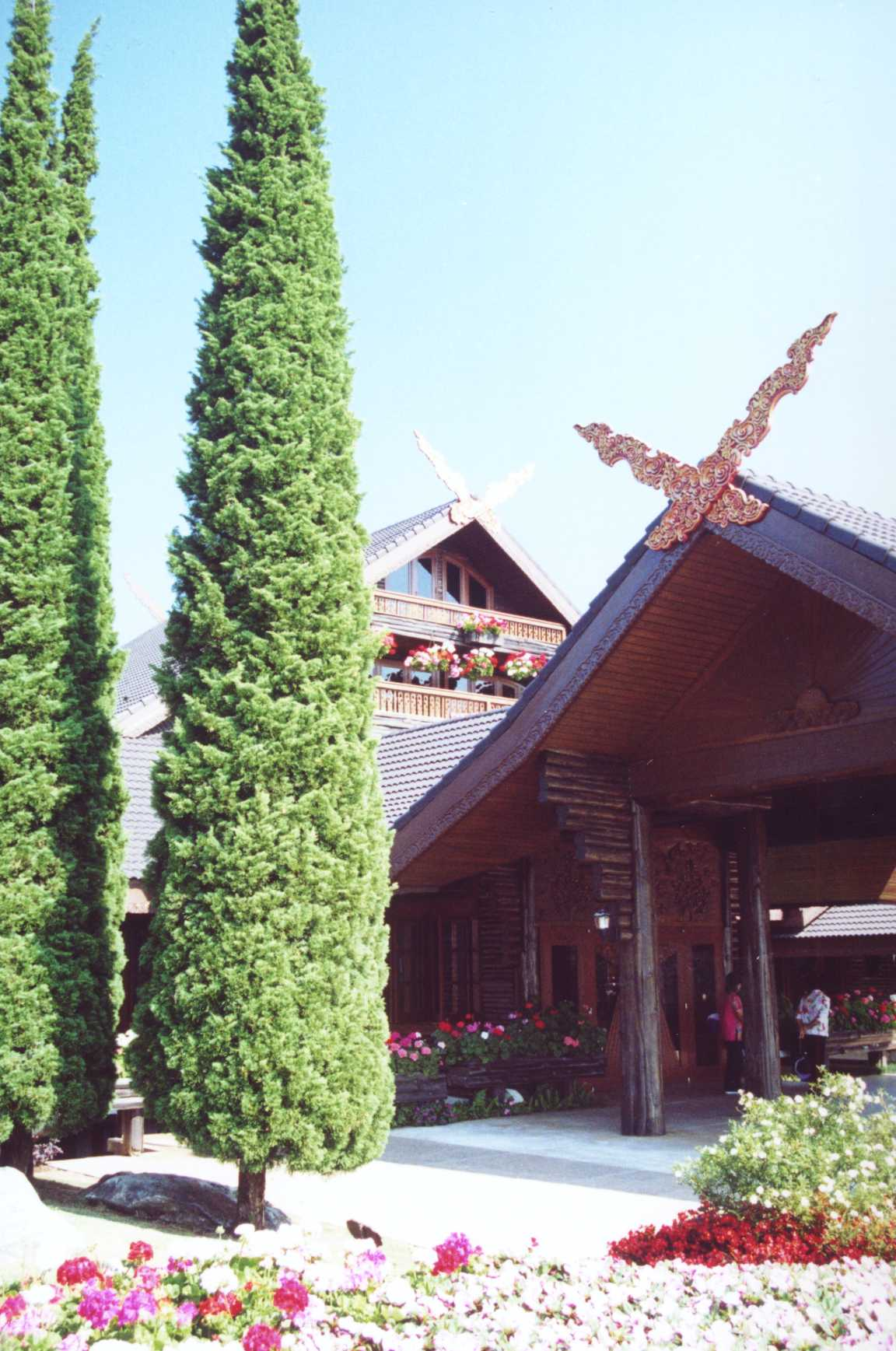
Doi Tung Royal Villa

The two-story house is nestled against a steep incline. The upper floor is divided into four sections: the private quarters of the Princess Mother, the private quarters of her daughter Princess Galyani Vadhana, the quarters of Princess Galyani Vadhana's only daughter, Than Phu Ying Dhasanawalaya Sornsongkram, and the reception hall and kitchen.

Reflecting the Princess Mother's deep interest in astronomy, the ceiling in the reception hall is carved in the image of the solar system, with clusters of the different star signs. It has a handcrafted wood inlay of the Princess Mother's favourite constellations. Designed by the Astronomy Society of Thailand, light bulbs installed in the ceiling representing stars showed the position of the constellations on 21 October 1900, the day the Princess Mother was born. Walls are lined with Thai silk embroidered with flowers. Other decorative items are carvings of elephant herds in the forest, while the Thai alphabet lines the stairway to the lower level.

Behind the palace is a long balcony lined with flower boxes. It is here that the Princess Mother spent many hours tending to the flowers. The lower levels are living and working quarters. In front is a wide lawn with flower gardens, which affords a view of mountain ranges.

The Princess Mother took up residence at the Doi Tung Royal Villa on 23 November 1988, 10 months after the start of construction, and before it was completed. She stayed at the Royal Villa on five more occasions for several months at a time to allow her to work on her projects.

== Mae Fah Luang Foundation ==
Parallel to the princess mother's project on the greening of Doi Tung was a plan to improve the quality of life of the local hill tribe villagers. No longer able to rely on their slash-and-burn method of cultivation, they needed alternative ways to feed themselves and earn income. In 1972, the princess mother established the Hill Tribes Products Promotion Foundation with an initial donation of 100,000 baht. The foundation, based at Sa Pathum Palace in Bangkok, would promote and market the handicrafts produced by each village. The foundation also provided training to hill tribe youth.

The princess mother donated money to buy 2.3 hectares of land in Chiang Rai, which became the centre for training in agriculture, weaving, and dyeing. A Hill Tribe Youth Leadership Programme was set up to allow 50 youths to undergo training each year.

== Death and funeral ==
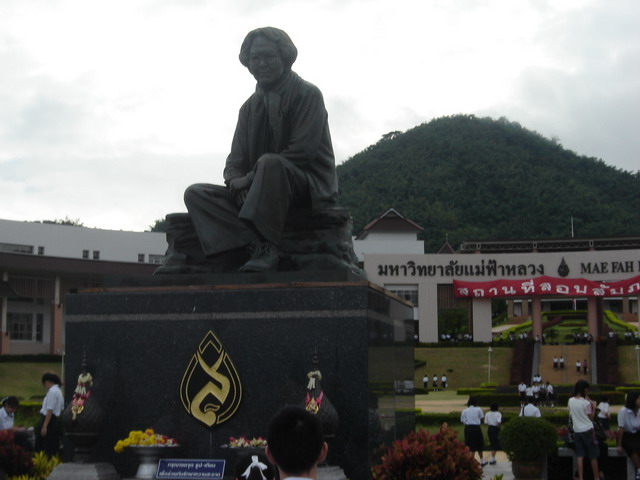
Princess Srinagarindra statue at Mae Fah Luang University

The Princess Mother's official residence was Sa Pathum Palace, where she lived with her daughter, Princess Galyani Vadhana. In mid-1991, she fell in her bedroom, never entirely recovering from that accident. In November 1993, December 1994, and again in June 1995 she was admitted to the Siriraj Hospital for treatment. Princess Srinagarindra died at 21:17 ICT on 18 July 1995 at Siriraj Hospital at the age of 94. She was one of the longest-living Thai royals.

As her body lay in state within the ancient and cavernous Dusit Maha Prasat Throne Hall, in the compound of the Grand Palace, mourners thronged to pay their last respects. These included not only members of the royal family, diplomats, government officials, and those living within the confines of the capital city, but also hill tribe villagers from the far corners of the kingdom.

The royal cremation took place on 10 March 1996, for which an elaborately carved royal crematorium, or Phra Merumas, was built in the centre of Sanam Luang, symbolizing the mythical mountain abode of the Hindu gods. Crowds lined the street as the golden urn of rank was transported on the Royal Great Victory Carriage, or Phra Maha Pichai Ratcharot, in a solemn procession from the Grand Palace to the crematorium. Her royal cremation ceremony was one of the biggest events Thailand has witnessed in modern times, attended by thousands of people and watched on television nationwide.

The funeral pyre was lit by her son, King Bhumibol Adulyadej. After the cremation, the king collected his mother's ashes to be interred near her husband Prince Mahidol Adulyadej in the Rangsi Vadhana Memorial, Royal Cemetery, Wat Ratchabophit.

Her cremation was followed by traditional Thai theatrical performance and dances, the first such celebration in years. She had noticed how sad the atmosphere at the 1985 royal cremation of Queen Rambai Barni had been, when all the traditional cultural events at royal family cremations were banned under King Vajiravudh (Rama VI) due to fiscal constraints. Her wishes were observed by the royal family and the Bureau of the Royal Household, which organized her state funeral.

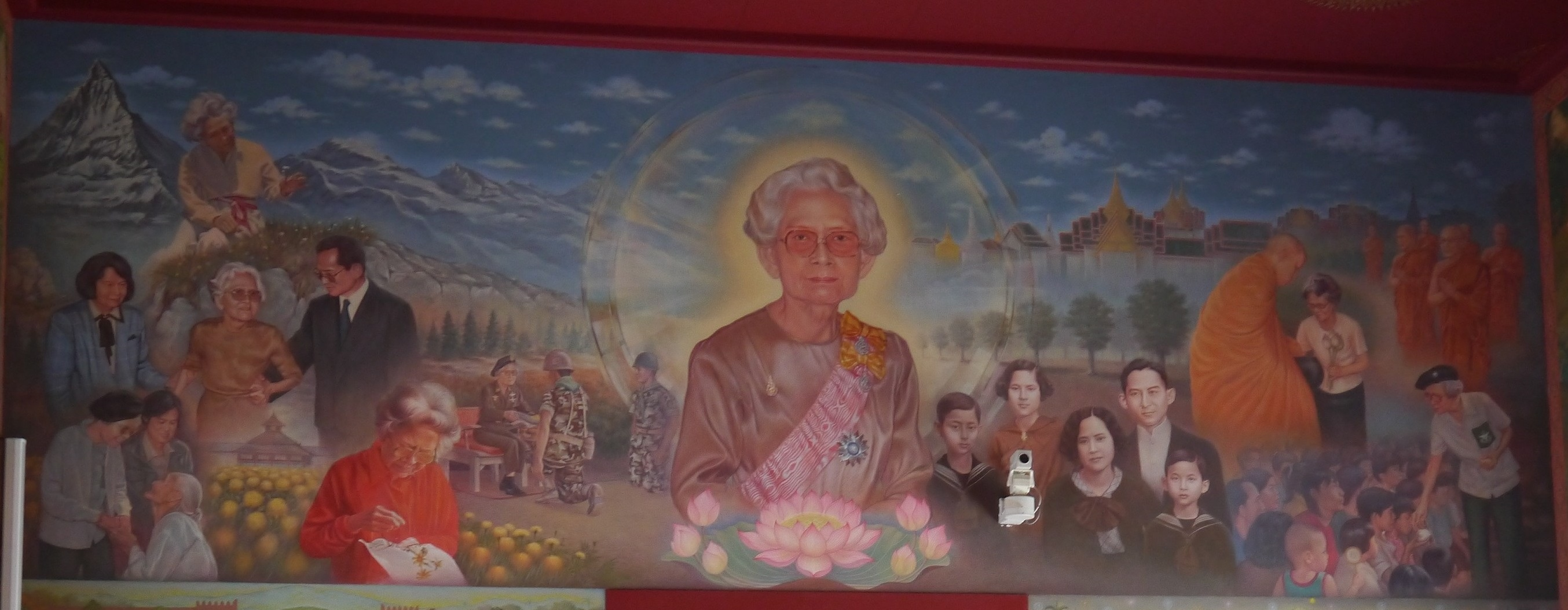
Murals in Wat Srinagarindravararam depicting the Princess Mother and her family

== Honours ==
Styles of: Princess Srinagarindra; Princess Mother of Thailand
- Reference style: Her Royal Highness
- Spoken style: Your Royal Highness

Royal cypher of Princess Srinagarindra, the Princess Mother. The letters "ส.ว." (sor vor) refers to her given name, Sangwan

=== National ===
- Dame of the Most Illustrious Order of the Royal House of Chakri
- Dame of the Ancient and Auspicious Order of the Nine Gems
- Dame Grand Cross of the Order of Chula Chom Klao
- Dame Grand Cordon of the Order of the White Elephant
- Dame Grand Cordon of the Order of the Crown of Thailand
- Dame Grand Cross of the Order of the Direkgunabhorn
- Member of the Order of Symbolic Propitiousness Ramkeerati
- Freemen Safeguarding Medal, First Class
- King Rama VII Royal Cypher Medal, First Class
- King Rama VIII Royal Cypher Medal, First Class
- King Rama IX Royal Cypher Medal, First Class
- Red Cross Medal of Appreciation, First Class

=== Foreign ===
- Japan: Grand Cordon (First Class) of the Order of the Precious Crown
- Denmark: Knight of the Order of the Elephant
- Netherlands: Dame Grand Cross of the Order of Orange-Nassau

=== Military rank ===
- General, Admiral, Air Chief Marshal

=== Police rank ===
- Police General

=== Volunteer Defense Corps of Thailand rank ===
- Volunteer Defense Corps General

== Issue ==
Name	Birth	Death	Marriage		Their children
Name	Birth	Death	Date	Spouse	Their children
Galyani Vadhana, Princess of Naradhiwas	6 May 1923	2 January 2008 (aged 84)	11 July 1944; Divorced 1950	Aram Rattanakul Serireongrit	Dhasanawalaya Ratanakul; Serireongrit
Galyani Vadhana, Princess of Naradhiwas	6 May 1923	2 January 2008 (aged 84)	24 September 1969	Varananda Dhavaj	None
Ananda Mahidol (Rama VIII)	20 September 1925	9 June 1946 (aged 20)	None		None
Bhumibol Adulyadej (Rama IX)	5 December 1927	13 October 2016 (aged 88)	28 April 1950	Sirikit Kitiyakara	Princess Ubolratana
Bhumibol Adulyadej (Rama IX)	5 December 1927	13 October 2016 (aged 88)	28 April 1950	Sirikit Kitiyakara	Vajiralongkorn (Rama X)
Bhumibol Adulyadej (Rama IX)	5 December 1927	13 October 2016 (aged 88)	28 April 1950	Sirikit Kitiyakara	Sirindhorn, Princess Debaratana Rajasuda
Bhumibol Adulyadej (Rama IX)	5 December 1927	13 October 2016 (aged 88)	28 April 1950	Sirikit Kitiyakara	Chulabhorn, Princess Srisavangavadhana

== See also ==
- Princess Mother Memorial Park, a park in remembrance of Srinagarindra.
- Srinagarindra Road, a road in Thailand named in her honour
- Wat Srinagarindravararam, a temple in Switzerland named in her honour

== Notes ==
Order of precedence
Preceded by Princess Vapi Busbakara	Eldest Royal Member of the Chakri Dynasty; 1982–1995	Succeeded by Princess of Naradhiwas
Non-profit organization positions
First	President of Princess Mother's Medical Volunteer; 1969–1995	Succeeded by Galyani Vadhana
