= Aram Rattanakul Serireongrit =

Thai colonel (1920-1982)

Colonel Aram Rattanakul Serireongrit
- อร่าม รัตนกุล เสรีเริงฤทธิ์
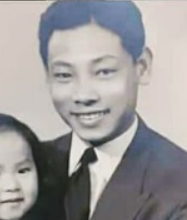
- Born: August 24, 1920
- Died: February 3, 1982 (aged 61)
- Spouse: Galyani Vadhana (m. 1944; div. 1950)
- Children: Dhasanawalaya Sornsongkram
- Parent(s): Charun Rattanakun Seriroengrit; Earb Rattanakul Serireongrit

Colonel Aram Rattanakul Serireongrit (24 August 1920 – 3 February 1982) was the former husband of Galyani Vadhana, Princess of Naradhiwas, and the son of General Charun Rattanakul Serireongrit, a military officer and former commander of the Phayap Army during World War II, who also served as Deputy Minister of Defence, Minister of Economic Affairs, Minister of Commerce under the government of Field Marshal Plaek Phibunsongkhram, as well as Director-General and Governor of the State Railway of Thailand.

== Biography ==
Colonel Aram Rattanakul Serireongrit was born on 24 August 1920. He was the son of General Charun Rattanakul Serireongrit and Khun Ying Earb (née Komolwardhana). He had a brother, Police Major General Udom Rattanakul Serireongrit (later renamed Phuwalaph).

Colonel Aram married Galyani Vadhana, Princess of Naradhiwas, the elder sister of King Bhumibol Adulyadej (Rama IX), in 1944. They had a daughter, Than Phu Ying Dhasanawalaya Sornsongkram (born 11 November 1945 in Switzerland).

Colonel Aram was the sole passenger accompanying King Bhumibol Adulyadej in the royal motorcar when it collided with a truck near Lake Geneva in Switzerland on 4 October 1948, sustaining severe injuries.

In 1953, a royal command appointed Captain Aram Rattanakul Serireongrit as a special aide-de-camp, serving in royal service starting from 15 January 1953.

Upon returning to Thailand, Colonel Aram worked as an educator. In 1957, he served as the principal of the Construction Vocational School (currently the Faculty of Architecture, King Mongkut's Institute of Technology Ladkrabang) until his retirement in 1980.

Colonel Aram Rattanakul Serireongrit passed away on 3 February 1982. On 16 March 1982, King Bhumibol Adulyadej, Queen Sirikit, and Princess Maha Chakri Sirindhorn attended his royal cremation ceremony at the Royal Crematorium, Wat Thepsirintrawat.

== Honours ==
- Order of the White Elephant - 2nd Class (1970)
- Order of the Crown of Thailand (1966)
- Order of the Chula Chom Klao (1953)
- King Rama IX Royal Cypher Medal (1953)
