= Charun Rattanakun Seriroengrit =

Thai general and politician (1895–1983)

Charun Rattanakun Seriroengrit MWM PCh ThChW
- จรูญ รัตนกุล เสรีเริงฤทธิ์
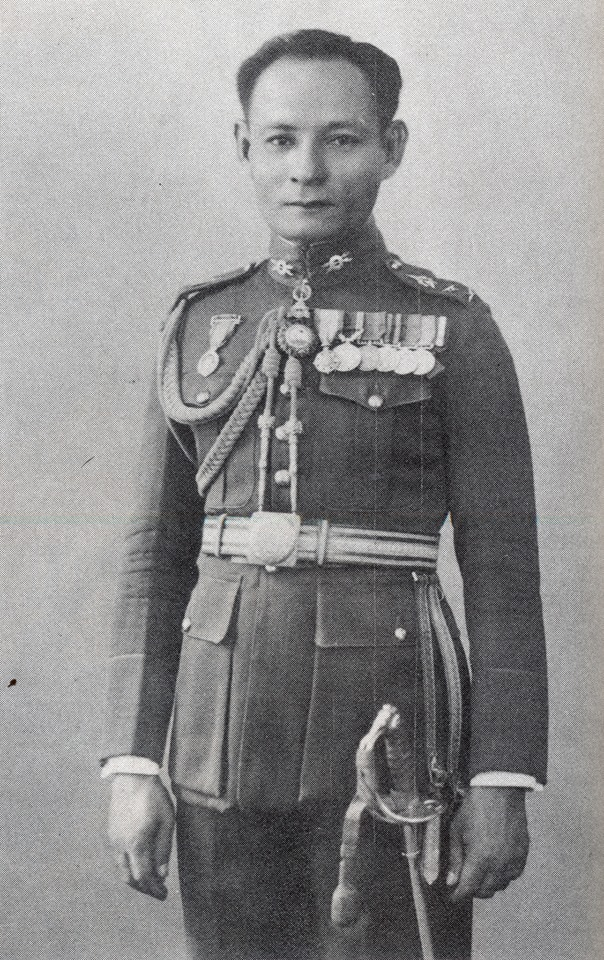
- Charun c.1940

Minister of Transport
- In office 8 September 1942 – 1 August 1944
- Prime Minister: Plaek Phibunsongkhram
- Preceded by: Khuang Aphaiwong
- Succeeded by: Khuang Aphaiwong

Minister of Commerce
- In office 10 March – 8 September 1942
- Prime Minister: Plaek Phibunsongkhram
- Preceded by: Sindh Kamalanavin
- Succeeded by: Khuang Aphaiwong

Deputy Minister of Defence of Thailand
- In office 26 September 1941 – 7 March 1942 Serving with Mangkon Phomyothi
- Prime Minister: Plaek Phibunsongkhram
- Preceded by: Mangkon Phomyothi
- Succeeded by: Phichit Kriangsakphichit
Other offices 1934–1946
Governor of the State Railway of Thailand
In office 1 July 1951 – 10 September 1959
Preceded by	himself as Director-General
Succeeded by	Sawai Sawaisanyakon
Director-General of the State Railway of Thailand
In office 11 November 1949 – 30 June 1951
Preceded by	Pun Sakuntanak
Succeeded by	himself as Governor
In office 6 May – 30 July 1942
Preceded by	Khuang Aphaiwong (acting)
Succeeded by	Chalo Sithanakon
In office 1 February 1936 – 10 March 1942
Preceded by	Phraya Udomyothathiyut
Succeeded by	Khuang Aphaiwong (acting)

Personal details
- Born: Charun (Note: At that time, Thailand did not have surnames); 27 October 1895 Bangkok, Siam
- Died: 19 July 1983 (aged 87) Bangkok, Thailand
- Party: Khana Ratsadon
- Spouses: Oep Komalavardhana (m. 1919; died 1949) Praphai Setthawat (m. 1952)
- Children: 2

Military service
- Allegiance: Siam; Thailand
- Branch/service: Royal Thai Army
- Years of service: 1904–1944
- Rank: General
- Commands: Phayap Army
- Battles/wars: Siamese Revolution; World War II; Franco-Thai War; Burma campaign

General Charun Rattanakun Seriroengrit (Thai: จรูญ รัตนกุล เสรีเริงฤทธิ์), t͡ɕàruːn ráttànákun sěːriːrɤːŋrít; October 27, 1895 – July 19, 1983) or Luang Seriroengrit (หลวงเสรีเริงฤทธิ์), was a Thai army officer, civil servant and politician. He was a general of the Phayap Army in the government of Plaek Phibunsongkhram in World War II.

== Careers ==
In the days of absolute monarchy, the captain Charun Rattanakun got the feudal title of honor Luang Seriroengrit awarded. He joined the Khana Ratsadon, which mean a Coup d'état in 1932 ended the absolute monarchy and replaced Thailand with a constitutional monarchy.

At the meantime Seriroengrit became a colonel and took off in 1938 an important position in the government of Plaek Phibunsongkhram. Later, he became head of the State Railway of Thailand.,

After the end of Franco-Thai War, he was promoted to Lieutenant general in February 1942 and moved to the head of Phayap Army (Northeast Army). He was involved to the Burma Campaign and held in the connection part of the occupation of Shan State.

== Family ==
A son from his marriage with Eop Komalavardhana was Colonel Aram Rattanakul Serireongrit. Colonel Aram married Princess Galyani Vadhana in 1944; their daughter is Than Phu Ying Dhasanawalaya Sornsongkram.

== Notes ==
Political offices
Preceded by Luang Chamnanyutthasin	Deputy Minister of Economics; 1939–1941	Succeeded by Luang Chamnannitikaset as Deputy Minister of Economy
Preceded by Luang Phromyothi	Deputy Minister of Defence; 1941–1942	Succeeded by Luang Phromyothi
Preceded by Luang Sinthusongkhramchai	Minister of Economy; 1942	Succeeded by Himself as Minister of Commerce
Preceded by Luang Sinthusongkhramchai	Minister of Economy; 1942	Succeeded by Khuang Aphaiwong as Minister of Transport
Preceded by Himself as Minister of Economy	Minister of Commerce; 1942	Succeeded by Khuang Aphaiwong
Preceded by Khuang Aphaiwong	Minister of Transport; 1942–1944	Succeeded by Khuang Aphaiwong
Military offices
First	Commander of the Phayap Army; 1942	Succeeded by Jira Wichitsongkhram
Civic offices
Preceded by Phra Udomyothathiyut	Director-General of the State Railway of Thailand; 1936–1942	Vacant Khuang Aphaiwong (acting) Title next held by Himself
Vacant Khuang Aphaiwong (acting) Title last held by Himself	Director-General of the State Railway of Thailand; 1942	Succeeded by Chalor Srithanakorn
Preceded by Pun Sakuntanak	Director-General of the State Railway of Thailand; 1949–1951	Succeeded by Himself as Governor of the State Railway of Thailand
Business positions
Preceded by Himself as Director-General of the State Railway of Thailand	Governor of the State Railway of Thailand; 1951–1959	Succeeded by Sawai Sawaiseanyakorn
