= Dhasanawalaya Sornsongkram =

Thai noblewoman

Than Phu Ying Dhasanawalaya Sornsongkram PChW MPCh
- ทัศนาวลัย ศรสงคราม
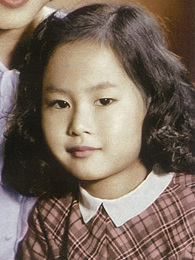
- Dhasanawalaya c. 1950s
- Born: Dhasanawalaya Ratanakul Serireongrit; 11 November 1945 (age 80); Geneva, Switzerland
- Education: Chulalongkorn University (BLitt)
- Spouse: Sinthu Sornsongkram (m. 1973)
- Children: Jitat Sornsongkram
- Parents: Aram Ratanakul Serireongrit; Princess Galyani Vadhana
- Relatives: Bhumibol Adulyadej (uncle); Vajiralongkorn (cousin)

Signature
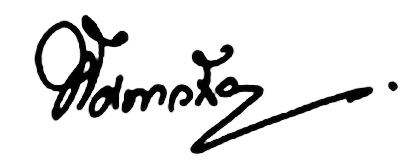

Than Phu Ying Dhasanawalaya Sornsongkram (Note: Thai: ทัศนาวลัย ศรสงคราม; Thai pronunciation: [tʰát.sà(ʔ).nāː.wá(ʔ).laj sǒːn.sǒŋ.kʰrāːm]; RTGS: Thatsanawalai Sonsongkhram) (née Dhasanawalaya Ratanakul Serireongrit (Note: Thai: ทัศนาวลัย รัตนกุล เสรีเริงฤทธิ์; RTGS: Thatsanawalai Rattanakun Serireongrit); born 11 November 1945 in Switzerland), is the only child of Galyani Vadhana, Princess of Naradhiwas and niece of King Bhumibol Adulyadej and elder cousin of King Vajiralongkorn (Rama X).

== Early life ==
Dhasanawalaya Ratanakul Serireongrit was born on November 11, 1945, in Switzerland. She is the only child of Galyani Vadhana, Princess of Naradhiwas and Colonel Aram Rattanakul Serireongrit, son of General Charun Rattanakun Seriroengrit.

At the age of 6, she returned to Thailand with her uncle, King Bhumibol and her aunt-in Law, Queen Sirikit, by ship. After arriving in Thailand, she continued her education at Mater Dei School, Triam Udom Suksa School and Faculty of Arts, Chulalongkorn University. After graduation, she continued her studies in Switzerland.

== Marriage ==
During her time studying in Switzerland, she met Sinthu Sornsongkram, who was a civil servant at the Royal Thai Embassy in Bern. They married on 12 November 1973. They have a son, Army Captain Jitat Sornsongkram.

== Career and later life ==
Than Phu Ying Dhasanawalaya Sornsongkram has been a lecturer in the Faculty of Economics, Chulalongkorn University.

She received her rank as Than Phu Ying on 5 May 1986. She was considered to be the closest grandchild of Srinagarindra, the Princess Mother.

== Honours ==
- Dame Grand Commander (Second Class, Upper Grade) of The Most Illustrious Order of Chula Chom Klao
- Dame Grand Cordon (Special Class) of The Most Exalted Order of the White Elephant
- Dame Grand Cordon (Special Class) of The Most Noble Order of the Crown of Thailand
- Dame Grand Cross (First Class) of The Most Admirable Order of the Direkgunabhorn
- King Rama IX Royal Cypher Medal, First Class
- King Rama X Royal Cypher Medal, First Class

== Notes ==
Order of precedence
| Preceded by Dame Sirikitiya Jensen | Thai order of precedence 13th position | Succeeded by Chao Khun Phra Sineenatha |
