= Galyani Vadhana =

Thai princess (1923–2008)

Galyani Vadhana; กัลยาณิวัฒนา
- Princess of Naradhiwas
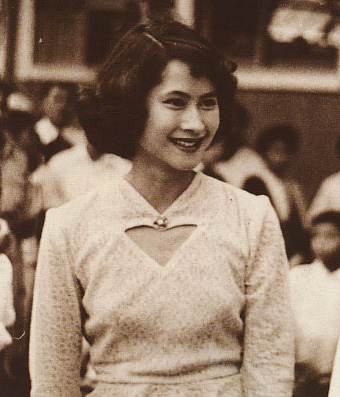
- Galyani Vadhana in 1944
- Born: Galyani Vadhana Mahidol; 6 May 1923; London, England, UK
- Died: 2 January 2008 (aged 84); Bangkok, Thailand
- Burial: 15 November 2008; Sanam Luang, Bangkok
- Spouses: Aram Rattanakul Serireongrit (m. 1944; div. 1950) Varananda Dhavaj (m. 1969; died 1990)
- Issue: Dhasanawalaya Sornsongkram
- House: Mahidol (by birth); Chudadhut (by marriage)
- Dynasty: Chakri
- Father: Mahidol Adulyadej
- Mother: Sangwan Talapat
- Religion: Theravada Buddhism

Galyani Vadhana, Princess of Naradhiwas (Note: Thai: กัลยาณิวัฒนา; Thai pronunciation: [kān.lā.jāː.ní.wát.tʰā.nāː]) (6 May 1923 – 2 January 2008) was a princess of Thailand and the elder sister of King Ananda Mahidol (Rama VIII) and King Bhumibol Adulyadej (Rama IX). She was also a direct granddaughter of King Chulalongkorn (Rama V) and Queen Sri Savarindira and the aunt of King Vajiralongkorn (Rama X).

== Biography ==
=== Early life ===
Galyani Vadhana was born on 6 May 1923 in London, England, the only daughter of Prince Mahidol Adulyadej of Songkla, the 69th son of King Chulalongkorn (Rama V) and seventh son by Queen Savang Vadhana, and Sangwan Talapat (later known as Srinagarindra, Princess Mother). She was initially named May Songkla and later named Her Serene Highness Galyani Vadhana Mahidol by King Vajiravudh (Rama VI). The word "Vadhana" in her name came from her paternal grandmother, Savang Vadhana. In 1927, King Prajadhipok (Rama VII) promoted her to the royal rank of Princess of Thailand (Her Highness).

=== Education ===
In 1935, Galyani Vadhana attended a secondary school for girls named École supérieure de jeunes filles de la ville de Lausanne. In 1938, she joined the International School of Geneva, the world's oldest international school (founded in 1924), where she lived as a boarder. She was an excellent student, and eventually came first of her school at the final exam and third in all Switzerland.

In 1942, Galyani Vadhana continued her studies in chemistry at the University of Lausanne. She graduated with a bachelor of science degree in chemistry in 1948. While pursuing her degree, she also studied social science and education for a Diplôme de Sciences Sociales Pédagogiques, involving teacher education, literature, philosophy, and psychology.

=== Marriage ===
In 1944, Galyani Vadhana renounced her royal status in order to marry Colonel Aram Rattanakul Serireongrit (24 August 1920 – 3 February 1982), the son of General Luang Serireongrit (Charun Rattanakun Seriroengrit), a former Army commander-in-chief who led the invasion of the Shan States during World War II. They had a daughter, Than Phu Ying Dhasanawalaya Ratanakul Serireongrit (later Sornsongkram) (born in 1945 in Switzerland). This marriage ended in divorce. In 1950, when her youngest brother ascended to the throne, he reinstated Vadhana's royal status.

In 1969, Galyani Vadhana married Prince Varananda Dhavaj (19 August 1922 – 15 September 1990), son of Prince Chudadhuj Dharadilok, Prince of Bejraburna and Mom Ravi Kayananda. They had no children.

=== Royal title ===
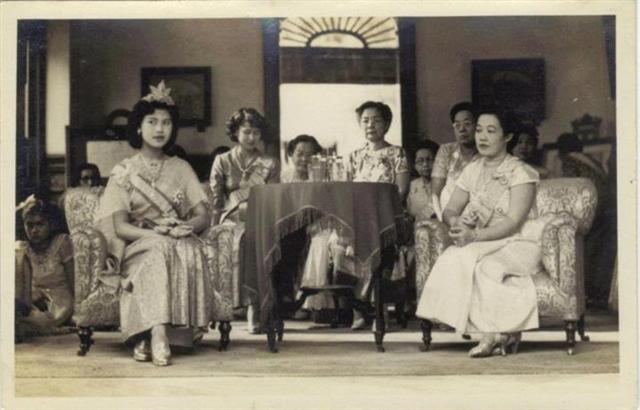
Queen Sirikit (Far left), Princess Galyani Vadhana (center), Princess Hemvadi, Princess Adisaya Suriyabha, Princess Adorn Dibyanibha and Queen Rambhai Barni (right) in 1950

On 6 May 1995, Galyani Vadhana's 72nd birthday, her brother King Bhumibol gave her the noble title "Kromma Luang Naradhiwas Rajanagarindra" (loosely translated, Princess of Naradhiwas), making her the only female member of the Chakri royal family to have been bestowed this title during Bhumibol's reign. In announcing the honour, Bhumibol said, "the Princess, who was his only sister, had shared the joys and sorrows of life since their early years and was the most highly respected in that she had always given him support. Furthermore, it is a well-known fact that she has been steadfast in her devotion to the King in order that He would enjoy grace and glory." She had represented Bhumibol in carrying out various royal duties and taken good care of their mother, which was a great relief to him.

=== Royal projects ===
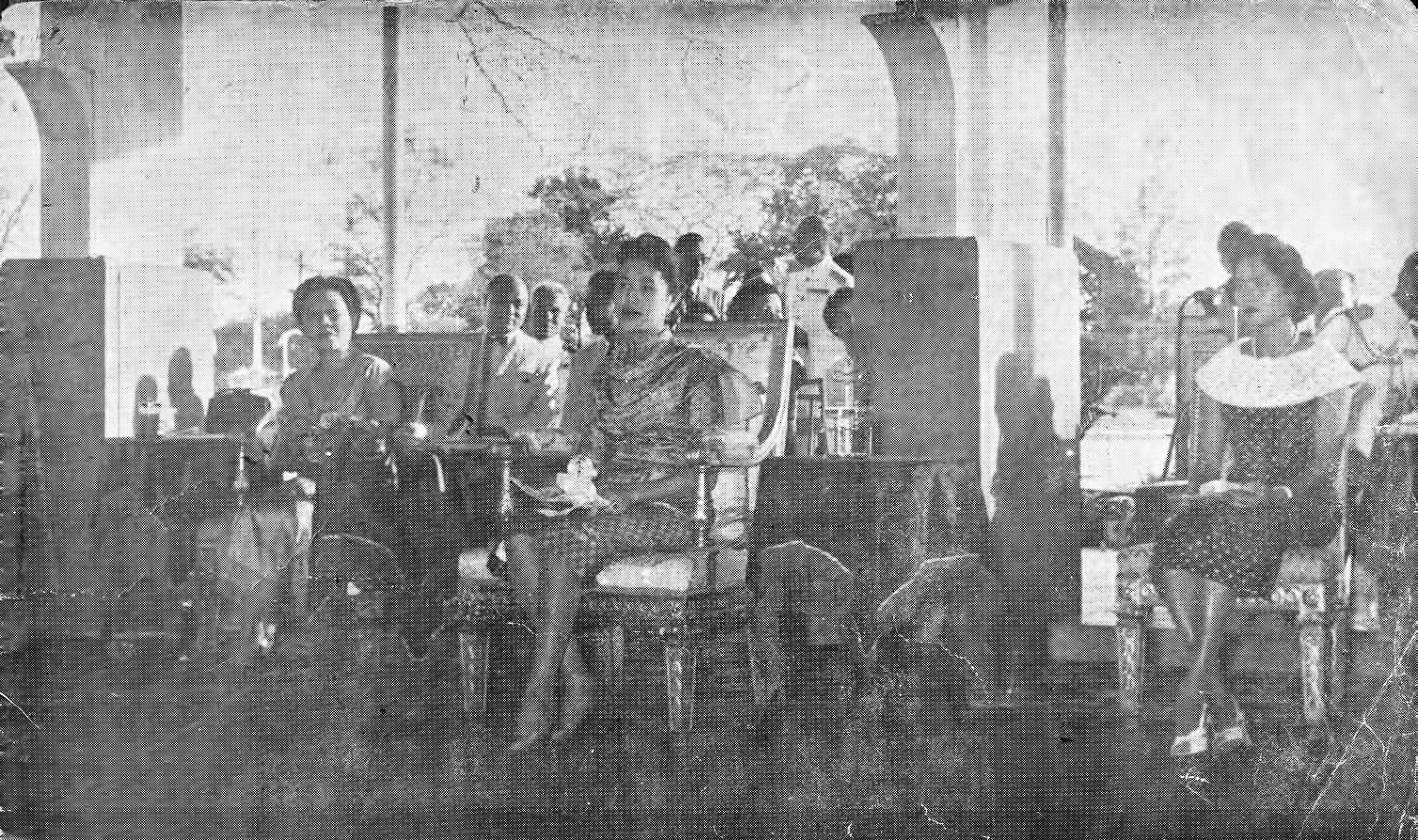
Princess Galyani Vadhana (right) attended a ball at Amphon Park, Bangkok with Queen Sirikit, regent of Thailand (center), her sister-in-law and former Queen Rambai Barni (left), her aunt in 1956.

Galyani Vadhana's royal patronage projects included traditional Thai arts, education, sports, and social welfare. She was president or honorary president of various organisations and foundations, including the Cardiac Children's Foundation, the Princess Mother's Charity Fund, and the Autistic Foundation of Thailand. She created her own foundation for funding the studies of young, gifted musicians.

She was a patron of various classical music foundations. On her trips, she always gathered important and useful information shown in the royal news, giving knowledge to people. She also wrote books, poetry, and spoke French. She traveled widely within Thailand and abroad to represent the royal family and her country on missions.

=== Health issues ===
Galyani Vadhana was admitted to Siriraj Hospital in June 2007, suffering from abdominal pains. The doctors found she had cancer, and she remained in the hospital for treatment. In October 2007, doctors reported that Galyani Vadhana had suffered an infarction on the left side of her brain as a result of occlusion of a cerebral artery.

At the same time in October, King Bhumibol was treated at Siriraj after experiencing weakness on his right side; doctors later found that he had a blood shortage to his brain. He was admitted on 13 October and discharged on 7 November. After leaving Siriraj, he visited Galyani Vadhana at the hospital almost daily.

On 14 December, the Royal Household Bureau released its 25th statement about Galyani Vadhana's health, saying she was feeling increasingly tired and was becoming less responsive.

=== Death ===
On 2 January 2008, the Royal Household Bureau announced that Galyani Vadhana's condition had worsened during the night of 1 January and she had died at 02:54 on 2 January, at Siriraj Hospital in Bangkok, Thailand, aged 84. There was to be a mourning period of 100 days starting from the day of her death. The prime minister announced that all government officials and agencies would wear black for 15 days while the cabinet would wear black for 100 days.

==== Funeral ====
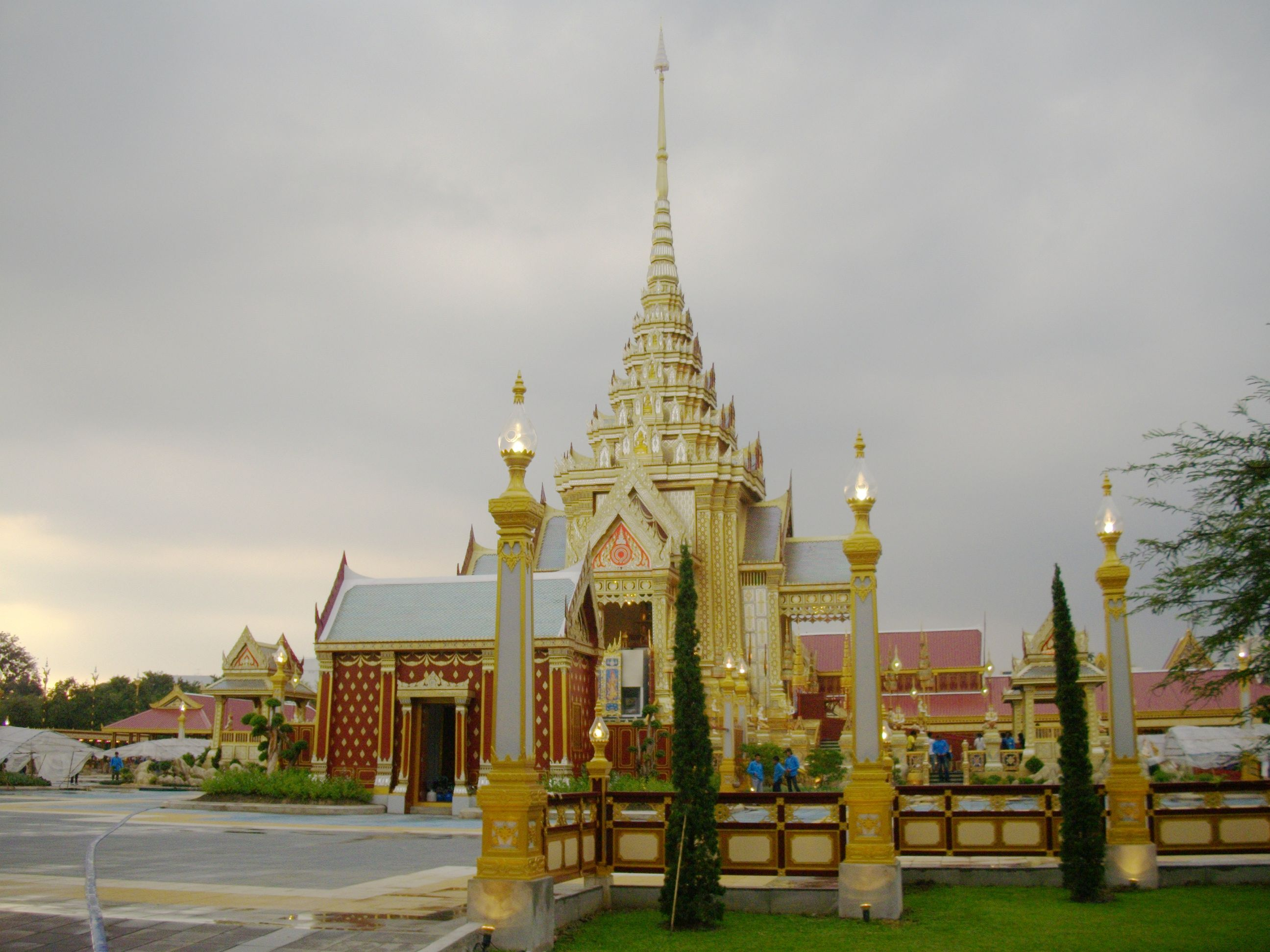
Royal crematorium

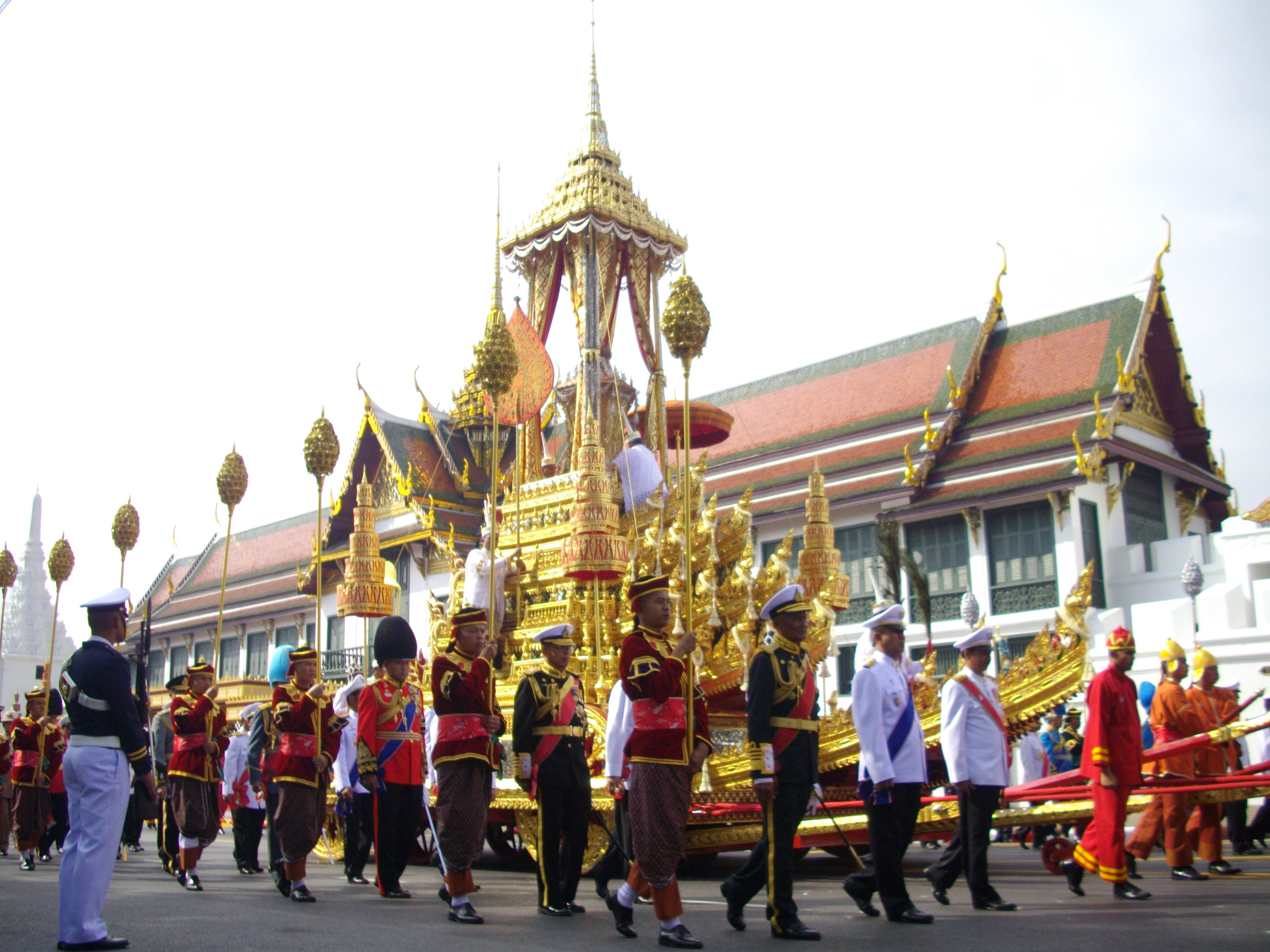
Procession, Princess Galyani Vadhana' royal urn

The 300 million-baht ($10 million, £7.1 million) funeral was the first full royal funeral since 1995, when the king's mother Srinagarindra was cremated. The six-day ceremony and ritual started on 14 November 2008 at the Grand Palace and ended on 19 November when Galyani Vadhana's ashes were transferred to the Rangsi Vadhana Memorial, Wat Ratchabophit Sathit Maha Simaram.

On 15 November, there were three processions from the royal throne hall, where she had lain in state for ten months, comprising 3,294 soldiers, flanked by conch shell-blowers, drummers, and musicians. Two of the processions involved the Phra Yannamat Sam Lam Khan (golden palanquin with three poles), an 18th-century seven-tonne palanquin carried by 60 men. The two-century-old sandalwood golden teak urn held Galyani Vadhana's body seated upright atop an elaborately decorated 14-tonne golden carriage.

Both dressed in white ceremonial dress, the Crown Prince and Prime Minister Somchai Wongsawat took part in the procession on Sanam Luang parade ground. In Uttaradit, black-dressed Thais flocked to the royally sponsored Wat Klong Poh in the provincial seat to place 400,000 sandalwood flowers at the crematorium.

At 22:00 on 15 November, the king and Queen Sirikit, with the help of a hydraulic tappet, set alight a 40-metre-high (130 ft) funeral pyre. The $5.7 m (£3.8 m) temporary royal crematorium, a complex of pavilions constructed on the Sanam Luang parade ground over seven months, had been decorated with flowers, garlands, and carved banana stalks. After the cremation, the funeral buildings were torn down. According to Hindu belief, Galyani Vadhana's spirit then returned home to Mount Meru, where all deities eternally live.

== Interests ==
=== Books and writing ===
Galyani Vadhana liked reading and writing from an early age. While studying Prathom 1 to Prathom 3, she read as many Thai language books as she could find, but children's books in Thai were then rare she often read the newspaper. She remembered reading a book in French—the 1878 novel Sans Famille—while studying in Switzerland, which she later found again.

During Galyani Vadhana's secondary studies, especially in Geneva, she read a lot of literature. She found that reading developed her French language skills. Later, while a French teacher at Thammasat University, she read many books on linguistics. She also studied art, culture, archaeology, and history for many years. When she planned to visit a foreign country, she would first read many books and documents about it.

When Galyani Vadhana was nine, she published a journal, Ruaen Rom, containing articles she had written with her friends at Srapathum Palace. Her mother supported her in reading and writing English. On 10 September 1932, she published a story she had written. In addition, she wrote 11 poems about the royal family, translated three books, and wrote ten tourist guidebooks and an academic article.

=== Photography ===
Galyani Vadhana was interested in photography. She had learned to take photographs not only as souvenirs but also for art and academic purposes. When she visited important places at home or abroad, she always took photographs of those she found interesting, which were useful in her travel writings.

=== Music ===
Galyani Vadhana studied Western art. She was interested in all types of music and drama, especially classical music by master composers. She began listening to classical music while studying in Switzerland. She had studied piano at home with her younger brothers, but only intermittently as she had very little time to practice. While doing her homework, she liked to listen to classical music on a radio.

In 2004, concerned about both the government's and the private sector's lack of interest in promoting classical music, Galyani Vadhana established a Fund for Classical Music Promotion, of which she became president. The fund supported classical music and related activities, provided assistance to Thai musicians to study, and promoted competitions and concerts in Thailand and internationally. She also supported the Bangkok Symphony Orchestra and the Chulalongkorn University Symphony Orchestra and was the patron of the Bangkok Opera.

=== Education ===
Galyani Vadhana was interested in all education, not only at universities. She believed that primary education is very important for developing the general population.

From her long experience in teaching French language, she realized the problem of interrupted French language study at mattayom (high school) and university level. In 1977 she formed L'Association Thailandaise des Professeurs de Français (The Association of Thai Professors Teaching French Language) to act as the center for meeting and exchanging experiences of – and improving – the teaching of French language in mattayom and university classes. She was president of the association between 1977 and 1981, when she became its honorary president for the rest of her life. Her assistance to the association took many forms, including in publishing journals to distribute the latest knowledge, writing her own articles in journals, and supporting teachers' seminars, research abroad and study in higher education.

As a result of her continuous work in the teaching and research of the French language in Thailand, she was conferred many honorary doctorates and also honors from many foreign governments and international organizations, including UNESCO.

=== Culture, archaeology, and history ===
Galyani Vadhana was interested in history and archaeology for many years. She thought these fields to be the foundations of other subjects and believed in applying reasoning to support historical ideas. She always said that her thoughts were not always correct and she would accept new data if supported by reason and evidences.

In performing her duties, she became interested in many important places, which she later visited by herself. She also led groups and associations on educational tours to many historic sites, and she advised fellow guides to emphasize education about the sites.

When visiting historical sites, she did not merely accept information given to her by the archaeologists, but she would research the sites beforehand, and deeply question experts about the site's restoration and excavation, and the impact on neighboring people of the archaeologists' operations.

== Duties ==
=== Medical Services and Public Health ===
==== The Cardiac Children Foundation of Thailand ====
This foundation was begun in 1981 by the Princess Mother. Galyani Vadhana became its patron on 15 June 1984. She added some of her personal property to her mother's fund provided personal advice, thus developing its activities. It helps many sick children, especially from poor families, to be cured and treated by professional cardiac doctors, using mechanical heart valve replacement, heart pacemaker, balloon catheter, and surgery without prosthesis. Furthermore, this foundation disseminates knowledge of cardiac diseases to doctors, nurses, and the public. It also provides funds for pediatricians to study cardiac diseases in children either in Thailand or abroad.

==== The HSH Princess Boonjirathorn (Chumphon) Juthathuj Foundation ====
This is a foundation set up by Princess Boonjirathorn Juthathuj on 27 June 1979 to provide scholarships and awards to medical and nursing students, nursing lecturers, and nurses affiliated with Ministry of Public Health. Its president was Galyani Vadhana, who chaired the scholarship and award conferring committee. The first prize-giving by Princess Boonjirathorn was organized at Samitivej Hospital on 18 September 1979. Afterwards scholarships and awards were given by Galyani Vadhana every year.

==== The Breast Foundation ====
This foundation was created in December 1994 from Charity Funds of the Princess Mother. Galyani Vadhana was president, while her mother was patron and honorary president. Its objective is to promote knowledge and understanding of breast cancer screening. The Breast Center was established in Siriraj Hospital to provide complete breast diseases examination and diagnosis. With the modern equipment in the center, the first in Thailand, breast radiography can be carried out to enable biopsies to be carried out accurately, correctly, with very little pain. It is also timesaving and less expensive.

==== The Mother Princess Medical Volunteer Foundation ====
In 1964, while the Mother Princess was staying at Phu Phing Palace, Chiang Mai, she realised how poor the local populace were especially in food and medicine. She set up "The Mother Princess Medical Volunteer Unit" on 22 February 1969, and persuaded doctors, dentists, pharmacists, and nurses to join the unit to go and treat patients in remote communities. On 21 May 1974, the unit was renamed to become "The Mother Princess Medical Volunteer Foundation" with the Mother Princess as its president.

Galyani Vadhana followed her mother's example in the foundation's daily operations. Together they would lead volunteers to visit and treat people in rural areas. Some patients were sent for treatment at the provincial central hospital or to Bangkok. They often journeyed by helicopters because some areas had no roads. After the Princess Mother died, Galyani Vadhana became president.

=== Nature and Environment Conservation ===
In 1991, Galyani Vadhana visited and stayed at Huai Nam Dang Watershed Management Unit. She found that the nearby forests were deteriorated as a result of agricultural reclamation, so she had the idea of forming a Royal Forest Department to restore the forests. Then in 1995, the Royal Forest Department designated this area as Huai Nam Dang National Park, and built a chalet-style palace, which Galyani Vadhana named "Silver Orchids Palace", dedicated to her. She stayed there during late January and early February every year to visit nearby hill tribes. Her thinking was that the public and local administration organization co-operate to look after forest, water, wildlife, and rare flora to maintain natural balance.

=== Foreign affairs ===
Galyani Vadhana traveled abroad many times on formal and private visits. In addition to strengthening friendly relations with those countries, her visits helped spread knowledge of Thai culture and customs. Before any such visit she would carry out careful research.

After most of these visits, she collected her notes and the information she had gathered to publish books or reproduce them in digital media for distribution.

In 2003 she visited Gretzenbach in Switzerland to officially dedicate the Wat Srinagarindravararam, a temple named in honour of her mother.

== Memorials ==
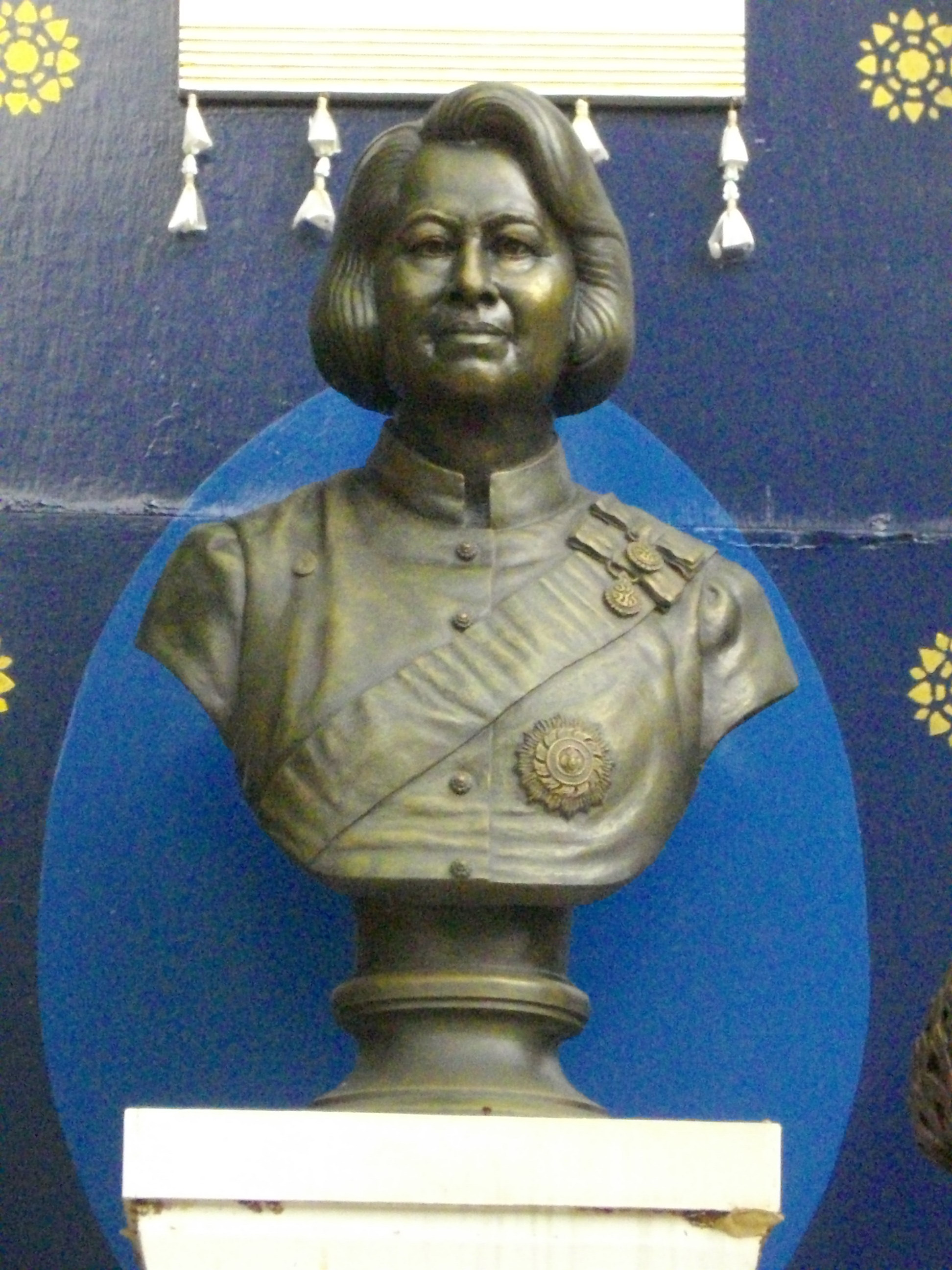
Bust of Princess Galyani Vadhana at Silpakorn University

=== Galyani Vadhana Building ===
The Galyani Vadhana Building is in Priest Hospital, Bangkok. It has nine storeys and 15,096 m^{2} (162,490 sq ft) usable area. With Galyani Vadhana's support, the Kidney Foundation of Thailand coordinated with the Ministry of Public Health in its construction. The Government Lottery Office provided funds for it. Following the celebration of Galyani Vadhana's seventy-second birthday in 1995, her permission was sought to name the building after her, which she permitted, and dedicated it on 20 May 1994. The building supports the treatment of terminal chronic renal failure patients with 46 artificial kidney machines.

=== Naradhiwas Rajanagarindra Road ===
Naradhiwas Rajanagarindra Road runs through Bang Rak, Sathon, and Yan Nawa Districts of Bangkok. It is built of ferroconcrete with eight 60-metre-wide (200 ft) lanes. Its length is 5,115 kilometres (3,178 mi) from Surawongse Road in Bang Rak District in the southeast and meets Rama III Road in Yan Nawa District. It was included as an approach road project in the fourth Bangkok Development Plan (1992–1996). Upon completion, the Bangkok Metropolitan Administration asked for permission to name it for Galyani Vadhana, and the king consented in 1996.

=== Naradhiwas Rajanagarindra Hospital ===
Naradhiwas Rajanagarindra Hospital is a general hospital with 407 beds, in Mueang Narathiwat District, Narathiwat Province. Originally just a medical station, in 1952 the Ministry of Public Health upgraded it to "Narathiwat Hospital". Later when Galyani Vadhana was bestowed the title Naradhiwas Rajanagarindra, the hospital board requested the Ministry of Public Health to give the new hospital a name, and the king named it "Naradhiwas Rajanagarindra Hospital" on 28 February 1997.

=== Princess of Naradhiwas University ===
Princess of Naradhiwas University was established by an act of 9 February 2005 merging all educational institutions in Narathiwat Province. Those institutions were Naradhiwas Technical College, Naradhiwas Agricultural and Technology College, Takbai Vocational College, and Boromarjonani College of Nursing.

=== Galyanivadhanakarun Hospital ===
Galyanivadhanakarun Hospital is a university teaching hospital of the Faculty of Medicine, Princess of Naradhiwas University which opened in December 2014.

== Writings ==
=== About the royal family ===
- Busy Fingers
- Postcard Games
- Prince Mahidol and Art
- Popular Chronicle From The Press, The Demise of the Princess Mother

=== Translation ===
- Le Couronnement Espagnol – The Spanish Coronation

=== Travelogue ===
- Yunnan
- Bhutan : Green Island on Land
- Is It Cold in Siberia?
- Turkey : Land of the Roman Emperors and Ottoman Sultans
- Xinjiang and Gansu : Pictures from Far Away Places
- Eastern China : Mountain, Lake, Temples

== Foundations and associations ==
=== As honorary president ===
- The Mother Princess Medical Volunteer Foundation
- The Prosthesis Foundation of H.R.H. The Princess Mother
- L'Association Thaïlandaise des Professeurs de Français
- The Siam Society Under Royal Patronage
- The World Tipiṭaka Presentation Worldwide

=== As president ===
- The Kidney Foundation of Thailand
- The Breast Foundation
- Siriraj Foundation

=== As patron ===
- The Foundation for Slum Child Care (FSCC)
- The Cardiac Children Foundation of Thailand (CCFT)
- The Green World Foundation (GWF)
- Bangkok Biomaterial Center
- Joe Louis Puppet Theatre
- Bangkok Opera Foundation (from 2001 to 2006)

== Honors ==
=== Decorations ===
==== From the King of Thailand ====
- Dame of the Most Illustrious Order of the Royal House of Chakri
- Dame of the Ancient and Auspicious Order of the Nine Gems
- Dame Grand Cross of the Most Illustrious Order of Chula Chom Klao
- Dame Grand Cordon of the Most Exalted Order of the White Elephant
- Dame Grand Cordon of the Most Noble Order of the Crown of Thailand
- Dame Grand Cross of the Most Admirable Order of the Direkgunabhorn
- Member of the Order of Symbolic Propitiousness Ramkeerati – Boy Scout Citation Medal (Special Class)
- Freemen Safeguarding Medal (First Class)
- King Rama VIII Royal Cypher Medal (First Class)
- King Rama IX Royal Cypher Medal (First Class)
- Red Cross Medal of Merit

==== From French Republic ====
- Commander of the Order of Arts and Letters in 1979
- Commander of the National Order of Merit in 1997
- Grand Officier of the Legion of Honour – 25 December 2007

=== Awards ===
- Victor Hugo Medal, from UNESCO, in 1992
- Naratip Award, from The Writers Association of Thailand, in 2002
- WHO/SEARO Award, from Regional Office for South East Asia of World Health Organization, in 2003

=== Honorary Degrees ===
- Honorary Doctor of Arts in French, Chiang Mai University
- Honorary Doctor of Arts in History, Prince of Songkla University
- Honorary Doctor of Education, Chulalongkorn University
- Honorary Doctor of Dentistry, Prince of Songkla University
- Honorary Doctor of Arts in French, Khon Kaen University
- Honorary Doctor of Nursing Science, Khon Kaen University
- Honorary Doctor of Nursing Science, Sukhothai Thammathirat University
- Honorary Doctor of Science in Chemistry, Khon Kaen University
- Honorary Doctor of Medicine, Srinakharinwirot University
- Honorary Doctor of Science in Community Public Health, Rajabhat Rajanagarindra University

=== Military rank ===
- General, Admiral and Air Chief Marshal

=== Academic rank ===
- Professor of Thammasat University

== Titles ==
Styles of: Princess Galyani Vadhana; Princess of Naradhiwas
- Reference style: Her Royal Highness
- Spoken style: Your Royal Highness
- Alternative style: Ma'am

- 6 May 1923 – 8 November 1927 : Her Serene Highness Princess Galyani Vadhana Mahidol
- 8 November 1927 – 10 July 1934 : Her Highness Princess Galyani Vadhana
- 10 July 1934 – 11 July 1944 : Her Royal Highness Princess Galyani Vadhana
- 11 July 1944 – 25 March 1950 : Mrs. Galyani Vadhana Ratanakul Serireongrit
- 25 March 1950 – 6 May 1995 : Her Royal Highness Princess Galyani Vadhana
- 6 May 1995 – 2 January 2008 : Her Royal Highness Princess Galyani Vadhana, Princess of Naradhiwas

The Princess's style and title in full: Somdet Phra Chao Phi Nang Thoe Chao Fa Galyani Vadhana Krom Phra Naradhiwas Rajanagarindra (Thai: สมเด็จพระเจ้าพี่นางเธอ เจ้าฟ้ากัลยาณิวัฒนา กรมหลวงนราธิวาสราชนครินทร์)

Royal cypher of Princess Galyani Vadhana

Royal flag of Princess Galyani Vadhana

== Issue ==
Name	Birth	Marriage		Their children
Name	Birth	Date	Spouse	Their children
Dhasanawalaya Rattanakul Serireongrit	11 November 1945 (age 80)	12 November 1973	Sinthu Sornsongkram	Jitat Sornsongkram

== Note ==
Galyani Vadhana House of Mahidol Cadet branch of the House of Chakri Born: 6 May 1923 Died: 2 January 2008
Order of precedence
Preceded by Princess Srinagarindra	Eldest Royal Member of the Chakri Dynasty; 1995–2008	Succeeded by Princess Bejaratana Rajasuda
Non-profit organization positions
Preceded by Srinagarindra	President of Princess Mother's Medical Volunteer; 1995–2008	Succeeded by Chulabhorn
