= Phayap Army =

Thai invasion force in the Burma Campaign of World War II

- กองทัพพายัพ
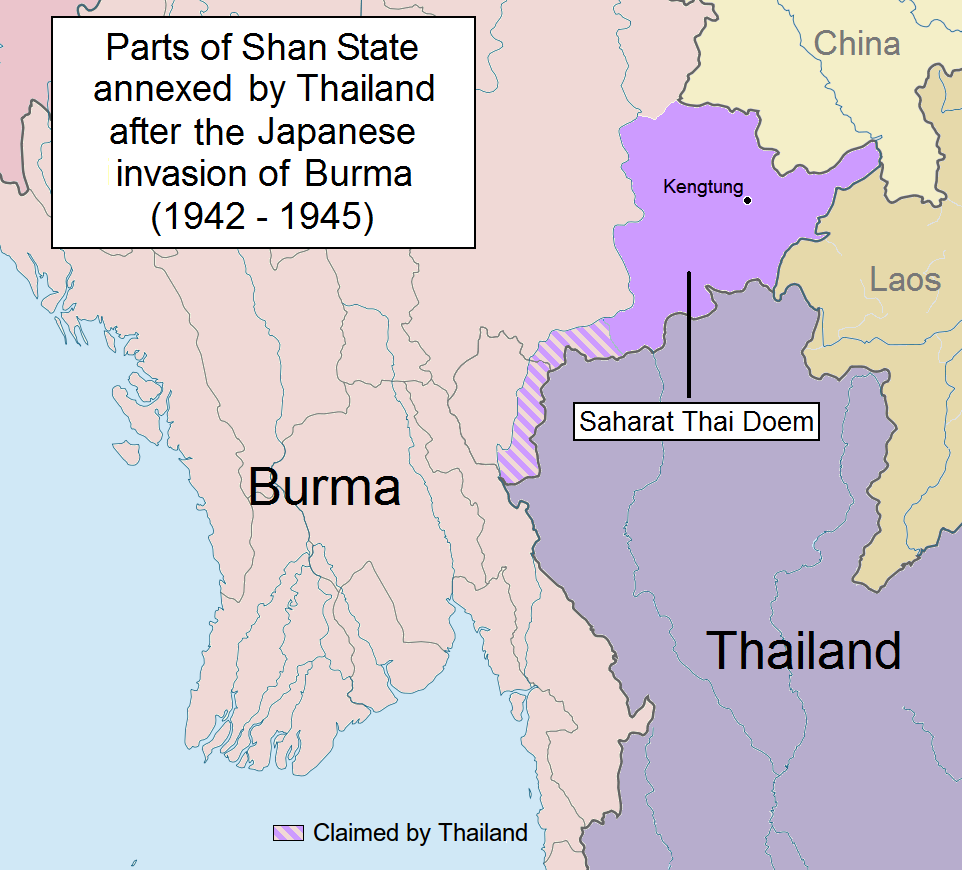
- The occupied areas under the Phayap Army
- Active: May 1942 – August 1945
- Country: Thailand
- Allegiance: Royal Thai Armed Forces Headquarters
- Branch: Royal Thai Army; Royal Thai Air Force
- Type: Air force Armoured cavalry Cavalry; Infantry
- Size: Field army
- Garrison/HQ: Kengtung
- Mottos: ชาติ ศาสนา พระมหากษัตริย์ (Nation, Religion, and Monarchy)
- Engagements: World War II: Burma campaign

Commanders
- Notable commanders: Lieutenant General Charun Rattanakun Seriroengrit; Major General Phin Choonhavan

Phayap Army (Thai: กองทัพพายัพ; RTGS: Kong Thap Phayap; lit. 'Northwest Army') was the hastily combined forces between the Royal Thai Army (RTA) and the Royal Thai Air Force (RTAF) that invaded the Siamese Shan States (present day Shan State, Myanmar) of Burma on 10 May 1942 during the Burma campaign of World War II.

== History ==
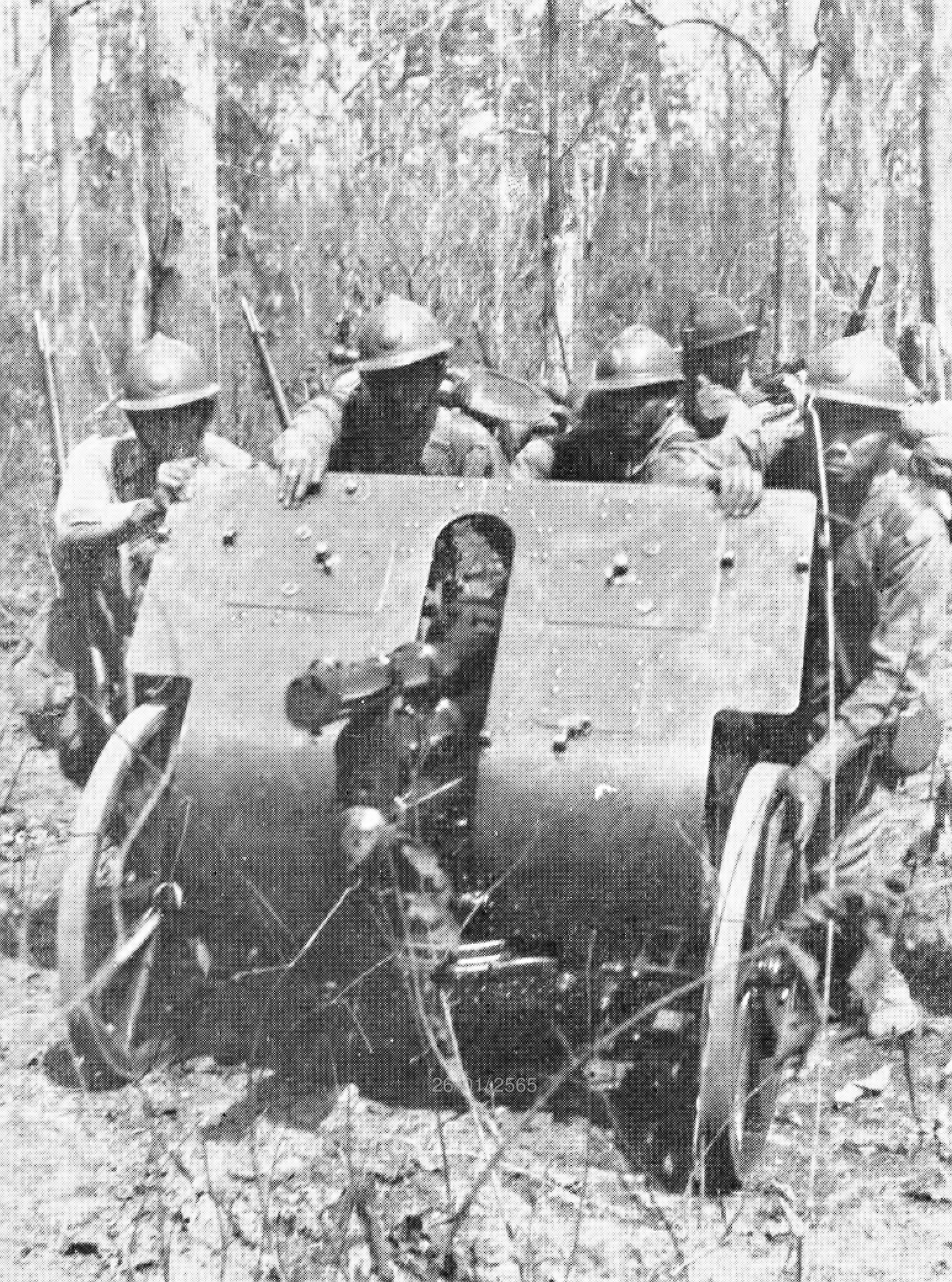
Thai Phayap army soldiers wearing Adrian helmets, carrying artillery in Burma, 1943.

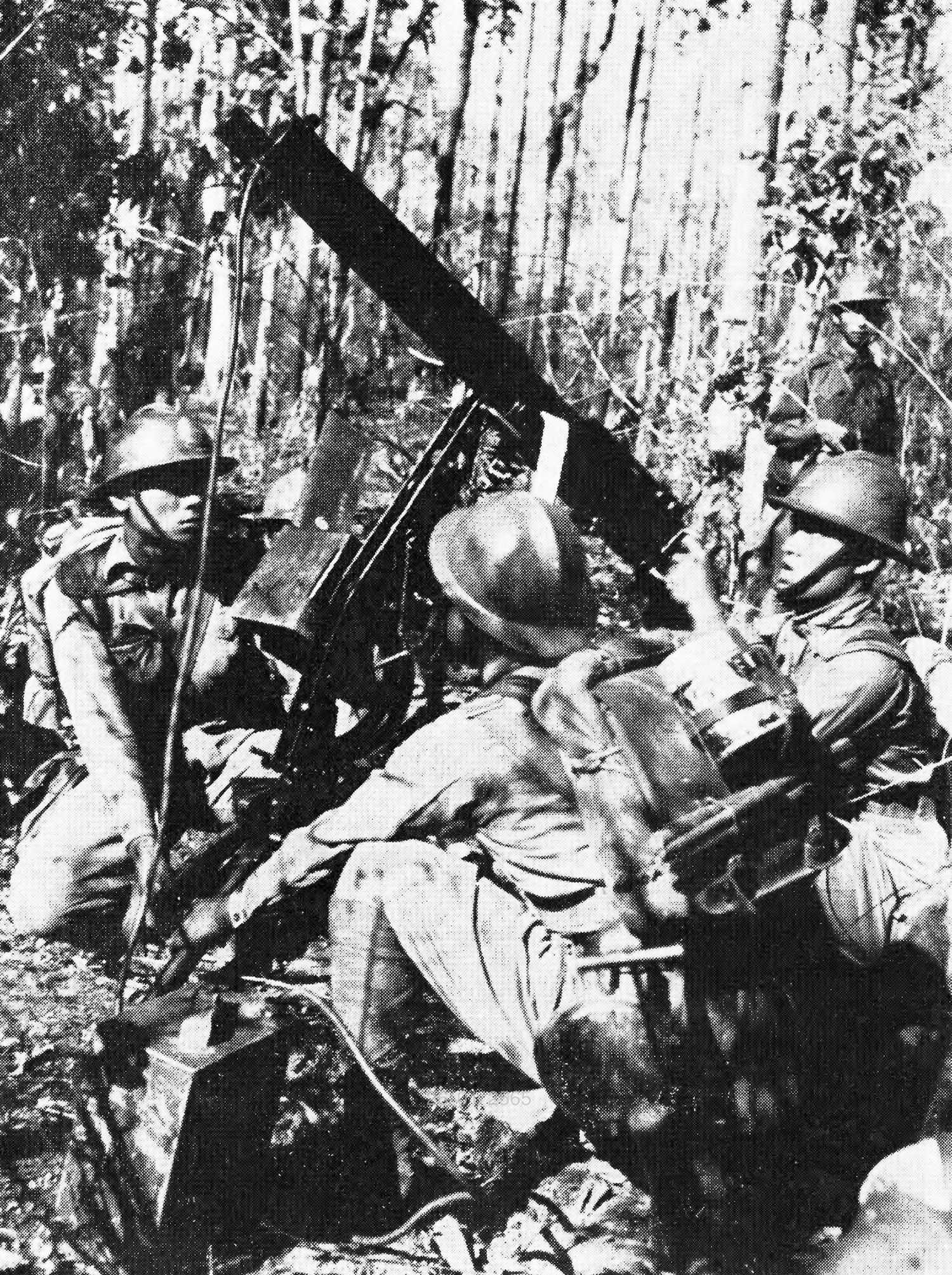
Thai Phayap army fighting in the Burma campaign, 1943.

On 8 December 1941, Japanese troops entered Thailand by land and sea. There had been clashes between Thai soldiers and Japanese soldiers in many southern provinces. Finally, the Thai and Japanese governments had negotiated and agreed to a joint war alliance with the Japanese on 25 January 1942. When Thailand joined the Axis powers, the Thai government had to declare war on the Allies and was forced to use military force to support the combat operations of the Imperial Japanese Army (IJA) by moving the troops of the Royal Thai Army (RTA) to capture Kengtung to be the defense of Burma, which was a territory controlled by the British Raj. In addition, the signing of the principle of cooperation between Thailand and Japan (14 December 1941), the Royal Thai Army was responsible for raising forces to seize the Thai-Burma border, and to maintain the western coast in southern Thailand.

On 21 December 1941, the Thai government and the Japanese government signed a formal alliance agreement that was the Japan-Thai Alliance Pact, causing the Royal Thai Army to prepare a hastily assembled combat force from the two armed forces comprising the Royal Thai Army and the Royal Thai Air Force (RTAF) across the country. At that time, the Royal Thai army had just finished the Franco-Thai War only 7 months before, and the equipment of many units was in the process of being repaired. The Royal Thai army had to hurry to organize an army, and divided the force into 3 main parts: the reserve force, the Phayap Army, and territorial defense force, and communications. The organization of the Phayap Army used the 4th Army Circle in Nakhon Sawan as the Headquarters, which consisted of 1st Signal Battalion (Nakhon Sawan), 10th Artillery Battalion (Nakhon Sawan), 28th Infantry Battalion (Nakhon Sawan), 29th Infantry Battalion (Phitsanulok), 30th Infantry Battalion (Lampang), and 31st Infantry Battalion (Chiang Mai). Division of the Command of the Western Army was appointed to Lieutenant General Luang Sereeruengrit, with the Payap Army Headquarters located at the British Consulate in Lampang Province (in the beginning, located in Nakhon Sawan). As for the command of the Phayap Army, Lieutenant General Charun Rattanakun Seriroengrit (aka Luang Seriroengrit) was appointed as a commander, then set up a headquarters at the British Consulate in Lampang Province (in the beginning, located in Nakhon Sawan). In addition to Lt. Gen. Luang Seriroengrit as commander, there were also other high-ranking military officers, including;

- Major General Luang Phairirayordejd, Commander of the 2nd Infantry Division, located in Chiang Mai Province.
- Major General Phin Choonhavan, Commander of the 3rd Infantry Division, is located in Chiang Rai Province.
- Major General Luang Haansongkhram, Commander of the 4th Infantry Division, is located in Chiang Rai Province.
- Colonel Thwuan Wichaikhatkha, Commander of the Cavalry Division, located in Chiang Rai Province
- Air Marshal Luang Atuegtevadej, Royal Thai Air Force commander
- Air Vice Marshal Luang Tevaritpanluek, Deputy Royal Thai Air Force commander
- Air Vice Marshal Fuen Ronnaphagrad Ritthakhanee, Chief of Staff of the Air Force Field and the Phayap Army's commander of the Wings Mixed

Subsequently, the Imperial Japanese Army requested the Thai government to send troops into operation in Shan State (Kengtung) was the invasion of troops into the northernmost area of the former Siamese Shan States, because the Imperial Japanese Army wanted Royal Thai Army to be a right-wing defense against the enemy in the rear for the Imperial Japanese Army in Burma. In early 1942, Chinese forces led by Generalissimo Chiang Kai-shek invaded the former Siamese Shan States, when the Imperial Japanese Army had to invade Burma's territory to the Indian border The Imperial Japanese Army's rear line would become a weak point for British and Chinese troops to attack the Imperial Japanese Army's rear line.

The deployment of the Phayap Army troops to Kengtung faced the same problems as in the Franco-Thai War. Although most of the veterans were experienced at jungle and mountain warfare, they faced the same problem as in the Franco-Thai War, namely, the unpreparedness of combat support and new soldiers with no real combat experience. Additionally, the nature of the war led to more problems because the troops had to move long distances into foreign lands with mountainous terrain, tropical dry forest terrain, and inclement weather. As a result, some soldiers in the army fell ill from a lack of clothing and medicine.

On 5 June 1942, Major General Phin Choonhavan, Commander of the 3rd Infantry Division, moved to capture the city of Kengtung, but after a while, more than 30 percent of the division's soldiers became ill with malaria and dysentery. Until having to send a telegram for help to the Phayap Army Headquarters to deliver medicines and medical supplies to the soldiers in Kengtung, but with difficult and delayed transportation, causing the soldiers to fall ill, up to 50 percent of the whole division. During the 3rd Infantry Division's military occupation of Kengtung, soldiers had to face disease and also the problem of a shortage of supplies and clothing. In the first phase of the movement of troops of the 3rd Infantry Division from Nakhon Ratchasima Province to Lampang Province, each soldier was given only one outfit, because during the Franco-Thai War, the supply of uniforms was exhausted.

After capturing all the Shan State areas, the Thai government has established a new Siamese Shan State with Maj. Gen. Phin Choonhavan as governor and promoted from Major General to Lieutenant General. The Royal Thai Armed Forces Supreme Command Headquarters (RTARFSCH) had also ordered to establishment of a field police department to perform administrative duties, law enforcement, maintain order in occupied areas, and suppress the insurgency in the occupied areas. These field police would sometimes act in violation of human rights.

Then, the Phayap Army began to withdraw from the former Siamese Shan States remaining strength as necessary to support administrative officials, namely the Office of the former Siamese Shan States Military Governor (OSSSMG). Along with the establishment of three courts at Kengtung, Muang Hang, and Muang Sat having the same jurisdiction as provincial courts in Thailand, but the judgments of these three courts are absolute no appeals or petitions. Keeping the peace and law enforcement is the duty of the field police.

When the Empire of Japan surrendered on 14 August 1945, the Thai government rushed to declare peace and return these territories to the United Kingdom, but in good faith, the term "Siamese Shan States" appeared in history only for a short time. The rest of the Phayap Army had to withdraw their forces from the area back to Thailand, and disbanded later.

== Order of Battle of the Phayap Army 1942 ==
Phayap Army (Northern Army) – Lieutenant General Charun Rattanakun Seriroengrit

- 2nd Infantry Division – Major General Luang Phairirayordejd
  - 4th Infantry Regiment (Prachinburi), which consisted of
    - 10th Infantry Battalion (Prachinburi)
    - 11th Infantry Battalion (Prachinburi)
    - 12th Infantry Battalion (Prachinburi)
  - 5th Infantry Regiment, which consisted of
    - 13th Infantry Battalion
    - 14th Infantry Battalion
    - 15th Infantry Battalion
  - 12th Infantry Regiment (Phitsanuloke), which consisted of
    - 28th Infantry Battalion (Nakhon Sawan)
    - 29th Infantry Battalion (Phitsanulok)
    - 33rd Infantry Battalion (Phitsanulok)
  - 4th Artillery Battalion (Prachinburi)
  - 5th Artillery Battalion (Prachinburi)
  - 6th Artillery Battalion
  - Attached:
    - 5th Cavalry Battalion / Cavalry Division
    - Tank squadron / Armoured Regiment
- 3rd Infantry Division – Major General Phin Choonhavan
  - 7th Infantry Regiment (Nakhon Ratchasima), which consisted of
    - 19th Infantry Battalion (Nakhon Ratchasima)
    - 20th Infantry Battalion (Nakhon Ratchasima)
    - 21st Infantry Battalion (Nakhon Ratchasima)
  - 8th Infantry Regiment (Surin), which consisted of
    - 17th Infantry Battalion
    - 18th Infantry Battalion
    - 52nd Infantry Battalion
  - 9th Infantry Regiment (Ubon Ratchathani), which consisted of
    - 25th Infantry Battalion (Ubon Ratchathani)
    - 26th Infantry Battalion (Ubon Ratchathani)
    - 27th Infantry Battalion (Ubon Ratchathani)
  - 7th Artillery Battalion (Nakhon Ratchasima)
  - 8th Artillery Battalion (Nakhon Ratchasima)
  - 9th Artillery Battalion
  - Motorcycle Reconnaissance Squadron
  - Tank squadron
- 4th Infantry Division – Major General Luang Haansongkhram
  - 3rd Infantry Regiment (Lopburi), which consisted of
    - 4th Infantry Battalion (Lopburi)
    - 6th Infantry Battalion (Lopburi)
    - 8th Infantry Battalion (Saraburi)
  - 13th Infantry Regiment (Lampang), which consisted of
    - 30th Infantry Battalion (Lampang)
    - 31st Infantry Battalion (Chiang Mai)
    - 34th Infantry Battalion (Lampang)
  - 3rd Artillery Battalion
  - 10th Artillery Battalion (Nakhon Sawan)
- Cavalry Division – Colonel Thwuan Wichaikhatkha
  - 35th Cavalry Regiment, which consisted of
    - 3rd Cavalry Battalion (Ubon Ratchathani)
    - 5th Cavalry Battalion (Roi Ed)
  - 46th Cavalry Regiment, which consisted of
    - 4th Cavalry Battalion (Chanthaburi)
    - 6th Cavalry Battalion
- Tank Battalion
- 12th Independent Cavalry Regiment, which consisted of
  - 1st Cavalry Battalion (Bangkok)
  - 2nd Cavalry Battalion (Prachinburi)
- 35th Infantry Battalion (Chiang Mai)
- 1st Engineer Battalion (Ratchaburi)
- 2nd Engineer Battalion (Chachoengsao)
- 3rd Engineer Battalion
- 4th Engineer Battalion
- 1st Artillery Battalion (Bangkok)
- 11th Artillery Battalion
- Phayap Army AA Battalion
- Phayap Army Transport Battalion
- Phayap Army Water Transport Battalion

=== Reorganization ===
During the fighting, the Phayap Army has added the following units by regrouping.

- The 17th Infantry Regiment (Battlefield), which consisted of
  - 32nd Infantry Battalion (Nakhon Sawan)
  - 35th Infantry Battalion (Chiang Mai)
  - 39th Infantry Battalion (Nakhon Si Thammarat)

Bad weather forced the early dissolution of the cavalry division and moved the 35th Cavalry Regiment to Roi Et and the 1st Cavalry Battalion (Royal Guard using Australian stallions) back to BKK.

Nevertheless, the RTA created the following units to replace the cavalry units in the Phayap Army:

- 11th Heavy Machine Gun Battalion
- 1st Machine Gun Battalion
- 2nd Machine Gun Battalion
- 27th Artillery Battalion
- 29th Artillery Battalion

=== 2nd Army ===
After peace in Kentung had been restored in 1943, the Royal Thai Army had withdrawn some units of the Phayap Army and created the 2nd Army as a reserve force.

In 1943, RTA created the 2nd Army (Lopburi), which consisted of

- 1st Division (Chiang Rak), which consisted of
  - 1st Infantry Regiment (Bangkok), which consisted of
    - 1st Infantry Battalion (Royal Guard) (Bangkok)
    - 3rd Infantry Battalion (Bangkok)
    - 9th Infantry Battalion (Bangkok)
  - 2nd Infantry Regiment (Bangkok), which consisted of
    - 2nd Infantry Battalion (Bangkok)
    - 7th Infantry Battalion (Bangkok)
    - 37th Infantry Battalion (Ratburi)
    - 45th Infantry Battalion (Phetburi)
- 1st Cavalry Battalion (Moved out of Phayap Army back to Bangkok after dissolving the 12th Independent Cavalry Regiment due to the diseases that killed Australian horses used by the 1st Cavalry Battalion)
- 1st Artillery Battalion
- 7th Division (Lopburi) consisted of
  - 19th Infantry Regiment (Bua Chum, Chai Badan district of Lopburi), which consisted of
    - 58th Infantry Battalion (Bua Chum, Chai Badan district of Lopburi)
    - 59th Infantry Battalion (Bua Chum, Chai Badan district of Lopburi)
  - 20th Infantry Regiment (Lom Sak district of Phetchabun)
    - 60th Infantry Battalion (Lom Sak district of Phetchabun)
    - 61st Infantry Battalion (Lom Sak district of Phetchabun)
  - 21st Infantry Regiment (Wang Chomphoo in Lom Kao district of Phetchabun)
    - 62nd Infantry Battalion (Wang Chomphoo in Lom Kao district of Phetchabun)
    - 63rd Infantry Battalion (Wang Chomphoo in Lom Kao district of Phetchabun)
    - 64th Infantry Battalion (Wang Chomphoo in Lom Kao district of Phetchabun)
  - 12th Infantry Regiment (Moved out of Phayap Army back to Nakhon Sawan) consisted of
    - 28th Infantry Battalion (Nakhon Sawan)
    - 65th Infantry Battalion (Nakhon Sawan)
  - 6th Inf. Reg (Move out of Phayap Army back to Phitsanulok) consisted of
    - 29th Inf. Bat. (Phitsanulok) – separated from the 12th Inf. Reg
    - 66th Inf. Bat. (Nakhon Sawan)
    - 67th Inf. Bat. (Tak)

=== 37th Division ===
In 1944, the Royal Thai Army created the following units to help train the Seri Thai (Free Thai Movement).

- 37th Division (Nakhon Ratchasima), which consisted of
  - 107th Infantry Regiment (Nakhon Ratchasima)
  - 35th Cavalry Regiment (Roi Ed) – move from Phayap Army – consisted of
    - 3rd Cavalry Battalion (Ubon Ratchathani)
    - 5th Cavalry Battalion (Roi Et)
  - the 108th Infantry Regiment (Udon Thani – Nakhon Phanom)
  - The 9th Infantry Regiment (Ubon Ratchathani) – move from the Phayap Army.
    - 25th Infantry Battalion (Ubon Ratchathani)
    - 26th Infantry Battalion (Ubon Ratchathani)
    - 27th Infantry Battalion (Ubon Ratchathani)

=== Demobilization ===
After the peace declaration on 16 August 1945, the following units of the Phayap Army, along with wartime units, were dissolved and demobilized:

30 October 1945: The following units were dissolved and demobilized

- 11th Heavy Machine Gun Battalion
- 1st Machine Gun Battalion
- 2nd Machine Gun Battalion
- 27th Artillery Battalion
- 29th Artillery Battalion

13 November 1945: The following units were dissolved and demobilized

- Phayap Army HQ
- 2nd Army
- 7th Division
- 37th Division
- 18th Mixed Brigade at 4 States of Melayu
- 20th Infantry Regiment
- 107th Infantry Regiment.
- 4th Cavalry Battalion
- 6th Artillery Battalion
- 14th Artillery Battalion
- 32nd Infantry Battalion (Nakhon Sawan)
- 33rd Infantry Battalion (Reserved Forces)
- 34th Infantry Battalion (Lampang)
- 35th Infantry Battalion (Chiang Mai)
- 54th Infantry Battalion
- 56th Infantry Battalion
- 40th Infantry Battalion (Trang)
- 41st Infantry Battalion (Songkhla)

=== Postwar reorganization ===
The postwar reorganization of the Royal Thai Army in 1946:

- 1st Army Circle (Bangkok) consisted of
  - The 1st Infantry Regiment (Royal Guard) (Bangkok) – which consisted of
    - 1st Infantry Battalion (Royal Guard) (Bangkok)
    - 3rd Infantry Battalion (Royal Guard) (Bangkok)
    - 9th Infantry Battalion (Royal Guard) (Bangkok)
  - The 11th Infantry Regiment (Bangkok) – Renamed from the 2nd Infantry Regiment – which consisted of
    - 2nd Infantry Battalion (Bangkok)
    - 7th Infantry Battalion (Bangkok)
    - 37th Infantry Battalion (Ratchaburi)
    - 45th Infantry Battalion (Phetburi)
- 2nd Army Circle (Prachinburi) consisted of
  - 2nd Infantry Regiment (Lopburi) – Renamed from the 3rd Infantry Regiment, consisted of
    - 4th Infantry Battalion
    - 6th Infantry Battalion
    - 8th Infantry Battalion
  - 12th Infantry Regiment (Prachinburi) – Renamed from the 4th Infantry Regiment, which consisted of
    - 10th Infantry Battalion
    - 11th Infantry Battalion
    - 12th Infantry Battalion
- 3rd Army Circle consisted of
  - The 3rd Infantry Regiment (Nakhon Ratchasima) – Renamed from the 7th Infantry Regiment, consisted of
    - 19th Infantry Battalion
    - 20th Infantry Battalion
    - 21st Infantry Battalion
  - 13th Infantry Regiment (Ubon Ratchathani) – Renamed from the 9th Infantry Regiment, consisted of
    - 25th Infantry Battalion (Ubon Ratchathani)
    - 26th Infantry Battalion (Ubon Ratchathani)
    - 27th Infantry Battalion (Ubon Ratchathani)
- 4th Army Circle consisted of
  - 4th Infantry Regiment (Nakhon Sawan), which consisted of
    - 1st Signal Battalion (Nakhon Sawan)
    - 10th Artillery Battalion (Nakhon Sawan)
    - 28th Infantry Battalion (Nakhon Sawan)
    - 29th Infantry Battalion (Phitsanuloke)
    - 30th Infantry Battalion (Lampang)
    - 31st Infantry Battalion (Chiang Mai)
- 5th Army Circle (Nakhon Si Thammarat), which consisted of
  - 5th Infantry Battalion (Hat Yai – Songkhla)
  - 38th Infantry Battalion (Chumporn)
  - 39th Infantry Battalion (Nakhon Si Thammarat)
  - 42nd Infantry Battalion (Khok Pho – Pattani)

== Air Force ==
- Royal Thai Air Force commander – Air Marshal Luang Atuegtevadej
- Deputy Royal Thai Air Force commander – Air Vice Marshal Luang Tevaritpanluek
- Chief of Staff of the Royal Thai Air Force and the Phayap Army's commander of the Wings Mixed – Air Vice Marshal Fuen Ronnaphagrad Ritthakhanee

90th Combined Wing – unknown number

- 41st Squadron
  - Curtiss Hawk III
- 42nd Squadron
  - Curtiss Hawk III
- 32nd Squadron
  - Vought Corsair V-93s
- 11th Squadron
  - Mitsubishi Ki-30
- 12th Squadron
  - 17 Mitsubishi Ki-30
- 61st Squadron
  - Martin 139WS
- 62nd Squadron
  - Mitsubishi Ki-21-I

== See also ==
- Japanese conquest of Burma
- Thailand in World War II
- Saharat Thai Doem

== Sources ==
- Thailand
- The Northern Campaign
  - Phayap Army
- สงครามมหาเอเซียบูรพา – จากวันวีรไทย ถึง วันประกาศสงคราม (Thai)
- ประวัติศาสตร์การสงครามของไทยในสงครามมหาเอเซียบูรพา, กรมยุทธศึกษาทหาร กองบัญชาการทหารสูงสุด. 2540 (Thai)
- กองทัพไทยจัดกําลังพลไปรบในสงครามมหาเอเชียบูรพา
- ลุยโคลนไปยึดเชียงตุง สถาปนาเป็น “สหรัฐไทยเดิม”! ชิงดินแดนที่เสียไปในสมัย ร.๔-ร.๕ คืนมาได้ครบ!!
- ภาพเก่าเล่าตำนาน : กองทัพญี่ปุ่นไปทำอะไร...ใน‘ลำปาง’ โดย พลเอก นิพัทธ์ ทองเล็ก
- การจัดตั้งกองทัพพายัพ
- การปฏิบัติการของกองทัพพายัพ
