= Varananda Dhavaj =

Thai prince (1922–1990)

Varananda Dhavaj; วรานนท์ธวัช
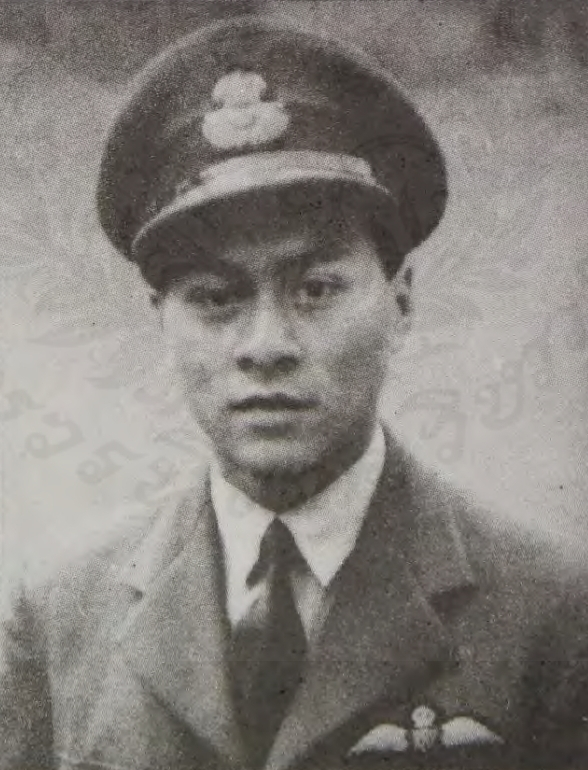
- Prince Varananda Dhavaj in 1943
- Born: Varananda Dhavaj Chudadhuj; 19 August 1922; Bangkok, Siam
- Died: 15 September 1990 (aged 68); Bangkok, Thailand
- Spouses: Pamela Smee (m. 1950); Galyani Vadhana (m. 1969); Kokeaw Prakaykavil na Chiengmai; Srisalai Suchatwut
- Issue: Dilok Nicholas Chudadhuj; Dara Jane Chudadhuj
- House: Chudadhut
- Dynasty: Chakri
- Father: Chudadhuj Dharadilok
- Mother: Ravi Kayananda
- Religion: Theravada Buddhism

Varananda Dhavaj (Thai: พระวรวงศ์เธอ พระองค์เจ้าวรานนท์ธวัช; RTGS: Waranonthawat), born Varananda Dhavaj Chudadhuj (Thai: วรานนท์ธวัช จุฑาธุช; RTGS: Waranonthawat Chuthathut; 19 August 1922 – 15 September 1990), was the son of Prince Chudadhuj Dharadilok and Mom Ravi Kayananda and grandson of King Chulalongkorn of Thailand. Although he was the only son of a senior Thai prince, he was disqualified from succession to the throne because his mother was not Prince Chudadhut's formal wife.

Following the death of his father, the prince was raised by his uncle King Prajadhipok. He joined the monarch in virtual exile in England. He enlisted in the RAF on February 24, 1942 under the name Nicky Varanand, was commissioned in 1943, and served as pilot in the Normandy campaign during World War II. He remained in the RAF, finally retiring as a flight lieutenant in 1960 to fly commercial aircraft for Thai Airways International. He later created his own airline, Air Siam, which went bankrupt in 1977. In 1973, he also became an adviser to the Ministry of Agriculture.

== Marriage and family ==
He married Mom Pamela Smee on June 10, 1950. Two children were born from this union:

- Mom Rajawongse Dilok Nicholas Chudadhuj (1953), Married with Jane Bishop and Chulalaxana Chudadhuj.
- Mom Rajawongse Dara Jane Chudadhuj (1956)

On September 24, 1969, he married his cousin, Princess Galyani Vadhana, King Bhumibol's eldest sister. He also had two concubines, Princess Kokeaw Prakaykavil na Chiengmai and Srisalai Suchatwut.

== Issue ==
| Name | Birth | Marriage | | Their children |
| Name | Birth | Date | Spouse | Their children |
|---|---|---|---|---|
| Mom Rajawongse Dilok Chudadhuj | 14 January 1953 (age 73) | Divorced | Jane Bishop | Mom Luang Dilok Chudadhuj |
| Mom Rajawongse Dilok Chudadhuj | 14 January 1953 (age 73) | Divorced | Jane Bishop | Mom Luang Catherine Chudadhuj |
| Mom Rajawongse Dilok Chudadhuj | 14 January 1953 (age 73) | | Anuri Chareonwong | None |
| Mom Rajawongse Dara Chudadhuj | | | | |
