= List of Thai royal residences =

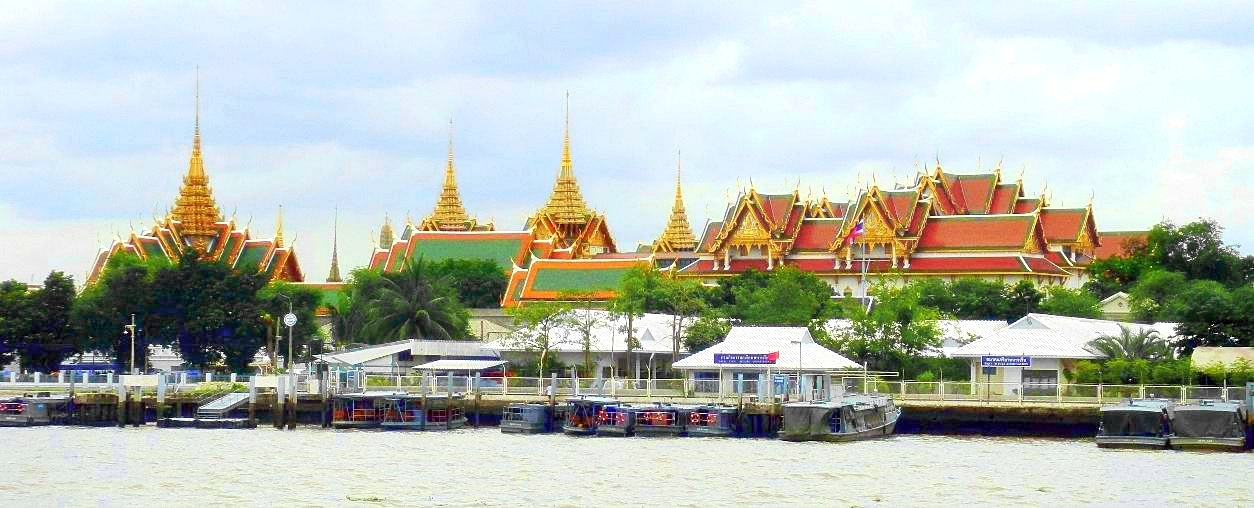
The Grand Palace compound on the banks of the Chao Phraya river. The primary royal and ceremonial residence of the monarch and royal family of Thailand.

Royal residences of the Chakri Dynasty in Thailand include the Grand Palace, nineteen royal palaces (Thai: พระราชวัง, RTGS: phra ratcha wang; official residences of the king and uparaja stipulated as such by royal decree) and other palaces (วัง, wang) used by the king or other members of the royal family. The Bureau of the Royal Household administers and manages several current royal palaces. Historical palaces from earlier periods exist mainly in the ruins of Ayutthaya and Sukhothai. This page lists current and former royal residences, arranged by type of residence.

== Current royal residences ==
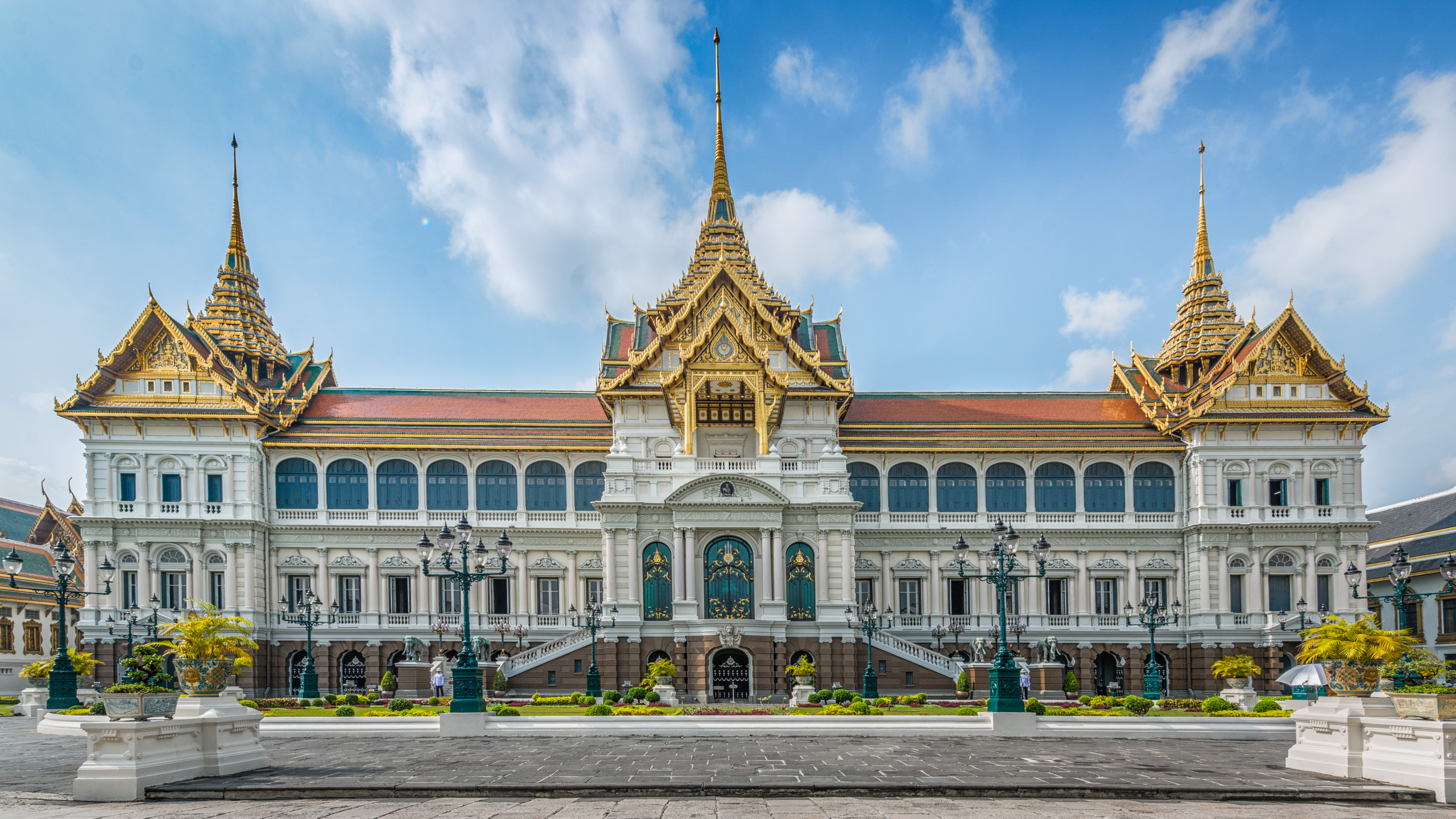
The Chakri Mahaprasat Throne Hall inside the Grand Palace.

Grand Palace
Bangkok – The primary and official ceremonial residence of the king, also the location of the chapel royal the Wat Phra Kaew.

=== Royal palaces ===
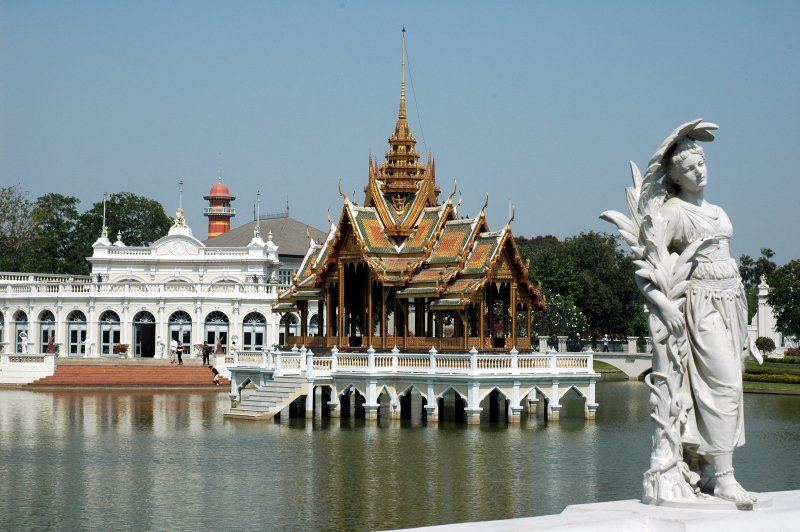
The Bang Pa-in Palace at Ayutthaya.

Bang Pa-In Royal Palace
Ayutthaya (17th century, rebuilt 1872–89) – Occasional country residence of the king; generally open to the public.

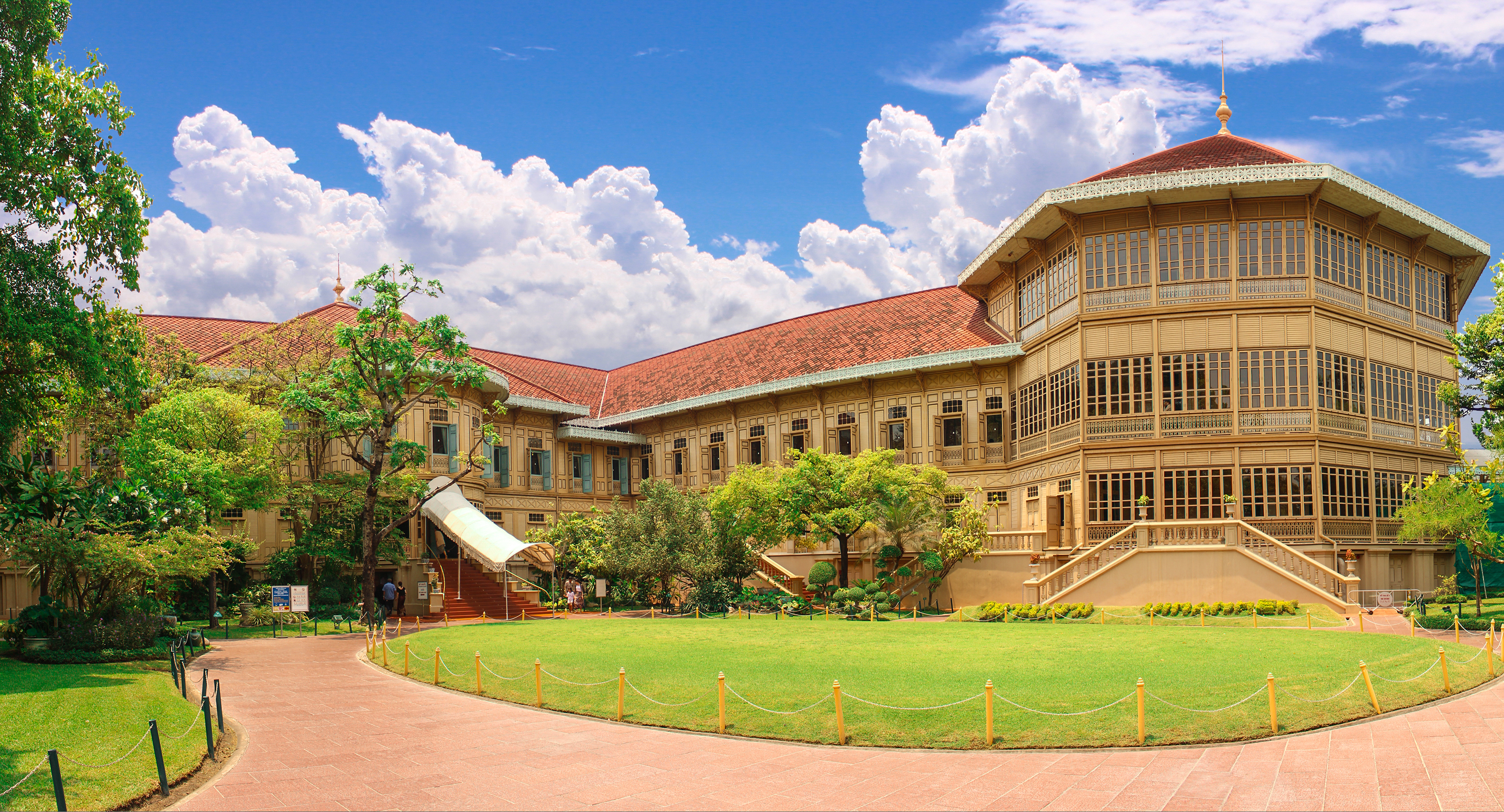
The Vimanmek Mansion inside the Dusit Palace.

Dusit Palace
Bangkok (1897–1901) – Commissioned by King Chulalongkorn as the primary residence to the Grand Palace.
- Vimanmek Mansion (1903) – Oldest residential building of the Dusit Palace complex; now serves as a museum.
- Abhisek Dusit Throne Hall (1904) – Built as a banqueting and festivities space, now houses the Thai Handicrafts Museum.
- Amphorn Sathan Residential Hall (1906) – Main residential building of the Dusit Palace complex, currently the residence of King Maha Vajiralongkorn.
- Ananta Samakhom Throne Hall (1908) – Built as an audience chamber and throne hall. Served as the seat of the Parliament of Thailand from 1932–1974.
- Chitralada Royal Villa (1913) – The primary residence of King Bhumibol Adulyadej from 1957–2016, and home to Queen Sirikit before her death in 2025.

=== Palaces ===
Sa Pathum Palace
Bangkok (1916) – Currently the residence of Princess Royal Sirindhorn.
Sukhothai Palace
Bangkok (1918) – residence of King Vajiralongkorn while Crown Prince, former home of King Prajadhipok, Queen Rambai Barni and Princess Bajrakitiyabha. Currently the residence of Princess Sirivannavari.
Klai Kangwon Palace
Prachuap Khiri Khan (1926) – Commissioned by King Prajadhipok; served as the primary summer residence for the late King Bhumibol Adulyadej.
Ruen Rudee Palace
Bangkok (1957) – Former residence of the late Princess Bejaratana.
Bhubing Palace
Chiang Mai (1962) – Winter residence of the king; open to the public when the royal family is not in residence.
Thaksin Ratchaniwet Palace
Narathiwat (1972) – Southern country residence of the king.
Phu Phan Palace
Sakon Nakhon (1975) – Northeastern country residence of the king.
Chakri Bongkot Palace
Pathum Thani (1982) – Residence of Princess Chulabhorn.
Doi Tung Royal Villa
Chiang Rai (1987) – Former residence of the late Princess Mother Srinagarindra.
Le Dix Palace
Bangkok (1980) – Former residence of the late Princess Galyani Vadhana.
Khao Kho Royal palace
Phetchabun (1985) – Former temporarily residence of the late King Bhumibol Adulyadej.

== Former royal residences of the Rattanakosin period ==
=== Royal palaces ===
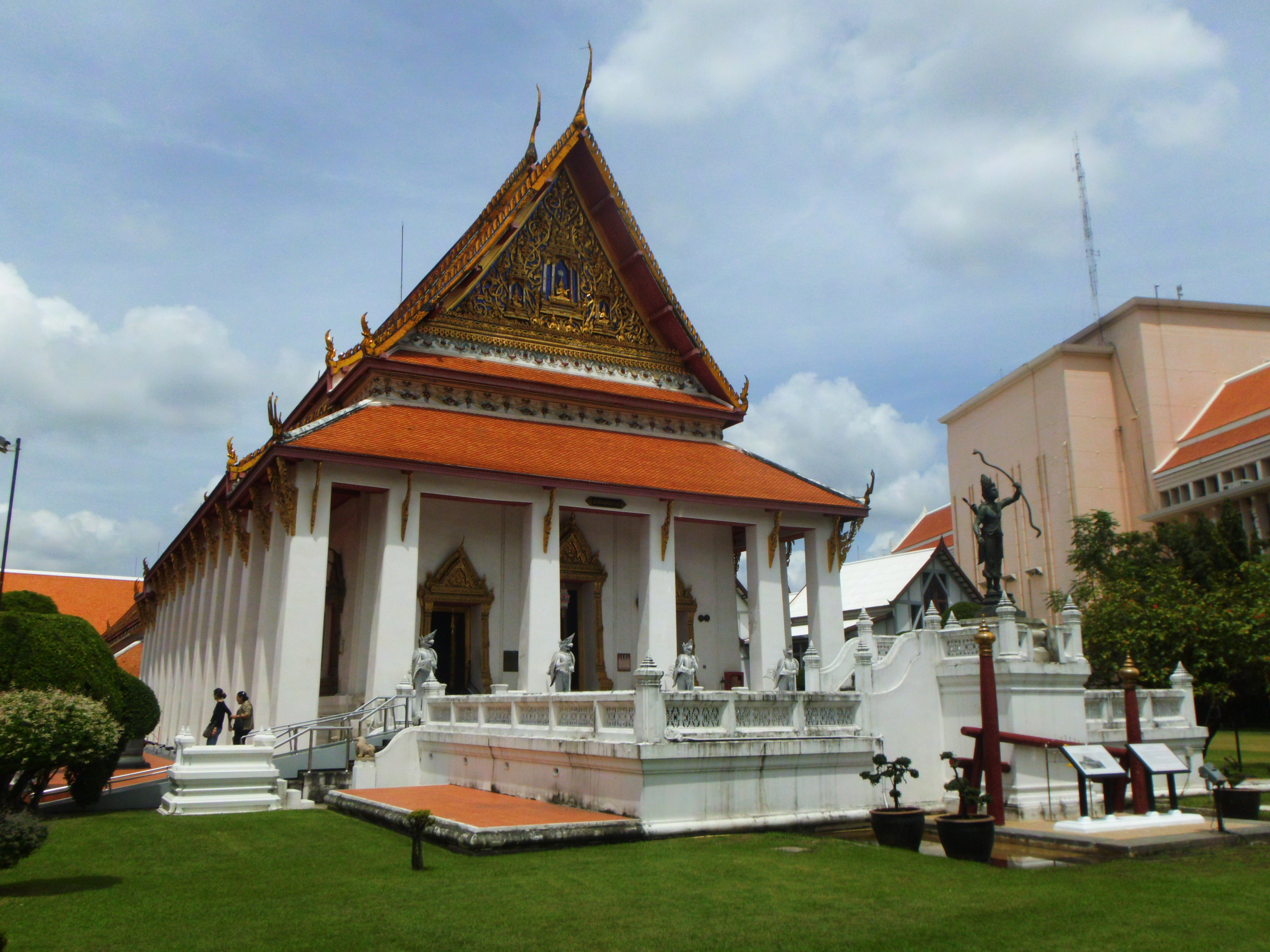
The Phutthaisawan Hall of the former Front Palace.

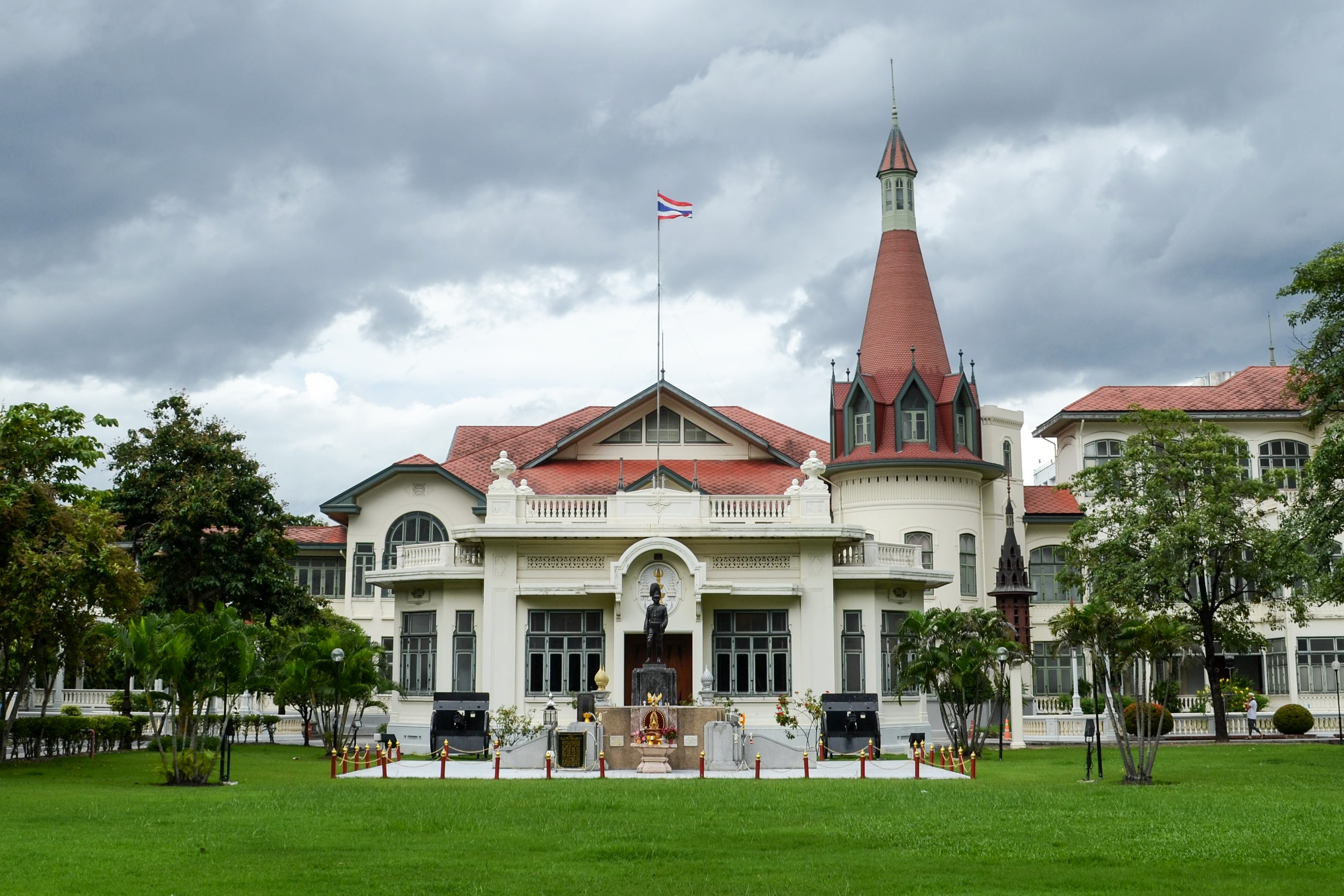
Phaya Thai Palace, formerly the country residence of King Chulalongkorn.

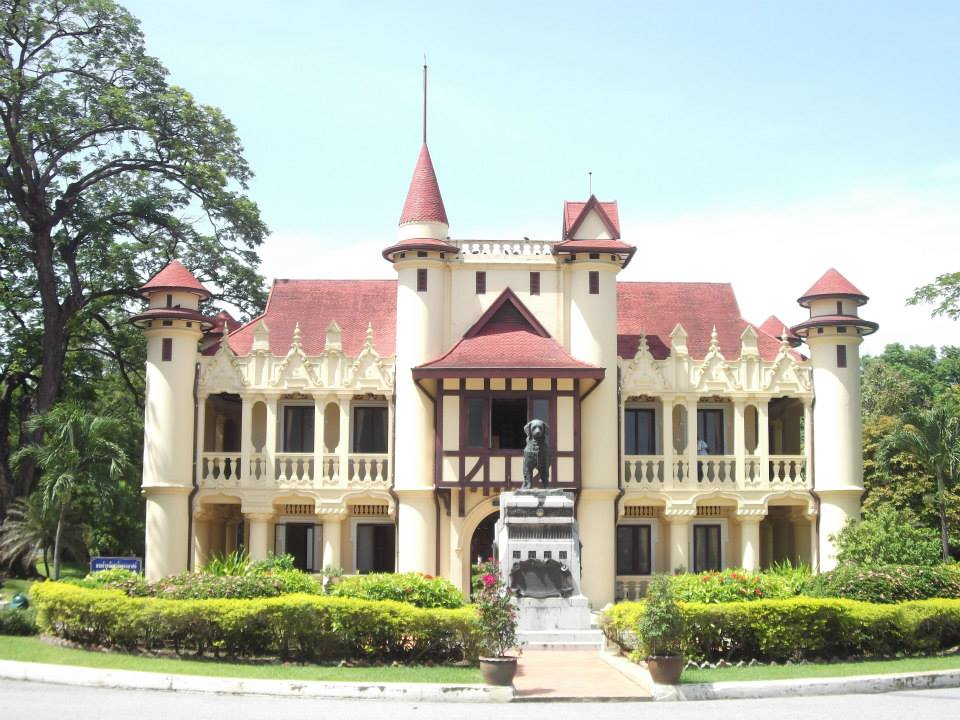
Sanam Chandra Palace, formerly country residence of King Vajiravudh.

Front Palace (Bangkok) (Phra Ratchawang Bowon Sathan Mongkhon)
Bangkok (1782–85) – Residence of the holder of the same title, who was also known as the uparaja or "vice king". Its grounds are now the site of the Bangkok National Museum, Thammasat University, Bunditpatanasilpa Institute, the National Theatre and the Office of the Council of State.
Rear Palace (Phra Ratchawang Bowon Sathan Phimuk)
Bangkok (built in the reign of King Rama I) – Residence of the "Rear Palace" or second vice king. It is now the site of Siriraj Hospital.
Nantha Utthayan Palace
Bangkok – Built in the reign of King Mongkut, its location is now occupied by the Royal Thai Navy.
Pathum Wan Palace (later known as Phetchabun Palace)
Bangkok – Built in the reign of King Mongkut as a country residence; later given to Prince Chudadhuj Dharadilok. Its location is now the site of CentralWorld.
Saranrom Palace
Bangkok (construction began 1866) – Served as temporary residence for some princes and as lodging for royal guests. It is now the site of the Museum of the Ministry of Foreign Affairs and Saranrom Park.
Samut Prakan Palace
Samut Prakan (built in the reign of King Mongkut) – Was located opposite to Samut Prakan Station of the Paknam Railway; now demolished.
Chan Kasem Royal Palace
Ayutthaya (16th century) – The front palace of Ayutthaya, destroyed and abandoned following the Fall of Ayutthaya. Rebuilt and served as country residence for King Mongkut's travels to Ayutthaya; superseded by Bang Pa-in Palace and is now the site of Chan Kasem National Museum.
Thak Phikun Palace
Saraburi (17th century, rebuilt in the reign of King Mongkut) – Served as residence during royal pilgrimages to the Buddha footprint at Phra Phutthabat. Now abandoned.
Phra Nakhon Khiri Palace
Phetchaburi (1859) – Served as country residence during the reigns of Kings Mongkut and Chulalongkorn; now the Phra Nakhon Khiri historical park.
Si Tha Palace
Saraburi (built in the reign of King Mongkut) – Royal residence of Pinklao, the second king; now abandoned.
Phaya Thai Palace
Bangkok (1909) – Served as country residence of King Chulalongkorn and Queen Saovabha Phongsri, and later King Vajiravudh. Converted to a hotel, then a hospital; now within the grounds of Phramongkutklao Hospital and College of Medicine.
Sanam Chandra Palace
Nakhon Pathom (1902–11) – Country residence of King Vajiravudh. Later became a campus of Silpakorn University; now a museum.
Phra Chuthathut Palace (Phra Chuthathut Ratchathan)
Chonburi – Served as a summer residence during the reign of King Chulalongkorn; now a research centre and museum of Chulalongkorn University.
Royal palace at Khao Sattanat
Ratchaburi (1870) – Served as a country residence for King Chulalongkorn; now the site of Wat Khao Wang, a Buddhist temple.
Royal palace on Mae Klong River
Ratchaburi – Commissioned by King Chulalongkorn but converted to a barracks (and later a police station) before completion.
Rattanarangsan Palace
Ranong (1890) – Built for King Chulalongkorn by Khaw Su Jiang, a local noble merchant; now the site of the town hall and a museum commemorating the palace.
Phra Ram Ratchaniwet (Ban Puen Palace)
Phetchaburi (1910) – Commissioned by King Chulalongkorn as a country residence; now a museum operated by the Royal Thai Army.

=== Palaces ===
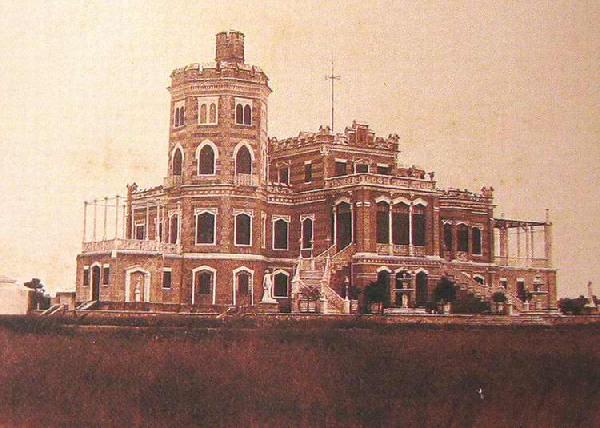
The since demolished Windsor Palace.

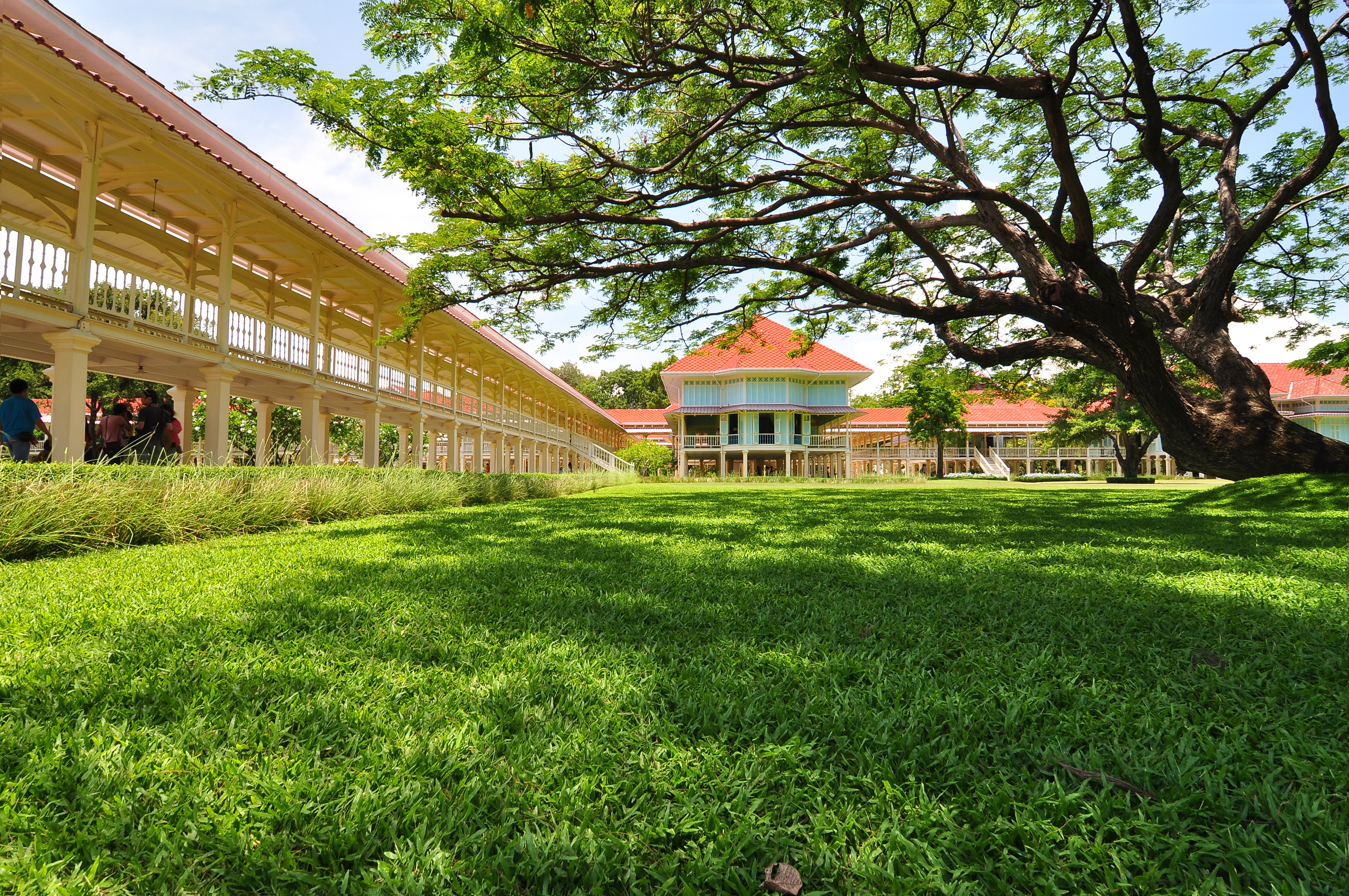
The Mrigadayavan Palace, built by King Vajiravudh as a seaside retreat.

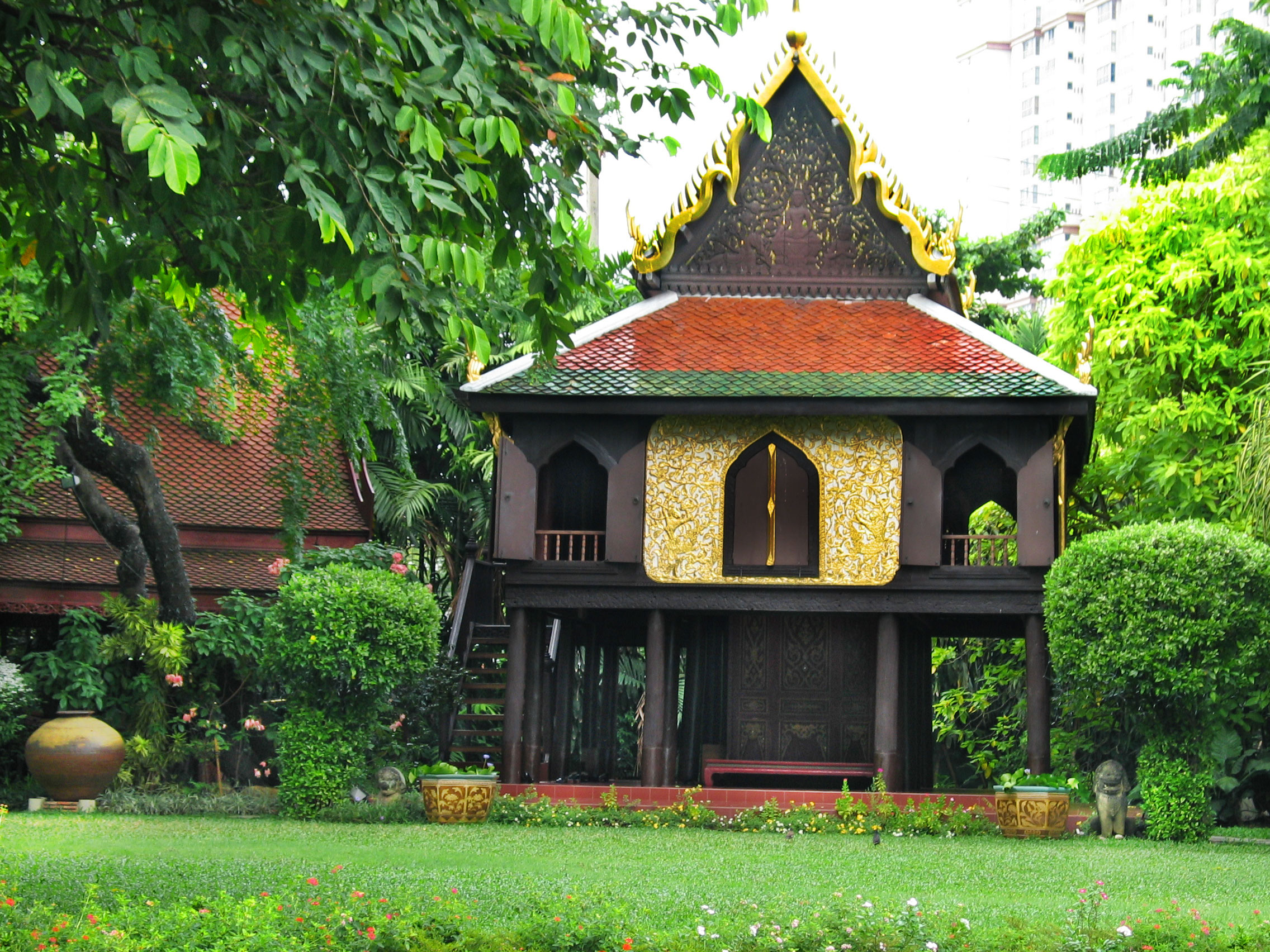
The Suan Pakkad Palace princely home of Prince Chumbhotbongs Paribatra.

Tha Phra Palace
Bangkok (1782) – Served as the residence of Prince Chetsadabodin (Rama III) and Prince Narisara Nuvadtivongs, among others; now the main campus of Silpakorn University.
Buraphaphirom Palace
Bangkok – Rebuilt in 1875 to serve as the residence of Prince Bhanurangsi Savangwongse, the palace has since been demolished, and its former grounds are now a commercial area known as Wang Burapha.
Dara Phirom Palace
Chiang Mai – Residence of Princess Dara Rasmi after the death of King Chulalongkorn; now a museum managed by Chulalongkorn University
Windsor Palace
Bangkok – Built in the reign of King Chulalongkorn to serve as the residence of Crown Prince Vajirunhis. The palace became part of Chulalongkorn University after the prince's death; its former location is now the site of the National Stadium.
Bang Khun Phrom Palace
Bangkok (1899) – Former residence of Prince Paribatra Sukhumbandhu; now the Bank of Thailand Museum.
Suan Sunandha Palace (Sunandha Garden)
Bangkok – Formerly part of Dusit Palace; now the campus of Suan Sunandha Rajabhat University.
Paruskavan Palace
Bangkok (1904–05) – Former residence of Prince Chakrabongse Bhuvanath; now the headquarters of the Metropolitan Police Bureau and the National Intelligence Agency.
Ladawan Palace
Bangkok (1906) – Former residence of Prince Yugala Dighambara; now the site of the Crown Property Bureau.
Thewet Palace
Bangkok – Residence of Prince Kitiyakara Voralaksana and his descendants.
Chakrabongse Palace
Bangkok (1909–1910) – former residence of Prince Chakrabongse Bhuvanath; now the site of Chakrabongse Villas, a private resort, and the headquarters of Green World Foundation and River Books.
Chan Kasem Palace
Bangkok (1909–11) – Built as the residence of then-Crown Prince Vajiravudh, the prince succeeded his father before the palace's completion. It is now the site of the Ministry of Education.
Varadis Palace
Bangkok (1911) – Former residence of Prince Damrong Rajanubhab; now a museum.
Plai Nern Palace
Bangkok (1914) – Former residence of Prince Narisara Nuvadtivongs; now a museum.
Thewawet Palace
Bangkok (1914) – Former residence of Prince Devawongse Varopakarn; now a museum of the Bank of Thailand.
Mrigadayavan Palace
Phetchaburi (1923–24) – Summer residence of King Vajiravudh; Now owned by the Border Patrol Police and open to the public.
Suan Pakkad Palace
Bangkok (1952) – Former residence of Prince Chumbhotbongs Paribatra; now a museum.

== Historical (pre-Rattanakosin) royal palaces ==
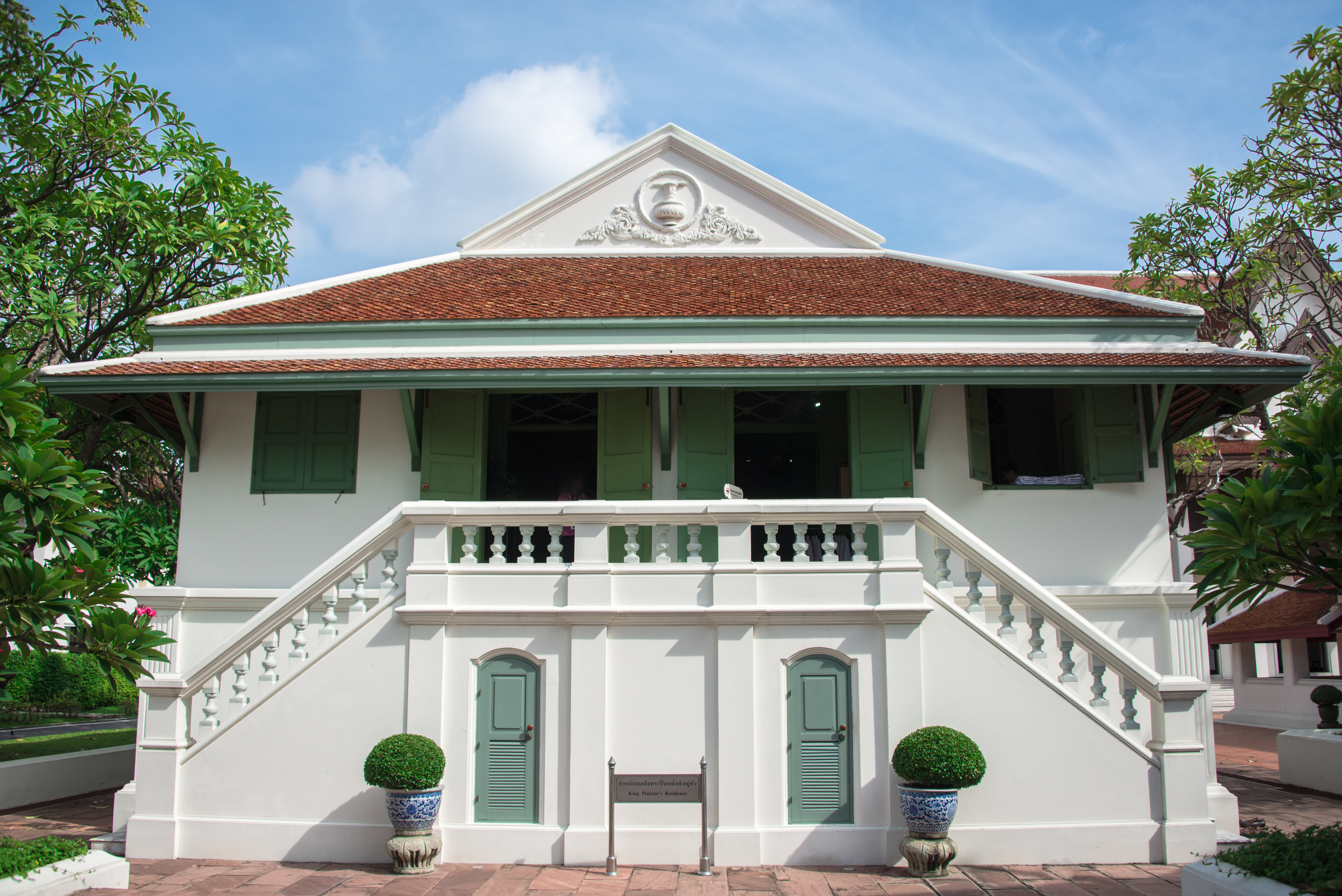
Phra Racha Wang Derm, formerly the palace of King Taksin of Thonburi.

Royal Palace of Sukhothai (13th – 15th centuries)
Sukhothai – Now part of Sukhothai Historical Park
Royal Palace of Ayutthaya (14th – 18th centuries)
Ayutthaya – Now part of Ayutthaya Historical Park
Front Palace of Ayutthaya
Currently houses the Chan Kasem National Museum
Rear Palace of Ayutthaya
Largely destroyed
Chan Palace
Phitsanulok (15th century)
King Narai's Palace (Phra Narai Ratchaniwet)
Lopburi (1666) – Now a museum
Phra Racha Wang Derm (Thonburi Palace)
Bangkok (1768) – Royal palace of King Taksin and Rama II (as a prince); now site of the Royal Thai Navy headquarters.
