= Ladawan Palace =

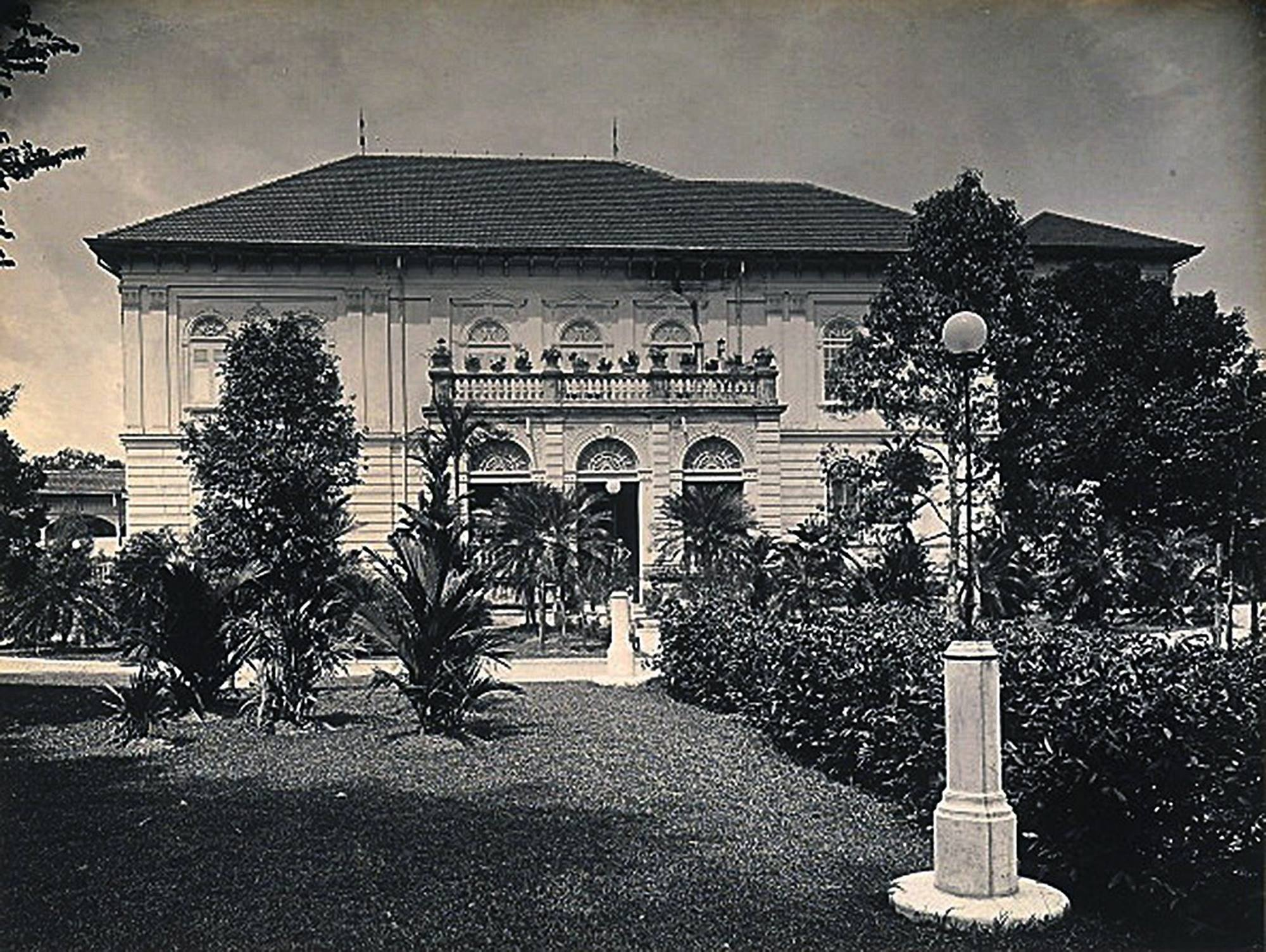
Ladawan Palace in the past

Ladawan Palace (Thai: วังลดาวัลย์, RTGS: Wang Ladawan, pronounced [wáŋ lá.daː.wan]) is a former royal residence located in Bangkok, Thailand. It is surrounded by Nakhon Ratchasima Road, Phitsanulok Road, and Luk Luang Road, with the Luk Luang side adjacent to the Khlong Phadung Krung Kasem.

The palace was built during the reign of King Chulalongkorn (Rama V) as the residence of Prince Yugala Dighambara, the 44th son of King Rama V and Princess Saisavali Bhiromya, and the progenitor of the Yukol royal family line.

== History ==
Ladawan Palace was constructed in 1906, designed by Italian architect G. Bruno, with a construction budget of 218,000 baht under a lump-sum contract. The work took a total of 18 months and was completed in 1908.

The palace is a large masonry structure. Its doors and windows are arched, with fanlights above. The exterior walls are painted yellow, and the windows are fitted with ventilation openings resembling portholes on a large ship. The interior architectural decoration incorporates a mixture of artistic influences from both Europe and China.

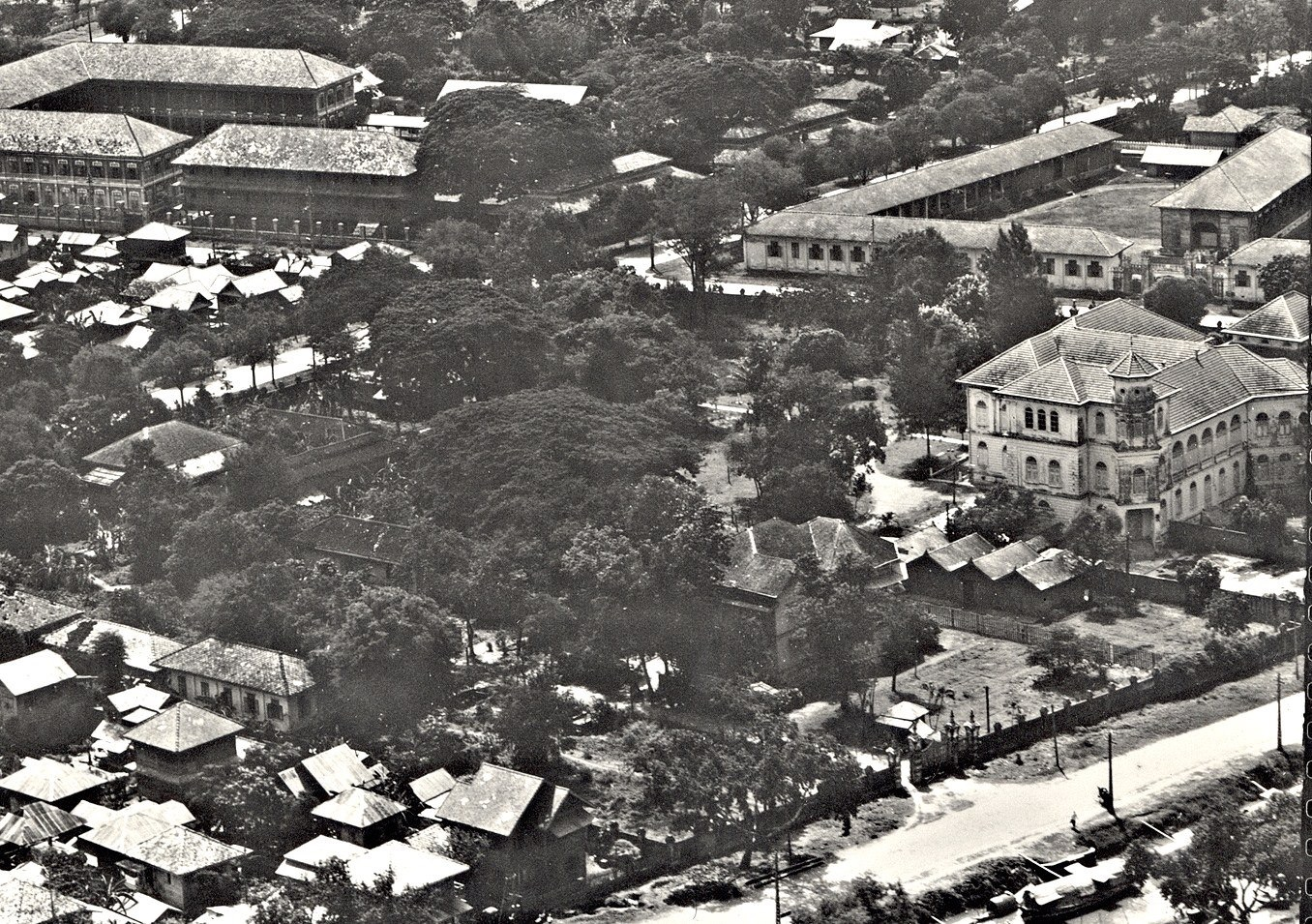
Aerial view of the palace

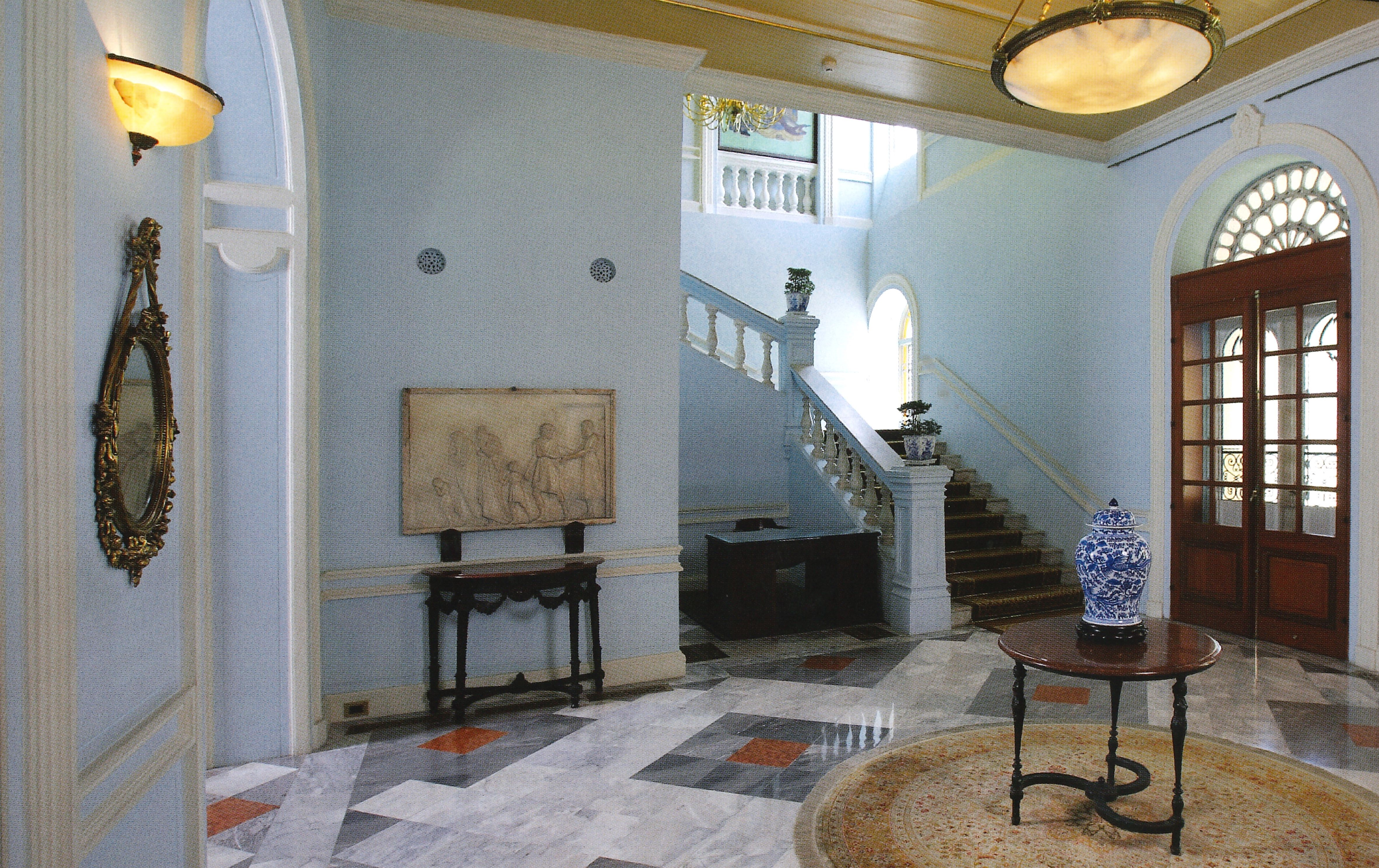
Main hall

The palace was granted the name Ladawan after Prince Ladawan, the maternal grandfather of Prince Yugala Dighambara. Prince Ladawan, the 15th son of King Nangklao (Rama III), was highly skilled as a master builder and construction supervisor. It is also commonly known as "Wang Daeng" (วังแดง, pronounced [/wáŋ dɛ̌ːŋ]), which means "Red Mansion," named after the red-coloured walls surrounding the palace since its initial construction. This name eventually became the designation of the entire neighbourhood where the palace is located, an area near the Teachers' Council of Thailand and the Wisukam Narueman Bridge. Moreover, Wang Daeng is also used to refer to the intersection where Phitsanulok Road meets Nakhon Ratchasima Road. 13°46′05.97″N 100°30′27.46″E

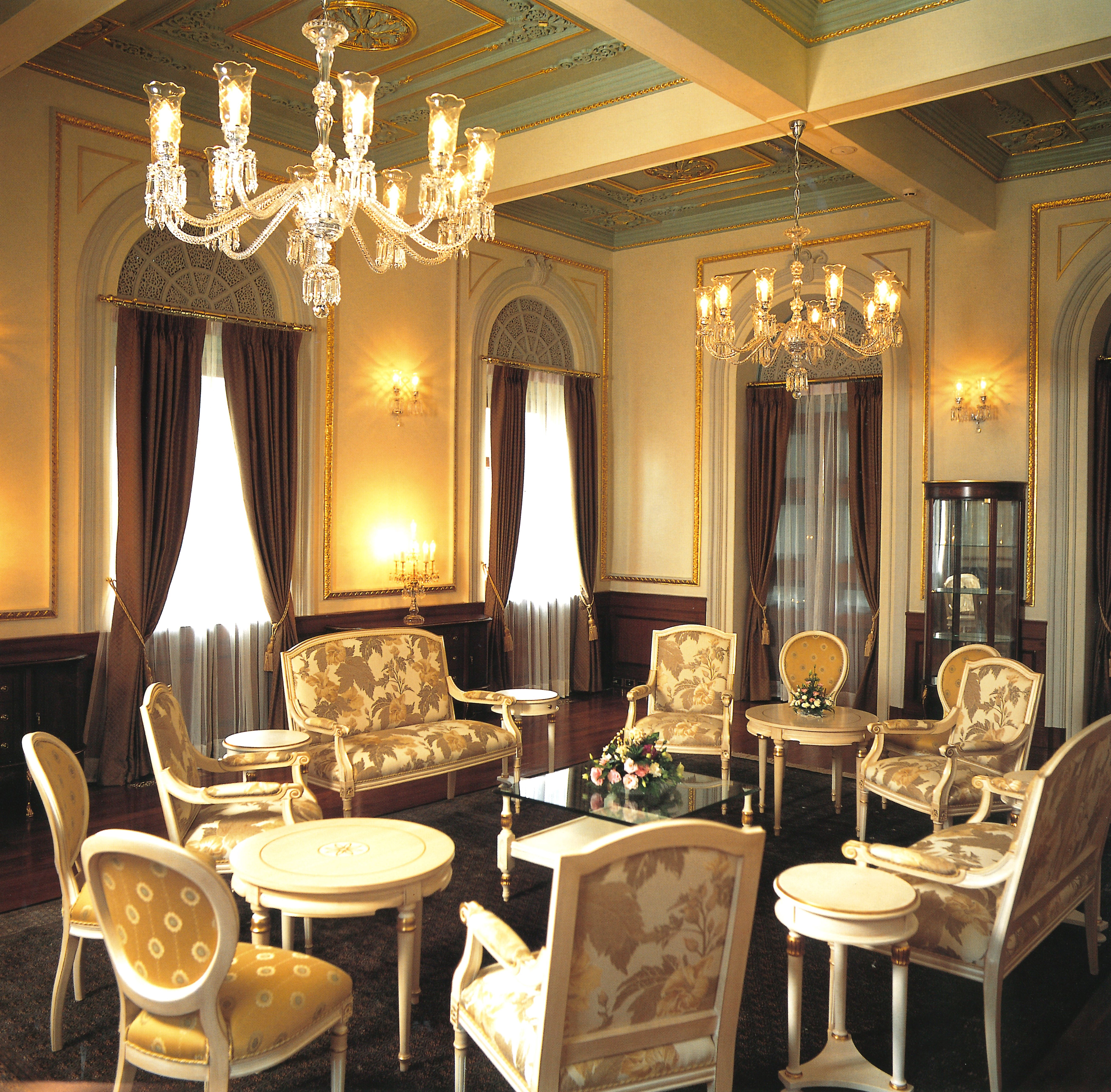
Reception room

Since Prince Yugala Dighambara and his consort, Princess Chalermkhetra Mangala (née Bhanubandh), were both passionate about the performing arts, particularly music and dance, Ladawan Palace became a cultural hub that fostered numerous Thai musicians. Many of these artists later rose to prominence as master performers. The musicians associated with Ladawan Palace had previously been affiliated with Buraphaphirom Palace before establishing their reputation here.

The couple's descendants, namely Prince Bhanubandhu Yugala and Prince Anusorn Mongkolkarn, went on to become renowned film directors, with the former regarded as one of the pioneering figures in the history of Thai cinema. Prince Anusorn Mongkolkarn was the father of Prince Chatrichalerm Yukol, a prominent filmmaker in contemporary Thai cinema.

A major change occurred at Ladawan Palace in 1932, when Prince Yugala Dighambara died from heart disease. This event took place shortly before the 150th anniversary of Rattanakosin (Bangkok) during the reign of King Prajadhipok (Rama VII). The palace was subsequently sold, and Princess Chalermkhetra Mangala relocated to Mungklasatarn Palace on Sukhumvit Road, which today serves as the site of the Philippine Embassy.

In the final years of World War II, in 1945, the Crown Property Bureau (CPB) contacted the heirs of Ladawan Palace to purchase the property, in order to prevent it from falling into foreign hands. Since then, Ladawan Palace has been under the supervision of the CPB. Over time, the agency underwent name changes, becoming the Crown Property Bureau and later the Privy Purse Bureau (PPB). It has remained the office of the PPB to the present day. Ladawan Palace was received the ASA Architectural Conservation Award in 1982.

== See also ==
- List of Thai royal residences
- ASA Architectural Conservation Award
