= Dusit Palace =

Thai royal residence compound

Coordinates: 13.774°N 100.512°E

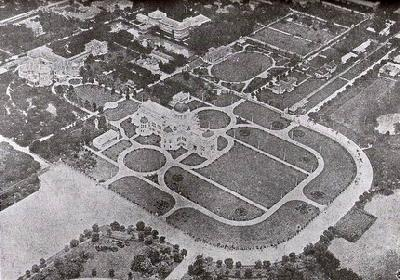
Aerial view of Dusit Palace, in the southern part of Dusit District, Bangkok

Dusit Palace (Thai: พระราชวังดุสิต, RTGS: Phra Ratcha Wang Dusit) is a compound of royal residences in Bangkok, Thailand. The palace was constructed over a large area north of Rattanakosin Island between 1897 and 1901 by King Chulalongkorn (Rama V). The palace, originally called Wang Suan Dusit or 'Dusit Garden Palace' (วังสวนดุสิต), eventually became the primary (but not official) place of residence of the King of Thailand, including King Chulalongkorn (Rama V), King Vajiravudh (Rama VI), King Prajadhipok (Rama VII), King Bhumibol Adulyadej (Rama IX) and King Vajiralongkorn (Rama X). The palace covers an area of over 64,749 square metres (696,950 sq ft) and is dotted between gardens and lawns with 13 different royal residences. Dusit Palace is bordered by Ratchwithi Road in the north, Sri Ayutthaya Road in the south, Ratchasima Road in the west and U-Thong Nai Road on the east.

== History ==
=== Background ===
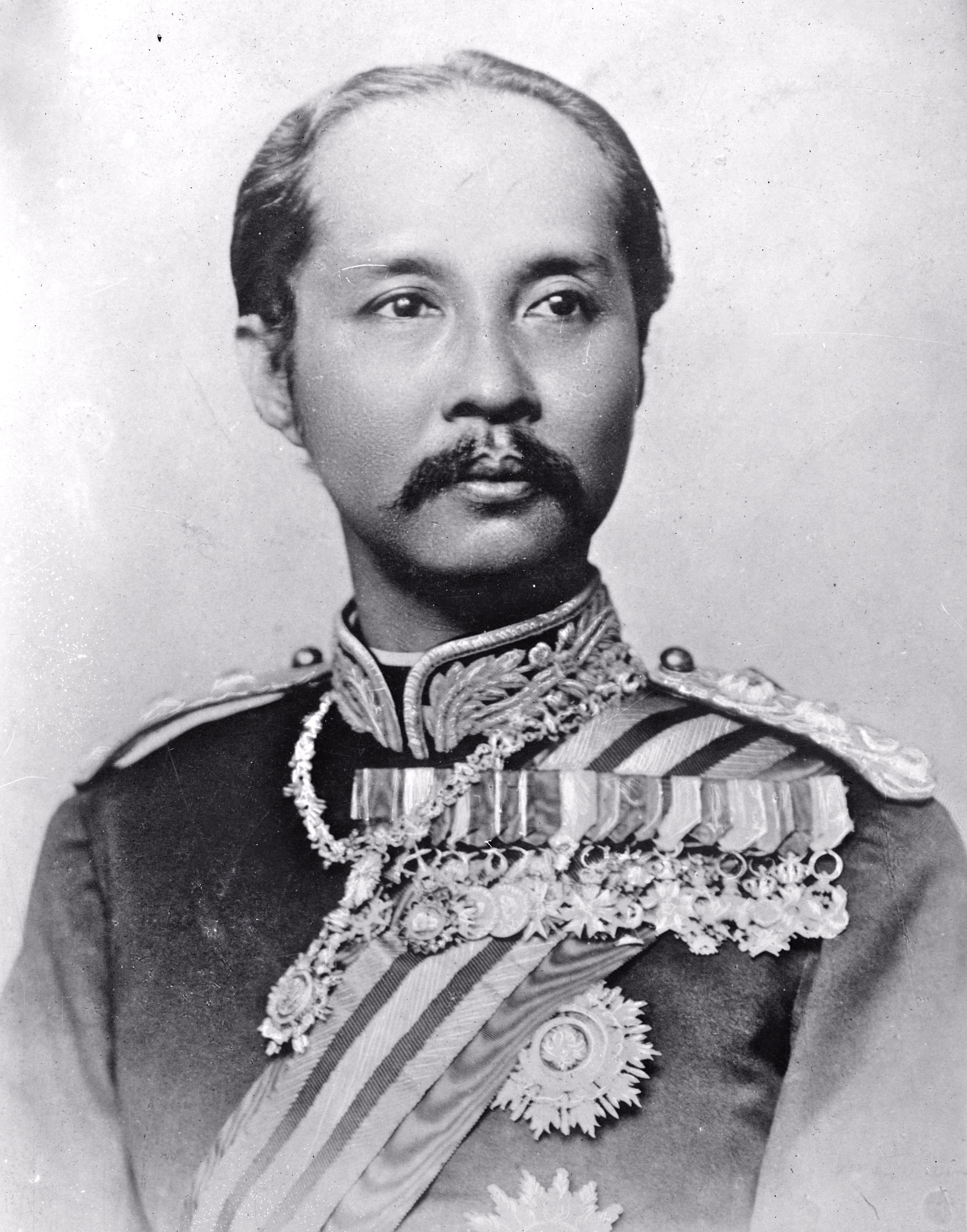
King Chulalongkorn (Rama V) found the Grand Palace too overcrowded and unhealthy, as a result he began construction on a new palace, which eventually became Dusit Palace.

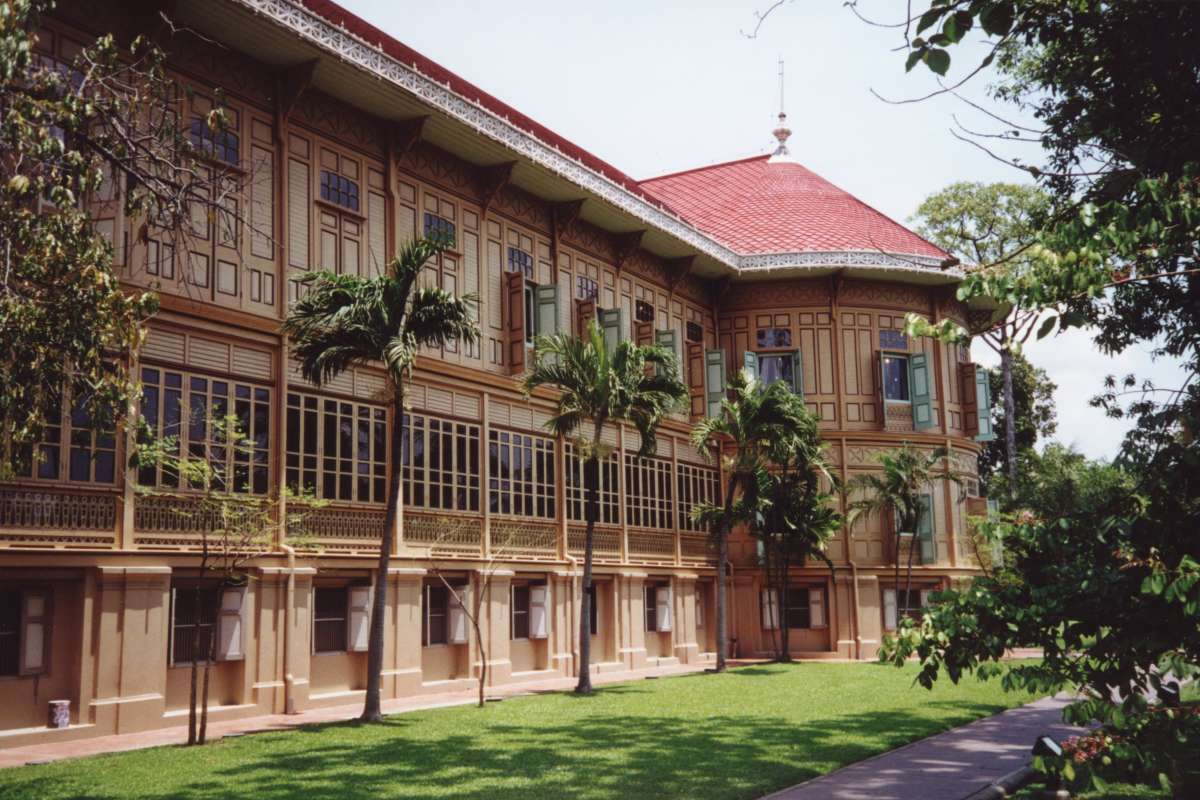
The Vimanmek Mansion, built in 1900, is entirely made of teak. It was built in Ko Sichang, Chonburi Province, but was dismantled on the orders of the king and reconstructed at Dusit Palace in 1901.

Since 1782 and the foundation of Bangkok as the capital city of the Kingdom of Siam, the monarchs of the Chakri dynasty have resided at the Grand Palace by the Chao Phraya River. The palace became the focal point of the city as well as a seat of the royal government and the home of the king and his court (his children and his polygamous household). During the reign of King Chulalongkorn, the Grand Palace was transformed, with reconstruction and additions made to the main Middle Court (state buildings) and the Inner Court (residential buildings) of the palace. The changes sought to modernize the palace as well as accommodate its growing population. As a result, the palace, particularly the Inner Court, became extremely overcrowded. The Grand Palace also became stiflingly hot during the summer months, with the passage of air blocked by the closely clustered new buildings. Epidemics, once started, were liable to spread easily within the crowded compound. The king, who enjoyed taking long walks for exercise and pleasure, often felt unwell after prolonged stays inside the Grand Palace. He consequently took frequent trips to the countryside to seek relief.

=== Celestial palace ===
Chulalongkorn got the idea of having a royal residence with spacious gardens on the outskirts of the capital from European monarchs during his trip to Europe in 1897. When he returned to Bangkok he began to build a new royal compound within walking distance of the Grand Palace. He began by acquiring farmlands and orchards between the Padung Krung Kasem and Samsen canals from Privy Purse funds. The king named this area Suan Dusit meaning 'celestial garden'. The first building in the area was a single story wooden structure, used by the king, his consorts, and his children for occasional stays. In 1890s, plans for a permanent set of residences were drawn up and construction began under the supervision of Prince Narisara Nuvadtivongs (the king's brother) and C. Sandreczki (a German architect, responsible for the Boromphiman Palace). Apart from the prince, all other members of the team were Europeans. When it became clear that Chulalongkorn preferred to stay in the garden, with only occasional visits to the Grand Palace for state and royal ceremonies, the name was changed to Wang Dusit meaning 'celestial dwelling'. The king also ordered the construction of Wat Benchamabophit nearby to serve as the palace's official temple.

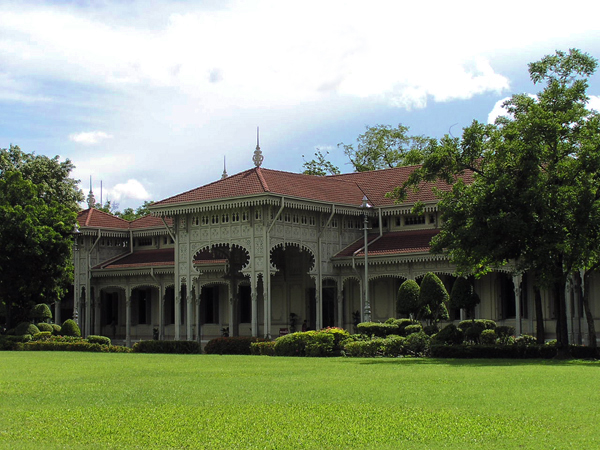
Abhisek Dusit Throne Hall was built in 1904 as an audience hall and entertainment venue for the Dusit Palace complex.

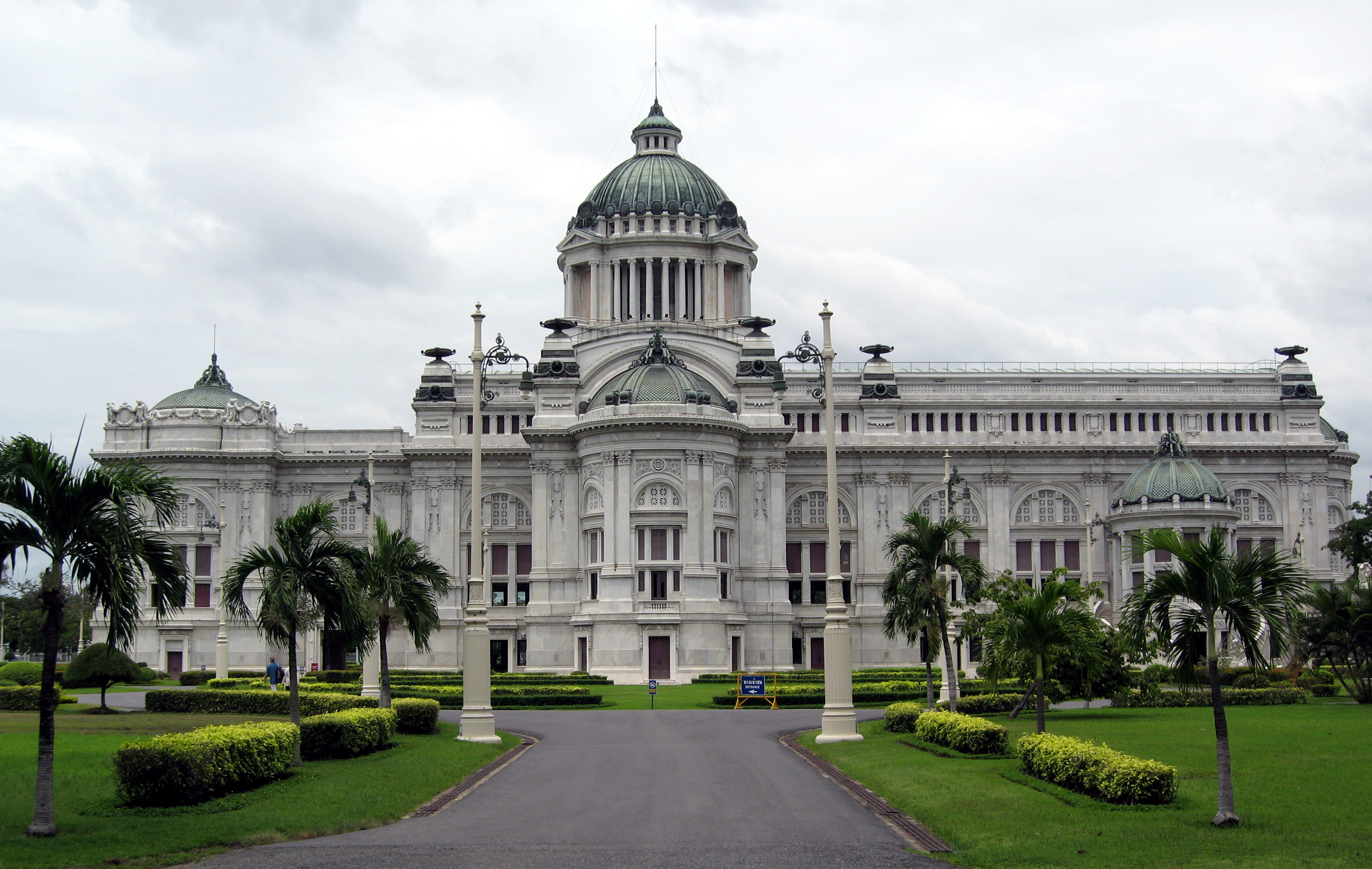
The north façade of the Ananta Samakhom Throne Hall, built in 1908 as an audience hall for the palace.

Apart from his long walks, Chulalongkorn also indulged in the new and fashionable pastime of cycling. Even before he took permanent residence at Dusit Palace, he would take his entourage cycling from the Grand Palace to the garden and back, with bicycling trips often taking all day. The pathway connecting the Grand Palace to Dusit Palace eventually became Ratchadamnoen Avenue. The construction of both Dusit Palace and Ratchadamnoen Avenue allowed and encouraged the expansion of Bangkok outside its city walls and the traditional confines of the Rattanakosin area. The palace expanded Bangkok northwards, while the avenue accommodated further growth. The avenue extended from the palace, starting in front of the Ananta Samakhom Throne Hall and the Royal Plaza southwards along the Makawan Rangsant and Phanfah Lielas Bridges, then westward across the Phanbipob Liela Bridge, then south again along the Sanam Luang to the Grand Palace.

On Chulalongkorn's return from his second European tour in 1908, he expanded the palace northward, creating an additional private garden called Suan Sunandha (สวนสุนันทา), in honour of his first consort Queen Sunandha Kumariratana, who died in 1880. The garden became the setting for residential houses belonging to the king's consorts and children. Chulalongkorn lived at the palace until his death at the Amphorn Sathan Residential Hall on 23 October 1910 of kidney disease.

=== Sixth, seventh and eighth reigns ===
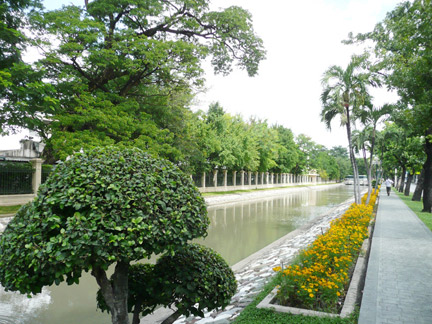
The moat of the Chitralada Royal Villa. The villa was built in 1913 and was incorporated as part of Dusit Palace in 1925. It was the primary residence of King Bhumibol Adulyadej and Queen Sirikit.

Chulalongkorn's successor, King Vajiravudh, contributed to the expansion of the palace by the construction in 1913 of another garden called Suan Chitralada (สวนจิตรลดา), between Dusit Palace and Phaya Thai Palace. In this garden he had a residential villa built and named it Phra Thamnak Chitralada Rahothan or the Chitralada Royal Villa (พระตำหนักจิตรลดารโหฐาน). Later, in 1925, during the reign of King Prajadhipok, this garden was incorporated by royal command as part of Dusit Palace. At its greatest extent the palace occupied over 768,902 square metres (8,276,390 sq ft) of land. In 1932 the absolute monarchy was abolished and part of the Dusit Palace was reduced and transferred to the constitutional government. This included the Khao Din Wana (เขาดินวนา) to the east of the palace, which was given in 1938 to the Bangkok City Municipality by King Ananda Mahidol to create a public park, which later became Dusit Zoo. The Ananta Samakhom Throne Hall was also appropriated as the permanent meeting place of the National Assembly of Thailand.

=== Ninth reign ===
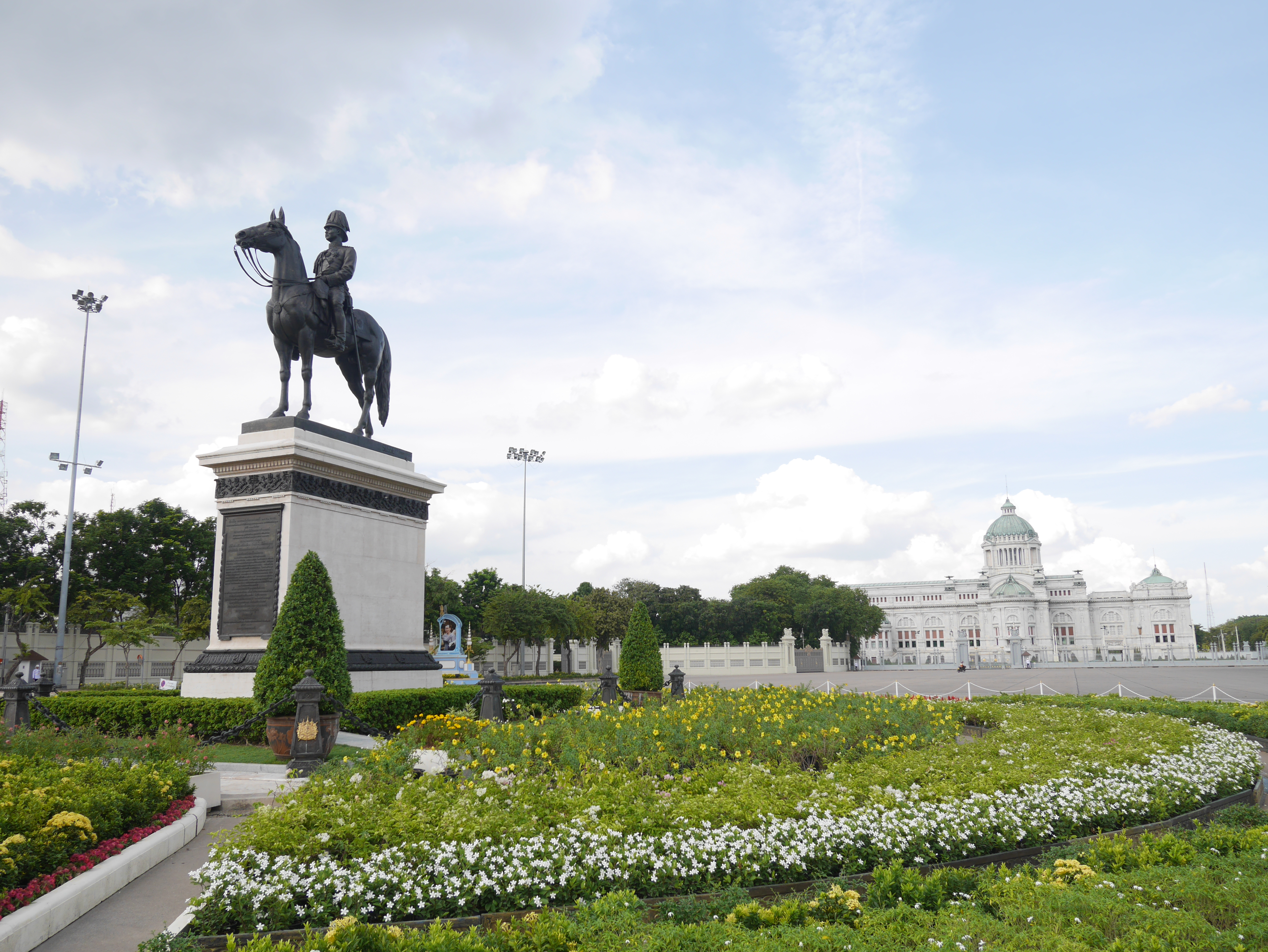
Royal Plaza at Dusit Palace

When King Bhumibol Adulyadej returned from his studies to Thailand in 1952 he made the Chitralada Royal Villa his main residence and had it renovated. In the meantime, the king and his growing family stayed at the Amphorn Sathan Residential Hall, part of Dusit Palace. After renovations were completed, the king made the royal villa his permanent residence. The area of the royal villa and garden is commonly referred to as "Chitralada Palace".

In 1970, the National Assembly of Thailand requested a new plot of land for the building of a new legislature, as the Ananta Samkhom Throne Hall had become too small and was unable to accommodate the growing assembly and its secretariat. The king granted a plot of land on Dusit Palace grounds immediately north of the Throne Hall for the building of a new Parliament House of Thailand. With the completion of this new building the Ananta Samkhom Throne Hall was returned to the king as part of the palace once more.

=== Tenth reign ===
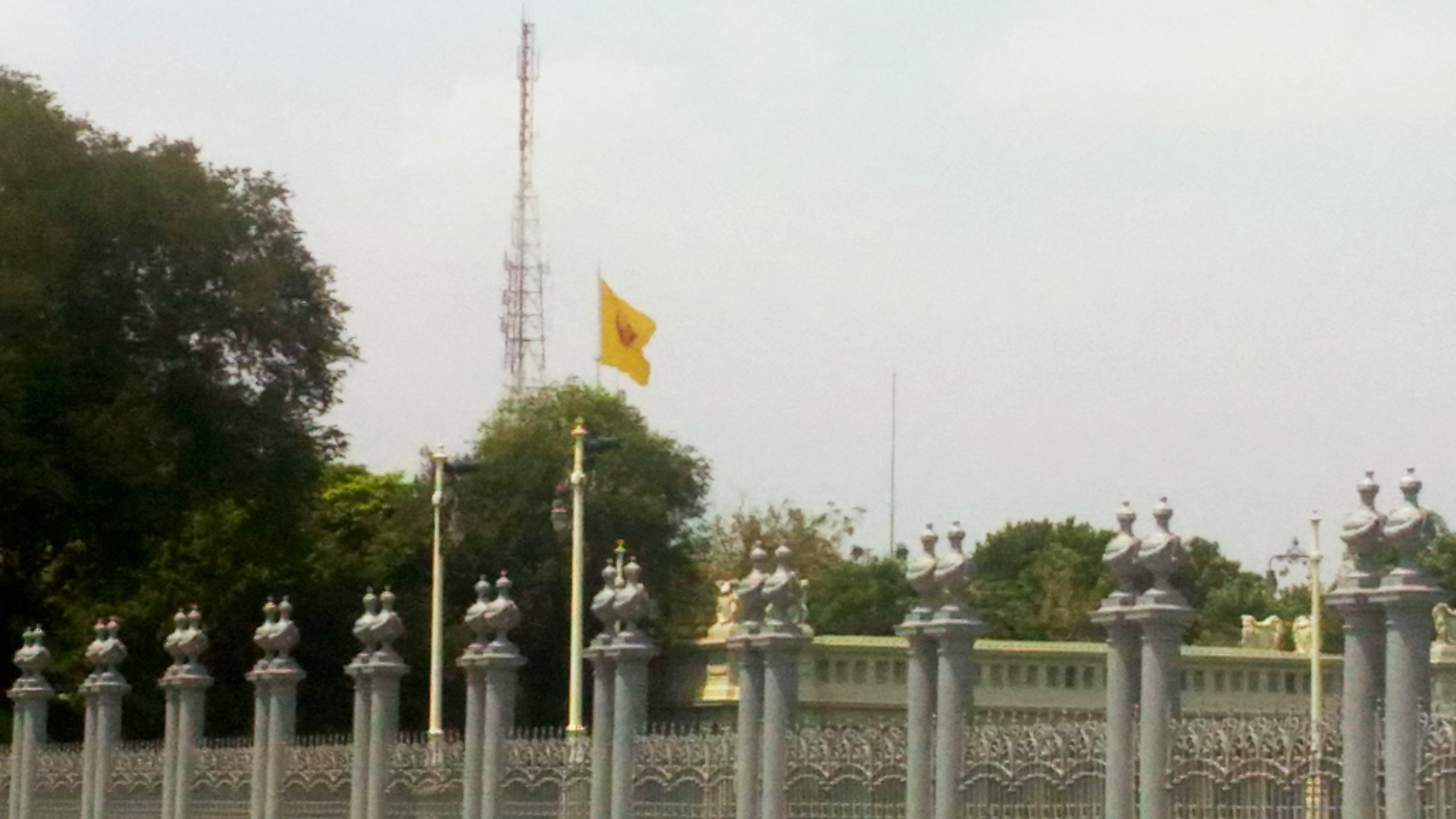
Royal Standard of Thailand at Dusit Palace in 2017

King Vajiralongkorn chose to keep his residence at the Amphorn Sathan Residential Hall, where he was already living before the death of his father Bhumibol. In 2019, the National Assembly of Thailand moved into new premises, named the Sappaya-Sapasathan. As a result, the old parliament building was returned to the King and was promptly demolished and the area was merged into part of the Dusit Palace.

Currently several museums and exhibitions are displayed inside the various buildings within the Dusit Palace precinct, only a few of these are open to the public.

== Layout ==
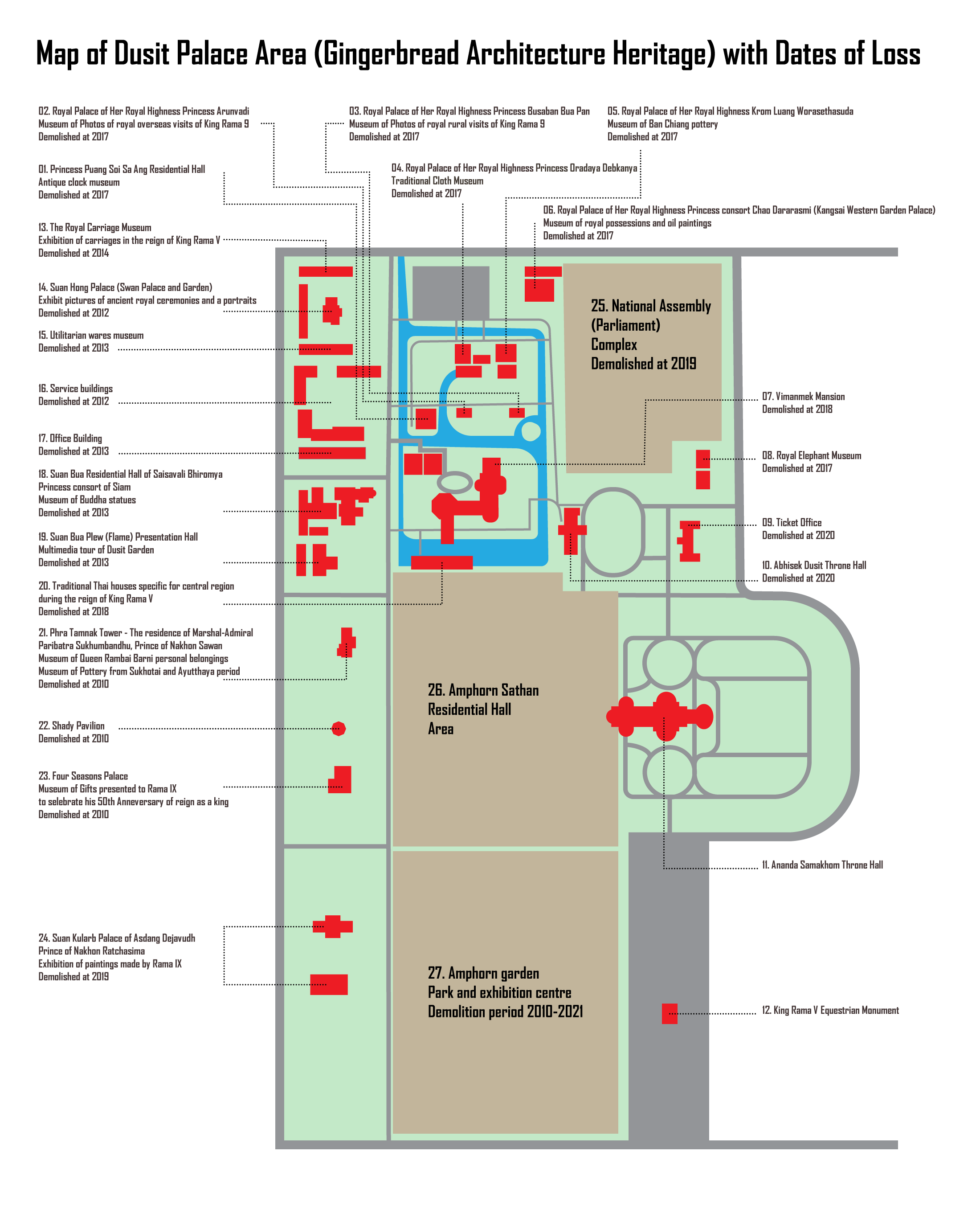
Map of Dusit Palace. With dates of demolition.

Like all Thai royal palaces of the past, Dusit Palace is divided into three areas: the outer, middle, and inner courts. However unlike the Grand Palace, the Dusit Palace courts were organized differently and were separated by canals and gardens as opposed to walls. The king allocated different residential halls and gardens to his consorts and children. The gardens are connected by gates with names drawn from motifs on blue and white Chinese porcelain ware, which the king picked out himself. The gates were specifically named after human or animal motifs, while the name of the paths were taken from floral motifs.

=== Main edifices ===
Map of Dusit Palace. Dark green marks the current area of the palace; light green marks the historical area.

- Vimanmek Mansion (1903) – Oldest residential building of the Dusit Palace complex; under renovation.
- Abhisek Dusit Throne Hall (1904) – Built as a banqueting and festival space, now houses the Thai Handicrafts Museum.
- Amphorn Sathan Residential Hall (1906) – Main residential building of the Dusit Palace complex, currently the residence of King Maha Vajiralongkorn.
- Ananta Samakhom Throne Hall (1908) – Built as an audience chamber and throne hall. Served as the seat of the Parliament of Thailand from 1932 to 1974. Currently closed to the public, only used for important royal ceremonies.
- Chitralada Royal Villa (1913) – The primary residence of King Bhumibol Adulyadej from 1957 to 2016, was home to Queen Mother Sirikit until her death.

=== Minor edifices ===
- Suan Si Ruedu Royal Villa
- Suan Hong Royal Villa
- Suan Nok Mai Royal Villa
- Suan Bua Royal Villa
- HRH Princess Bussabun Bua-Phan Residential Hall
- HRH Princess Arun-Wadi Residential Hall
- HRH Princess Puang Soi Sa-ang Residential Hall
- HRH Princess Orathai Thep Kanya Residential Hall
- Krom Luang Vorased Thasuda Residential Hall
- Tamnak Suan Farang Kangsai Residential Hall
- Tamnka Suan Phudtan Residential Hall
- Tamnak Hor Residential Hall
- Paruskavan Palace
- Suan Kularb Mansion

== See also ==
- Royal Plaza
- Grand Palace
- Phaya Thai Palace
- Dusit District
- Dusit Zoo
- List of Thai royal residences
