= Marsi Paribatra =

Thai princess (1930–2013)

Marsi Sukhumbhand Paribatra
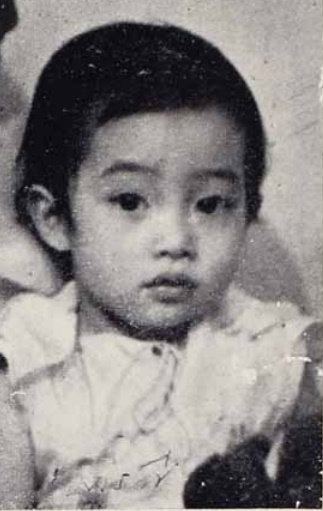
- Born: 25 August 1930; Bangkok, Thailand
- Died: 9 July 2013 (aged 82); Annot, France
- Spouse: Jacques Bousquet
- House: Paribatra family (Chakri Dynasty)
- Father: Prince Chumbhotbongs Paribatra
- Mother: Pantip Devakula
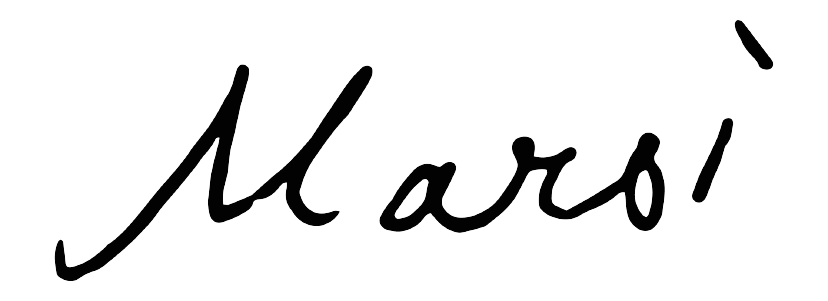
- Signature

Marsi Sukhumbhand Paribatra (Thai: มารศีสุขุมพันธุ์ บริพัตร; RTGS: Marasisukhumphan Boriphat; 25 August 1930 – 9 July 2013) was the only daughter of Prince Chumbhot Paripatra, Prince of Nakhon Sawan. She was also an artist. Her style was Mom Chao Ying (HSH).

== Early life and career ==
Princess Marsi Paribatra was born in Bangkok, Thailand, but spent much of her childhood abroad in Java, Indonesia and England, United Kingdom, as her father left Thailand in the wake of the Siamese Revolution of 1932. After World War II, she completed her education in Switzerland, France and Spain and was the first female pupil at Aiglon College. In 1954, she was awarded a doctorate (Docteur ès lettres) at the University of Paris for her thesis Le romantisme contemporain. She gained a second doctorate in art history at the University of Madrid in 1959. She went on to take lecturing posts in Madrid and Bangkok (Chulalongkorn University).

She gave up lecturing to become a self-taught artist, giving a first exhibition in 1962 at the Silpa Bhirasri Art Centre in Bangkok, before exhibiting regularly in Paris at the Musée d’Art Moderne between 1964 and 1972.

In 2004, Marsi Paribatra was partially paralysed by a stroke that stopped her from ever painting again, Marsi Paribatra wanted to establish a charitable foundation in Thailand, but French law would have made money transfers difficult. In 2009, Marsi Paribatra's cousin, Jisnuson Svasti, helped her set up the Marsi Foundation.

== Illness and death ==
Marsi Paribatra died at her home in Annot, southern France, after an illness on 9 July 2013 aged 82.
