= Abhisek Dusit Throne Hall =

Abhisek Dusit Throne Hall Thai: พระที่นั่งอภิเศกดุสิต
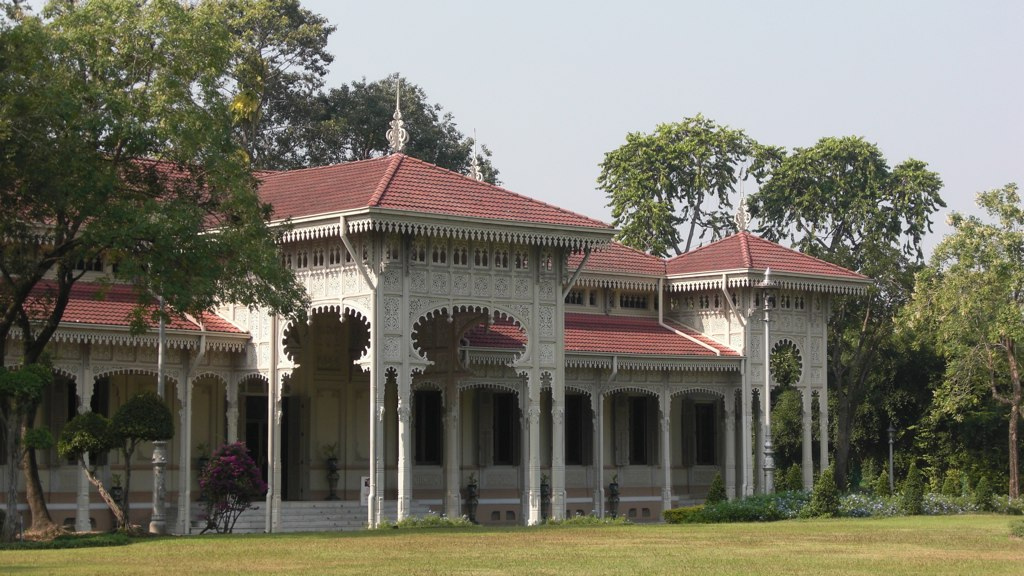
- Abhisek Dusit Throne Hall.

- Location within Thailand

General information
- Location: Thailand
- Coordinates: 13°46′25″N 100°30′47″E
- Construction started: 1903
- Completed: 1904

Technical details
- Structural system: Dusit Palace

Abhisek Dusit Throne Hall (Thai: พระที่นั่งอภิเศกดุสิต; RTGS: Aphisek Dusit) or the Thai Handicraft Museum is a Throne Hall located within Dusit Palace to use as a throne hall and banquet facilities for Dusit Palace. Its construction started in 1903 and completed in 1904 in the reign of King Chulalongkorn. Architectural design by Mario Tamagno. Currently it use for a museum about Thai Handicraft in Bangkok, Thailand.

== History ==
Abhisek Dusit Throne Hall was the throne hall that built at the same time with the construction of Dusit Palace. It is a single floor building and decorated with a lot of wood interweave with Moorish architecture style. This throne is located in the east of Vimanmek Mansion. The Throne Hall created by King Chulalongkorn after he came back from the first royal trip to Europe. To use as a throne hall and banquet facilities for Dusit Palace included used exclusively for state occasions such as receiving foreign ambassadors, during the time of the Dusit Palace.

In 1993, King Bhumibol and Queen Sirikit granting permission to renovate this throne to displays art and crafts of The Foundation of the Promotion of Supplementary Occupations and Related Techniques of Her Majesty Queen Sirikit or Silapacheep Foundation and the collectables of Queen Sirikit. Exhibits include traditional weaving and wood carvings, traditional ‘Mudmee’ silk, and ceramics.

== Architecture ==
Abhisek Dusit Throne Hall is an example of gingerbread houses that gained popularity during the reign of King Chulalongkorn. The embellishment was done using "Floral Pattern" fretworks and stained glasses throughout the building.
