= Suan Pakkad Palace =

Museum in Thailand

Coordinates: 13°45′24″N 100°32′15″E

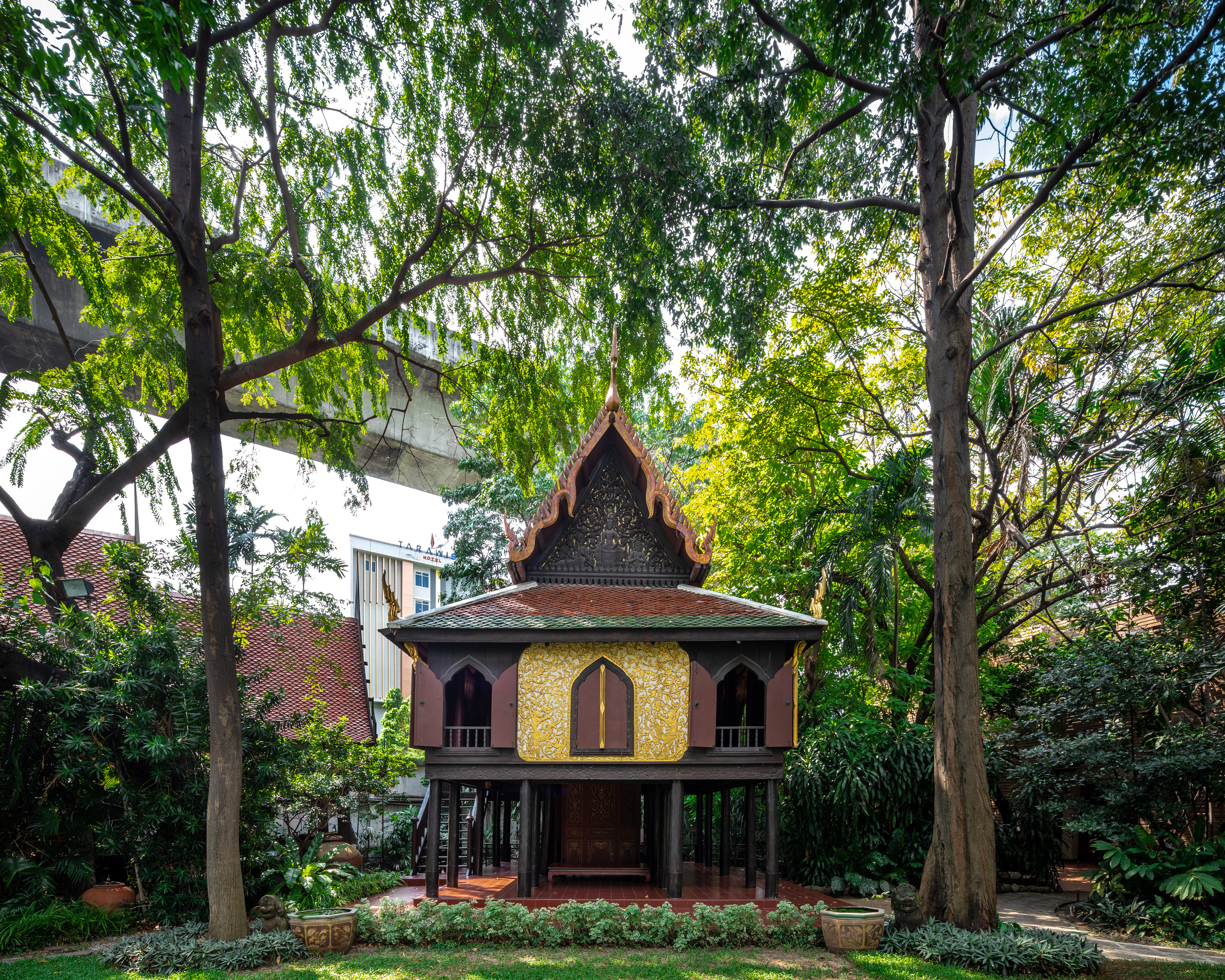
Suan Pakkad Palace: The Lacquer Pavilion in 2023

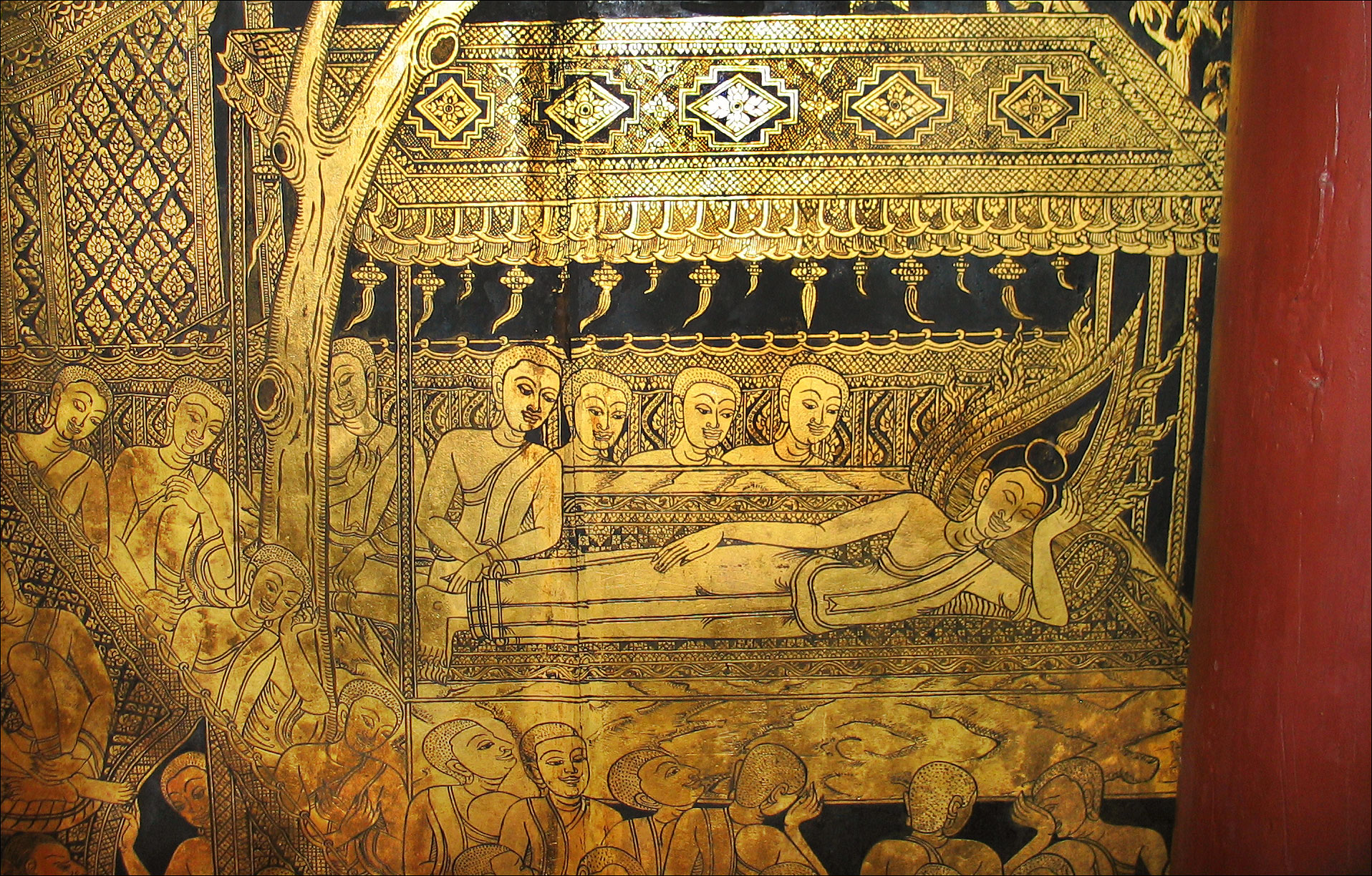
The Lacquer Pavilion: gold-on-lacquer wall painting showing the reclining Buddha

Suan Pakkad Palace or Suan Pakkard Palace (Thai: วังสวนผักกาด, RTGS: Wang Suan Phak Kat, pronounced [waŋ.sǔan.pʰàk.kàːt]) is a museum in Bangkok, Thailand. It is located on Si Ayutthaya Road, south of the Victory Monument. The museum has Thai antiques on display, including Ban Chiang pottery which is over 4,000 years old. Originally the home of Prince Chumbhotbongs Paribatra (1904–1959) and his wife, they converted it into a museum which opened in 1952. The museum features a group of four traditional Thai houses with covered hallways between them. There is also artwork on display in its Marsi Gallery.

The name Suan Pakkad translates as "Cabbage Patch", but the museum's collection of five traditional pavilions is one of the best examples of traditional domestic architecture in the city. The Lacquer Pavilion is the most striking building, and is over 450 years old.

== Literature ==
- Lenzi, Iola (2004). Museums of Southeast Asia. Singapore: Archipelago Press. p. 200 pages. ISBN 981-4068-96-9.
- Thailand, The National Geographic Traveler, page 95, 2001.
