= Chumbhotbongs Paribatra =

- Prince of Nakhon Sawan II
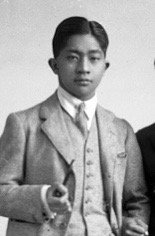
- Born: 5 December 1904; Bangkok, Siam
- Died: 15 September 1959 (aged 54); Bangkok, Thailand
- Spouse: Mom Rajawongse Pantip Devakula
- Issue: Princess Marsri Sukhumbandh Paribatra
- House: Paribatra family (Chakri Dynasty)
- Father: Paribatra Sukhumbhandu, Prince of Nakhon Sawan
- Mother: Princess Prasongsom Jayanta

Chumbhotbongs Paribatra, Prince of Nakhon Sawan II (Thai: จุมภฏพงษ์บริพัตร; RTGS: Chumphotphong Boriphat, 5 December 1904 – 15 September 1959). He married Mom Ratchawong Pantip Devakula (Thai: พันธุ์ทิพย์ เทวกุล; RTGS: Phanthip Thewakun). Their daughter is the artist, Princess Marsi Paribatra.

The only surviving male descendant of royal blood from Queen Sukhumala Marasri and an indirect first cousin of the late King Bhumibol Adulyadej (since his father and Prince Mahidol Adulyadej are half-brothers), Chumbhotpong Paripatra was a potential heir to the Thai throne according to the 1924 Palace Law of Succession.

In 1952, Prince Chumbhot converted his private residence into the Suan Pakkad Palace.

== Educations ==
- Debsirin School
- Harrow School, UK
- Christ Church, Oxford, University of Oxford

Chumbhotbongs Paribatra House of Paribatra Cadet branch of the House of Chakri Born: 5 December 1904 Died: 15 September 1959
Non-profit organization positions
Preceded by Chuang Chaungsakdisongkram	Vice President of Thai Red Cross Society; 1948 – 1959	Vacant Title next held by Chaophraya Sri Thammathibet
