= Oradaya Debkanya =

Thai princess

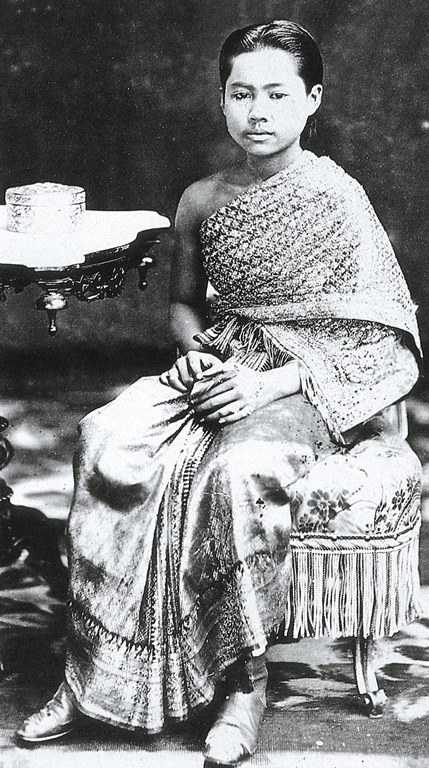
- Born: 18 September 1859; Bangkok, Siam
- Died: 4 April 1906 (aged 46); Bangkok, Siam
Names
- Oradaya Debkanya
- House: Chakri Dynasty
- Father: Mongkut (Rama IV)
- Mother: Bua Na Nakhon

Princess Oradaya Debkanya (Thai: อรไทยเทพกัญญา ; RTGS: Orathai Thepkanya ; 18 September 1859 – 4 April 1906) was a princess of Siam (later Thailand). She was a member of the Siamese royal family and was a daughter of King Mongkut and Consort Bua.

Her mother was Chao Chom Manda Bua Na Nakhon (a daughter of Phraya Nakhon Noi Na Nakhon). She was given the full name Phra Chao Borom Wong Ther Phra Ong Chao Oradaya Debkanya (Thai: พระเจ้าบรมวงศ์เธอ พระองค์เจ้าอรไทยเทพกัญญา) by her father.

Princess Oradaya Debkanya died on 4 April 1906 at the age of 46.
