= Buraphaphirom Palace =

Palace in Bangkok, Thailand

Coordinates: 13°44′45″N 100°30′5″E

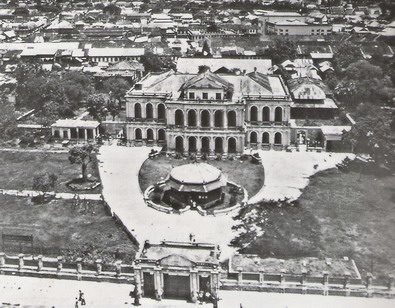
Buraphaphirom Palace in 1946

Buraphaphirom Palace (Thai: วังบูรพาภิรมย์, RTGS: Wang Burapha Phirom, pronounced [waŋ buː.ra.pʰaː.pʰí.rōːm]) was a royal residence located in Bangkok, Thailand. It was built in 1875 by order of King Chulalongkorn (Rama V) as the home of Prince Bhanurangsi Savangwongse, founder of the Bhanubandhu royal lineage.

Designed in the colonial style by Italian architect Joachim Grassi, the palace featured three grand two-story buildings. Its name translates to "Delightful East Palace", and it was considered one of the most magnificent royal residences of its time. The palace grounds extended from Maha Chai Fort all the way to Saphan Lek.

Following World War II, the palace fell into disuse and was eventually rented out as the site of Bhanuthat Girls' School. In 1951, Prince Bhanurangsi's heir sold the property to businessman Osot Kosin for nearly 13 million baht. The palace was demolished in 1954 to make way for a modern commercial complex, which included three movie theatres: Kings, Queens, and Grand (not counting the nearby Sala Chalermkrung Royal Theatre).

The former site of Buraphaphirom Palace became known as Wang Burapha, Bangkok's liveliest shopping and entertainment district during the 1950s and 1960s, especially popular among the younger generation of the era.

Wang Burapha's popularity declined in 1965 when newer centres like Ratchaprasong and Siam Square began to draw the crowds. Today, the former palace grounds are home to Mega Plaza, a shopping mall established to accommodate vendors relocated from Khlong Thom and Saphan Lek.

== See more ==
- List of Thai royal residences
