= Privy Purse Bureau =

Properties owned by the Thai monarchy

- สำนักงานพระคลังข้างที่

Agency overview
- Formed: February 18, 1948 (78 years ago)
- Preceding Agency: The Royal Treasury
- Type: Independent
- Jurisdiction: Government of Thailand
- Headquarters: Ladawan Palace, 173 Nakornratchasima Rd., Dusit, Bangkok 10300
- Agency executives: Satitpong Sukvimol, Chairman of the Board and Director-General; Thumnithi Wanichthanom, Senior Deputy Director-General; Apirat Kongsompong, Deputy Director-General; Supaporn Treesaen, Deputy Director-General; Chusiri Kaiyanan, Deputy Director-General
- Key documents: Crown Property Act 1936†; Crown Property Act 2017†; Crown Property Act 2018
- Website: privypurse.or.th

Footnotes
- † The act was repealed and replaced by a consult and approval from National Legislative Assembly of Thailand (2014).

The Privy Purse Bureau, (Note: Thai: สำนักงานพระคลังข้างที่; RTGS: samnakngan phra khlang khang thi) known from 1948 to 2025 as the Crown Property Bureau (CPB), (Note: สำนักงานทรัพย์สินส่วนพระมหากษัตริย์, samnak ngan sap sin suan phra maha kasat until 2018; สำนักงานทรัพย์สินพระมหากษัตริย์, RTGS: samnak ngan sap sin phra maha kasat since then) is a royal agency responsible for managing the property of the King of Thailand.

The Crown Property Bureau was originally set up following reforms to royal property following the abolition of absolute monarchy, which placed crown property—mostly investments and real estate holdings—under the control of the Ministry of Finance. In 1948, the CPB was set up as an independent juristic person, chaired by the Minister of Finance but operating outside the purview of the government, with its proceeds to be spent at the royal pleasure. During the reign of King Bhumibol Adulyadej (1946–2016), it was claimed that crown property does not belong to the king in his private capacity, but to the monarchy as an institution which continues from reign to reign. The bureau's unclear legal status, as an administrative agency of the state but not a government agency, was also subject to much legal analysis.

After the accession of King Vajiralongkorn, new laws were passed that put crown property within the king's personal ownership, and re-established the CPB as a royal agency with its chair appointed by the king. In 2018, the King was granted full, personal ownership of royal assets thought to be worth at least $70bn to as much as $130bn. In 2025, its name was changed to the Privy Purse Bureau, reverting to the title of its precursor during the absolute monarchy period.

== Organisation and budget ==
The CPB is headed by Director-General Air Chief Marshal Satitpong Sukvimol. CPB Property Co., Ltd. and CPB Equity Co., Ltd., both subsidiaries of the bureau, are headed by Michael David Selby, former partner of Business Advisory Indonesia and former employee of a United States government agency. During the late-1980s, the CPB had 600 employees, of which 90 percent were devoted to managing the bureau's massive real estate holdings. In 2004, the CPB recorded over five billion baht in earnings. The CPB reportedly controls more than US$37 billion in assets—some say as much as US$59.4 billion—that, according to Thai law, can be spent "at the king's pleasure."

Despite the wealth of the CPB, the royal family receives funds from the government for expenses. Around US$170 million annually in state funding covers the salaries of staff working in Bureau of the Royal Household and other palace offices, plus security provided for the royal family by police and armed forces. Public funds also cover the costs of many royal rural development projects. Separately, there is the "budget for the promotion of the dignity of the monarchy", which is granted to government offices for propaganda works. This came to US$438 million in 2015.

== Background ==
The Crown Property Bureau was established under the Royal Assets Structuring Act of 1936 and became a juristic person in 1948. According to the act, a Board of Crown Property was set up, to be chaired ex officio by the finance minister, and served by at least four royally appointed directors. The king names one of the board members as the director-general of the CPB. The Board of Crown Property is responsible for the overall supervision of the activities of the Crown Property Bureau. Duties and responsibilities of the director-general are prescribed by the Board of Crown Property.

Initially, the CPB was under the jurisdiction of the Royal Treasury of the Royal Household Bureau. On 21 April 1935, the 1934 act to exempt royal assets from taxation took effect. The act categorised royal assets into two types:

1. Assets eligible for tax exemption
2. Assets eligible for tax payment

On 19 July 1937, the Royal Assets Structuring Act of 1936 became effective. It separated the royal assets into "His Majesty's personal assets", "crown property", and "public property". "His Majesty's personal assets" would be managed by the finance ministry. The CPB was set up with a status equivalent to a division under the treasury department of the finance ministry. Some of the functions, responsibilities, and officials were transferred from the Office of the Privy Purse to the Crown Property Bureau which sought permission to locate its office on the premises of the Office of the Privy Purse on the grounds of the Grand Palace in Bangkok.

The Royal Assets Structuring Act has been amended three times: the second amendment (1941) took effect on 7 October 1941, the third amendment (1948) was promulgated on 18 February 1948 when the CPB's status was then elevated to a juristic person responsible for supervising, preserving, and managing crown property. The CPB director-general is authorized to affix his signature on behalf of the bureau. In July 2017, under the new bill, King Vajiralongkorn will set up a board of directors to oversee his assets. The king is entitled to appoint the board members, as well as to remove them, at his discretion. The law prohibits the taking away of royal assets without the king's approval. Under King Bhumibol, the board of directors for the royal assets answered to the finance minister. Now it is independent of the government.

The Crown Property Bureau has moved its office four times, with Ladawan Palace (commonly referred to as the "Red Palace") having been its home since 18 July 1946. The anniversary of the CPB's establishment is marked on 18 February.

== Mission ==
Old emblem of the Crown Property Bureau.

The CPB claims to be responsible for protecting and managing the royal assets and property as well as supporting other activities for the benefit of Thai subjects and society. The Crown Property Bureau, however, is under no obligation to detail its holdings or how profits are spent.

== Assets ==
=== Real estate ===
The CPB owns approximately 6,560 hectares (16,200 acres) of property throughout Thailand. The bureau owns 10 km^{2} in Bangkok, mainly in the city center. The specific tracts of land owned by the CPB in Bangkok have not been made public. Through its shares of Siam Cement Group and Siam Commercial Bank, the bureau received dividends from 2010 equivalent to more than US$200 million.

In central Bangkok, the CPB owns 10 km^{2} or 3,320 acres (estimates are contradictory) and another 13,200 acres elsewhere in Thailand. In 2008, the Bangkok holdings alone were estimated at US$31 billion in value. Historically, the bureau would rent the land cheaply to small shop owners and members of the lower class.

In 2010, aggregate income from property came to 2.5 billion baht (US$80 million at 2012 rates). Prime real estate includes CentralWorld, a shopping mall, and the nearby Four Seasons hotel. In total, the CPB says it has 40,000 rental contracts, of which 17,000 are in Bangkok.

The CPB renews tenant lease contracts every three years for rent rationalization and planned site development consistent with long-term city planning considerations. The CPB has the authority to assist tenants who are affected by floods or political unrest with rent and fee reductions.

With Bangkok's real estate values increasing in 2017, with average land prices projected to climb four percent, the CPB negotiated deals for some of its central Bangkok prime real estate:

- TCC Group, a family-owned conglomerate known for brewery subsidiary, Thai Beverage, leased a plot from the Crown Property Bureau in central Bangkok for up to 60 years. The space will house One Bangkok, the nation's largest-ever private redevelopment project, valued at 120 billion baht (US$3.6 billion).
- Central Pattana, the property development unit of retailer, Central Group, will close the Dusit Thani Hotel and replace it with a 36.7 billion-baht mixed-use project that is to include a new Dusit hotel and shopping mall. It extended its CPB lease for the land and was able to gain an additional 8,000 m^{2} of land.
- The CPB's fully owned subsidiary, Siam Sindhorn, opened a condo in 2017, selling units at twice the market price. The project, an 89,600 m^{2} hybrid facility, is to be fully completed in 2019.

=== Investments ===
- The CPB makes long-term investments in selected businesses such as the Siam Cement Group (SCG) (30 percent ownership), the largest Thai industrial conglomerate, and Siam Commercial Bank (SCB) (21 percent ownership), the country's first commercial bank. Through its shares of SCG and SCB, the bureau received dividends from 2010 equivalent to more than US$200 million. The CPB has the majority holding in the Kempinski Hotels group which was sold to an investor from Bahrain in February 2017. Prince Vajiralongkorn often stayed at the Kempinski Munich prior to the purchase of a home on Lake Starnberg, 25 kilometres southwest of Munich.
- Siam Bioscience is wholly owned by a subsidiary of the CPB. Siam Bio, which had never before produced vaccines, was selected to receive technology transfers from pharmaceutical firm AstraZeneca to make 60 million doses for Thailand and 200 million vaccine doses for other nations. Thailand ordered 61 million doses of the AstraZeneca vaccine, to be ready from June 2021.

== Corporate social responsibility ==
The CPB has expanded its diversified social projects such as temple restorations, and rice research and development with the Rice Department of the Ministry of Agriculture and Cooperatives.

"Youth development" is promoted jointly in partnership with the SCB and the SCG. The projects have been aimed at supporting the Ministry of Education for inculcating the king's "sufficiency economy" philosophy in the Thai school system and the establishment of the Nitasrattanakosin Exhibition Hall on Ratchadamnoen Avenue for Thai youth to learn, appreciate, and take pride in Thailand's artistic and cultural accomplishments of the Rattanakosin era. The CPB has supported numerous other projects such as scholarships for Thai youth.

=== Conservation ===
In 2016, the CPB joined with the Bangkok Metropolitan Administration (BMA) to develop land near the Chao Phraya River to build Nagaraphirom Park, surrounding historical buildings.

== See also ==
- Monarchy of Thailand
