= Amphorn Sathan Residential Hall =

Royal residence in Bangkok, Thailand

Coordinates: 13.7725°N 100.5114°E

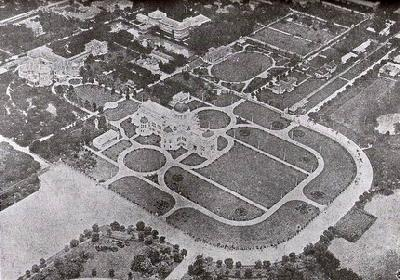
Aerial view of Dusit Palace, The 'Amphorn Sathan Residential Hall' can be seen on the top left of the picture.

The Amphorn Sathan Residential Hall or the Ambara Villa (Thai: พระที่นั่งอัมพรสถาน, RTGS: Phra Thinang Amphon Sathan, Thai pronunciation: [pʰráʔ tʰîː.nâŋ ʔām.pʰɔ̄ːn.sà.tʰǎːn]) is a royal mansion situated inside Bangkok's Dusit Palace. It served as the primary residence of the former King Bhumibol Adulyadej (Rama IX) and former Queen Sirikit of Thailand, and was the birthplace of King Vajiralongkorn.

== History ==
Construction began in 1890 on the order of King Chulalongkorn (Rama V) who wanted a European style mansion built inside the Dusit Gardens. The residence was initially named the 'Ivory Garden' (Thai: สวนแง่เต๋ง). The name was later changed to the “Amphorn Sathan Residential Hall” or the Phra Thinang Amphorn Sathan; translated as: 'The royal seat in the sky'.

Chaophraya Yommarat, Minister of Public Works of Siam, was the director of construction in 1906 and celebrated the completion of the new building with a ceremony lasting from 18 to 22 February 1906. King Rama V lived in the residence and died there in 1910. Both kings Vajiravudh (Rama VI) and Prajadhipok (Rama VII) spent time in this residence during their respective reigns. When King Bhumibol Adulyadej (Rama IX) came back permanently from Switzerland in 1950, he decided to live in the Amphorn Sathan Residential Hall before his coronation ceremony. As renovations were being carried out in the preferred Chitralada Royal Villa, the king, Queen Sirikit and the growing royal family remained living at Amphorn Sathan. Once the renovations were completed at Chitralada in 1957, the king and the royal family moved out. During the royal couple's stay at the hall, three of their children were born here: Prince Vajiralongkorn on 28 July 1952, Princess Sirindhorn 2 April 1955 and Princess Chulabhorn 4 July 1957.

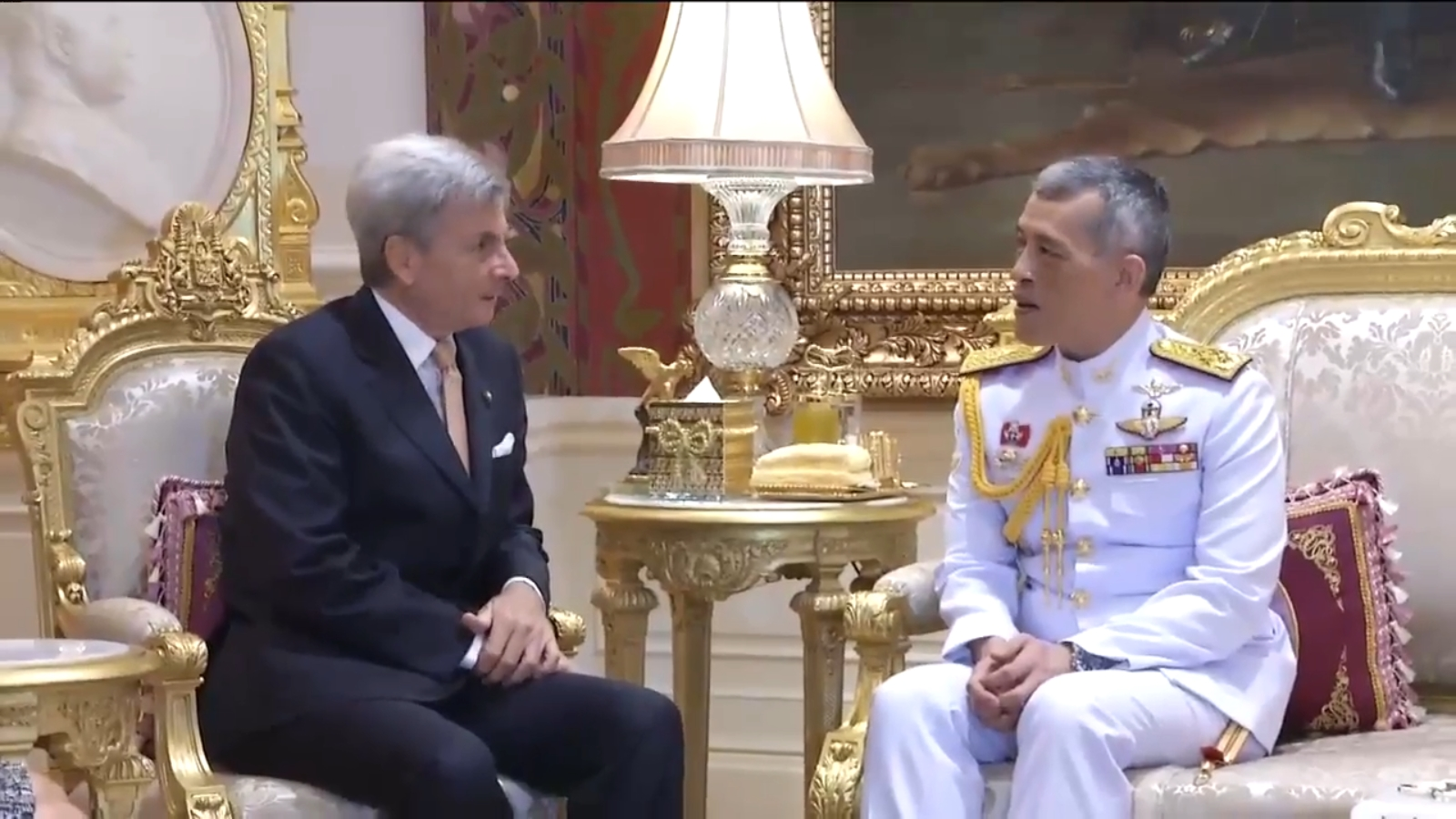
King Vajiralongkorn with Italian ambassador Francesco Saverio Nisio inside Amphorn Sathan Residential Hall

The residence is known to most Thais as the location of many of King Bhumibol's early musical broadcasts on the radio. In 1952, the king established the A.S. (Amporn Sathan) Radio Station. From the residence, the king would jam with various jazz musicians and his own band every Friday, including playing some of his own compositions. Pathorn Srikaranonda, one of the king's band members, remembered that: "Anyone could call in to request music. If the band couldn't play that song, then he would play the record instead. He even answered the phone himself. People didn't know they were speaking to the King as His Majesty didn't like to reveal his presence". The king's band was called the 'A.S. Friday'.

In 1972, Prince Vajiralongkorn was made Crown Prince of Thailand and was granted the residence by the king as his official home. On 7 December 1978, Princess Bajrakitiyabha, Vajiralongkorn's eldest child was born at the palace. On the 1 December 2016, Vajiralongkorn accepted the formal invitation from the President of the National Assembly of Thailand to accept the crown and become King Rama X inside residence's throne room. At present the Amphorn Sathan Residential Hall is the primary home and working palace of King Vajiralongkorn (Rama X) in Bangkok.

== Location ==
The residence is located on the south side of the Vimanmek Mansion and is located on the northwest side of the Ananta Samakhom Throne Hall. It is situated between Ang-yok canal and Benjamas road. The front building faces to the south east side, the back side of building is close to the Meng seng canal.

== Architecture ==
The Amphorn Sathan Residential Hall is a 3-story building in the style of a European country villa. The residence's layout resembles an H-shape, made up of two rectangular buildings constructed parallel to each other. The residence's two buildings are the Amphorn Sathan and Udon-pak wings. The two parts are connected by a vertical bridge. The exterior features two curved porches in the front.

The interior style is primarily a combination of Art Nouveau and Second Empire styles. Most of the interior was decorated with details of flowers and foliage in stucco. The edge of the doors and windows has decoration in the form of plants and organic forms made in wet colour cement technique. Moreover, there is a baluster and balustrade made of metal in natural elemental forms. The interior walls and ceilings are decorated with frescoes, painted by the Italian artists Galileo Chini and Annibale Rigotti.
