= Vimanmek Mansion =

Vimanmek Mansion Thai: พระที่นั่งวิมานเมฆ
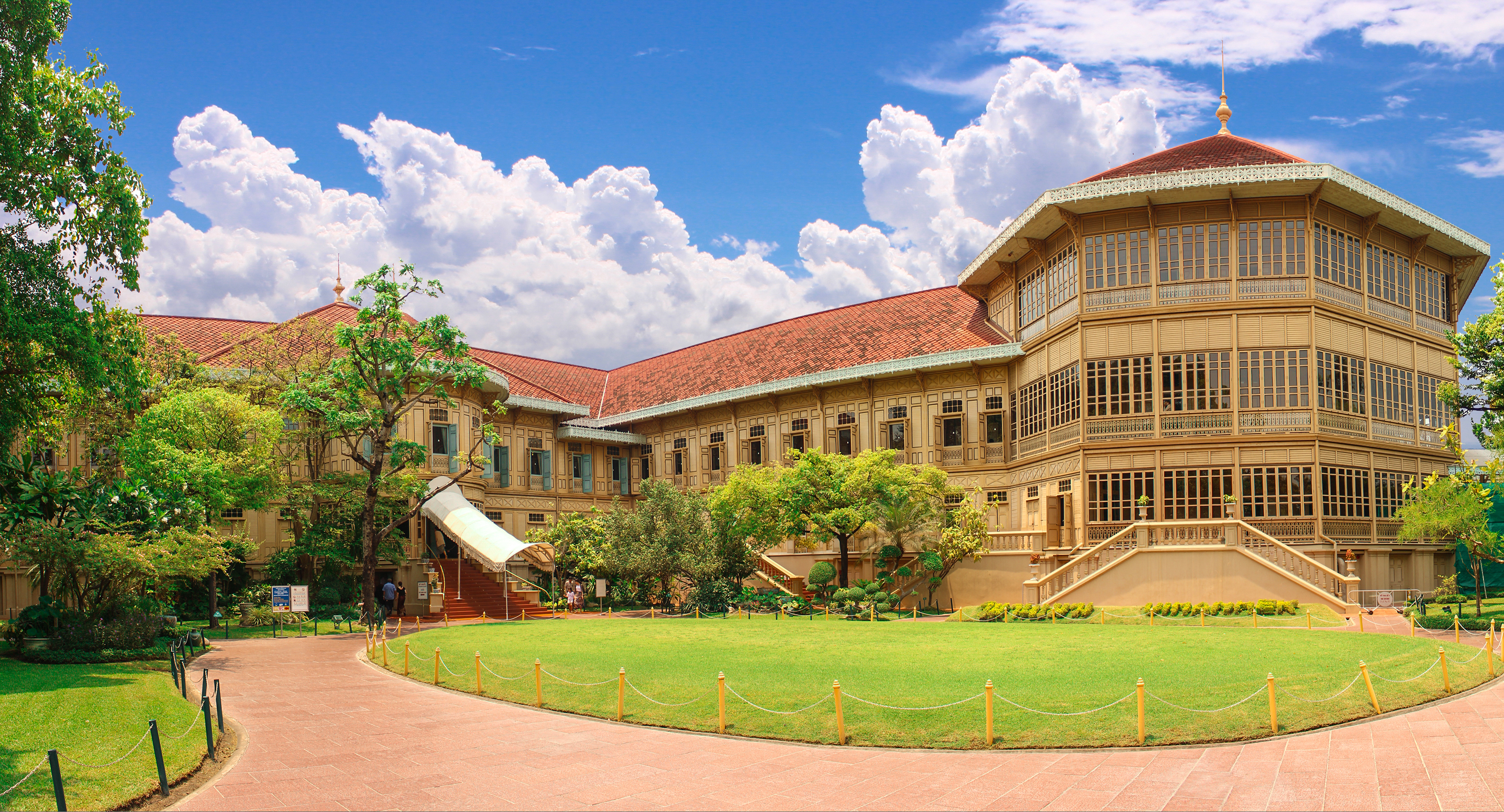
- Vimanmek Mansion, built in 1900 by King Chulalongkorn.

- Location within Thailand

General information
- Architectural style: Victorian-Thai
- Location: Thailand
- Coordinates: 13°46′26″N 100°30′46″E
- Construction started: 1897
- Inaugurated: 27 March 1901
- Renovated: 2019
- Cost: 15 million Siamese baht

Technical details
- Structural system: Dusit Palace

The Vimanmek Mansion (Thai: พระที่นั่งวิมานเมฆ, RTGS: phra thi nang wimanmek) is a former royal villa in Bangkok, Thailand. It is in the Dusit Palace complex in Dusit District. As of 2019 it has been dismantled to allow for foundation repairs and will be rebuilt upon its completion.

== History ==
In 1897 King Rama V paid a royal visit to Europe, visiting many royal palaces. Upon his return he appropriated land for the construction of a royal garden which he named "Dusit Garden".

Vimanmek Palace was constructed in 1900 by having the Munthatu Rattanaroj Residence in Phra Chuthathut Palace at Ko Sichang, Chonburi, dismantled and reassembled in Dusit Garden. It was the first permanent residence in the garden. Nails were used in its construction. The interior decoration combines European neo-classical style with traditional Thai motifs and architecture and early-20th century modernisation. Vimanmek Mansion is Victorian-style, with Western influences combined with Thai architecture. Golden teak was the primary building material. The mansion is L-shaped, 60 meters by 20 meters. It has three levels and the residence is octagonal and has four levels. The lowest level is made of brick and cement and the upper levels are constructed of golden teak. The color of the roof is cream and red in Thai architectural style and the pattern of the window and ventilators is called kanom pang khing. Each room of the mansion has a distinctive color—light blue, green, pink, ivory, or peach—and each room shows belongings of King Rama V and other noblemen.

The 72 room Vimanmek Palace was inaugurated on 27 March 1901. It was used as a royal palace by King Rama V for five years until the completion of Amphorn Sathan Residential Hall in 1906. In 1932, Vimanmek Palace was used only as a storage place by the Bureau of the Royal Household.

In 1982 Queen Sirikit asked King Rama IX, on the occasion of the Royal Bicentennial Celebrations of Bangkok, to renovate Vimanmek Palace for use as a museum to commemorate King Rama V by displaying his photographs, art works, and handicrafts, and to serve as a showcase of the Thai national heritage. The palace is now a tourist attraction and is the world's largest golden teakwood mansion.

Vimanmek Mansion has been closed to visitors since 21 July 2016. In 2018, based on the satellite image from Google Maps, Vimanmek Mansion was demolished and stored in tents on the grounds of the adjacent parliament.

In July 2019, an official in the Office of His Majesty's Principal Private Secretary clarified that the building had been disassembled to allow for the replacement of its deteriorating wood and metal pilings with steel pilings and a concrete foundation, and would be "rebuilt exactly as it looked" with the addition of a large fishpond to its north. However, it was also disclosed that it would be permanently closed and not re-opened to the public. According to documents, the cost of the construction works are estimated at 81 million baht.

== Architecture ==
Vimanmek Mansion is one of the best examples of gingerbread houses in Thailand that gained popularity during the reign of King Rama V. It is a European and Thai-Contemporary architecture that uses elaborate fretwork on windows and air passages to create detailed embellishment.

== Gallery ==
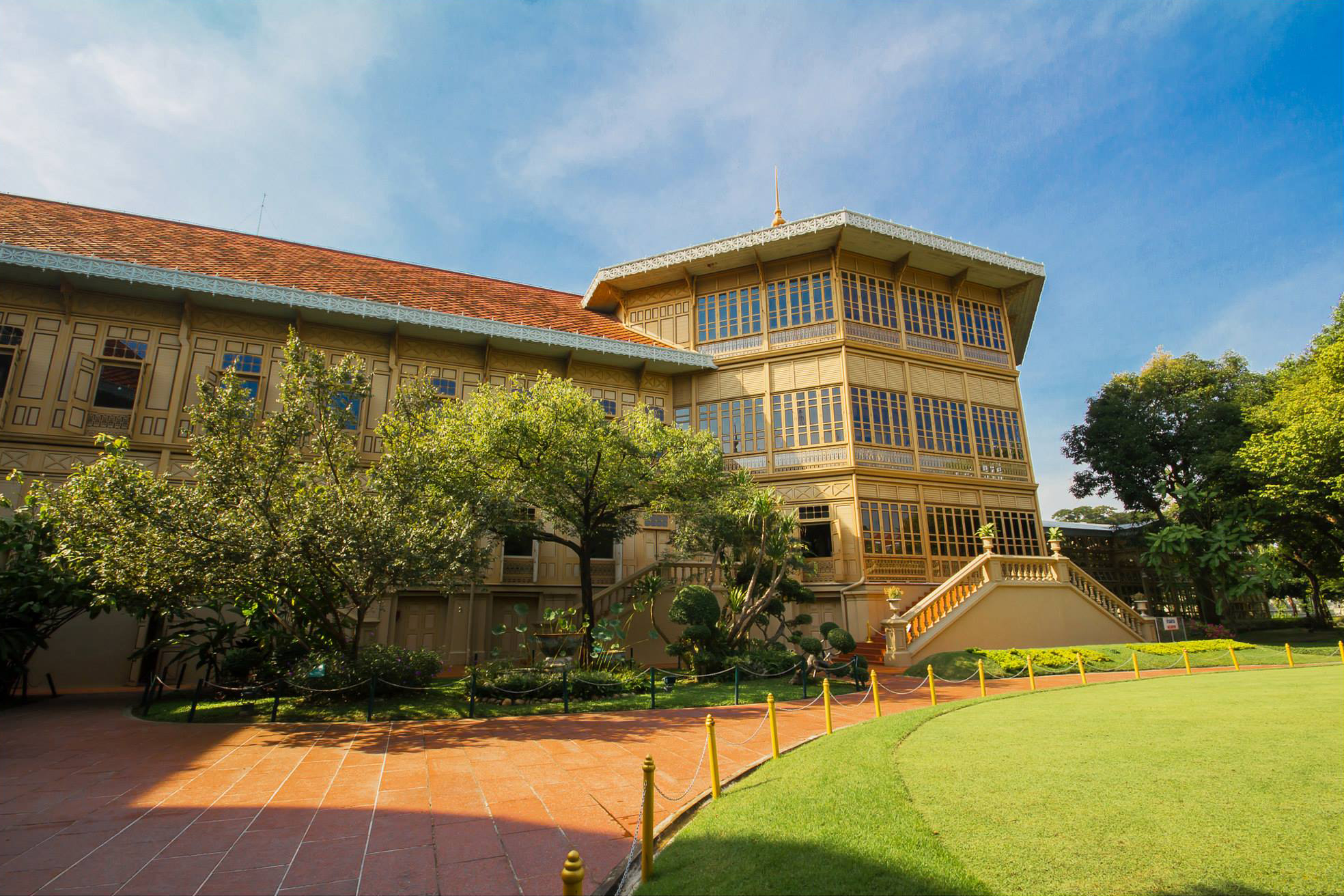
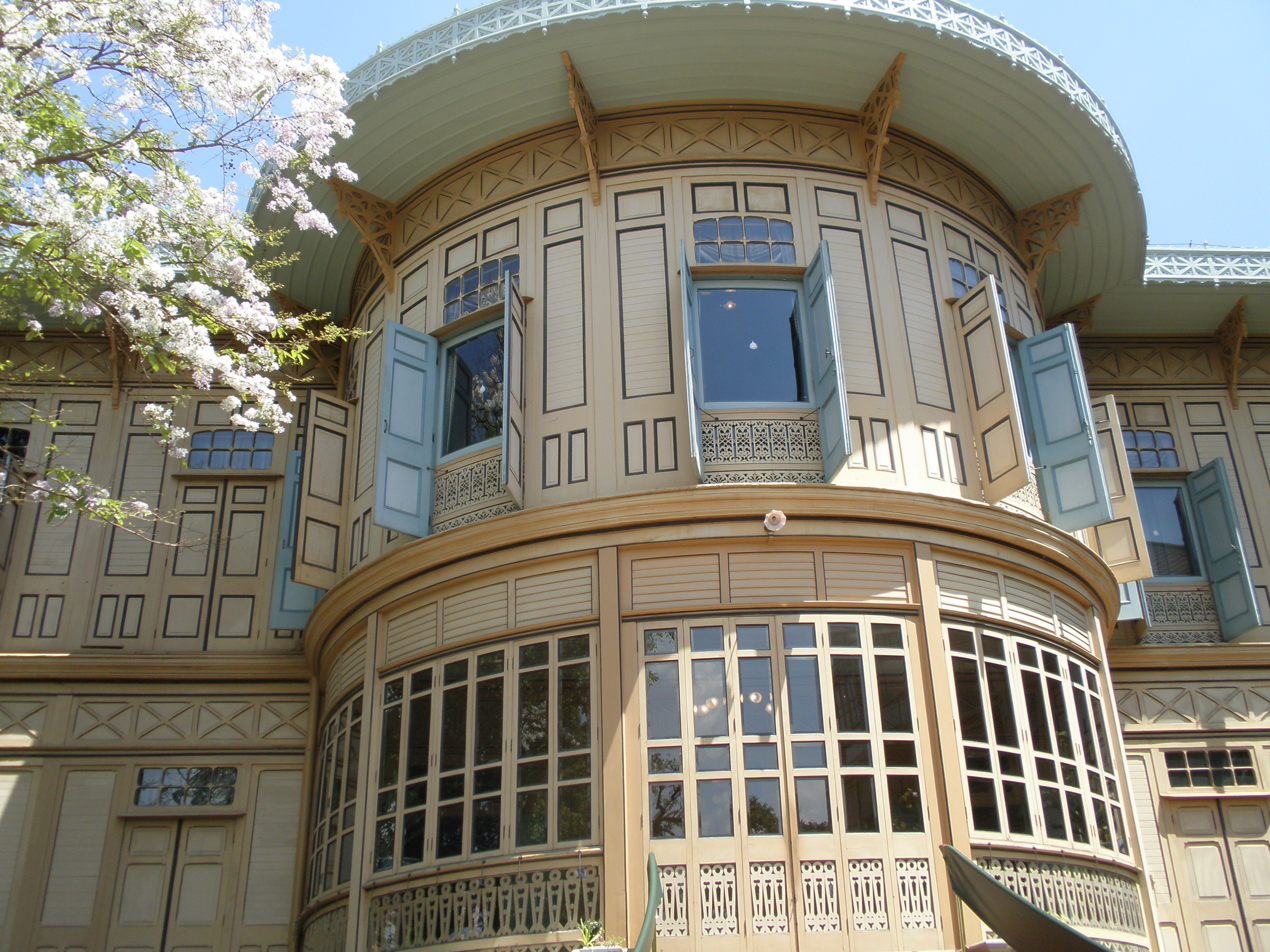
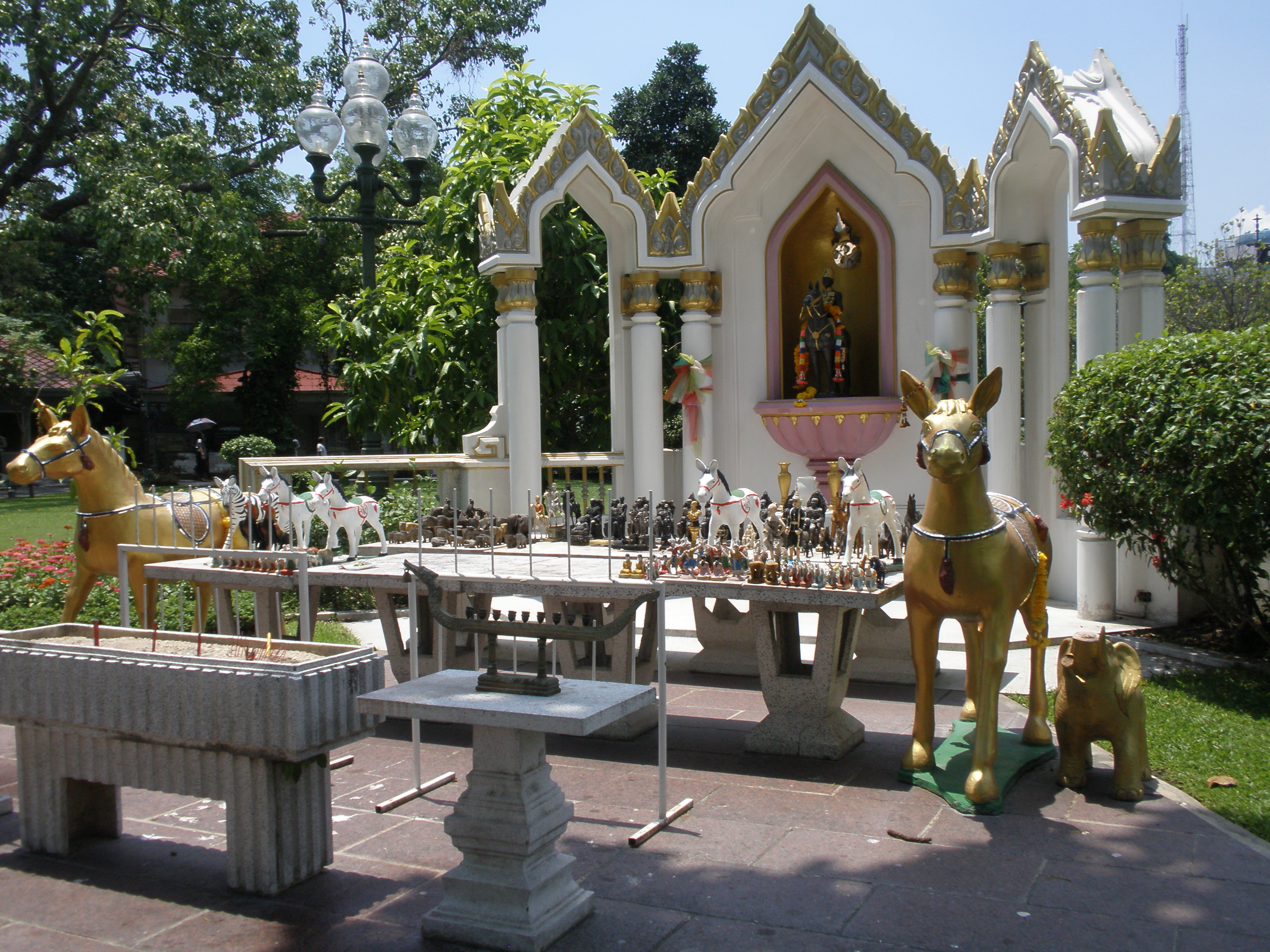
