= Valaya Alongkorn =

Princess of Phetchaburi (1884–1938)

- Princess of Phetchaburi
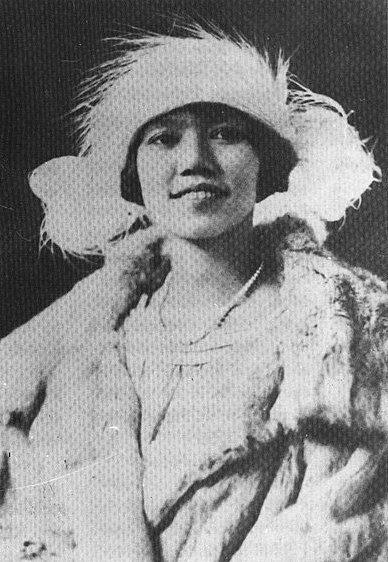
- Formal picture, c. 1908
- Born: 16 April 1884; Grand Palace, Bangkok, Siam
- Died: 15 February 1938 (aged 53); Kandhavas Palace, Bangkok, Siam
Names
- Valaya Alongkorn Narindorn Debyakumari
- House: Chakri dynasty
- Father: Chulalongkorn (Rama V)
- Mother: Savang Vadhana
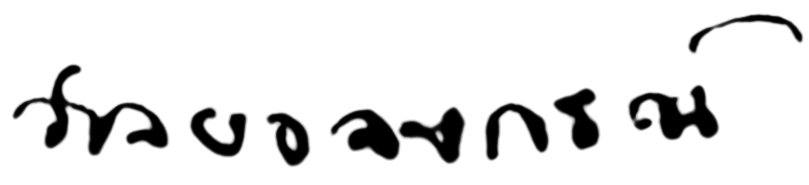
- Signature

Valaya Alongkorn, Princess of Phetchaburi (Note: Thai: วไลยอลงกรณ์; RTGS: Walai Alongkon) (16 April 1884 – 15 February 1938), was a princess of Siam (later Thailand), and a member of the Chakri dynasty. She was the daughter of King Chulalongkorn and Savang Vadhana. Her older brother Vajirunhis was the first Crown Prince of Siam. She was also the elder sister of Mahidol Adulyadej, the Prince of Songkla, and the full aunt of kings Ananda Mahidol and Bhumibol Adulyadej.

== Birth ==
Princess Valaya Alongkorn was born on 16 April 1884 at Grand Palace. She was the 43rd daughter of King Chulalongkorn, and the 5th child of Savang Vadhana, princess consort and half-sister of King Chulalongkorn, (later Queen Sri Savarindira). Her full given name was Valaya Alongkorn Narindorn Debyakumari (Note: Thai: วไลยอลงกรณ์ นรินทรเทพยกุมารี), given by her father. She had 6 siblings, 3 elder brothers, 1 elder sister, 1 younger sister, and 1 younger brother:

- Crown Prince Maha Vajirunhis of Siam (27 June 1878 – 4 January 1894)
- Prince Isariyalongkorn (4 September 1879 – 25 September 1879)
- Princess Vichitra Chiraprabha (21 April 1881 – 15 August 1881)
- Prince Sommatiwongse Varodaya, the Prince of Nakhon Si Thammarat (9 June 1882 – 17 June 1899)
- Princess Sirabhorn Sobhon (19 July 1888 – 24 May 1898)
- Prince Mahidol Adulyadej, the Prince of Songkla, (posthumously The Prince Father of Thailand; 1 January 1891 – 24 September 1929) father of Galyani Vadhana, Ananda Mahidol, and Bhumibol Adulyadej.

When she was 3 years old, her mother sent her to live with her own sister Queen Saovabha Phongsri, as an adopted daughter, due to Queen Saovabha having lost her own daughters: Bahurada Manimaya and a princess who died shortly after birth. They lived together at the Suddha Sri Abhiromya residence in the Inner court of the Grand Palace.

== Childhood ==
The princess was educated at the Kumari Royal School, which was held classes inside the Amarin Winitchai Throne Hall. When her father, King Chulalongkorn visited southern Asia in 1896, she and many of her sisters accompanied him to a visit of Java, Singapore, and Malaya. After her father finished his 1st European tour, he built the Dusit Palace and other residences, including the Vimanmek Palace. At age 17 she moved and began living with her father, her mother, and her step-siblings in these new palaces.

When the Four Seasons Garden Villa or Suan Si Ruedu was built she moved into this villa until her father's death on 23 October 1910. She then moved again to live with Queen Saovabha Phongsri at the Phayathai Palace.

== Lifestyle ==
Princess Valaya Alongkorn was an avid reader. She was fond of books and read in her spare time, day and night, ever since she was a child. Her nanny had to hide her books to make her sleep. But this did not work, as she was able to find other books in her private library to read. In the afternoons once she was finished with her royal duties she always read or write. She also knitted and was an accomplished draughtsman.

She was always dressed in European style. She did not like decorations for her dresses except pearl necklaces, which she made herself. When she went anywhere, she had her pearl necklace.

== Royal duties ==
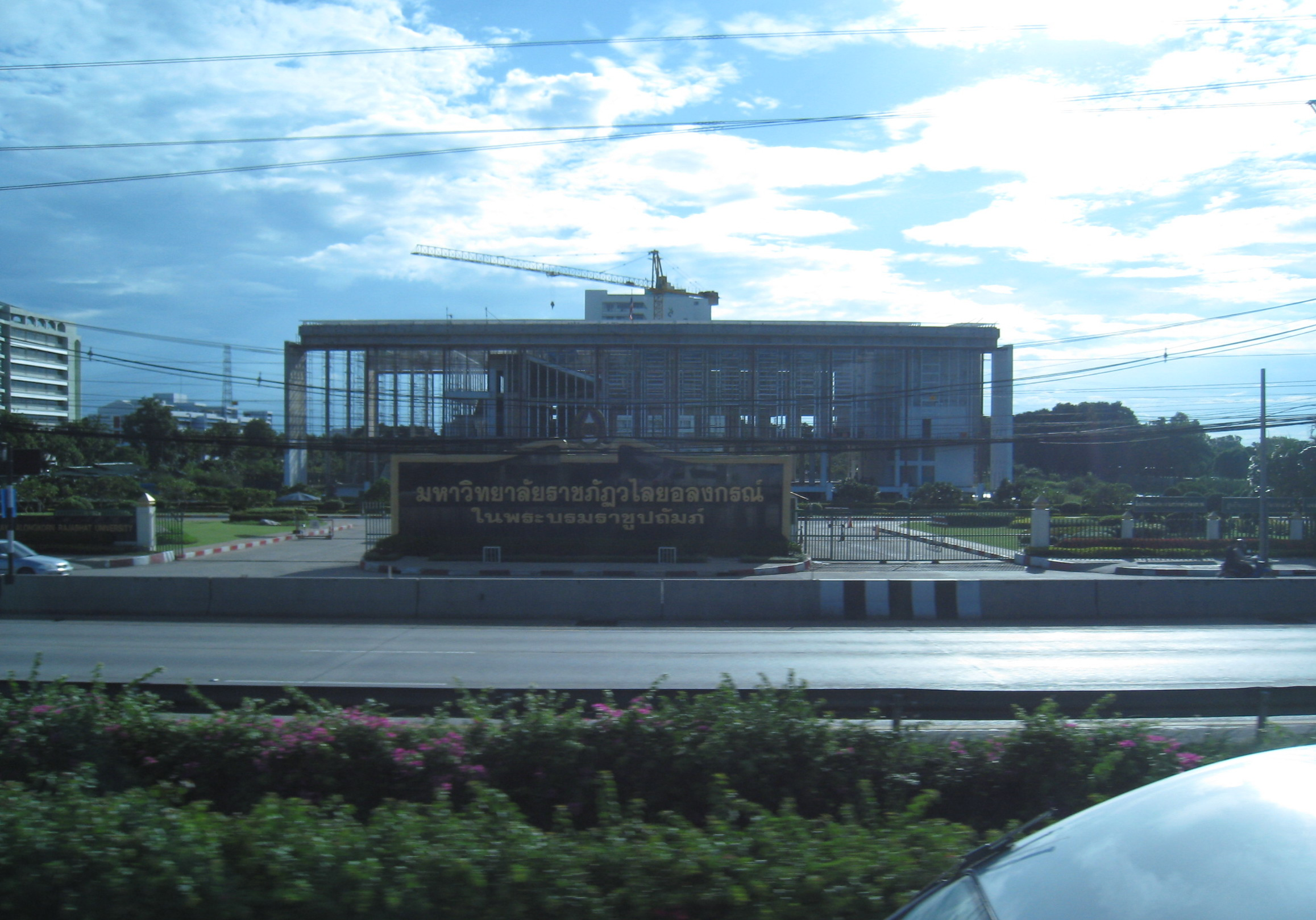
Valaya Alongkorn Rajabhat University

Princess Alongkorn put a lot of importance on the education of Thai women. She was the patron of Rajini School, and established the other all-girls school, Rajini Bon School. She gave her own money to the Ministry of Education to build Vittayalongkorn Educational College (later Valaya Alongkorn Rajabhat University, Pathum Thani Province).

She was close to her half-brother King Vajiravudh who succeeded to the throne after Chulalongkorn. Because of her excellent command of the English language she played a key role in the welcoming of many foreign guests, including foreign royalty, to the new king's coronation ceremony in 1911.

On 11 November 1911, King Vajiravudh gave her the royal title of "The Princess of Bejraburi" (Krom Luang Bejraburi Rajasirindhorn (Thai: กรมหลวงเพชรบุรีราชสิรินธร)). She was given the rank of Krom Luang, the 3rd level of the Krom ranks.

When King Vajiravudh died in 1925, his younger brother, Prajadhipok succeeded to the throne. He asked the princess to design the dress of his wife Princess Rambai Barni for the coronation ceremony as the new queen. The dress she designed was in European style and made Queen Rambai Barni the biggest attraction in the ceremony.

== Later life ==
Princess Valaya Alongkorn with her mother, Queen Sri Savarindira and Prince Mahidol Adulyadej

After the death of Saovabha Phongsri on 20 October 1919 she moved from the Phayathai Palace to the Suan Sunandha Royal Villa, in the compound of Dusit Palace. One year later, she contracted a lung disease. She received treatment in Europe, and then moved to live in Srapathum Palace with her birth mother Savang Vadhana. She continued to have treatment for her illness until her death. She finally died on 15 February 1938 from lung cancer, at the age of 53.

Her body was laid in the Dusit Maha Prasat Throne Hall, Grand Palace. At the time, the government did not have enough money to build her Royal Crematorium in Sanam Luang. So King Ananda Mahidol (her nephew) and Savang Vadhana had to contribute funds from their own treasuries, supplemented by the government for the crematorium. The Royal Cremation ceremony took place on 14 May 1941. Queen Sri Savarindira was represented by King Ananda Mahidol, who performed all the royal cremation rites with other members of the Royal family.

Later, King Anada Mahidol posthumously change her royal status from Somdet Phra Chao Boromwongse Ther to Somdet Phra Ratcha Pitucha (literally: "the Princess Aunt") as a mark of personal distinction.

== Honours ==
- Dame of The Ancient and Auspicious Order of the Nine Gems
- Dame of The Most Illustrious Order of the Royal House of Chakri: received 7 February 1893
- Dame Cross of the Most Illustrious Order of Chula Chom Klao (First class): received 26 November 1893
- King Rama V Royal Cypher Medal
- King Rama VI Royal Cypher Medal
- King Rama VII Royal Cypher Medal
- King Rama VIII Royal Cypher Medal

== See also ==
- King Ananda Mahidol
