= Order of the Nine Gems =

Thailand order

The Ancient and Auspicious Order of the Nine Gems เครื่องราชอิสริยาภรณ์อันเป็นโบราณมงคลนพรัตนราชวราภรณ์
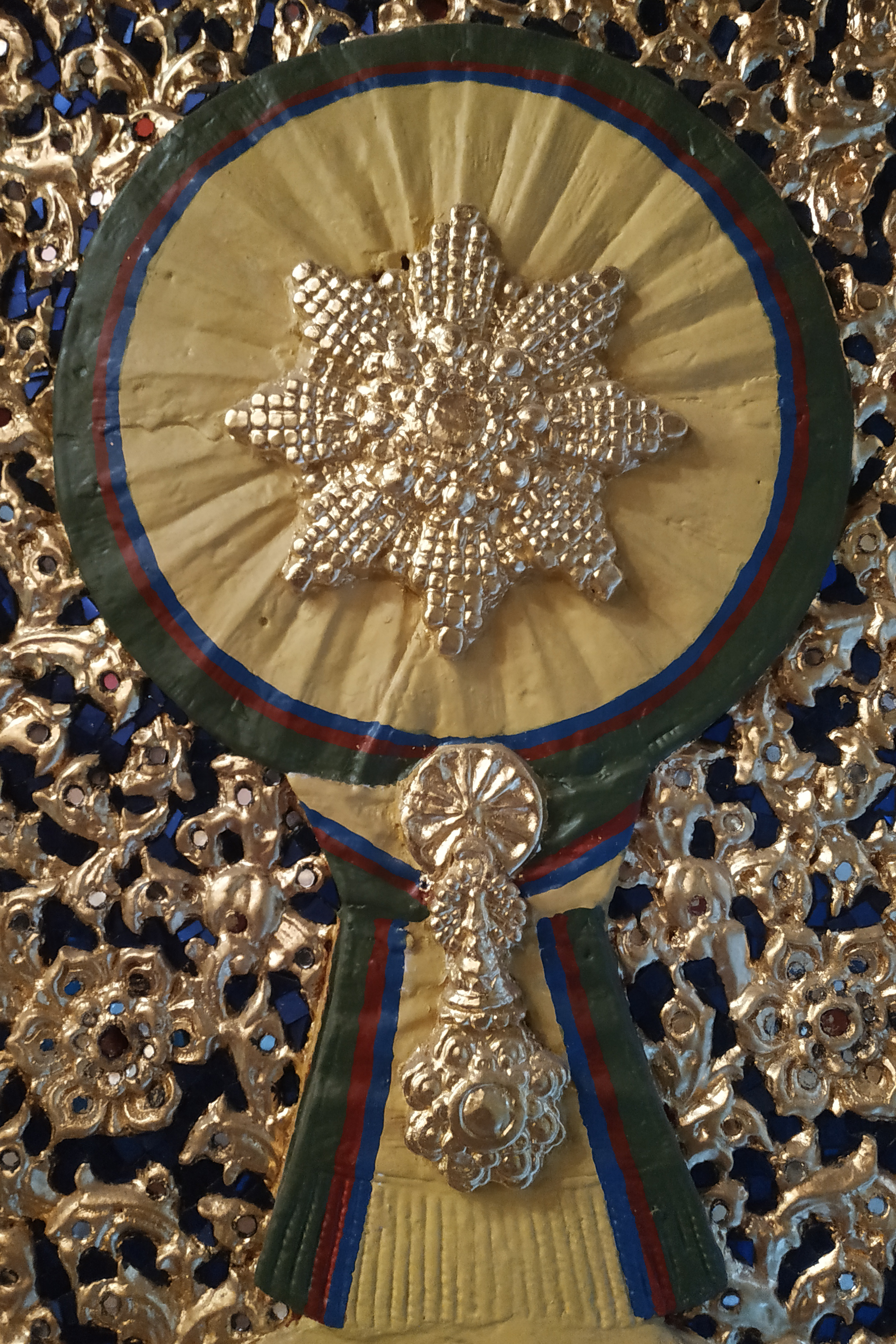
- Woodcarving of the Order of the Nine Gems at Wat Ratchabophit, Bangkok.

Awarded by the King of Thailand
- Type: Chivalric order
- Established: 1861; 165 years ago
- Religious affiliation: Buddhism
- Seat: 27
- Eligibility: Royal Family and Lay Buddhists
- Criteria: At the monarch's pleasure
- Status: Currently constituted
- Founder: Mongkut
- Sovereign: Vajiralongkorn
- Grades: Knight/Dame

Statistics
- First induction: 1861
- Last induction: 28 July 2019
- Total inductees: 73

Precedence
- Next (higher): Order of the Royal House of Chakri
- Next (lower): Order of Chula Chom Klao
- Ribbon bar of the Order of the Nine Gems

The Ancient and Auspicious Order of the Nine Gems (Thai: เครื่องราชอิสริยาภรณ์อันเป็นโบราณมงคลนพรัตนราชวราภรณ์; RTGS: Khrueang Ratcha-itsariyaphon An Pen Borannamongkhon Noppharat Ratchawaraphon) was established in 1861 by King Mongkut (Rama IV) of the Kingdom of Siam (now Thailand). The order is bestowed upon the members of the Thai royal family and distinguished high-ranking officials who have given service to the kingdom and who are active Buddhist laypeople. In practice, it is the highest Thai order granted to Thai citizens, as the two higher orders are reserved for royalty or foreign heads of state. Members of the order are entitled to use the postnominals น.ร.

== History ==
The order is based on the model of European orders of chivalry and merit. The nine gems are the Thai form of the original Hindu royal amulet known as the navaratna and in its original form consisted of a ring of gold bearing the nine gems awarded to a Thai general after he won an important military victory and is also part of the royal insignia given the Thai king at his coronation. This ring still is part of the insignia of the order and worn by the male members of the order. The nine precious stones of the royal amulet constitute an integral part of both the badge and the star of the order.

The nine gems and the corresponding benefits that they bestow on their bearers are:

- Diamond—Power, wealth, success over enemies
- Ruby—Success and longevity
- Emerald—Strength and security
- Yellow Sapphire—Charm and love
- Garnet—Health and longevity
- Blue Sapphire—Love and wealth
- Pearl/Moonstone—Purity, happiness, and success over enemies
- Zircon/Topaz—Wealth and success in legal affairs
- Cat's Eye—Protection by spirits, and from fire

== Insignia ==
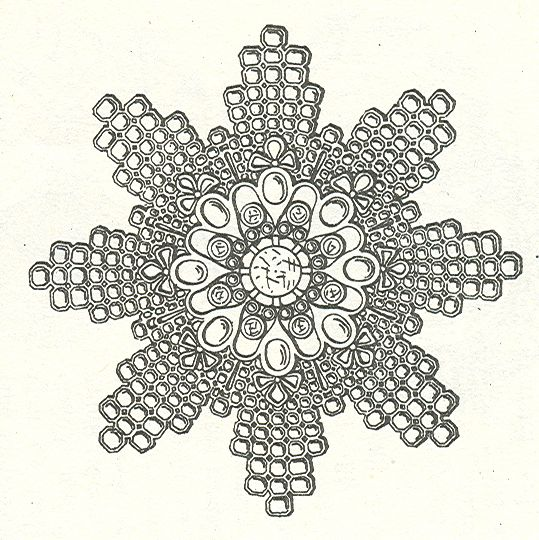
Order of the Nine Gems (Breast Star)

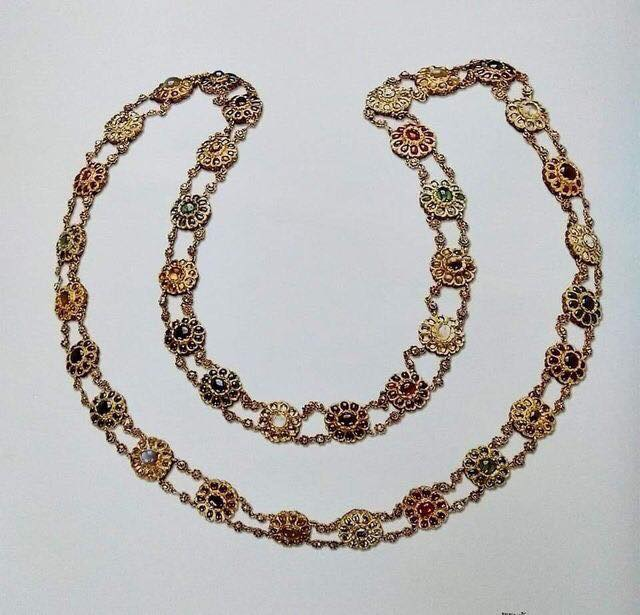
Insignia of the Sovereign Grand Master of the Order of the Nine Gems

The decoration consists of a single class (knight). The insignia are:

- Pendant of the Nine Gems (Navaratna), on a yellow sash with red, blue, and green trim, worn over the right shoulder to the left hip (for men). For women, the Pendant of the Nine Gems is attached to a silk ribbon, worn on the front left shoulder.
- Star of the Nine Gems, to wear on the left breast.
- Gold Ring of the Nine Gems, for men, to wear on the right index finger.
- The Sovereign Grand Master of the Order is Knight but added the Chain of the Nine Gems sash above to wear over the right shoulder to the left hip above sash badge and the star is decorated with diamonds.

== List of Sovereigns ==
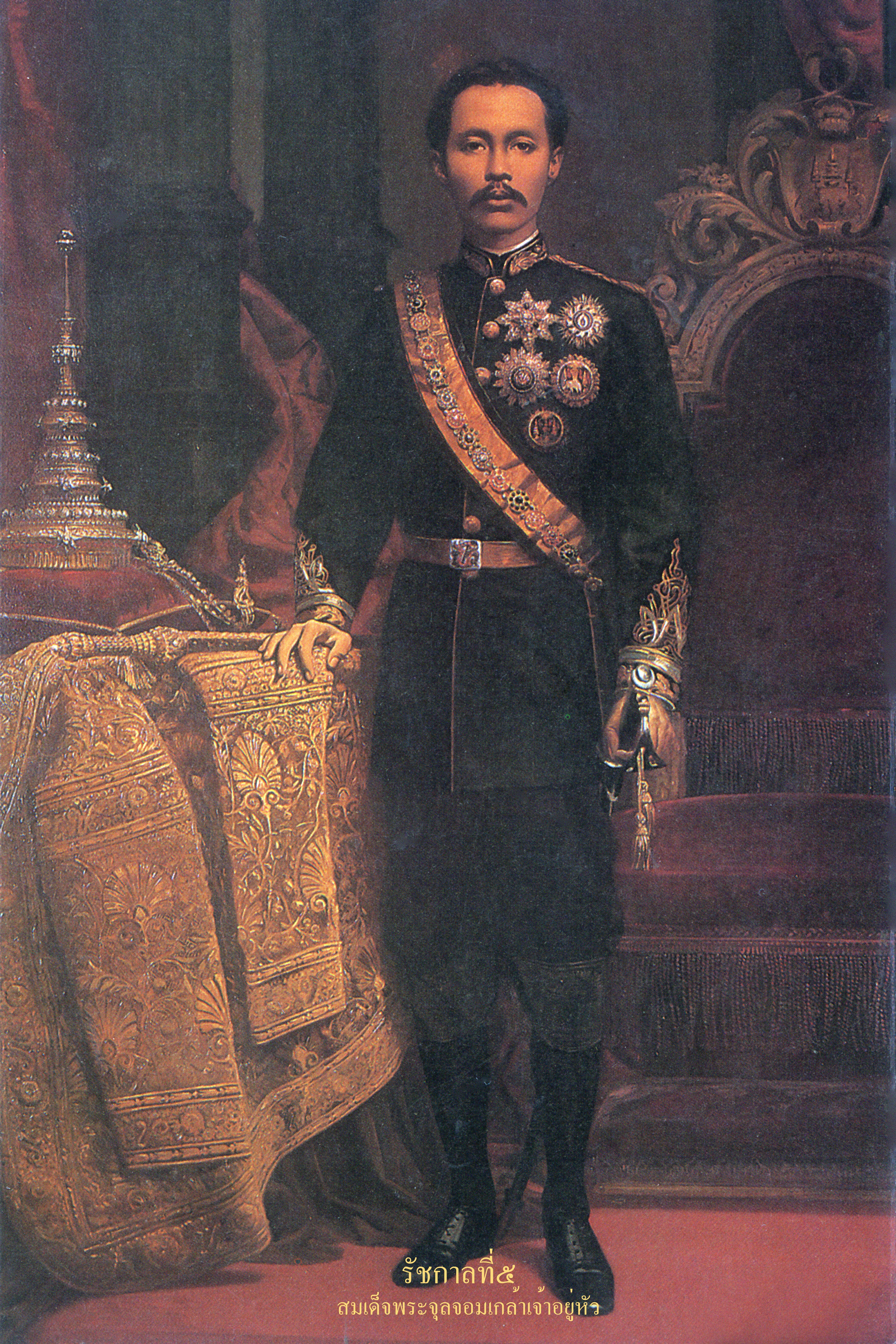
King Chulalongkorn wearing the sash from his right shoulder, with chain of the nine gems over it and star on the left breast.

Years	Name
1851–1868	King Mongkut (Rama IV)
1868–1910	King Chulalongkorn (Rama V)
1910–1925	King Vajiravudh (Rama VI)
1925–1935	King Prajadhipok (Rama VII)
1935–1946	King Ananda Mahidol (Rama VIII)
1946–2016	King Bhumibol Adulyadej (Rama IX)
2016–present	King Vajiralongkorn (Rama X)

== List of recipients ==
Highlights indicate living members

=== Royal Knights ===
Year	Name	Appointed by	Ref.
1851	King Pinklao	Rama IV	
1851	Prince Wongsa Dhiraj Snid	Rama IV	
1851	Prince Mahesuan Siwawilat	Rama IV	
1851	Prince Witsanunat Niphathon	Rama IV	
1851	Emperor Napoleon III	Rama IV	
1869	Prince Wichaichan	Rama V	
1869	Prince Deves Wacharindra	Rama V	
1869	Prince Bamrab Porapak	Rama V	
1869	Prince Chaturonrasmi	Rama V	
1869	Prince Bhanurangsi Savangwongse	Rama V	
1879	Prince Vorasakda Phisan	Rama V	
1886	Crown Prince Maha Vajirunhis	Rama V	
1886	Prince Devawongse Varoprakar	Rama V	
1893	Prince Bodin Phaisansophon	Rama V	
1893	Prince Naresr Varariddhi	Rama V	
1893	Prince Narisara Nuwattiwong	Rama V	
1894	Prince Gagananga Yukala	Rama V	
1894	Prince Paribatra Sukhumbandhu	Rama V	
1894	Prince Sommatiwongse Varodaya	Rama V	
1894	Prince Chakrabongse Bhuvanath	Rama V	
1894	Prince Yugala Dighambara	Rama V	
1895	Emperor Guangxu of Qing	Rama V	
1901	Prince Asdang Dejavudh	Rama V	
1901	Prince Damrong Rajanubhab	Rama V	
	Prince Sawang Chakrabandh	Rama V	
1911	Prince Mahidol Adulyadej	Rama VI	
1911	Prince Chudadhuj Dharadilok	Rama VI	
1911	Prince Thongthaem Thavalyawongse	Rama VI	
1911	Prince Sawasdiprawat	Rama VI	
1911	Prince Kitiyakara Voralaksana	Rama VI	
1911	Prince Pravitra Vadhanodom	Rama VI	
1911	Prince Chirapravati Voradej	Rama VI	
1912	Prince Chumphon Somphot	Rama VI	
1912	Prince Raphi Phatthanasak	Rama VI	
1913	Prince Svasti Sobhana	Rama VI	
1914	Prince Sukhasawasdee	Rama VI	
1914	Prince Kashemsanta Sobhaga	Rama VI	
1920	Prince Abhakara Kiartivongse	Rama VI	
1920	Prince Narathip Praphanphong	Rama VI	
1922	Prince Purachatra Jayakara	Rama VI	
1931	Prince Vudhijaya Chalermlabha	Rama VII	
1941	Prince Aditya Dibabha	Rama VIII	
1950	Prince Rangsit Prayurasakdi	Rama IX	
1973	Crown Prince Maha Vajiralongkorn (later King Rama X)	Rama IX	

=== Royal Dames ===
Year	Name	Appointed by	Ref.
1879	Queen Sunanda Kumariratana	Rama V	
1893	Queen Savang Vadhana	Rama V	
	Queen Saovabha Phongsri	Rama V	
	Queen Sukhumala Marasri	Rama V	
1903	Princess Suddha Dibyaratana	Rama V	
1905	Princess Yaovamalaya Narumala	Rama V	
	Princess consort Saisavali Bhiromya	Rama V	
1911	Princess Valaya Alongkorn	Rama VI	
1920	Princess Malini Nobhadara	Rama VI	
	Princess Nibha Nobhadol	Rama VI	
1922	Queen Indrasakdi Sachi (later degraded to princess consort)	Rama VI	
1925	Queen Rambai Barni	Rama VII	
1926	Princess Somavadi	Rama VII	
1931	Princess Nabhabhorn Prabha	Rama VII	
1950	Queen Sirikit	Rama IX	
1961	Princess mother Srinagarindra	Rama IX	
1977	Princess Sirindhorn	Rama IX	
1983	Princess Galyani Vadhana	Rama IX	
1993	Princess Chulabhorn	Rama IX	
2019	Queen Suthida	Rama X	
2019	Princess Soamsawali	Rama X	
2019	Princess Bajrakitiyabha	Rama X	

=== Knights ===
Year	Name	Appointed by	Ref.
1869	Sri Suriwongse (Chuang Bunnag)	Rama V	
1886	Surawongwaiwat (Worn Bunnag)	Rama V	
1920	Bodindechanuchit (Arun Chatrakul)	Rama VI	
1924	Yommaraj (Pan Sukhum)	Rama VI	
1941	Phichayendrayodhin (Um Indrayodhin)	Rama VIII	
1941	Plaek Phibunsongkhram	Rama VIII	
1945	Pridi Banomyong	Rama VIII	
1959	Sarit Thanarat	Rama IX	
1988	Prem Tinsulanonda	Rama IX	
1996	Sanya Dharmasakti	Rama IX	

=== Living recipients of the order ===
Rama IX (1946–2016)
Image	Name	Date	Present age	Notes	Ref.
	HM King Maha Vajiralongkorn RMBh MChK NR PChW SR	16 January 1973	74	Sovereign of the order since 13 October 2016.	
	HRH Princess Maha Chakri Sirindhorn, the Princess Royal MChK NR PCh MPCh MVM	5 December 1977	71		
	HRH Princess Chulabhorn Walailak, the Princess Srisavangavadhana MChK NR PCh MPCh MVM	16 June 1993	69		
Rama X (2016–present)
Image	Name	Date	Present age	Notes	Ref.
	HM Queen Suthida MChK NR PCh MPCh MVM	4 May 2019	48		
	HRH Princess Soamsawali, the Princess Suddhanarinatha MChK NR PCh MPCh MVM	5 May 2019	69		
