= Savang Vadhana =

Queen of Thailand from 1881 to 1910

Savang Vadhana; สว่างวัฒนา
- Queen Grandmother of Thailand; Queen Sri Savarindira
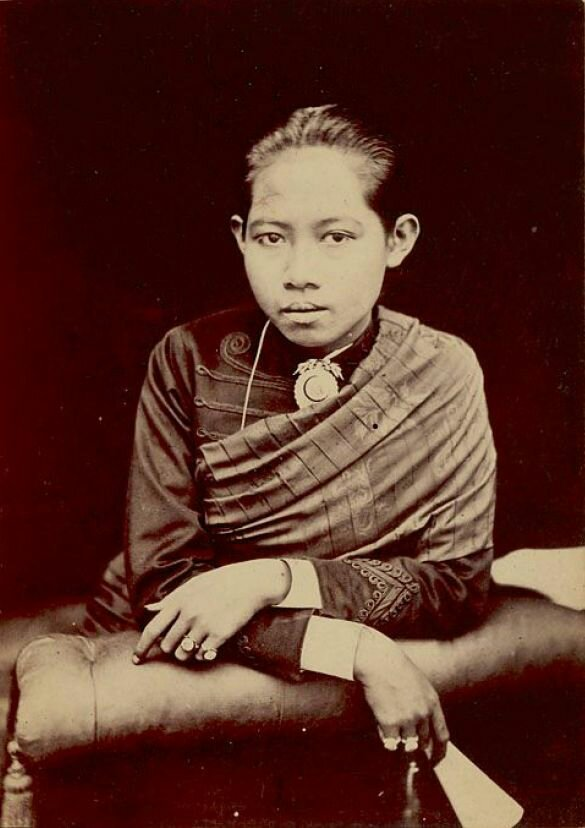
- Formal portrait, c. 1879

Queen consort of Siam
- Tenure: 17 February 1881 – 23 October 1910
- Born: 10 September 1862; Bangkok, Siam
- Died: 17 December 1955 (aged 93); Bangkok, Thailand
- Burial: 22 April 1956; Wat Ratchabophit
- Spouse: Chulalongkorn (Rama V)
- Issue Detail: Maha Vajirunhis; Isariyalongkorn; Vichitra Chiraprabha; Sommatiwongse Varodaya; Valaya Alongkorn; Sirabhorn Sobhon; Mahidol Adulyadej
Names
- Somdet Phra Nang Chao Savang Vadhana Phra Boromma Rajadevi
- Dynasty: Chakri
- Father: Mongkut (Rama IV)
- Mother: Piam Sucharitakul

Royal wives of Chulalongkorn

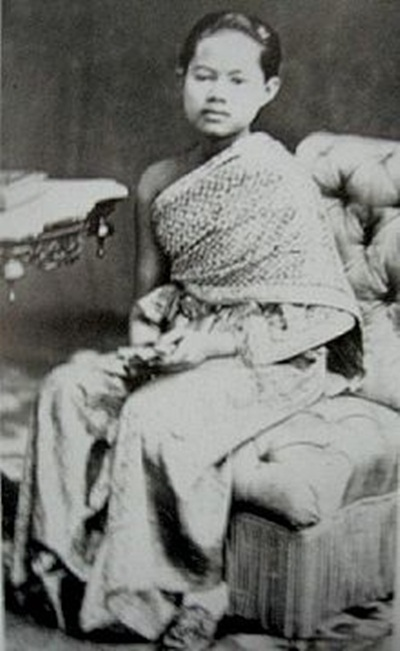
Sunanda Kumariratana

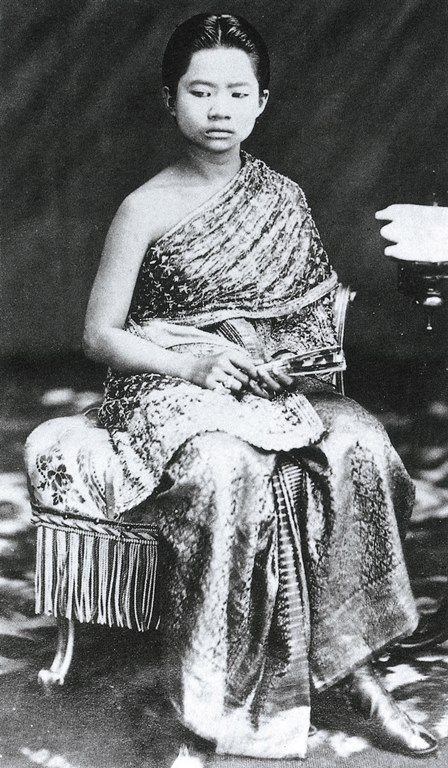
Sukhumala Marasri

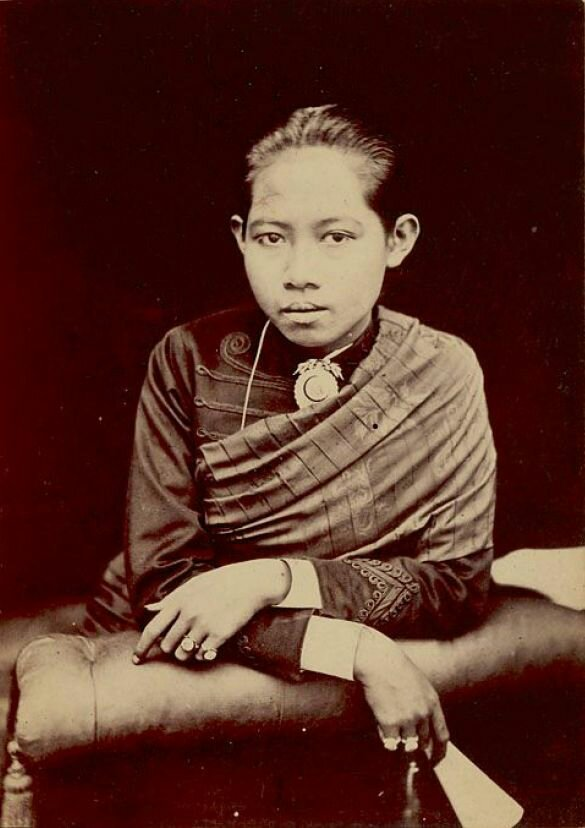
Savang Vadhana

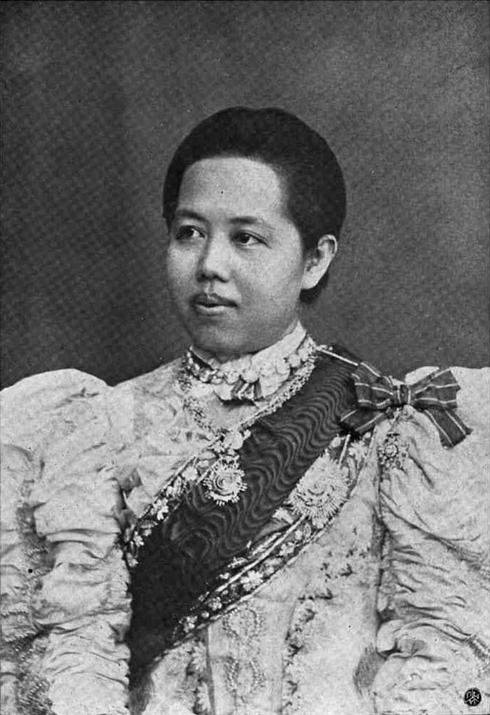
Saovabha Phongsri

Sri Savarindira (Note: Thai: ศรีสวรินทิรา; RTGS: Si Sawarinthira) (10 September 1862 – 17 December 1955), also known as Savang Vadhana (Note: Thai: สว่างวัฒนา; RTGS: Sawang Watthana), was a half-sister and queen consort of King Chulalongkorn (Rama V). After her first grandson's accession to power in 1935, she became known as Queen Sri Savarindira, the Queen Grandmother of Thailand (title in Thai is Somdetch Phra Phan Vassa Ayika Chao (Note: สมเด็จพระพันวัสสาอัยยิกาเจ้า; RTGS: Somdet Phra Phan Watsa Ai-yika Chao; "the Queen Grandmother")). Her children died before her and she lived to see her grandsons Ananda Mahidol and Bhumibol Adulyadej take the throne.

== Life ==
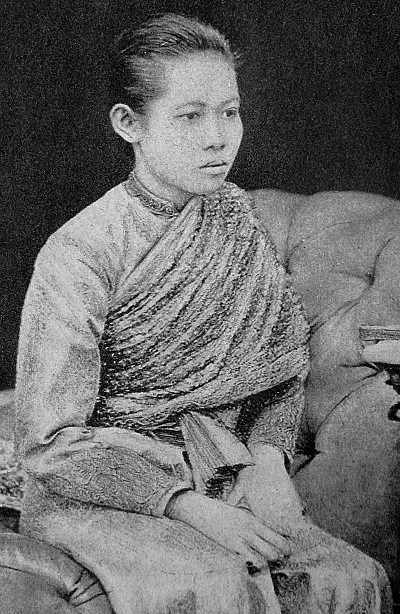
Savang Vadhana in 1879

She was the 27th daughter of King Rama IV (King Mongkut or Rama IV) and Princess Consort Piam and thus her husband's half-sister. Her marriage to Chulalongkorn produced the following children:

- Crown Prince Maha Vajirunhis (27 June 1878 – 4 January 1894)
- Prince Isariyalongkorn (4 September 1879 – 25 September 1879)
- Princess Vichitra Chiraprabha (21 April 1881 – 15 August 1881)
- Prince Sommatiwongse Varodaya, the Prince of Sri Dharmaraj (9 June 1882 – 17 June 1899)
- Princess Valaya Alongkorn, the Princess of Phetchaburi (16 April 1884 – 15 February 1938)
  - After the death of Princess Valaya Alongkorn, Momchao Phichitjirabha Devakula asked Queen Savang Vadhana whether she would attend the funeral. Having lost most of her children by this point, the queen replied: "อ๋อ ไปส่งให้หมด พอกันที ไม่เคยไปเลยจนคนเดียว คนนี้ต้องไป หมดกันที" translated as: "I sent them all off, but never attended any. This time I'll go. No one is left." The context is that mother would not attend her own child's cremation because it was a bad omen and meant that she'd have to attend all her other children's cremation before her own. This means that when she said she will go, it was her last child's funeral.
- Princess Sirabhorn Sobhon (19 July 1888 – 24 May 1898)
- Prince Mahidol Adulyadej, the Prince of Songkla, (posthumously The Prince Father of Thailand; 1 January 1892 – 24 September 1929), father of Princess Galyani Vadhana, King Rama VIII, and King Rama IX
- Unnamed princess (9 November 1893 – 12 November 1893)

In addition, the queen also adopted several of her husband's children and raised them as her own children:

- Yaovabha Bongsanid (28 August 1884 – 13 June 1934), first child of Chao Chom Manda Mom Rajawongse Nueng Sanidvongs
- Prabha Bannabilaya (13 August 1885 – 8 September 1948), first child of Chao Chom Manda Phrom
- Rangsit Prayurasakdi, the Prince of Chainat (12 November 1885 – 7 March 1951), second child of Chao Chom Manda Mom Rajawongse Nueng Sanidvongs, later served briefly as Regent of Siam for his nephew King Bhumibol Adulyadej
- Vapi Busbakara (25 June 1891 – 15 December 1982), fourth child of Chao Chom Manda Phrom

All of her biological children predeceased her, including two of her sons first in line to the throne, Vajirunhis and Mahidol.

When King Prajadhipok (Rama VII) abdicated in 1935, the son of Queen Savang Vadhana's youngest son, Prince Ananda Mahidol, acceded to the throne as King Ananda Mahidol (Rama VIII). She received the title of Queen Grandmother, having been renamed Sri Savarindira by King Prajadhipok while she was Queen Aunt.

Queen Sri Savarindira was also the grandmother of King Bhumibol Adulyadej (Rama IX). She lived long enough to see two of her grandsons become king.

The Queen also helped establish a hospital in Si Racha District, Chonburi Province, known today as Queen Savang Vadhana Memorial Hospital, operated by the Thai Red Cross Society.

== Death ==
She resided in later years at Sa Pathum Palace, currently located behind Siam Paragon center in downtown Bangkok. The Queen Savang Vadhana Museum is dedicated to her which is located in the Tamnak Yai Mansion (Grand mansion) inside Sa Pathum Palace. She died on 17 December 1955, at the age of 93. Her ashes were interred in the Royal Cemetery at Wat Ratchabophit, Bangkok. A residence of the queen can be seen at the Bang Pa-In Royal Palace. Her state funeral was the first to be covered briefly on television by the young Television of Thailand channel.

Queen Savang Vadhana Foundation was founded on 27 October 2005 under the aegis of Princess Maha Chakri Sirindhorn, her great-granddaughter.

== Title, styles, honours and awards ==
Styles of Queen Sri Savarindira, the Queen Grandmother of Thailand
- Reference style: Her Majesty
- Spoken style: Your Majesty

=== Styles ===
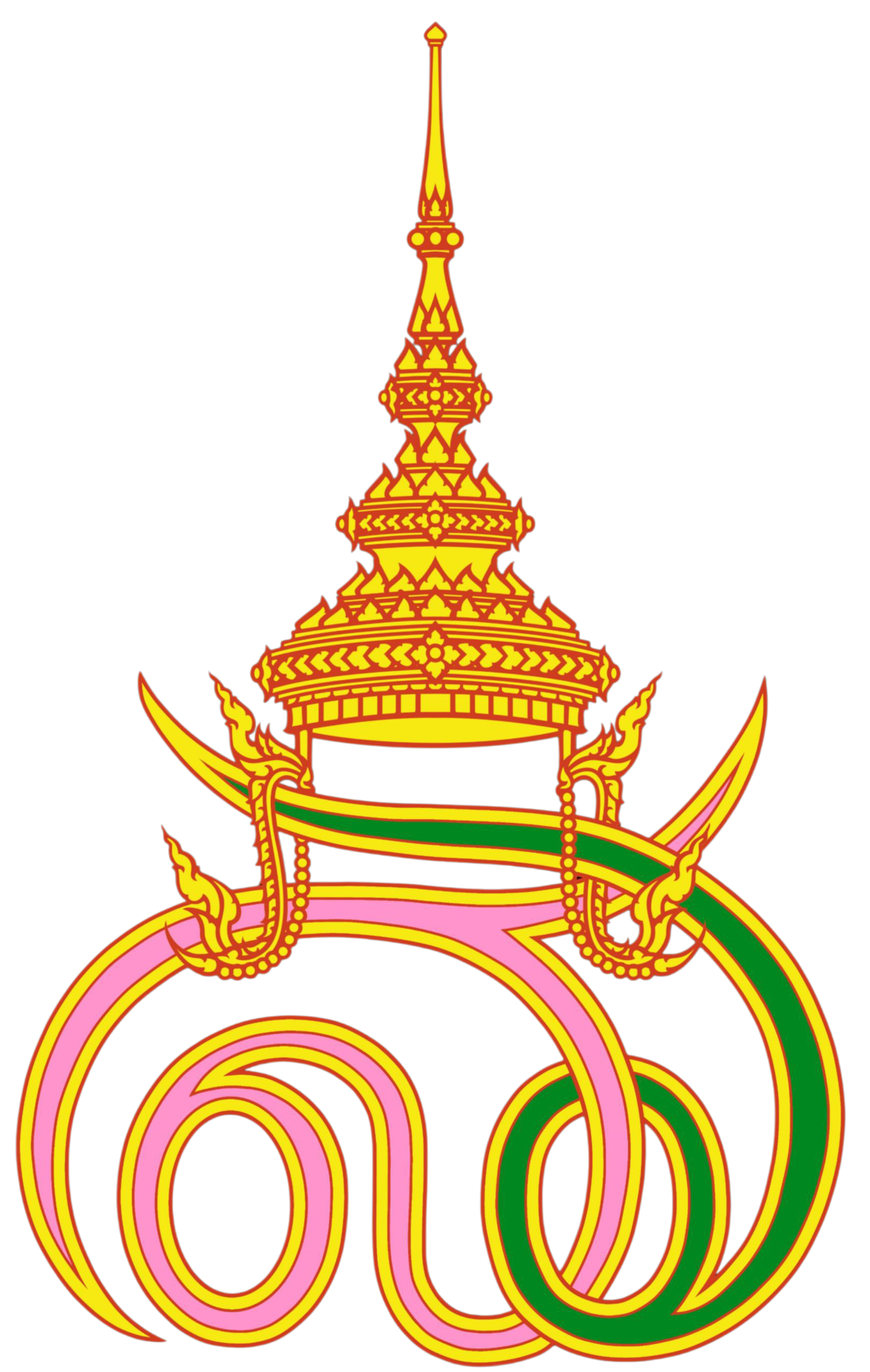
Royal monogram of Savang Vadhana

- 10 September 1862 – 1868 : Her Royal Highness Princess Savang Vadhana
  - (Thai: พระเจ้าลูกเธอ พระองค์เจ้าสว่างวัฒนา; Phra Chao Luk Thoe Phra Ong Chao Savang Vadhana)
- 1868 – 1878 : Her Royal Highness Princess Savang Vadhana (The king's sister)
  - (Thai: พระเจ้าน้องนางเธอ พระองค์เจ้าสว่างวัฒนา; Phra Chao Nong Nang Thoe Phra Ong Chao Savang Vadhana)
- 1878 – 12 August 1880 : Her Royal Highness Princess Savang Vadhana, The Royal Consort
  - (Thai: พระนางเจ้าสว่างวัฒนา พระราชเทวี; Phra Nang Chao Savang Vadhana Phra Rajadevi)
- 12 August 1880 – 17 February 1881 : Her Royal Highness Princess Savang Vadhana, The Princess Consort
  - (Thai: สมเด็จพระนางเจ้าสว่างวัฒนา พระราชเทวี; Somdet Phra Nang Chao Savang Vadhana Phra Rajadevi)
- 17 February 1881 – 1920 : Her Majesty Queen Savang Vadhana
  - (Thai: สมเด็จพระนางเจ้าสว่างวัฒนา พระบรมราชเทวี; Somdet Phra Nang Chao Savang Vadhana Phra Borommarajadevi)
- 1920 – 21 March 1925 : Her Majesty Queen Savang Vadhana, The Queen Aunt
  - (Thai: สมเด็จพระมาตุจฉาเจ้าสว่างวัฒนา พระบรมราชเทวี; Somdet Phra Matuccha Chao Savang Vadhana Phra Borommarajadevi)
- 21 March 1925 – 25 March 1934 : Her Majesty Queen Sri Savarindira, The Queen Aunt
  - (Thai: สมเด็จพระศรีสวรินทิราบรมราชเทวี พระพันวัสสามาตุจฉาเจ้า; Somdet Phra Sri Savarindira Borommarajadevi Phra Phan Vassa Matuccha Chao)
- 25 March 1934 – 17 December 1955 : Her Majesty Queen Sri Savarindira, The Queen Grandmother of Thailand
  - (Thai: สมเด็จพระศรีสวรินทิราบรมราชเทวี พระพันวัสสาอัยยิกาเจ้า; Somdet Phra Sri Savarindira Borommarajadevi Phra Phan Vassa Ayika Chao)

=== Honours ===
- The Most Illustrious Order of the Royal House of Chakri
- The Ancient and Auspicious of Order of the Nine Gems
- Dame Grand Cross (First Class) of The Most Illustrious Order of Chula Chom Klao
- Dame of the Ratana Varabhorn Order of Merit
- Dame Grand Cordon (Special Class) of The Most Noble Order of the Crown of Thailand
- King Rama IV Royal Cypher Medal (Second Class)
- King Rama V Royal Cypher Medal (First Class)
- King Rama VI Royal Cypher Medal (First Class)
- King Rama VII Royal Cypher Medal (First Class)
- King Rama VIII Royal Cypher Medal (First Class)
- King Rama IX Royal Cypher Medal (First Class)

== Issue ==
Name	Birth	Death	Marriage		Children
Name	Birth	Death	Date	Spouse	Children
Crown Prince Maha Vajirunhis	27 June 1878	4 January 1895	None		
Prince Isariyalongkorn	4 September 1879	25 September 1879	None		
Princess Vichitra Chiraprabha	21 April 1881	15 August 1881	None		
Sommatiwongse Varodaya, Prince of Nakhonsridharmaraj	9 June 1882	17 June 1899	None		
Valaya Alongkorn, Princess of Bejraburi	16 April 1884	15 February 1938	None		
Princess Sirabhorn Sobhon	19 July 1888	24 May 1898	None		
Miscarriage	30 March 1889		None		
Miscarriage	1890		None		
Mahidol Adulyadej, Prince of Songkla (later Prince Father)	1 January 1892	24 September 1929	10 October 1920	Sangwan Talapat	Galyani Vadhana, Princess of Naradhiwas; Ananda Mahidol; Bhumibol Adulyadej
Princess (Unnamed)	9 November 1893	12 November 1893	None		

== See also ==
- King Ananda Mahidol
- King Bhumibol Adulyadej

== Notes ==
Sri Savarindira House of Chakri Born: 10 September 1862 Died: 17 December 1955
Non-profit organization positions
Vacant Title last held by Saovabha Phongsri	President of Thai Red Cross Society; 1920–1955	Vacant Title next held by Sirikit Kitiyakara
Honorary titles
Preceded by The Prince Damrong Rajanubhab	Eldest Royal Member of the Chakri Dynasty; 1936–1955	Succeeded by The Princess Dibayaratana Kiritkulini
