= Mahidol (disambiguation) =

Mahidol usually refers to Prince Mahidol Adulyadej of Songkla or simply Mahidol Adulyadej, father of King Bhumibol Adulyadej of Thailand. The name may also refer to:

- Mahidol as the surname used by members of Prince Mahidol's line of the Thai royal family
- Mahidol University, a university in Bangkok, Thailand
