= Order of the Rajamitrabhorn =

Order of chivalry of Thailand

The Most Auspicious Order of the Rajamitrabhorn เครื่องราชอิสริยาภรณ์อันเป็นมงคลยิ่งราชมิตราภรณ์

Awarded by the King of Thailand
- Type: Relationships order
- Established: 12 June 1962; 64 years ago
- Eligibility: Foreign Heads of State
- Awarded for: Prosperous relations with foreign countries.
- Status: Currently constituted
- Founder: Bhumibol Adulyadej
- Sovereign: Vajiralongkorn
- Grades: Knight/Dame

Statistics
- First induction: 20 June 1962
- Last induction: 9 March 2009
- Total inductees: 33

Precedence
- Next (higher): None (highest)
- Next (lower): Order of the Royal House of Chakri
- Ribbon bar of the Order of the Rajamitrabhorn

The Most Auspicious Order of the Rajamitrabhorn (Thai: เครื่องราชอิสริยาภรณ์อันเป็นมงคลยิ่งราชมิตราภรณ์; RTGS: Khrueang Ratcha-itsariyaphon An Pen Mongkhon Ying Ratchamittraphon) is the highest royal order of Thailand. It was founded on 11 June 1962 by King Bhumibol Adulyadej (Rama IX) to be bestowed upon foreign heads of state. Members of the order are entitled to use the postnominals ร.ม.ภ.

"Rajamitrabhorn" meaning Friendship with the King.

== Insignia ==
The decoration consists of a single class (Knight). The insignia for this class is:

- Collar with a diamond pendant, with the Chakra crossed over the Trident, at the centre.
- Small pendant, attached onto the yellow sash, with white and blue trims, to wear over the right shoulder to the left hip.
- Star with the figure of Narayana on the Garuda, to wear on the left breast.
- The Sovereign Grand Master of the Order is a Knight, but his star is larger and decorated with diamonds.

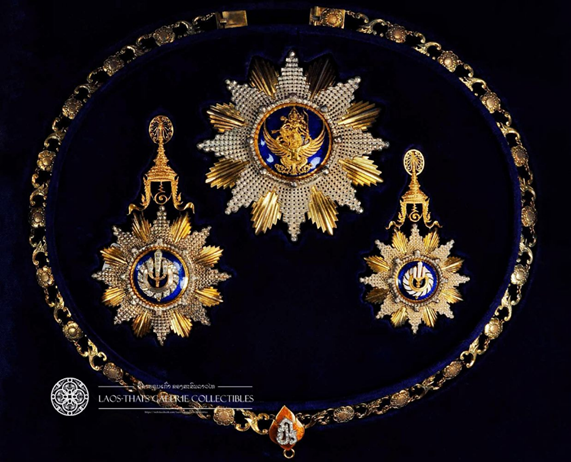
A set of the Order of the Rajamitrabhorn

== Recipients ==
Name	Nationality	Known for	Date of appointment	Ref.
Putra of Perlis	Malaya	Yang di-Pertuan Agong of Malaysia	20 June 1962	
Heinrich Lübke	West Germany	President of West Germany	21 November 1962	
Ne Win	Burma	Chairman of the Union Revolutionary Council	14 December 1962	
Paul of Greece	Greece	King of Greece	14 February 1963	
Savang Vatthana	Laos	King of Laos	22 March 1963	
Emperor Shōwa	Japan	Emperor of Japan	27 May 1963	
Chiang Kai-shek	Republic of China	President of the Republic of China	5 June 1963	
Diosdado Macapagal	Philippines	President of the Philippines	9 July 1963	
Juliana of the Netherlands	Netherlands	Queen of Netherlands	15 October 1963	
Baudouin of Belgium	Belgium	King of the Belgians	3 February 1964	
Adolf Schärf	Austria	President of Austria	29 September 1964	
Olav V of Norway	Norway	King of Norway	15 January 1965	
Park Chung-hee	South Korea	President of South Korea	10 February 1966	
Franz Jonas	Austria	President of Austria	17 January 1967	
Ferdinand Marcos	Philippines	President of the Philippines	15 January 1968	
Mohammad Reza Pahlavi	Iran	Shah of Iran	22 January 1968	
Soeharto	Indonesia	President of Indonesia	19 March 1970	
Abdul Halim of Kedah	Malaysia	Yang di-Pertuan Agong of Malaysia	1 February 1973	
Chun Doo-hwan	South Korea	President of South Korea	3 July 1981	
Karl Carstens	West Germany	President of West Germany	29 February 1984	
Iskandar of Johor	Malaysia	Yang di-Pertuan Agong of Malaysia	17 December 1985	
Birendra of Nepal	Nepal	King of Nepal	2 May 1986	
Muhammad Zia-ul-Haq	Pakistan	President of Pakistan	28 October 1987	
Juan Carlos I of Spain	Spain	King of Spain	15 November 1987	
Hassanal Bolkiah	Brunei	Sultan of Brunei	31 October 1988	
Azlan Shah of Perak	Malaysia	Yang di-Pertuan Agong of Malaysia	15 December 1990	
Akihito of Japan	Japan	Emperor of Japan	21 September 1991	
Kaysone Phomvihane	Laos	President of Laos	27 December 1991	
Salahuddin of Selangor	Malaysia	Yang di-Pertuan Agong of Malaysia	24 March 2001	
Margrethe II of Denmark	Denmark	Queen of Denmark	3 February 2002	
Carl XVI Gustaf of Sweden	Sweden	King of Sweden	23 February 2003	
Beatrix of the Netherlands	Netherlands	Queen of Netherlands	26 December 2003	
Mizan Zainal Abidin of Terengganu	Malaysia	Yang di-Pertuan Agong of Malaysia	9 March 2009	

=== Living recipients of the order ===
Rama IX (1962–2016)
Image	Name	Country	Date	Present age	Notes	Ref.
	HM King Juan Carlos I of Spain RMBh MChK	Spain	15 November 1987	88	King Emeritus of Spain	
	HM Sultan Hassanal Bolkiah Muiz'zaddin Wad'daulah of Brunei Darussalam RMBh	Brunei	31 October 1988	80		
	HM Emperor Akihito of Japan RMBh MChK	Japan	21 September 1991	92	Emperor Emeritus of Japan	
	HM Queen Margrethe II of Denmark RMBh MChK	Denmark	3 February 2002	86	Former Queen of Denmark	
	HM King Carl XVI Gustaf of Sweden RMBh	Sweden	23 February 2003	80		
	HRH Princess Beatrix of the Netherlands RMBh MChK	Netherlands	26 December 2003	88	Former Queen of the Netherlands	
	HRH Sultan Mizan Zainal Abidin ibni Almarhum Sultan Mahmud Al-Muktafi Billah Shah of Terengganu RMBh	Malaysia	9 March 2009	64	Former Yang di-Pertuan Agong of Malaysia	
Rama X (2016–present)
Image	Name	Country	Date	Present age	Notes	Ref.
	HM King Maha Vajiralongkorn RMBh MChK NR PChW SR	Thailand	13 October 2016	74	Sovereign of the order	

== See also ==
- Orders, decorations, and medals of Thailand
