= Navaratna =

Group of nine gems

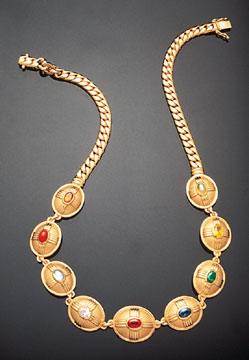
Thailand's "Queen Sirikit Navaratna" necklace.

Navaratna (Sanskrit: नवरत्न) is a Sanskrit compound word meaning "nine gems" or "ratnas". Jewellery created in this style has important cultural significance in many southern, and south-eastern Asian cultures as a symbol of wealth, and status, and is claimed to yield talismanic benefits towards health and well-being. The setting of the stones is believed to hold mystical powers tied to the astrology and mythology of Hinduism, Jainism, and Buddhism. The historic origin of the navaratna is tied to the astrological concept of "Navagrahas", or "nine celestial gods" (planets).

The stones are often set within gold or silver jewelry, with a ruby as the centerpiece representing the Sun. Each additional stone around the ruby then represents another celestial body within the Solar System, or a node, in addition to representing good fortune and the characteristics of various religious figures. For traditional purposes and the purported health benefits, the arrangement of the stones and their position on the body is of particular significance, as is the quality of the gemstones.

== Across languages and cultures ==
In each culture, the Navaratna largely reflects the same core concepts associated with the stones. Their arrangement is considered sacred in southern and southeastern Asia, including India, Nepal, Sri Lanka, Singapore, Myanmar, Cambodia, Vietnam, Indonesia, Thailand, and Malaysia, regardless of religious and cultural differences.

=== Translation ===
- Navaratnam in Sanskrit and Malayalam
- Navaratna in Hindi, Marathi, Sinhalese, Kannada, and Indonesian
- Nabaratna in Bengali and Odia
- Navaratinam in Tamil
- Navaratnalu in Telugu
- Nawaratna in Malay and Nepali
- Nawarat or Noppharat in Thai
- Nawarat in Burmese

=== Recognition in Thailand ===
In Thailand, the Navaratna is officially recognised as a national and royal symbol. A specific honour awarded by the king is called the "Noppharat Ratchawaraphon" (the Ancient Auspicious Order of the Nine Gems).

Ribbon of the Order

The decoration consists of a single class (Knight). The insignia is:

- Pendant of the Nine Gems, on a yellow sash with red, blue, and green trims, worn over the right shoulder of the left hip (for men). For women, the Pendant of the Nine Gems is attached to a silk ribbon, and worn on the front left shoulder.
- Star of the Nine Gems, to wear on the left chest
- Gold Ring of the Nine Gems, for men, to wear on the right ring finger.

== Gems and planets ==
Late Thai astrologer Horacharn Thep Sarikabutr has given the meaning of these nine gems in his Parichad-Jataka (chapter 2, verse 21, pages 35–36) translated as follows:

"Top quality and flawless ruby is the gem for the Sun, natural pearl for the Moon, red coral for Mars, emerald for Mercury, yellow sapphire for Jupiter, diamond for Venus, blue sapphire for Saturn, hessonite for Rahu (ascending lunar node), and cat's eye for Ketu (descending lunar node)."

This quote, attributed to Brihat Jataka and is mentioned in Mani-mala as well as Jataka Parijata

माणिक्यं तरणेः सुजात्यममलं मुक्ताफलं शीतगोः
माहेयस्य च विद्रुमं मरकतं सौम्यस्य गारुत्मतम
देवेज्यस्य च पुष्पराजमसुराचार्यस्य वज्रं शनेः
नीलं निर्मलमन्ययोश्च गदिते गोमेदवैदूर्यके

māṇikyaṃ taraṇeḥ sujātyamamalaṃ muktāphalaṃ śītagoḥ
māheyasya ca vidrumaṃ marakataṃ saumyasya gārutmatama
devejyasya ca puṣparājamasurācāryasya vajraṃ śaneḥ
nīlaṃ nirmalamanyayośca gadite gomedavaidūryake

Translation:

- Ruby (māṇikyaṃ) for Surya (taraṇeḥ) (Sun),
- Pearl (muktāphalaṃ) for Chandra (Moon),
- Red coral (vidrumaṃ) for Mangala (māheya) (Mars),
- Emerald (marakataṃ) for Budha (saumya) (Mercury),
- Yellow sapphire (puṣparājaṃ) for Bṛhaspati (devejya) (Jupiter),
- Diamond (vajraṃ) for Shukra (asurācārya) (Venus),
- Blue sapphire (nīlaṃ) for Shani (Saturn),
- Hessonite (gomeda) for Rahu (the ascending lunar node)
- Cat's eye (vaidūryaṃ) for Ketu (the descending lunar node),

"...these gems must be high-born and flawless."

== Setting arrangement ==
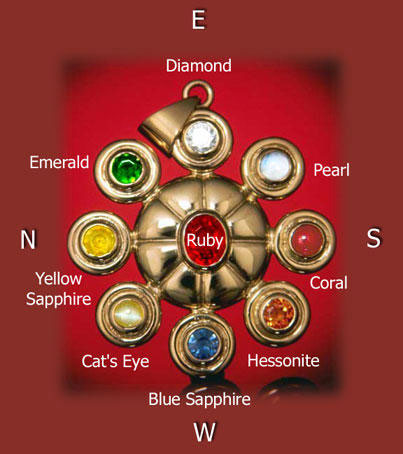
Nine Navaratna gems in a Nava-graha pendant-yantra.

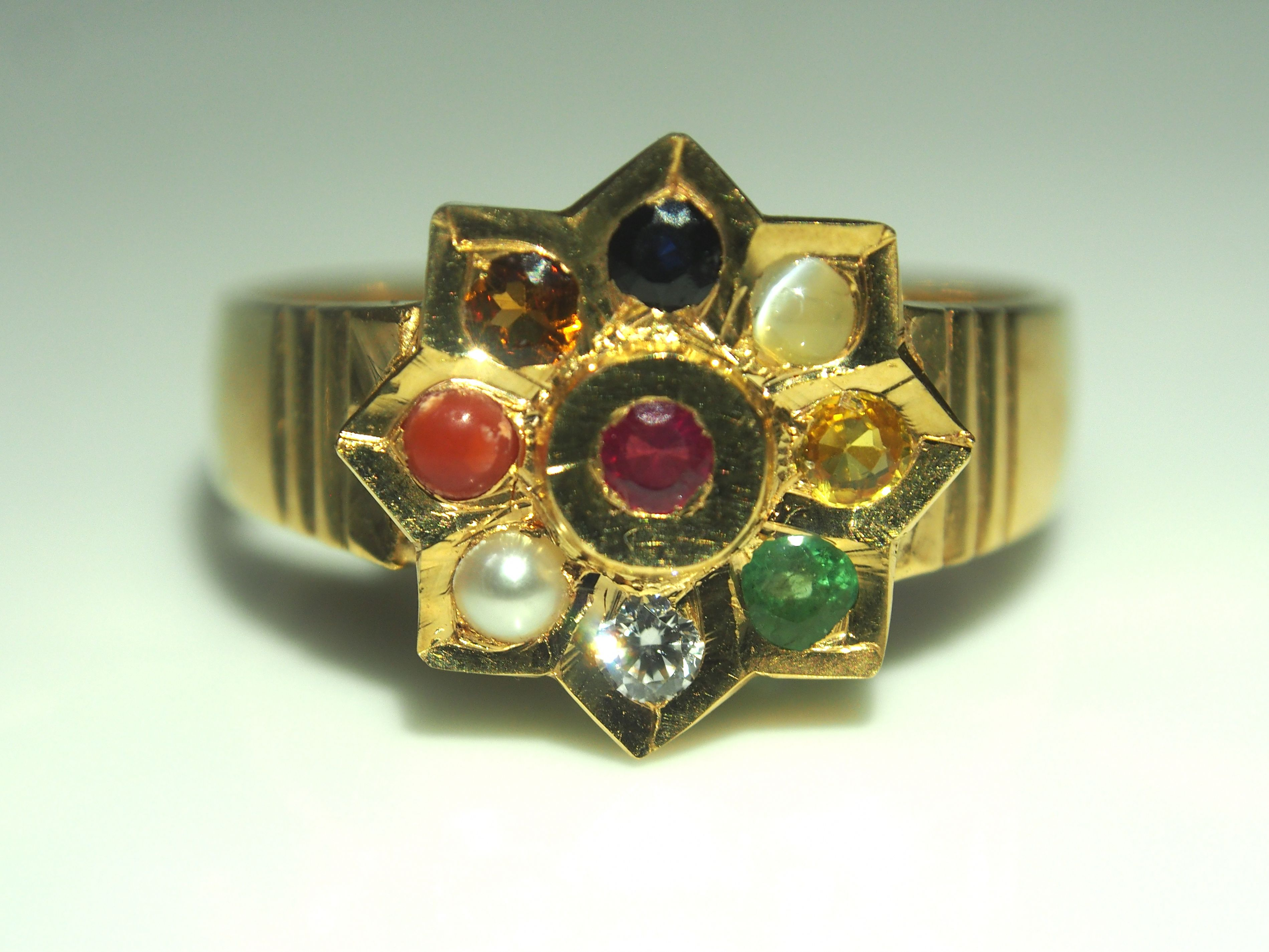
A gold ring studded with Navaratna

The traditional setting and arrangement of the Navaratna are illustrated. A ruby (representing the Sun) is always in the center, surrounded (clockwise from the top) by a diamond, a natural pearl, red coral, hessonite, a blue sapphire, cat's eye, a yellow sapphire, and an emerald.

Traditionally, no gem other than a ruby or a red spinel is set in the center of the arrangement. Because the Sun is the center of the Solar System, its gem is positioned in the heart of a Navaratna Talisman.

For an example of the Navaratna in a necklace setting, see Thailand's "The Queen Sirikit Navaratna."

== Navaratna gem purity ==
In the above sloka the words sujatyam-amalam (sujati=high born, and amala=completely pure or flawless) are significant. According to Asian belief systems, only clean, top-quality gems are considered to be auspicious.

In the Hindu Garuda Purana, chapter 68, verse 17, it is stated by the narrator, Sri Suta Goswami that:

"Pure, flawless gems have auspicious powers which can protect one from demons, snakes, poisons, diseases, sinful reactions, and other dangers, while flawed stones have the opposite effect."

A similar concept exists in the Agni Purana, chapter 246, slokas 7 and 8:

"A gem free from all impurities and radiating its characteristic internal luster should be looked upon as an escort of good luck; a gem which is cracked, fissured, devoid of luster, or appearing rough or sandy, should not be used at all."

== Contemporary ideas on gem therapy by Yogananda in Autobiography of a Yogi ==
"Just as a house can be fitted with a copper rod to absorb the shock of lightning, so the bodily temple can be benefited by various protective measures. Ages ago our yogis discovered that pure metals emit an astral light which is powerfully counteractive to negative pulls of the planets. Subtle electrical and magnetic radiations are constantly circulating in the universe [...] This problem received attention from our rishis; they found helpful not only a combination of metals, but also of plants and most effective of all faultless jewels of not less than two carats. The preventive uses of astrology have seldom been seriously studied outside of India. One little-known fact is that the proper jewels, metals, or plant preparations are valueless unless the required weight is secured, and unless these remedial agents are worn next to the skin."

== Gems in sidereal astrology ==
According to Hindu astrology, life on Earth is influenced by the navagrahas, or nine influencers (the planets). The placement of the navagrahas in one's horoscope is supposed to influence an individual's life. Wearing the nine gems is said to provide an astrological balance and benefit to the wearer. In Hindu astrology, it is believed that these gems may have both positive and negative influences on human life and that astrological gems should be worn only after consulting an astrologer. Based on an individual's sidereal horoscope, either a single gem or a combination of compatible gems is advised to be worn to harness beneficial planets or counteract harmful planets. The supposed "astrological" or "piezoelectric" benefit of wearing or donating gems has not been scientifically quantified.
