= Sirabhorn Sobhon =

Princess of Siam, daughter of Chulalongkorn

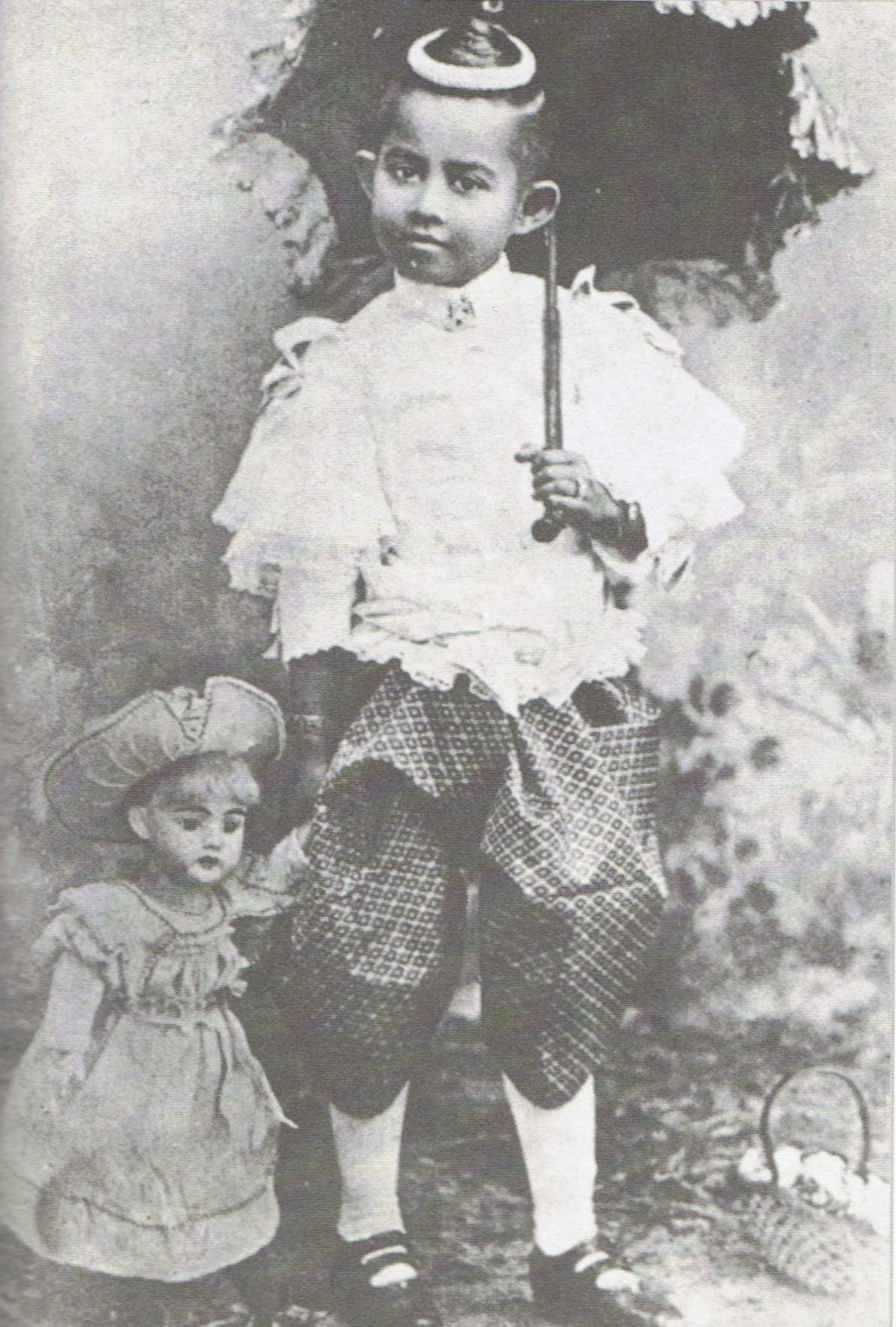
- Born: 19 July 1888; Grand Palace; Bangkok, Siam
- Died: 24 May 1898 (aged 9); Bangkok, Siam
Names
- Sirabhorn Sobhon Bimolratanavadi
- House: Chakri dynasty
- Father: Chulalongkorn (Rama V)
- Mother: Savang Vadhana

Sirabhorn Sobhon (Thai: ศิราภรณ์โสภณ; RTGS: Siraphonsophon; 19 July 1888 – 24 May 1898), was a Princess of Siam (later Thailand). She was a member of the Siamese Royal Family. She was a daughter of Chulalongkorn, King Rama V of Siam.

Her mother was Queen Savang Vadhana, queen consort and half-sister of King Chulalongkorn (later become Queen Sri Savarindira, the Queen Grandmother). She was the 57th daughter of King Chulalongkorn, and the 6th child of Queen Savang Vadhana. She was given the full name from her father as Sirabhorn Sobhon Bimolratanavadi (Thai: ศิราภรณ์โสภณ พิมลรัตนวดี)

She died in her childhood from pneumonia on 24 May 1898, at the age of 9.
