= Mahidol Adulyadej =

Member of the Thai royal family (1892–1929)

Mahidol Adulyadej; มหิดลอดุลยเดช
- Prince Father of Thailand
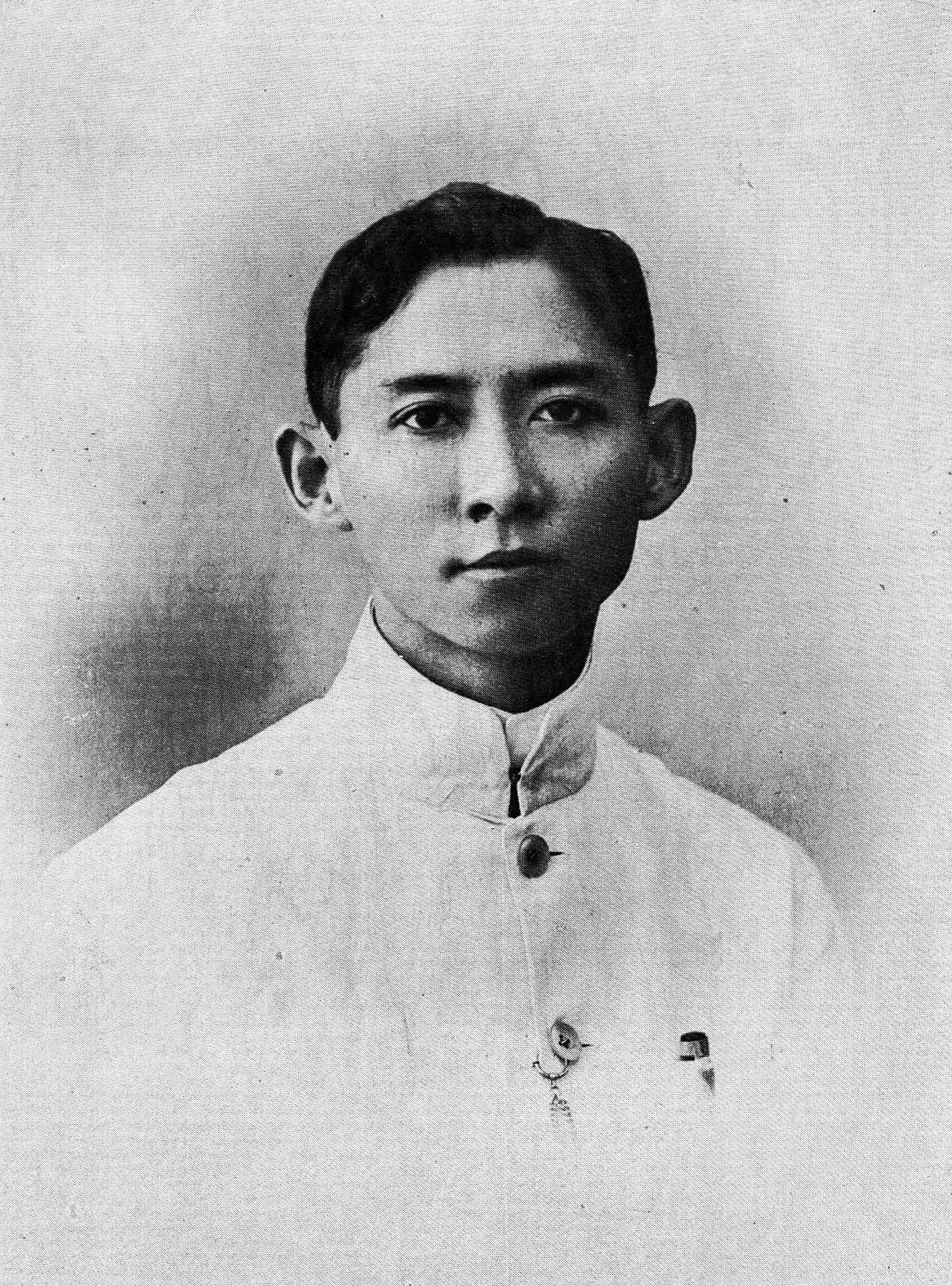
- Mahidol Adulyadej in 1929
- Born: 1 January 1892; Bangkok, Siam
- Died: 24 September 1929 (aged 37); Bangkok, Siam
- Burial: 16 March 1930; Sanam Luang, Bangkok
- Spouse: Sangwan Talapat (m. 1920)
- Issue Detail: Galyani Vadhana, Princess of Naradhiwas; Ananda Mahidol (Rama VIII); Bhumibol Adulyadej (Rama IX)
- House: Mahidol (founder)
- Dynasty: Chakri
- Father: Chulalongkorn (Rama V)
- Mother: Savang Vadhana
- Religion: Theravada Buddhism
- Military career
- Allegiance: Kingdom of Siam
- Branch: Royal Siamese Army; Royal Siamese Navy
- Service years: 1908–1914
- Rank: Senior Colonel; Admiral of the Fleet (posthumous)

Styles of: Prince Mahidol Adulyadej; Prince Father of Thailand
- Reference style: His Royal Highness
- Spoken style: Your Royal Highness

Mahitala Dhibesra Adulyadej Vikrom, the Prince Father (Note: Thai: สมเด็จพระมหิตลาธิเบศร อดุลยเดชวิกรม พระบรมราชชนก RTGS: Somdet Phra Mahitalathibet Adunyadetwikrom Phra Borommaratchachanok) (1 January 1892 – 24 September 1929), formerly Prince Mahidol Adulyadej, Prince of Songkhla (Note: Thai: สมเด็จเจ้าฟ้ามหิดลอดุลยเดช กรมหลวงสงขลานครินทร์) or Mahidol Songkla, was the father of King Ananda Mahidol (Rama VIII) and King Bhumibol Adulyadej (Rama IX) of Thailand, and the paternal grandfather of King Vajiralongkorn (Rama X). He was also regarded as the father of modern medicine and public health in Thailand. He also founded the House of Mahidol or the present Royal Family of Thailand. His two sons reigned for more than eight decades, longer than the Ibn Saud siblings of Saudi Arabia, and the Nahyan siblings of Abu Dhabi.

Prince Mahidol was the 69th child of King Chulalongkorn and the 7th of Queen Savang Vadhana. His mother also adopted four other royal princes whose commoner mother (Chao Chom Manda) had died; among them was Prince Rangsit Prayulsak, later Prince of Chainat, who became a very close friend of Prince Mahidol during his childhood. Later in their lives, Prince Rangsit would play a pivotal role in Mahidol's career, and would later be appointed regent to one of Mahidol's sons, Bhumibol.

== Early life ==
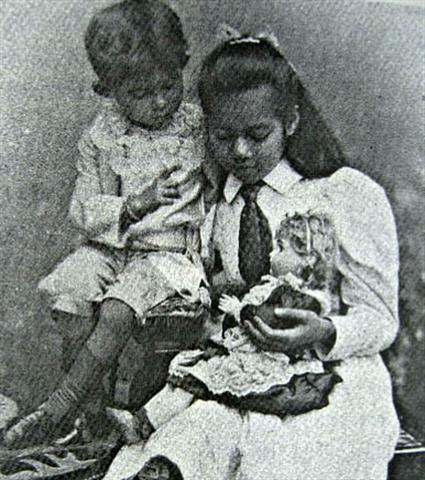
Younger Prince Mahidol Adulyadej and Princess Valaya Alongkorn

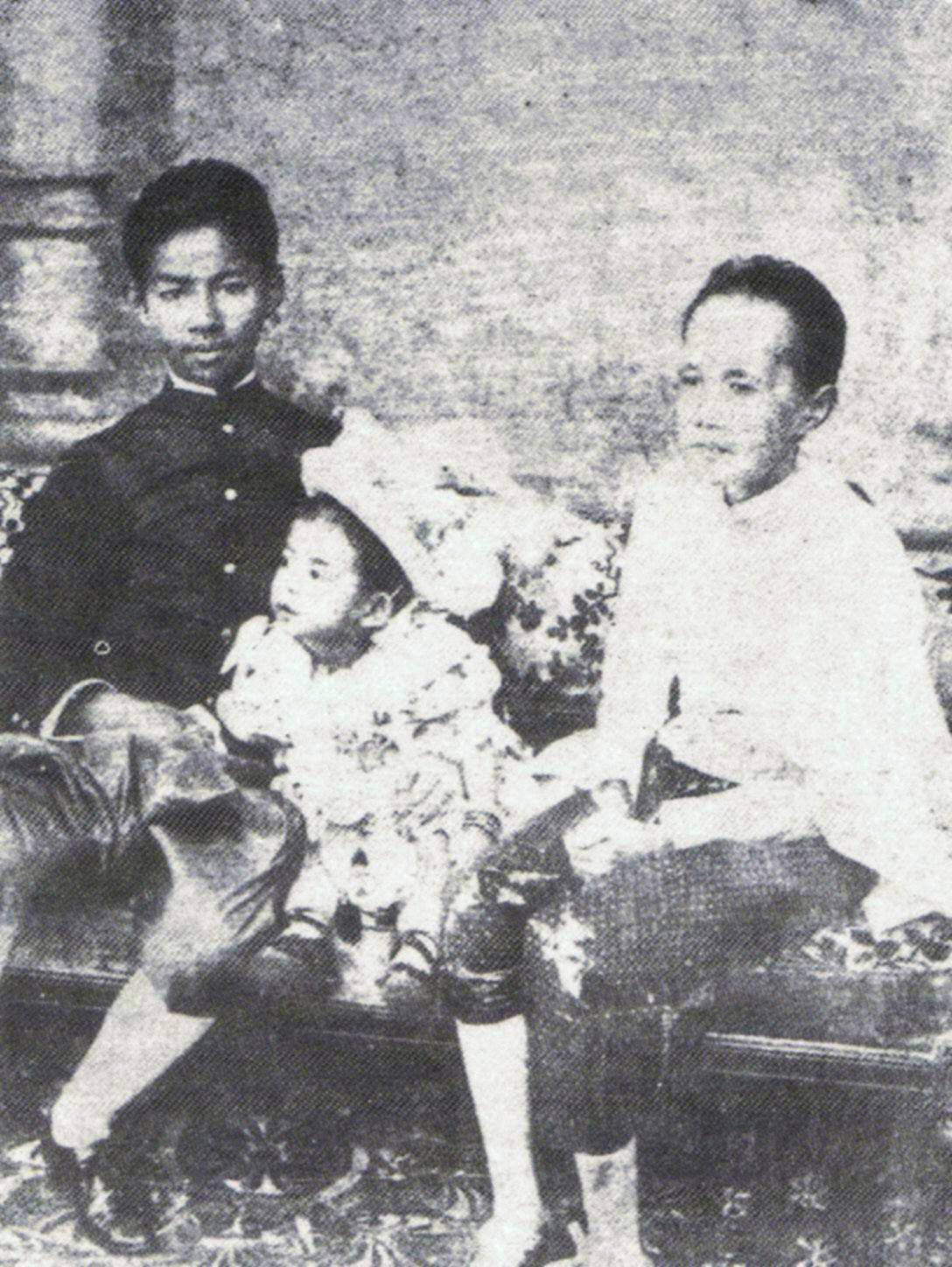
Prince Mahidol Adulyadej (center) with Prince Vajirunhis and Princess Piyamavadi

Like the other sons of King Chulalongkorn, Prince Mahidol started his education at the Royal School within the Grand Palace. He received the title of Prince of Songkla at age 13.

He was sent to London in 1905, and after spending a year and a half in Harrow School, he moved to Germany to join the Royal Prussian Military Preparatory College at Potsdam according to the wish of his father, then continued his military education at the Imperial Military Academy at Groß–Lichterfelde in Berlin. Following the wish of his half-brother, King Vajiravudh, he then entered the Imperial German Naval Academy at Flensburg-Mürwik. While there, he won a competition in submarine design. He was commissioned Lieutenant in both the Imperial German Navy and the Royal Thai Navy in 1912.

The start of World War I compelled the Prince to come back to Thailand in 1914; he was assigned to a teaching post at the Royal Naval Academy. He continued his interest in smaller vessels, including submarines and torpedo boats; this later led to conflict at a meeting, where he was overruled by senior naval officers, most of whom were British graduates and preferred larger vessels. The Prince, feeling that his expertise would never be used, resigned his post nine months after joining the Navy.

== Medical career ==
Prince Mahidol Adulyadej with his sister Princess Valaya Alongkorn and his mother, Queen Sri Savarindira (Savang Vadhana).

His half-brother and old friend Prince Rangsit then came into play. He was at that time Chief of the Royal Medical College. Medical and public health education at that time lagged behind the Western standard. The Medical College and its hospital, Siriraj, were small, crowded, underfunded, understaffed, and ill-equipped. Prince Rangsit, himself a lesser-class prince (as his mother was a commoner), thought that having someone of high prestige like Prince Mahidol (who was a first-class celestial prince, being born to a royal mother who was also a daughter of a king) supporting the movement to improve medical practice and public health in Thailand would generate more interest and probably more funding. He strategically invited Prince Mahidol to a boat trip along the Bangkok Yai and Bangkok Noi canals. His office, Siriraj Hospital, was on the route, and this was where he invited his half-brother to stop and have a look around. Having seen Mahidol's reaction to the poor state of the hospital, Prince Rangsit asked him if he wanted to help; Mahidol's answer at that time was, however, not very positive, as he was concerned that he knew nothing about medicine himself. However, a few days elapsed, and he agreed to help. He also decided he would study in related fields himself.

Thus, the Prince went to Edinburgh, Scotland to study public health at University of Edinburgh and then to Cambridge, Massachusetts to study at Harvard Medical School. He also asked Prince Rangsit to select four students to be sent to the U.S.: two medical students who would be funded by Mahidol himself and two nursing students who would be funded by his mother, Queen Savang Vadhana. It was said that the Prince went to the train station to greet the students himself. This was when an unintended sequel of Prince Rangsit's scheme occurred: one of the nursing students who arrived was the 18-year-old Miss Sangwal Talabhat, future wife of Prince Mahidol and mother of two future kings of Thailand. Mahidol diligently looked after his students, and thus became close to Miss Talabhat, who then accompanied him back to Thailand three years later to attend the funeral of Queen Saovabha. While there, they married under the royal blessing of his half-brother King Vajiravudh at Sapathum Palace before returning to Harvard. He received his Certificate in Public Health the following year (1921).

After his study, he went back to Edinburgh for a break but was also asked to represent the Thai government in liaising with the Rockefeller Foundation, which was offering monetary and technical help to improve Thailand's medical and public health education. His first child, Princess Galyani Vadhana, was born in London in 1923. He returned to Thailand the same year to take the position of Director-General of the University Department in the Ministry of Education. Apart from his administrative duties, he also taught pre-clinical medical students at the Royal Medical College.

== Later life ==
In 1925 he went to Heidelberg, Germany, to have his kidneys treated before going back to his alma mater Harvard University, this time to study medicine. It was in Heidelberg where his first son Prince Ananda Mahidol was born the same year. His youngest son Prince Bhumibol was born in Massachusetts in 1927; six months later he received his M.D. cum laude. He returned to Thailand in December 1928.

One of the first things he did when he returned was to set up scholarships for students in the fields of medicine, nursing, and public health. He was planning to return to Siriraj Hospital for an internship. However, his princely status then became a problem as it was felt that he was too prestigious to be allowed an internship. Undeterred, Mahidol chose another hospital in a more egalitarian environment – the missionary-run McCormick Hospital in Chiang Mai. He worked there, day and night, as a resident doctor. His patients fondly called him "Mho Chao Fa" ('Doctor Prince').

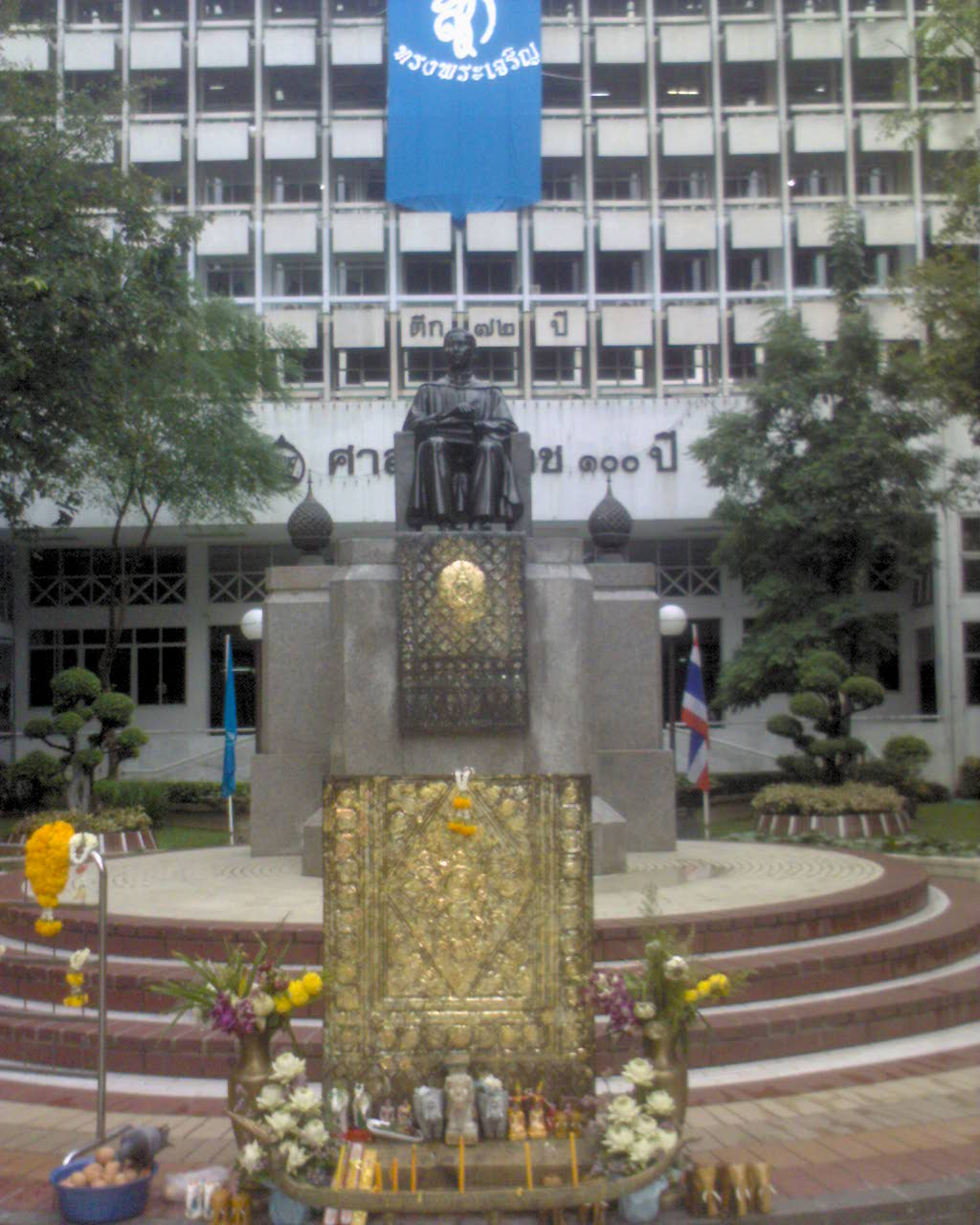
Statue of Mahidol Adulyadej in Siriraj Hospital

Before long, complications with his kidney problems resurfaced. Three weeks after he started working, he visited Bangkok to attend the funeral of his uncle, and was never able to return to Chiang Mai. It appeared that he also had liver abscess, and his health continually deteriorated. Prince Mahidol died on 24 September 1929 at Sapathum Palace.

He was posthumously given the title of the Prince Father (Somdej Phra Mahittalathibet Adulyadejvikrom Phra Borommarajachanok – สมเด็จพระมหิตลาธิเบศ อดุลยเดชวิกรม พระบรมราชชนก) with a special royal rank equivalent to front palaces.

== Legacy ==
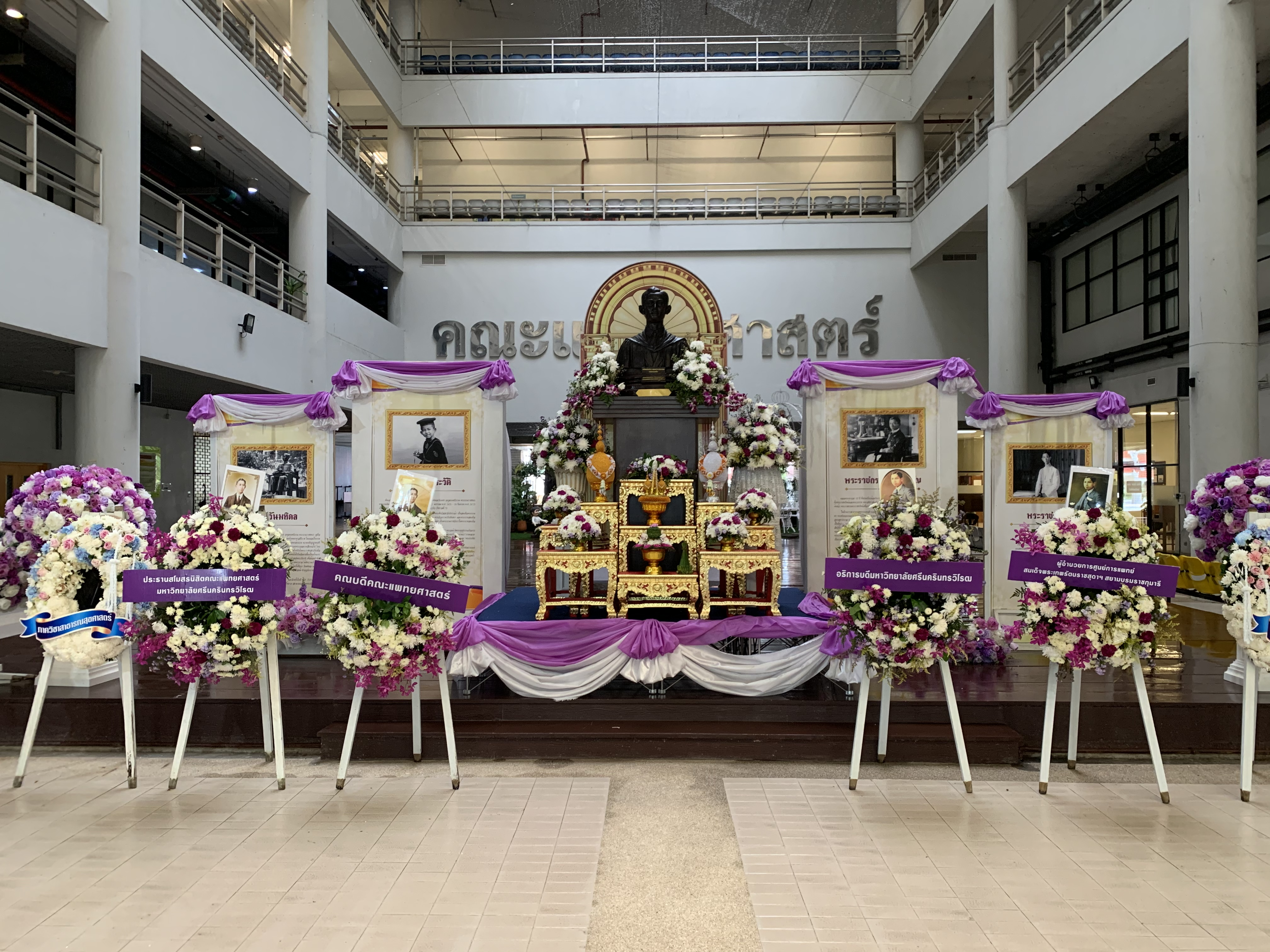
Wreath laying on Mahidol Day, pictured here in 2022 at Faculty of Medicine, Srinakharinwirot University

Prince Mahidol of Songkla taught at Chulalongkorn University. Apart from being an instructor and administrator at the university, he was also of one of its great benefactors. He donated a large amount of his own fortune to set up scholarships which enabled university lecturers in science and medicine to further their studies. He negotiated with Rockefeller Foundation in helping the university improve from its poor academic foundation.

His legacies remain to this day. The students sent abroad under his scholarships became key players in modern medicine of Thailand: many were regarded as great teachers, and some helped establish new medical schools and universities. The Royal Medical School later became the Faculty of Medicine Siriraj Hospital, Chulalongkorn University. It was key source of faculty of Medical University when it was founded in 1943. In 1969 the Medical University was granted the Prince's name by royal decree and became Mahidol University. The "Prince of Songkla" title became the name of Prince of Songkla University in 1967.

In commemoration of the centenary of the Prince's birth, the Prince Mahidol Award was created in 1992. This is an international award in the fields of medicine, public health, and social services. The anniversary of his passing is observed as Mahidol Day.

The following places are named after him:

Public health institute

- Praboromarajchanok Institute, Ministry of Public Health (Thailand)
- Collaborative Project to Increase Production of Rural Doctor, Mahidol University

Academy

- Mahidol University
- Mahidol University International Demonstration School
- Prince Mahidol Hall, Mahidol University
- Prince of Songkla University
- Mahidol Wittayanusorn School
- PSU Wittayanusorn School
- Prince of Songkla University Demonstration School
- Mahittalathibet Building, Faculty of Commerce and Accountancy, Chulalongkorn University
- Mahittalathibet Building, Faculty of Public Health, Burapha University

Species

- Mahidolia mystacina (Valenciennes, 1837)

Others

- Prince Mahidol Award
- Mahidol Road, Chiang Mai province
- Mahidol Adulyadej Naval Base
- Krommaluang Songkhla Nakharin Army Camp

== Issue ==
Name	Birth	Death	Marriage		Their children
Name	Birth	Death	Date	Spouse	Their children
Galyani Vadhana, Princess of Naradhiwas	6 May 1923	2 January 2008 (aged 84)	11 July 1944; Divorced 1950	Aram Rattanakul Serireongrit	Dhasanawalaya Ratanakul Serireongrit
Galyani Vadhana, Princess of Naradhiwas	6 May 1923	2 January 2008 (aged 84)	24 September 1969	Prince Varananda Dhavaj	None
Ananda Mahidol (Rama VIII)	20 September 1925	9 June 1946 (aged 20)	None		None
Bhumibol Adulyadej (Rama IX)	5 December 1927	13 October 2016 (aged 88)	28 April 1950	Sirikit Kitiyakara	Princess Ubolratana
Bhumibol Adulyadej (Rama IX)	5 December 1927	13 October 2016 (aged 88)	28 April 1950	Sirikit Kitiyakara	Vajiralongkorn (Rama X)
Bhumibol Adulyadej (Rama IX)	5 December 1927	13 October 2016 (aged 88)	28 April 1950	Sirikit Kitiyakara	Sirindhorn, Princess Royal
Bhumibol Adulyadej (Rama IX)	5 December 1927	13 October 2016 (aged 88)	28 April 1950	Sirikit Kitiyakara	Chulabhorn, Princess Srisavangavadhana

== Military rank ==
- Senior Colonel, Admiral of the Fleet

=== Wild Tiger Corps of Thailand rank ===
- Colonel of the Wild Tiger Corps

=== Civil Service of Siam rank ===
- Chancellor of Minister of Education (Siam)

== Arms ==
Coat of arms of Prince Mahidol Adulyadej, the Prince of Songkhla
Coronet The Jata Maha Kathin (A royal crown for the great Kathina festival) and the Emblem of the Chakri dynasty. Escutcheon Per fess, the chief per pale. Orange dexter chief with Or Great Crown of Victory. Rose sinister chief with a Phra kiao (coronet) with halo on top of pillow. Azure base with a stylized Thai alphabet "ม" (Mo Ma). Symbolism A Great Crown of Victory with a rays of light emitting from the top and a Urna on an orange field represents the prince is a grandson of King Mongkut who was born on Wednesday. Phra kiao (coronet) with halo on top of pillow on a pink field represents the prince is a son of King Chulalongkorn who was born on Tuesday. Azure base mean the prince was born on Friday while a stylized Thai alphabet "ม" (Mo Ma) is his royal monogram. Other versions

== See also ==
- Srinagarindra
- Galyani Vadhana
- Ananda Mahidol
- Bhumibol Adulyadej
- Chulalongkorn University
- Mahidol University
- Prince of Songkla University
- Mahidolia mystacina
