= Vichitra Chiraprabha =

Princess of Siam, daughter of Chulalongkorn

- Born: 21 April 1881; Grand Palace, Bangkok, Siam
- Died: 15 August 1881 (aged 3 months 25 days); Bangkok, Siam
- House: Chakri dynasty
- Father: Chulalongkorn (Rama V)
- Mother: Savang Vadhana

Princess Vichitra Chiraprabha (Thai: วิจิตรจิรประภา; RTGS: Wichit Chiraprapha; 21 April 1881 – 15 August 1881) was a Princess of Siam (later Thailand). She was a member of the Siamese royal family, the daughter of Chulalongkorn.

Her mother was Queen Savang Vadhana, consort and half-sister of King Chulalongkorn (later become Queen Sri Savarindira, the Queen Grandmother). She was the eldest daughter and the third child of King Chulalongkorn and Queen Savang Vadhana together. She was given the full name by her father as Vichitra Chiraprabha Adulyadirekratana Khattiyarajakumari (Thai: วิจิตรจิรประภา อดุลยาดิเรกรัตน ขัตติยราชกุมารี)

She died in infancy on 15 August 1881, at the age of 3 months.
