= Vajirunhis =

Vajirunhis; วชิรุณหิศ
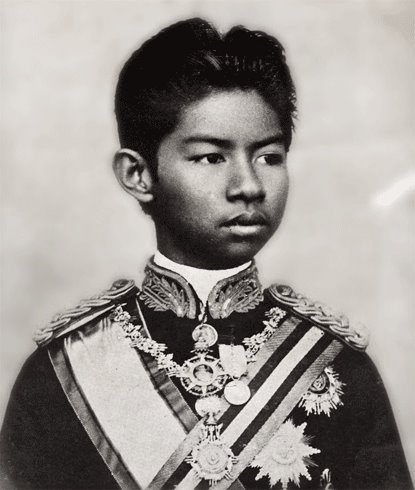
- Crown Prince Vajirunhis, c. 1890s

Crown Prince of Siam
- Tenure: 14 January 1886 – 4 January 1895
- Appointer: Chulalongkorn (Rama V)
- Predecessor: Position established; (Wichaichan as Viceroy)
- Successor: Vajiravudh (later Rama VI)
- Born: 27 June 1878; Bangkok, Siam
- Died: 4 January 1895 (aged 16); Bangkok, Siam
- Dynasty: Chakri
- Father: Chulalongkorn (Rama V)
- Mother: Savang Vadhana
- Religion: Theravada Buddhism

Maha Vajirunhis, Crown Prince of Siam (Thai: มหาวชิรุณหิศ; RTGS: Maha Wachirunnahit; 27 June 1878 – 4 January 1895) was the first Crown Prince of the Chakri dynasty. He was the first son of King Chulalongkorn and Queen Savang Vadhana together, who were half-siblings.

The King built a palace for the Prince, nicknamed Windsor Palace. The European-style palace was demolished after his death. The site is now occupied by the National Stadium of Thailand.

== Heir apparent ==
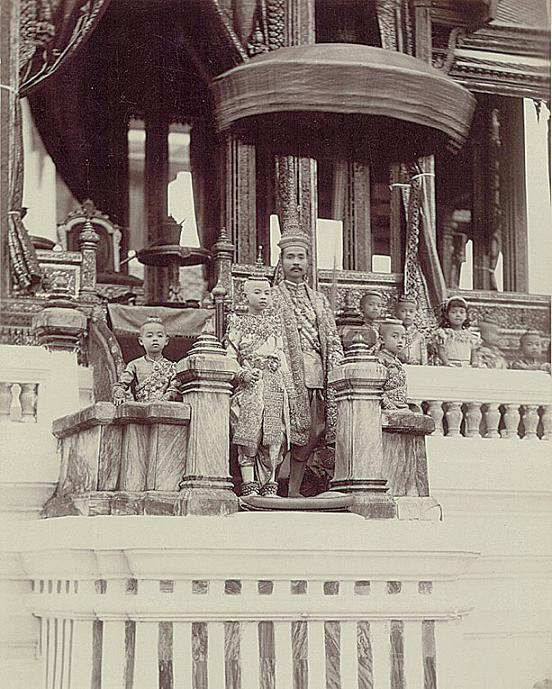
Maha Vajirunhis with his father, King Chulalongkorn, in court dress at the Grand Palace, 1890

In 1886, after the death of the last Viceroy, Wichaichan, King Chulalongkorn chose not to appoint one of his brothers as the new Viceroy, but instead appointed his eldest son as the Crown Prince of Siam. On 14 January 1886, he was officially introduced to his position with the title of Sayam Makutratchakuman, or Crown Prince of Siam. From this appointment Sir Ernest Mason Satow, the British ambassador to Thailand, brought a telegraph of congratulations from Queen Victoria of the United Kingdom.

== Private interests ==
Prince Vajirunhis was interested in the liberal arts, writing daily in a diary he was given by his father at the age of five. He wrote many poems. One, written for his father on 25 October 1888, is below:

Love who as love is

Father
Love doesn't want to ever estrange
Even a little
Love what else cannot be
Equal to him
Much love cannot be away from
Father someday

== Death ==
He died unexpectedly of typhoid fever at age 16, long before he could reach the throne. King Chulalongkorn's second son, Prince Vajiravudh, was then named crown prince, and succeeded him as Rama VI in 1910.

== Titles, honours and symbols ==
=== Titles and styles ===
Styles of Crown Prince Maha Vajirunhis
- Reference style: His Royal Highness
- Spoken style: Your Royal Highness

- 27 June 1878 – 13 January 1887 : His Royal Highness Prince Maha Vajirunhis (สมเด็จพระเจ้าลูกยาเธอ เจ้าฟ้ามหาวชิรุณหิศ Somdet Phra Chao Luk Ya Ther Chao Fa Maha Vajirunhis)
- 14 January 1887 – 4 January 1896 : His Royal Highness Crown Prince Maha Vajirunhis (สมเด็จพระบรมโอรสาธิราช เจ้าฟ้ามหาวชิรุณหิศ สยามมกุฎราชกุมาร Somdet Phra Boromma Orasathirat Chao Fa Maha Vajirunhis Sayammakutratchkuman)
- 23 October 1910 - 2 March 1935 : His Royal Highness Crown Prince Maha Vajirunhis, the Royal Prince Elder Brother (สมเด็จพระบรมเชษฐาธิราช เจ้าฟ้ามหาวชิรุณหิศ สยามมกุฎราชกุมาร Somdet Phra Boromma Chetthathirat Chao Fa Maha Vajirunhis Sayammakutratchkuman)
- 2 March 1935 - Present : His Royal Highness Crown Prince Maha Vajirunhis, the Royal Prince Uncle (สมเด็จพระบรมราชปิตุลาธิบดี เจ้าฟ้ามหาวชิรุณหิศ สยามมกุฎราชกุมาร Somdet Phra Boromma Ratchapitulathibodi Chao Fa Maha Vajirunhis Sayammakutratchkuman)

Royal decorations

- 1882: Knight of the Most Illustrious Order of the Royal House of Chakri
- 1886: Knight of Order of the Nine Gems
- 1886: Knight Grand Cross of the Most Illustrious Order of Chula Chom Klao
- 1896: Knight Grand Cross of the Order of the White Elephant (First Class)
- unknown: Knight Grand Cross of the Order of the Crown of Thailand (First Class)

Foreign honors

- France :
  - 1892 - Knight Grand Cross of the Legion of Honour
- Denmark :
  - 1891 - Knight Grand Cross of the Order of the Dannebrog
- Russian Empire :
  - 1892 - Knight of the Imperial Order of Saint Alexander Nevsky
- German Empire :
  - 1891 - Knight Grand Cross of the Order of the Red Eagle
- Kingdom of Italy :
  - Unknown - Knight Grand Cross of the Order of Saints Maurice and Lazarus

Symbols

Royal emblem of Crown Prince Maha Vajirunhis

Royal emblem of Crown Prince Maha Vajirunhis with collar of the Order of Chula Chom Klao

Royal emblem of Crown Prince Maha Vajirunhis at Wat Mahathat, Bangkok

Vajirunhis Chakri dynasty Born: 27 June 1878 Died: 4 January 1895
Thai royalty
Preceded by Wichaichan as Viceroy of Siam	Crown Prince of Siam; 14 January 1886 – 4 January 1895	Succeeded by Vajiravudh
