= Sommatiwongse Varodaya =

- Prince of Nakhon Si Thammarat
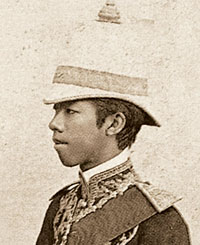
- Born: 9 June 1882; Bangkok, Siam
- Died: 17 June 1899 (aged 17); Bangkok, Siam
- House: Chakri dynasty
- Father: Chulalongkorn (Rama V)
- Mother: Savang Vadhana

Prince Sommatiwongse Varodaya, The Prince of Nakhon Si Thammarat (Thai: สมมุติวงศ์วโรทัย; RTGS: Sommuttiwong Warothai) was the Prince of Siam (later Thailand). He was a member of the Siamese royal family and a son of King Chulalongkorn Rama V of Siam.

His mother was Queen Savang Vadhana, a daughter of King Mongkut (thus his father's half-sister) and Princess Piyamavadi

Prince Sommatiwongse Varodaya died on 17 June 1899 at the age 17.

== Arms ==
Coat of arms of the Prince of Nakhon Si Thammarat
| Crest The Chada pin Jigha (coronet) named "Jata Maha Kathin" (A royal crown for the great Kathina festival) from the top and the Emblem of the Chakri dynasty. Escutcheon Per fess, the chief per pale. Orange dexter chief with Or Great Crown of Victory. Rose sinister chief with a Phra kiao (coronet) with halo on top of pillow. Purpure base with a marble. Symbolism A Great Crown of Victory with a rays of light emitting from the top and a Urna on an orange field represents the Prince is a grandson of King Mongkut who was born on Wednesday. Phra kiao (coronet) with halo on top of pillow on a pink field represents the Prince is a son of King Chulalongkorn who was born on Tuesday. A marble. Purpure base mean the Prince was born on Friday. |
