= Phra kiao =

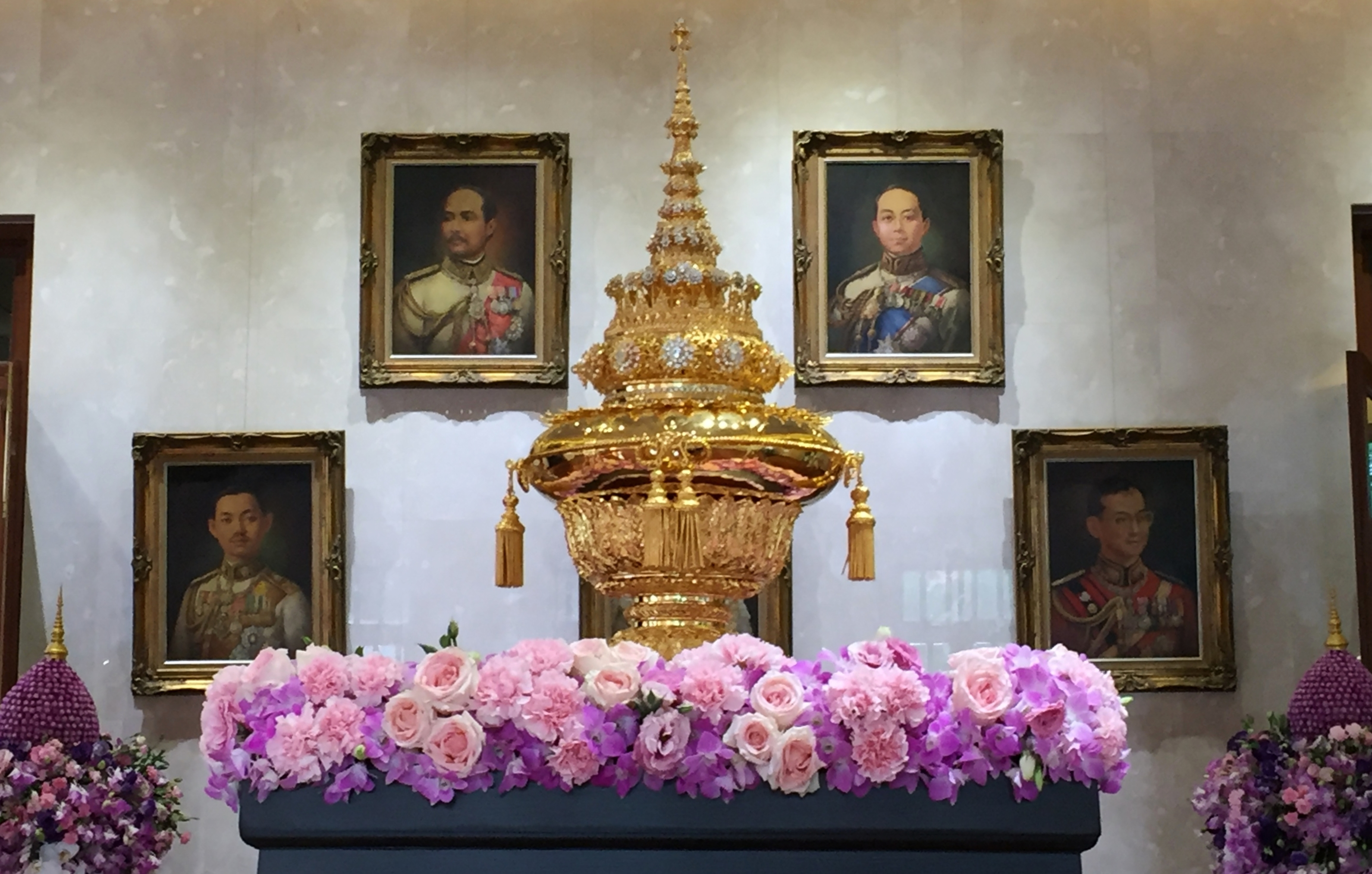
Phra Kiao replica on display at Chulalongkorn University Memorial Hall

Phra kiao (Thai: พระเกี้ยว [pʰráʔ kîaw]), the Thai equivalent of the coronet, is a headgear traditionally worn by young princes and princesses. King Chulalongkorn adopted it as his personal emblem, as it coincided with the literal translation of his name.

When King Chulalongkorn founded the Royal Pages School, he granted permission for the Phra Kiao to be used as the school's cap badge and symbol. The school later became Chulalongkorn University, which has since inherited and retained the symbol's use.

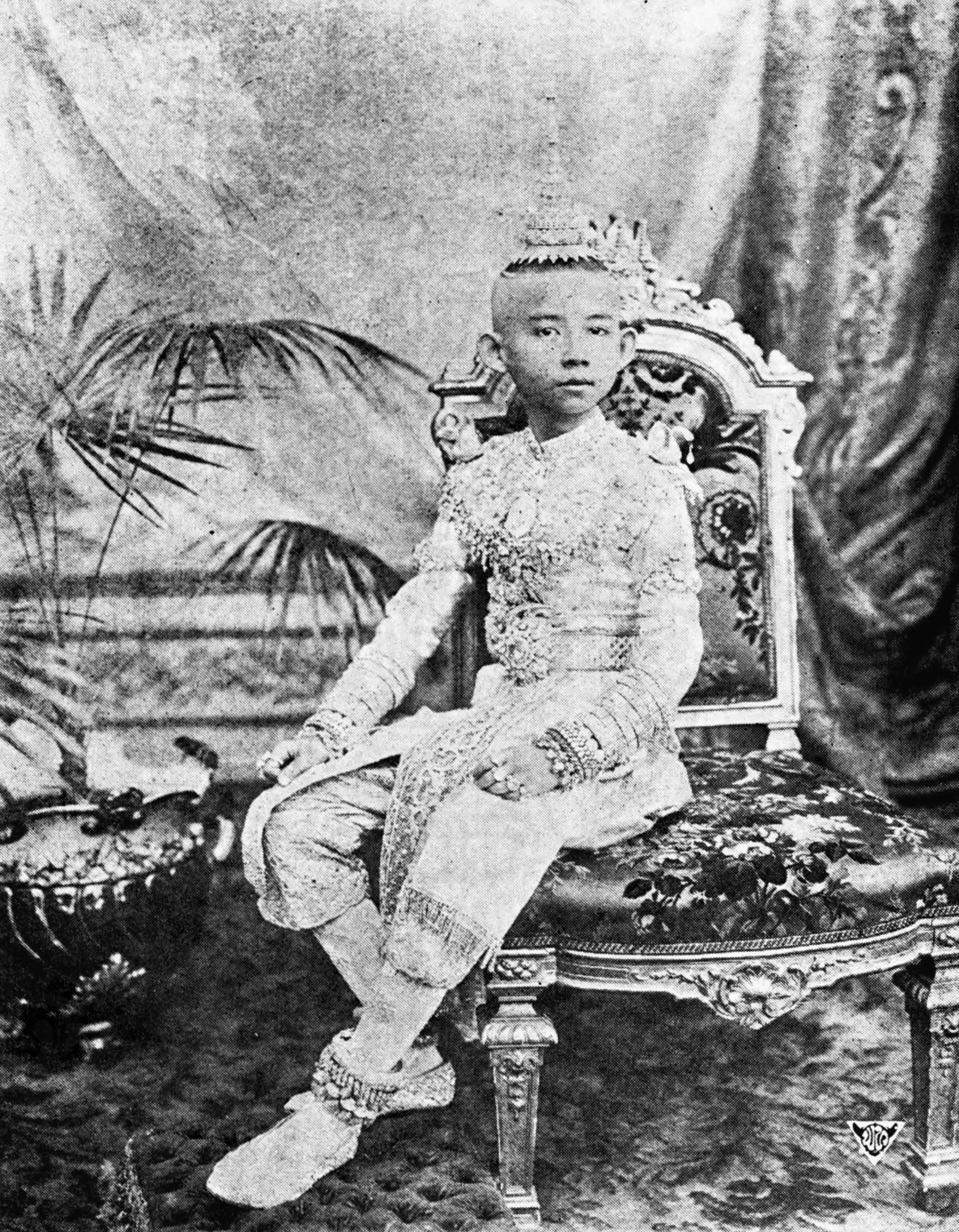
Prince Mahidol Adulyadej wearing Phra Kiao as a part of his tonsure ceremony in 1903

The symbol is also used by several schools historically associated with King Chulalongkorn and the university, most notably Triam Udom Suksa School.
