= Nabhabhorn Prabha =

- Princess Dibayaratana Kiritkulini
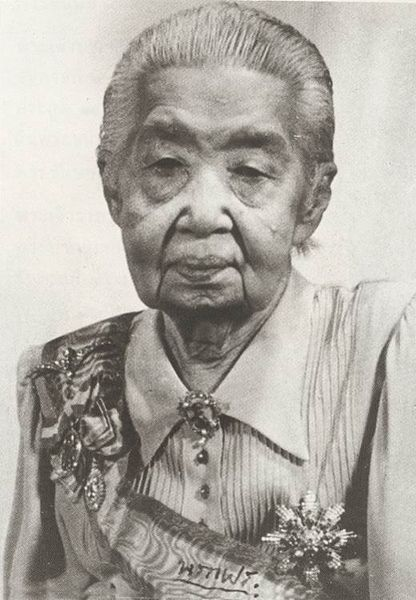
- Born: 13 May 1864; Bangkok, Siam
- Died: 19 July 1958 (aged 94); Bangkok, Siam
- House: Chakri Dynasty
- Father: Mongkut (Rama IV)
- Mother: Samli Bunnag

Princess Nabhabhorn Prabha, the Princess Dibayaratana Kiritkulini (Thai: นภาพรประภา RTGS: Napha phon prapha), 13 May 1864 - 19 July 1958, was a Princess of Siam (later Thailand). She was a member of Siamese royal family as a daughter of King Mongkut and Chao Khun Chom Manda Samli.

Her mother was Samli Bunnag (is a daughter of Tat Bunnag and Klai Bunnag), She was given full name as Phra Chao Borom Wong Ther Phra Ong Chao Nabhabhorn Prabha Krom Luang Dibayaratana Kiritkulini (Thai: พระเจ้าบรมวงศ์เธอ พระองค์เจ้านภาพรประภา กรมหลวงทิพยรัตนกิริฎกุลินี).

Princess Nabhabhorn Prabha died on 19 July 1958 at the age 94.

Nabhabhorn Prabha, the Princess Dibayaratana Kiritkulini House of Chakri Born: 13 May 1864 Died: 19 July 1958
Honorary titles
Preceded by Queen Sri Savarindira	Eldest Royal Member of the Chakri Dynasty; 1955–1958	Succeeded by Princess Pradittha Sari
