= Order of the Royal House of Chakri =

Dynastic order in Thailand

The Most Illustrious Order of the Royal House of Chakri เครื่องขัตติยราชอิสริยาภรณ์อันมีเกียรติคุณรุ่งเรืองยิ่งมหาจักรีบรมราชวงศ์
- Star of the Most Illustrious Order of the Royal House of Chakri

Awarded by the King of Thailand
- Type: Dynastic order
- Established: 1882; 144 years ago
- Royal house: House of Chakri
- Seat: 25 (except for foreigners)
- Eligibility: Members of the Thai Royal Family and foreign heads of state
- Criteria: At the monarch's pleasure
- Status: Currently constituted
- Founder: Chulalongkorn
- Sovereign: Vajiralongkorn
- Grades: Knight/Dame

Statistics
- First induction: 6 April 1882
- Last induction: 5 May 2019
- Total inductees: 232

Precedence
- Next (higher): Order of the Rajamitrabhorn
- Next (lower): Order of the Nine Gems
- Ribbon bar of the Royal House of Chakri

The Most Illustrious Order of the Royal House of Chakri (Thai: เครื่องขัตติยราชอิสริยาภรณ์อันมีเกียรติคุณรุ่งเรืองยิ่งมหาจักรีบรมราชวงศ์; RTGS: Khrueang Khattiyaratcha-itsariyaphon An Mi Kiattikhun Rung-rueang Ying Maha Chakkri Borommaratchawong) was founded in 1882 by King Chulalongkorn (Rama V) of the Kingdom of Siam (now Thailand) to commemorate the Bangkok Centennial. The order is awarded to members of the House of Chakri (the Thai royal family), foreign heads of state and members of other royal houses.

Members of the order are entitled to use the postnominals ม.จ.ก.

== Insignias ==
=== Sovereign ===
The Sovereign Grand Master of the order is a Knight. the Star and Pendant have been decorated by diamonds and are called Maha Savamissaradhibodi. (Thai: มหาสวามิศราธิบดี)

=== Queen Consort ===
The Queen Consort of the Order is a Dame. The Star has been decorated by diamonds and is called Maha Savamini. (Thai: มหาสวามินี)

=== Knight ===
The decoration consists of a single class (knight). The insignia is:

- Pendant of Chakri, suspended from collar.
- Pendant of Chula Chakri, attached onto the yellow sash, to be worn over the left shoulder to the right hip.
- Star of Chakri, to be worn on the left breast.
Pendant of Chakri

Royal monogram of King Rama I as "P.R.R.4" (Parama Rajadhiraja Ramadhipati IV) inside the royal crown of the Pendant of Chakri

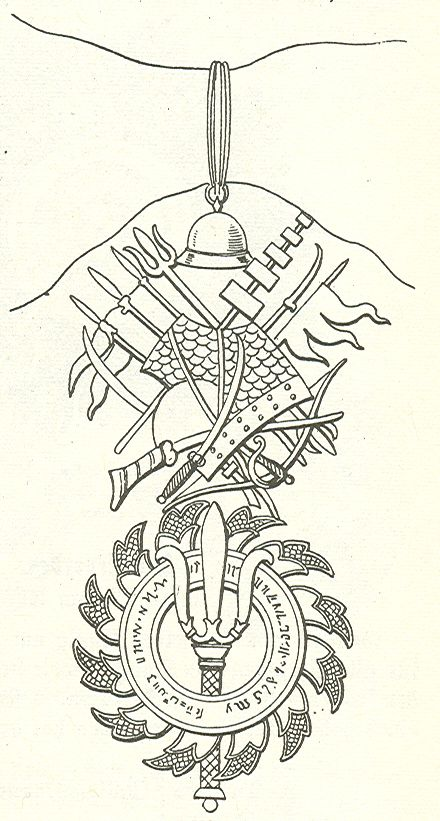
Pendant of Chula Chakri

Star of the Order

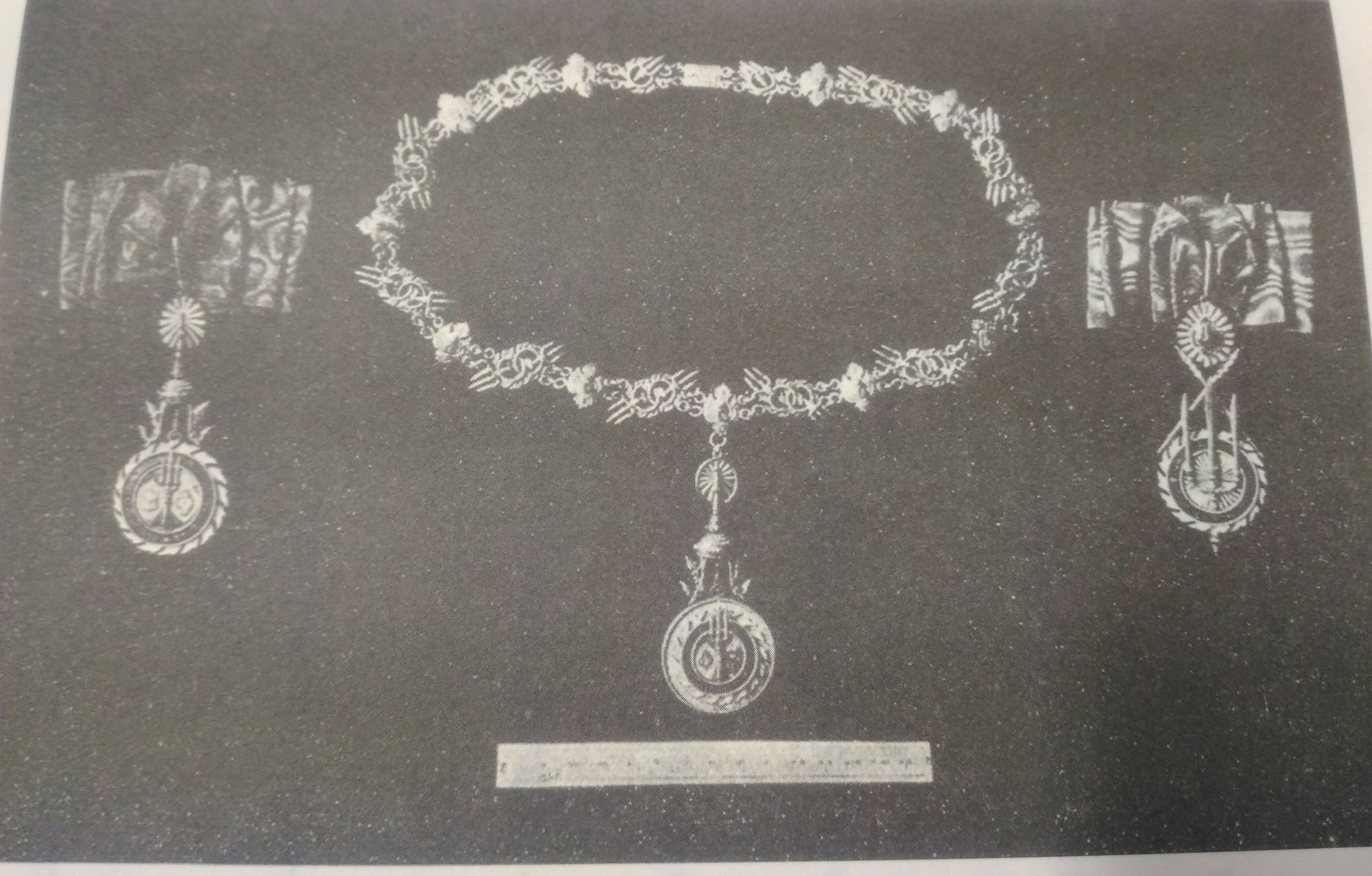
Insignias of the Secretary (Left), Chancellor (Collar), Officer (Right)

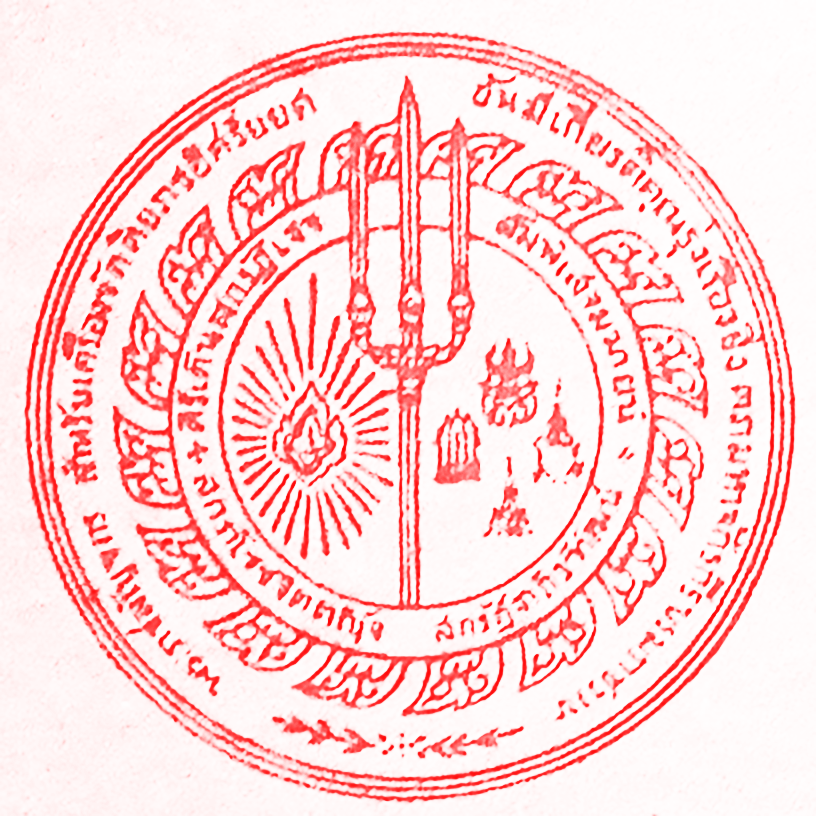
Seal of the Order of the Royal House of Chakri

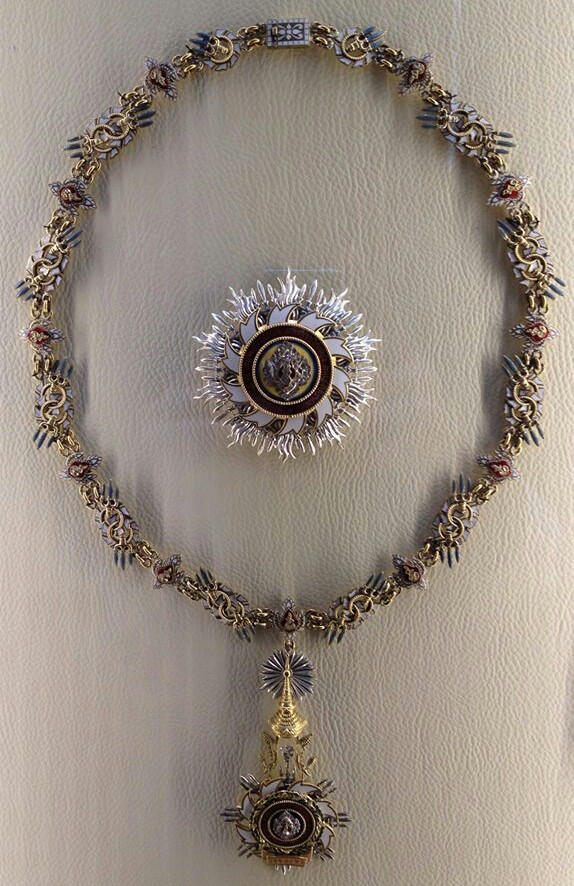
Collar and Star of the Most Illustrious Order of the Royal House of Chakri

=== Former officers ===
- Chancellor (Thai: ลัญจกราภิบาล): Only held by Chao Phraya Phasakornwongse (Phon Bunnag), his insignia was a collar but with a different pendant.
- Secretary (Thai: เลขานุการ): Only held by HSH Prince Prapakorn Malakul, his insignia was the same as the Chancellor but with a ribbon.
- Officer (Thai: มุทรานุการ): Only held by Phra Banroepakdi (Korn Kornsut), his insignia was a ribbon with a pendant decorated by the coat of arms.

== Living recipients of the order ==
Rama IX (1946–2016)
| Image | Name | Country | Date | Present age | Notes | Ref. |
|---|---|---|---|---|---|---|
| | HM Queen Margrethe of Denmark RMBh MChK | Denmark | 6 September 1960 | 86 | Former Queen of Denmark | |
| | HRH Princess Beatrix of the Netherlands RMBh MChK | Netherlands | 24 October 1960 | 88 | Former Queen of the Netherlands | |
| | Princess Ubolratana Rajakanya MChK PCh MPCh MVM | Thailand | 6 December 1961 | 75 | | |
| | HM Emperor Akihito of Japan RMBh MChk | Japan | 27 May 1963 | 92 | Emperor Emeritus of Japan | |
| | HM Empress Michiko of Japan MChK | Japan | 27 May 1963 | 91 | Empress Emerita of Japan | |
| | HM King Maha Vajiralongkorn RMBh MChK NR PChW SR | Thailand | 4 December 1965 | 74 | Sovereign of the order since 13 October 2016. | |
| | HIM Empress Farah Pahlavi of Iran MChK | Imperial State of Iran (now Islamic Republic of Iran) | 22 January 1968 | 87 | Last Empress Consort of Iran | |
| | HRH Princess Maha Chakri Sirindhorn, the Princess Royal MChK NR PCh MPCh MVM | Thailand | 14 December 1971 | 71 | | |
| | HRH Princess Chulabhorn Walailak, the Princess Srisavangavadhana MChK NR PCh MPCh MVM | Thailand | 27 May 1974 | 69 | | |
| | HRH Princess Soamsawali, the Princess Suddhanarinatha MChK NR PCh MPCh MVM | Thailand | 3 January 1977 | 69 | | |
| | HM King Juan Carlos I of Spain RMBh MChK | Spain | 22 February 2006 | 88 | King Emeritus of Spain | |
| | HM Queen Sofía of Spain MChK PCh | Spain | 22 February 2006 | 87 | Queen Emerita of Spain | |
Rama X (2016–present)
| Image | Name | Country | Date | Present age | Notes | Ref. |
| | HM Queen Suthida MChK NR PCh MPCh MVM | Thailand | 1 May 2019 | 48 | Queen Consort of Thailand | |
| | HRH Princess Sirivannavari MChK PCh MPCh MVM PBh | Thailand | 5 May 2019 | 39 | | |
| | HRH Prince Dipangkorn Rasmijoti MChK PCh BR1 VR1 | Thailand | 5 May 2019 | 21 | Heir presumptive to the Thai throne | |

== Foreign recipients of the order ==
| Name | Nationality | Known for | Date of appointment | Ref. |
|---|---|---|---|---|
| Queen Victoria | United Kingdom | Queen of the United Kingdom | 5 May 1887 | |
| King Edward VII (as Prince of Wales) | United Kingdom | King of the United Kingdom | 5 May 1887 | |
| Emperor William I | German Empire | German Emperor | 1 September 1887 | |
| Emperor Meiji | Empire of Japan | Emperor of Japan | 22 December 1887 | |
| King Oscar II | Sweden | King of Sweden | 29 October 1888 | |
| Emperor Franz Josef I | Austria-Hungary | Emperor of Austria | 4 January 1888 | |
| Emperor Nicholas II (as Tsarevich of Russia) | Russian Empire | Emperor of Russia | 20 March 1891 | |
| Emperor William II | German Empire | German Emperor | 15 July 1891 | |
| Emperor Alexander III | Russian Empire | Emperor of Russia | 15 July 1891 | |
| King Christian IX | Denmark | King of Denmark | 15 July 1891 | |
| King Umberto I | Kingdom of Italy | King of Italy | 15 July 1891 | |
| Sultan Abdul Hamid II | Ottoman Empire | Sultan of Ottoman Empire | 18 December 1892 | |
| Prince Thomas, Duke of Genoa | Kingdom of Italy | Duke of Genoa | 14 May 1897 | |
| Prince Emanuele Filiberto, Duke of Aosta | Kingdom of Italy | Duke of Aosta | 1 June 1897 | |
| King Victor Emmanuel III of Italy | Kingdom of Italy | King of Italy | 1 June 1897 | |
| Queen Margherita of Italy | Kingdom of Italy | Queen of Italy | 6 June 1897 | |
| Archduke Ludwig Viktor | Austria-Hungary | Archduke of Austria | 23 June 1897 | |
| Archduke Otto | Austria-Hungary | Archduke of Austria | 23 June 1897 | |
| Archduke Eugen | Austria-Hungary | Archduke of Austria | 23 June 1897 | |
| Grand Duke Michael Alexandrovich | Russian Empire | Grand Duke of Russia | 4 July 1897 | |
| Grand Duke Sergei Alexandrovich | Russian Empire | Grand Duke of Russia | 4 July 1897 | |
| Grand Duke Alexei Alexandrovich | Russian Empire | Grand Duke of Russia | 4 July 1897 | |
| Grand Duke Paul Alexandrovich | Russian Empire | Grand Duke of Russia | 4 July 1897 | |
| Grand Duke Alexander Mikhailovich | Russian Empire | Grand Duke of Russia | 4 July 1897 | |
| Grand Duke Michael Mikhailovich | Russian Empire | Grand Duke of Russia | 4 July 1897 | |
| King Gustaf V (as Crown Prince of Sweden) | Sweden | King of Sweden | 13 July 1897 | |
| Prince Carl | Sweden | Duke of Västergötland | 13 July 1897 | |
| Prince Eugen | Sweden | Duke of Närke | 13 July 1897 | |
| Prince Oscar | Sweden | Prince Bernadotte | 13 July 1897 | |
| King Frederik VIII (as Crown Prince of Denmark) | Denmark | King of Denmark | 15 July 1897 | |
| King Christian X (as Prince of Denmark) | Denmark | King of Denmark | 15 July 1897 | |
| Prince Valdemar | Denmark | Prince of Denmark | 15 July 1897 | |
| King George V (as Duke of York) | United Kingdom | King of the United Kingdom | 30 July 1897 | |
| King Albert | Saxony | King of Saxony | 24 August 1897 | |
| King George (as Prince of Saxony) | Saxony | King of Saxony | 24 August 1897 | |
| King Frederick Augustus III (as Prince of Saxony) | Saxony | King of Saxony | 24 August 1897 | |
| Duke John Albert | Mecklenburg-Schwerin | Duke of Mecklenburg | 29 August 1897 | |
| Queen Wilhelmina | Netherlands | Queen of the Netherlands | 7 September 1897 | |
| Queen Emma | Netherlands | Queen consort of the Netherlands | 7 September 1897 | |
| King Leopold II | Belgium | King of the Belgians | 9 September 1897 | |
| Félix Faure | France | President of France | 15 September 1897 | |
| Grand Duke Frederick I | Baden | Grand Duke of Baden | 5 October 1897 | |
| King Alfonso XIII | Spain | King of Spain | 18 October 1897 | |
| Queen Maria Christina | Spain | Queen consort of Spain | 18 October 1897 | |
| King Carlos I | Portugal | King of Portugal | 23 October 1897 | |
| Prince Afonso | Portugal | Duke of Porto | 23 October 1897 | |
| Prince Vittorio Emanuele | Kingdom of Italy | Count of Turin | 10 December 1898 | |
| Empress Shōken | Empire of Japan | Empress of Japan | 12 October 1899 | |
| Prince Henry | Prussia | Prince of Prussia | 24 December 1899 | |
| Emperor Taishō (as Crown Prince of Japan) | Empire of Japan | Emperor of Japan | 26 October 1899 | |
| Grand Duke Frederick Francis IV | Mecklenburg-Schwerin | Grand Duke of Mecklenburg-Schwerin | 2 April 1902 | |
| Grand Duke Boris Vladimirovich | Russian Empire | Grand Duke of Russia | 22 May 1902 | |
| Archduke Franz Ferdinand | Austria-Hungary | Archduke of Austria | 1 June 1902 | |
| Prince Eitel Friedrich | Prussia | Prince of Prussia | 6 June 1902 | |
| Don Carlos | Two Sicilies | Prince of Bourbon-Two Sicilies | 8 June 1902 | |
| Émile Loubet | France | President of France | 29 August 1902 | |
| Grand Duke Konstantin Konstantinovich | Russian Empire | Grand Duke of Russia | 7 September 1902 | |
| Prince Luigi Amedeo | Kingdom of Italy | Duke of the Abruzzi | 2 January 1904 | |
| Prince Adalbert | Prussia | Prince of Prussia | 26 November 1904 | |
| Prince Georg | Bavaria | Prince of Bavaria | 15 November 1906 | |
| Armand Fallières | France | President of France | 20 June 1907 | |
| King Gustaf VI Adolf (as Crown Prince of Sweden) | Sweden | King of Sweden | 25 October 1911 | |
| Prince Wilhelm, Duke of Södermanland | Sweden | Prince of Sweden | 25 October 1911 | |
| King Frederik IX (as Crown Prince of Denmark)^{a} | Denmark | King of Denmark | 29 February 1917 | |
| Raymond Poincaré | France | President of France | 1 August 1917 | |
| King Edward VIII (as Prince of Wales) | United Kingdom | King of the United Kingdom | 16 August 1917 | |
| Emperor Shōwa (as Crown Prince of Japan) | Japan | Emperor of Japan | 30 January 1925 | |
| Gaston Doumergue | France | President of France | 30 January 1925 | |
| Prince Knud | Denmark | Prince of Denmark | 13 February 1929 | |
| King Leopold III | Belgium | King of the Belgians | 16 February 1931 | |
| Empress Kōjun | Japan | Empress of Japan | 8 April 1931 | |
| King Umberto II (as Prince of Piedmont) | Kingdom of Italy | King of Italy | 26 March 1933 | |
| Albert François Lebrun | France | President of France | 19 April 1934 | |
| King George VI | United Kingdom | King of the United Kingdom | 2 February 1937 | |
| King Fuad I | Kingdom of Egypt | Muhammad Ali dynasty | 1934 | |
| Prince Yasuhito | Japan | Prince of Japan | 28 June 1939 | |
| Prince Henry | United Kingdom | Duke of Gloucester | 17 July 1939 | |
| Prince Axel | Denmark | Prince of Denmark | 20 January 1949 | |
| King Norodom Sihanouk | Cambodia | King of Cambodia | 15 December 1954 | |
| King Sisavang Vong | Kingdom of Laos | King of Laos | 1955 | |
| King Haile Selassie | (Ethiopian Empire) Ethiopia | Emperor of Ethiopia | 1958 | |
| Dwight D. Eisenhower | United States | President of the United States | 28 June 1960 | |
| Queen Elizabeth II | United Kingdom | Queen of the United Kingdom | 19 July 1960 | |
| Queen Ingrid | Denmark | Queen of Denmark | 6 September 1960 | |
| Queen Margrethe II (as Princess of Denmark) | Denmark | Queen of Denmark | 6 September 1960 | |
| King Olav V | Norway | King of Norway | 19 September 1960 | |
| King Harald V (as Crown Prince of Norway) | Norway | King of Norway | 19 September 1960 | |
| Queen Louise | Sweden | Queen consort of Sweden | 21 September 1960 | |
| Prince Bertil | Sweden | Duke of Halland | 21 September 1960 | |
| King Baudouin | Belgium | King of the Belgians | 4 October 1960 | |
| Queen Fabiola | Belgium | Queen consort of the Belgians | 1960 | |
| King Sisavang Vatthana | Kingdom of Laos | King of Laos | 1962 | |
| Charles de Gaulle | France | President of France | 11 October 1960 | |
| Grand Duchess Charlotte | Luxembourg | Grand Duchess of Luxembourg | 17 October 1965 | |
| Prince Felix | Luxembourg | Prince consort of Luxembourg | 17 October 1960 | |
| Grand Duke Jean (as Hereditary Grand Duke) | Luxembourg | Grand Duke of Luxembourg | 17 October 1960 | |
| Queen Juliana | Netherlands | Queen of the Netherlands | 24 October 1960 | |
| Prince Bernhard | Netherlands | Prince consort of the Netherlands | 24 October 1960 | |
| Queen Beatrix (as Princess Beatrix) | Netherlands | Queen of the Netherlands | 24 October 1960 | |
| Queen Frederica | Greece | Queen consort of Greece | 14 February 1963 | |
| King Constantine II of Greece | Greece | King of Greece | 14 February 1963 | |
| Emperor Akihito (as Crown Prince of Japan) | Japan | Emperor of Japan | 27 May 1963 | |
| Empress Michiko (as Crown Princess of Japan) | Japan | Empress of Japan | 27 May 1963 | |
| Empress Farah | Iran | Empress consort of Iran | 22 January 1968 | |
| Shah Mohammad Reza Pahlavi | Iran | Shah of Iran | 23 April 1968 | |
| King Juan Carlos I | Spain | King of Spain | 22 February 2006 | |
| Queen Sofía | Spain | Queen consort of Spain | 22 February 2006 | |
| Sultan Abdul Halim of Kedah | Malaysia | Yang di-Pertuan Agong of Malaysia | 30 January 2013 | |

== Notes ==
- ^a Incorrectly referred to as Christian, Crown Prince of Denmark in the gazette.
