= Chalermbol Dighambara =

Saint Gabriel's College

His father was a royal son of King Chulalongkorn (Rama V) and Princess Saisavali Bhiromya. His mother was a niece of King Chulalongkorn, being the daughter of Bhanurangsi Savangwongse, who was a full younger brother of King Chulalongkorn.

King Prajadhipok (Rama VII) graciously commanded that a royal topknot-cutting ceremony (Sokan) be held at the Grand Palace on March 29, 1925. After the King poured the holy water from the royal conch and performed the initial symbolic cut with the royal scissors, he graciously permitted Prince Bhanurangsi Savangwongse and Narisara Nuvadtivongs to perform the subsequent clips respectively.

Major General Prince Chalermbol Dighambara was an alumnus of Debsirin School and the Royal Military Academy (Primary Section) in the year 1923. Afterwards, he went to study in the United Kingdom at Eton College. On April 11, 1930, he received the royal grace of King Prajadhipok, who anointed him and poured royal holy water from the conch upon his audience to take leave to study in England. He traveled alongside Prince Damrong Rajanubhab. He studied military science at the Royal Military College, Sandhurst, and successfully completed the commissioned officer course. Following his graduation, he returned to Thailand to join the military service and was appointed to the Royal Thai Army Headquarters with the rank of Acting Second Lieutenant. Later, he transferred to become a police officer under the Thonburi Metropolitan Police Division, Metropolitan Police Bureau, until 1948. He then transferred back to serve in the Royal Thai Army until his retirement at the rank of Colonel, attached to the Cavalry Center. Afterwards, he received the royal grace of King Bhumibol Adulyadej (Rama IX), who promoted him to the rank of Major General on October 26, 1988.

== Education ==
- Studied under the abbot at Wat Matchimawat, Songkhla, with his most prominent teacher being Phra Rattanatachamuni (Chu Issarayano).
- Debsirin School
- Saint Gabriel's College, Bangkok
- Eton College

=== Military Training ===
- Chulachomklao Royal Military Academy
- Royal Military College, Sandhurst
- Cavalry Officer Advanced Course (Class 2), Cavalry School, Cavalry Center
- Studied and observed operations at the Armor School and the Special Warfare Center of the United States Army
- Senior Officer Parachute Course (Class 1), Special Warfare Command, Royal Thai Army

== Work and career ==
=== Military and police service ===
Upon completing his education in the United Kingdom, Prince Chalermbol Dighambara returned to Thailand and entered military service in the Royal Thai Army, being commissioned to the Royal Thai Army Headquarters as an Acting Second Lieutenant. He later transferred to serve as a police officer under the Thonburi Metropolitan Police Division, Metropolitan Police Bureau, until 1948. After that, he transferred back to the Royal Thai Army, where he served until his retirement at the rank of Colonel, attached to the Cavalry Center. Furthermore, during his military service, he played a key role as a spearhead in pursuing Pridi Banomyong during the 1947 Thai coup d'état. He requested an aircraft to track and attack Pridi and his party who were escaping by water, a request granted by the coup council. Prince Chalermbol Dighambara, along with Lieutenant Colonel Lamai Uthayananon (rank at the time), boarded a Royal Thai Air Force aircraft from Don Mueang, heading straight to Samut Prakan to track Pridi's escape boat. They conducted aerial searches from Pak Nam deep into the Chao Phraya River, widely across the mouth of the bay, and out into the sea. However, they could not locate Pridi's vessel due to heavily overcast skies and unusually strong winds, which deteriorated visibility to the point where the aircraft had to abort the search. Ultimately, Pridi Banomyong successfully escaped Thailand.

In 1950, while holding the rank of Captain, he joined the 21st Combined Regiment to fight alongside United Nations forces in the Korean War. He served on the front lines for two years and was awarded the Victory Medal, subsequently receiving the Bravery Flash on his Victory Medal ribbon in 1952 in recognition of official commendation. In addition, the United States Army presented him with the Bronze Star Medal for highly successful operations during the joint UN military campaign in Korea.

After returning from his United Nations assignment in the Korean War, King Bhumibol Adulyadej graciously promoted him to the military rank of Lieutenant Colonel on April 23, 1952. In 1950, Prince Chalermbol Dighambara wrote letters to his family describing his journey to fight with the United Nations in Korea. In his first letter, he mentioned making a vow to the spirit shrine of Prince Abhakara Kiartivongse, Prince of Chumphon, at Nang Loeng Palace to ensure a safe sea voyage. He requested Mom Thongthaem Yugala na Ayudhaya to fulfill the vow on his behalf, writing:

"Tomorrow the ship will stop at Okinawa, an American naval base, to pick up provisions. Our ship has to travel slower than usual because we must wait for the Sichang ship, which is an old vessel that sails very slowly, and we have hit very strong waves and winds... We encountered typhoons several times along the way, but every time we prayed to the Prince of Chumphon, it completely quieted down. It is very sacred. Please bring some liquor to fulfill the vow at his shrine at the palace for me too (Yugala, 1991, P. 150)."

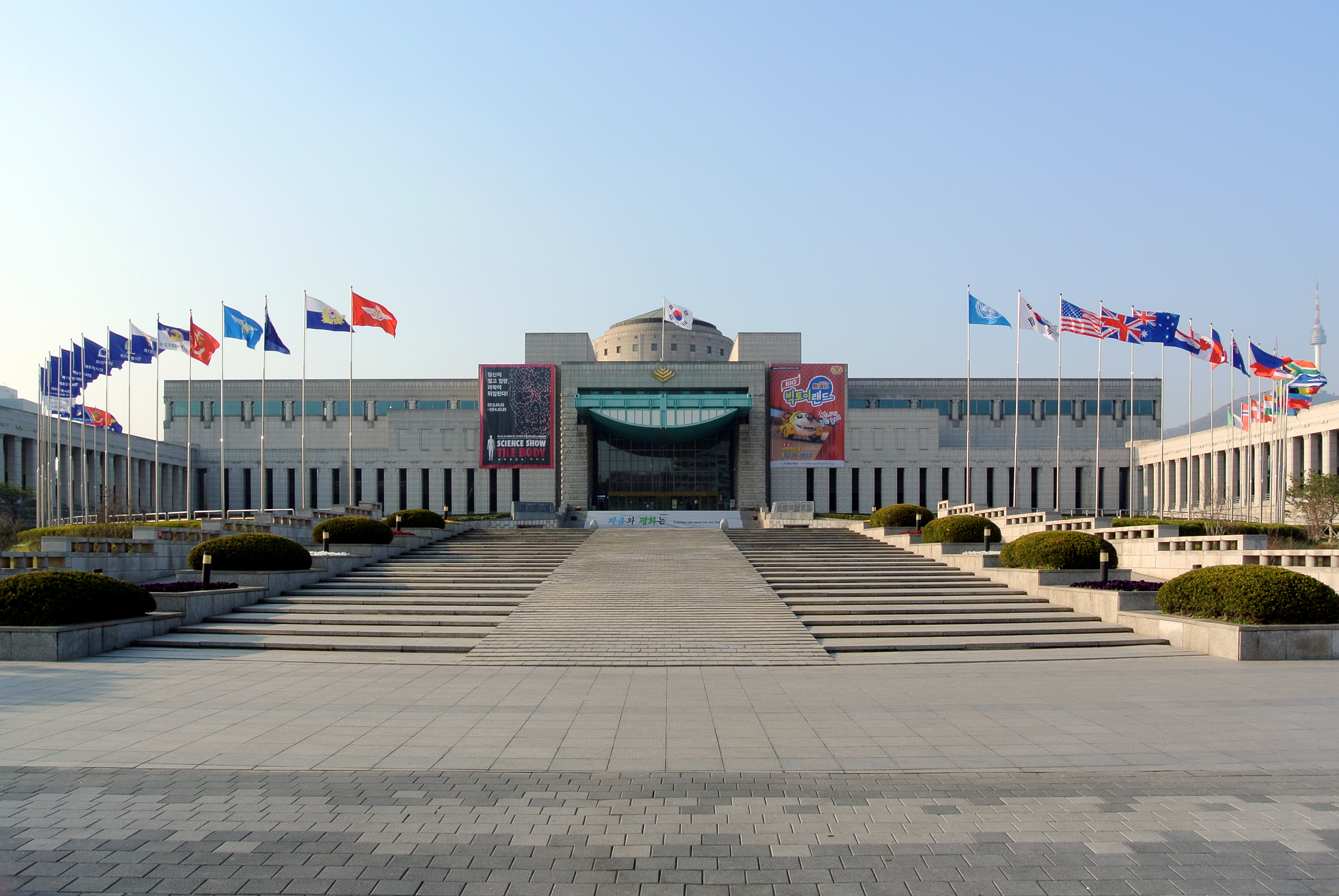
War Memorial of Korea Main Building

Furthermore, Prince Chalermbol Dighambara received the royal grace of King Bhumibol Adulyadej, who appointed him as a Special Officer attached to the 1st Cavalry Regiment, King's Guard, on April 18, 1955, and he was promoted to the rank of Major General on October 26, 1988.

==== Thai Performing Arts ====
Prince Chalermbol Dighambara was a royal figure highly knowledgeable and passionate about arts and literature, providing consistent patronage and support to both the arts and artists. He encouraged Dhanit Yupho to continue writing about the art of Khon (masked dance-drama) after Dhanit had written on the subject years prior. He ordered the publication of the book "The Art of Thai Dance Drama" or "A Manual of Thai Performing Arts" (1st edition) by Dhanit Yupho for his own 5th-cycle (60th) birthday celebration on April 29, 1973. Prince Chalermbol Dighambara also kindly entrusted Mr. Chaeng Khlaisithong to learn Sepha (Thai narrative poetry chanting) from Master Chuea. As a result, Mr. Chaeng acquired the traditional method of chanting the Sepha Wai Khru ritual, along with various traditional techniques. Eventually, he became the famous Chaeng Khlaisithong known to Thai classical music and Sepha listeners nationwide, earning the moniker "Chang Khap Kham Hom" (The Sweet-Voiced Singer).

Due to his expertise, various writers and artists requested him to accept the presidency of the Writers' Association of Thailand, a position he held from 1971 to 1975.

After Prince Chakrabandhu Pensiri Yugala took up a position as a Privy Councilor, Prince Chalermbol Dighambara was invited by Eua Sunthornsanan and his committee to serve as the president of the Music Association of Thailand under Royal Patronage, and he remained its Honorary Life President.

Additionally, Prince Chalermbol Dighambara founded a theatrical troupe named the "Nataraj Troupe". He expressed a wish to Master Boonyong Ketkong, a highly skilled Thai classical musician at the time, to compose a theme song for his troupe. Master Boonyong Ketkong composed it according to his wishes by adopting the melody of "Dap Khuan Thian," the final song in the sacred Wai Khru suite "Phleng Rueang Wien Thian Yai", which is considered highly auspicious. He adapted it into a "Phleng Tra" format, using a two-tier rhythmic cycle to produce a new sacred overture song (Phleng Na Phat) named "Tra Nataraj" and presented it to Prince Chalermbol Dighambara. Later, the Tra Nataraj song was used for the first time on television on Thai TV Channel 4 Bang Khun Phrom. Before any play by the Nataraj Troupe was broadcast, the sound of the Tra Nataraj song would play along with the credits of the director, actors, producers, and sponsors, serving as the signature opening for the troupe. Generally, in Thai music and dance initiation rituals (Wai Khru), old traditional Na Phat songs are used throughout the ceremony, but the Tra Nataraj song also came to be used in initiation rituals as well. This practice began among the students of Master Boonyong Ketkong, who used it as an initiation overture, though it is played only when the ritual master specifically calls for it, a tradition continuing among his disciples to this day.

Aside from his talents in performing arts, Prince Chalermbol Dighambara was deeply connected to the legendary creation of the Luang Pu Thuat amulets of Wat Chang Hai. He maintained a close friendship with a prominent southern businessman, Khun Anan Khananurak, and received a 1954 powder-based Luang Pu Thuat amulet from him, which he regularly wore. Once, his royal vehicle overturned in an accident, but the Prince emerged completely unharmed without a single scratch. This inspired an immense faith in Luang Pu Thuat of Wat Chang Hai. When the temple, led by Phra Achan Thim and Khun Anan Khananurak, planned to create the 1962 edition of Luang Pu Thuat amulets, the Prince offered himself as the chief patron of the project. He brought sacred metal materials to melt and cast into various metal amulets in Bangkok, which became the renowned 1962 Luang Pu Thuat model that remains celebrated to this day. Because Prince Chalermbol served as the patron, the creation was highly successful, and he also commissioned the casting of a beautifully styled "Phra Kring" amulet during that occasion. He had a craftsman carve the mold, and the casting was blessed by Phra Achan Thim of Wat Chang Hai alongside the 1962 Luang Pu Thuat amulets. Following the ceremony, the Prince donated 300 of these exquisitely formed Phra Kring amulets to Wat Chang Hai, which came to be known as "Phra Kring Yai Luang Pu Thuat" or "Phra Kring Wat Chang Hai". The remaining amulets were brought to Wat Ta Kong, as Prince Chalermbol Dighambara had initiated himself as a chief disciple of Luang Pho Chaem of Wat Ta Kong. They were blessed for another session by sacred monks of Nakhon Pathom, and people called them "Phra Kring Chalermbol". Additionally, on the occasion of the bicentennial celebration of the birth of Somdej Phra Buddhacharn (To Brahmaramsi), Prince Chalermbol Dighambara served as the chairman of the celebratory festival, which included a historic mass-consecration of the 1988 Bicentennial Memorial Somdej amulets by master monks from across the country.

== Death ==
Prince Chalermbol Dighambara passed away on October 1, 1991, due to heart failure, at the age of 78. On this occasion, King Bhumibol Adulyadej graciously commanded the royal bathing water for the body and granted a Mondop-styled royal urn, a set of royal umbrellas, and a gilded decorative platform (Waen Fa) to honor the Prince. His body lay in state at the Bhanurangsi Pavilion of Wat Debsirindrawas Ratchaworawihan. The King also graciously traveled to preside over the royal cremation ceremony of Major General Prince Chalermbol Dighambara at the Royal Crematorium in Front of the Issariyaphorn Pavilion, Wat Debsirindrawas, Bangkok, on Saturday, February 1, 1992.

Following his passing, in 2016, the Ministry of Culture posthumously honored Prince Chalermbol Dighambara as a "Master Artist of the Rattanakosin Era (Absolute Monarchy Period) in the Field of Performing Arts". This honor recognizes deceased artists who made prominent contributions to the nation's cultural heritage, which are well-acknowledged by society and highly worthy of respect, paving the way for later generations to preserve and develop. On this occasion, Princess Maha Chakri Sirindhorn graciously granted the title for these deceased artists as "Burapha Sinlapin" (Master Artists of the Past).

== National honours ==
=== National honours ===
- Knight of the Most Illustrious Order of the Royal House of Chakri
- Knight Grand Cross of the Most Noble Order of the Crown of Thailand
- Knight Grand Commander of the Most Illustrious Order of Chula Chom Klao
- Commander of the Most Exalted Order of the White Elephant
- Victory Medal - Korean War with flames
- Medal for Service Rendered in the Interior – Pacific War
- Chakra Mala Medal
- King Rama VI Royal Cypher Medal, 3rd Class
- King Rama VII Royal Cypher Medal, 3rd Class
- King Rama IX Royal Cypher Medal, 2nd Class
- King Rama VII Coronation Medal
- King Rama IX Coronation Medal
- Commemorative Medal on the Occasion of the 150th Years of Rattanakosin Celebration
- Red Cross Medal of Appreciation, Gold Medal

=== Foreign honours ===
- Bronze Star Medal
- United Nations Service Medal Korea
- Korean Presidential Unit Citation

== Ancestry ==
Family of Chalermbol Dighambara

16. (=24.) King Buddha Loetla Nabhalai (Rama II)
8. (=12.) King Mongkut (Rama IV)
17. (=25.) Queen Sri Suriyendra
4. King Chulalongkorn (Rama V)
18. (=26.) Siriwongse, Prince Matayaphakdi
9. (=13.) Queen Debsirindra
19. (=27.) Mom Noi Siriwongse na Ayudhaya
2. Yugala Dighambara, Prince of Lopburi
20. King Nangklao (Rama III)
10. Ladavalya, Prince Bhuminthraphakdi
21. Chom Manda Eamnoi
5. Princess Saisavali Bhiromya
22. Sae
11. Chom Manda Chin
1. Chalermbol Dighambara
24. (=16.) King Buddha Loetla Nabhalai (Rama II)
12. (=8.) King Mongkut (Rama IV)
25. (=17.) Queen Sri Suriyendra
6. Bhanurangsi Savangwongse
26. (=18.) Siriwongse, Prince Matayaphakdi
13. (=9.) Queen Debsirindra
27. (=19.) Mom Noi Siriwongse na Ayudhaya
3. Chalermkhetra Mangala
28. Somdej Chao Phraya Sri Suriyawongse (Chuang Bunnag)
14. Chao Phraya Surawong Waiyawat (Won Bunnag)
29. Klin Bunnag
7. Mom Maen Bhanubandhu na Ayudhaya
15. Than Phu Ying Im Surawong Waiyawat
