= Nabhachara Chamrassri =

Princess of Siam, daughter of Chulalongkorn

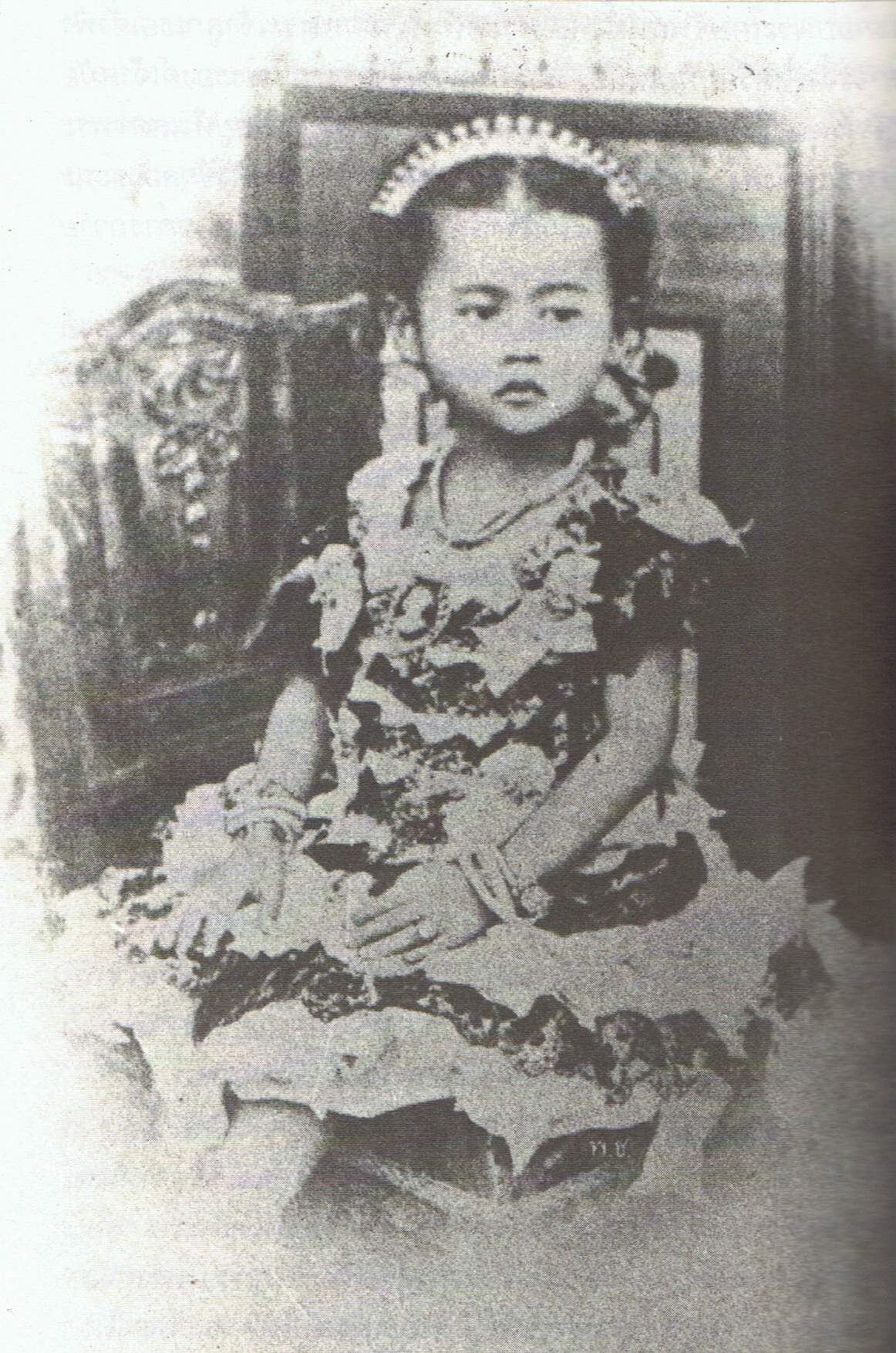
- Born: 5 May 1884; Grand Palace, Bangkok, Siam
- Died: 31 August 1889 (aged 5); Grand Palace, Bangkok, Siam
- House: Chakri dynasty
- Father: Chulalongkorn (Rama V)
- Mother: Saisavali Bhiromya

Nabhachara Chamrassri (Thai: นภาจรจำรัสศรี; RTGS: Naphachonchamratsi; 5 May 1884 – 31 August 1889), was the Princess of Siam (later Thailand). She was a member of the Siamese royal family. She was a daughter of Chulalongkorn.

Her mother was Saisavali Bhiromya, daughter of Prince Ladavalya, the Prince Bhumindra Bhakdi and Lady Chin. She was given her full name by her father as Nabhachara Chamrassri Bhadravadi Rajadhida (Thai: นภาจรจำรัสศรี ภัทราวดีราชธิดา}; RTGS: Naphachonchamratsi Pattharawadiratchathida)

She had 3 siblings; an elder brother, and 2 younger sisters:

- Prince Yugala Dighambara, the Prince of Lopburi (17 March 1883 – 8 April 1932)
- Princess Malini Nobhadara, the Princess of Srisatchanalai (31 July 1885 – 22 December 1924)
- Princess Nibha Nobhadol, the Princess of Uthong (4 December 1886 – 29 January 1935)

Princess Nabhachara Chamrassri died in her childhood on 31 August 1889, at age 5.

== Ancestry ==
Ancestor of Princess Nabhachara Chamrassri
Princess Nabhachara Chamrassri	Father: Chulalongkorn, King Rama V of Siam	Paternal Grandfather: Mongkut, King Rama IV of Siam	Paternal Great-grandfather: Buddha Loetla Nabhalai, King Rama II of Siam
Princess Nabhachara Chamrassri	Father: Chulalongkorn, King Rama V of Siam	Paternal Grandfather: Mongkut, King Rama IV of Siam	Paternal Great-grandmother: Queen Sri Suriyendra
Princess Nabhachara Chamrassri	Father: Chulalongkorn, King Rama V of Siam	Paternal Grandmother: Queen Debsirindra	Paternal Great-grandfather: Prince Sirivongse, the Prince Matayabidaksa
Princess Nabhachara Chamrassri	Father: Chulalongkorn, King Rama V of Siam	Paternal Grandmother: Queen Debsirindra	Paternal Great-grandmother: Mom Noi Sirivongs na Ayudhya
Princess Nabhachara Chamrassri	Mother: Princess Saisavalibhirom, the Princess Suddhasininat Piyamaharaj Padivarada	Maternal Grandfather: Prince Ladavalya, the Prince Bhumindrabhakdi	Maternal Great-grandfather: Nangklao, King Rama III of Siam
Princess Nabhachara Chamrassri	Mother: Princess Saisavalibhirom, the Princess Suddhasininat Piyamaharaj Padivarada	Maternal Grandfather: Prince Ladavalya, the Prince Bhumindrabhakdi	Maternal Great-grandmother: Chao Chom Manda Emnoi
Princess Nabhachara Chamrassri	Mother: Princess Saisavalibhirom, the Princess Suddhasininat Piyamaharaj Padivarada	Maternal Grandmother: Mom Chin Ladavalya na Ayudhya	Maternal Great-grandfather: unknown
Princess Nabhachara Chamrassri	Mother: Princess Saisavalibhirom, the Princess Suddhasininat Piyamaharaj Padivarada	Maternal Grandmother: Mom Chin Ladavalya na Ayudhya	Maternal Great-grandmother: unknown
