= Malini Nobhadara =

Princess of Srisatchanalai (1885–1924)

- Princess of Srisatchanalai
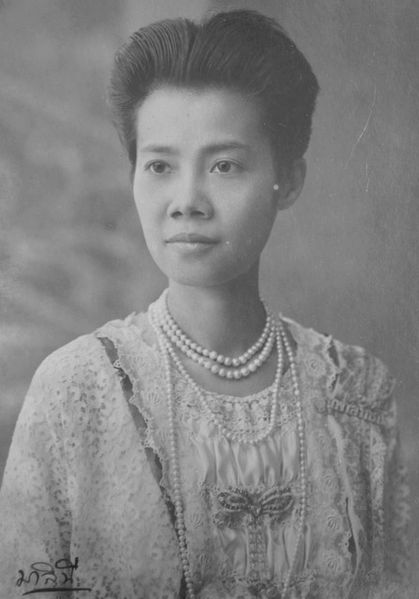
- Born: 31 July 1885; Grand Palace, Bangkok, Siam
- Died: 22 December 1924 (aged 39); Bangkok, Siam
Names
- Malini Nobhadara Sirinibha Bannavadi
- House: Chakri dynasty
- Father: Chulalongkorn (Rama V)
- Mother: Saisavali Bhiromya

Malini Nobhadara, Princess of Srisatchanalai (Thai: มาลินีนภดารา; RTGS: Malini Nopphadara; 31 July 1885 – 22 December 1924), was the Princess of Siam (later Thailand). She was a member of Siamese royal family. She is a daughter of Chulalongkorn, King Rama V of Siam.

She was the second daughter and the third child of King Chulalongkorn (Rama V the Great) of Siam and Princess Saisavali Bhiromya, the Princess Suddhasininat Piyamaharaj Padivarada, daughter of Prince Ladavalya, the Prince Bhumindrabhakdi and Mom Chin Ladavalya na Ayudhya. She was given full name by her father as Malini Nobhadara Sirinibha Bannavadi (Thai: มาลินีนภดารา ศิรินิภาพรรณวดี)

She had 3 siblings; an elder brother, an elder sister and a younger sister:

- Prince Yugala Dighambara, the Prince of Lopburi (17 March 1883 – 8 April 1932)
- Princess Nabhachara Chamrassri (5 May 1884 – 31 August 1889)
- Princess Nibha Nobhadol, the Princess of Uthong (4 December 1886 – 29 January 1935)

Princess Malini Nobhadara died on 22 December 1924, at the age of 39. After she died, on 11 January 1926, her half-brother, King Vajiravudh (Rama VI) gave her a royal title as, The Princess of Srisatchanalai, or translated in Thai as Krom Khun Srisatchanalai Surakanya (Thai: กรมขุนศรีสัชนาลัยสุรกัญญา). She was given the rank of Krom Khun, the 4th level of the Krom ranks.

== Royal decorations ==
- Dame of The Ancient and Auspicious Order of the Nine Gems
- Dame of The Most Illustrious Order of the Royal House of Chakri: received 7 February 1896
- Dame Cross of the Most Illustrious Order of Chula Chom Klao (First class): received 11 November 1895
- King Rama V Royal Cypher Medal, First Class
- King Rama VI Royal Cypher Medal, First Class

== Ancestry ==
Ancestor of Princess Malini Nobhadara, the Princess of Srisatchanalai Surakanya
Princess Malini Nobhadara, the Princess of Srisatchanalai	Father: Chulalongkorn, King Rama V of Siam	Paternal Grandfather: Mongkut, King Rama IV of Siam	Paternal Great-grandfather: Buddha Loetla Nabhalai, King Rama II of Siam
Princess Malini Nobhadara, the Princess of Srisatchanalai	Father: Chulalongkorn, King Rama V of Siam	Paternal Grandfather: Mongkut, King Rama IV of Siam	Paternal Great-grandmother: Queen Sri Suriyendra
Princess Malini Nobhadara, the Princess of Srisatchanalai	Father: Chulalongkorn, King Rama V of Siam	Paternal Grandmother: Queen Debsirindra	Paternal Great-grandfather: Prince Sirivongse, the Prince Matayabidaksa
Princess Malini Nobhadara, the Princess of Srisatchanalai	Father: Chulalongkorn, King Rama V of Siam	Paternal Grandmother: Queen Debsirindra	Paternal Great-grandmother: Mom Noi Sirivongs na Ayudhya
Princess Malini Nobhadara, the Princess of Srisatchanalai	Mother: Princess Saisavalibhirom, the Princess Suddhasininat Piyamaharaj Padivarada	Maternal Grandfather: Prince Ladavalya, the Prince Bhumindrabhakdi	Maternal Great-grandfather: Nangklao, King Rama III of Siam
Princess Malini Nobhadara, the Princess of Srisatchanalai	Mother: Princess Saisavalibhirom, the Princess Suddhasininat Piyamaharaj Padivarada	Maternal Grandfather: Prince Ladavalya, the Prince Bhumindrabhakdi	Maternal Great-grandmother: Chao Chom Manda Emnoi
Princess Malini Nobhadara, the Princess of Srisatchanalai	Mother: Princess Saisavalibhirom, the Princess Suddhasininat Piyamaharaj Padivarada	Maternal Grandmother: Mom Chin Ladavalya na Ayudhya	Maternal Great-grandfather: unknown
Princess Malini Nobhadara, the Princess of Srisatchanalai	Mother: Princess Saisavalibhirom, the Princess Suddhasininat Piyamaharaj Padivarada	Maternal Grandmother: Mom Chin Ladavalya na Ayudhya	Maternal Great-grandmother: unknown
