= Bhanurangsi Savangwongse =

Thai prince (1859–1928)

- Prince Bhanubandhu Vongsevoradej
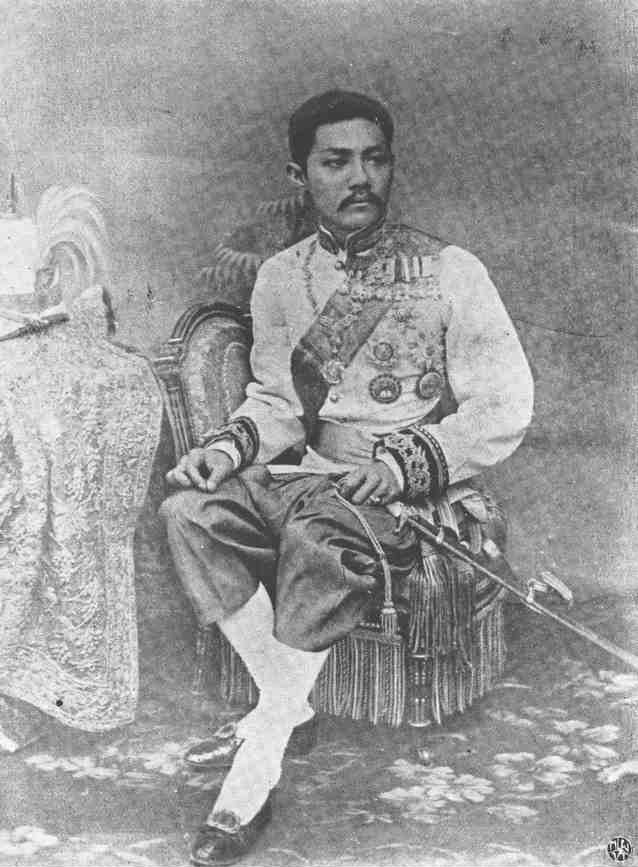
- Prince Bhanurangsi in 1881

Chief of Joint Operations Department
- In office 1892–1896
- Preceded by: Surasakmontri
- Succeeded by: Chitcharoen
- In office 1899–1901
- Preceded by: Chitcharoen
- Succeeded by: Chirapravati Voradej

Chief of Navy Department
- In office 17 February 1902 – 24 February 1903; Acting: 29 January 1901 – 17 February 1902
- Preceded by: Andreas du Plessis de Richelieu
- Succeeded by: Paribatra Sukhumbandhu

Director-General of the Siamese Navy
- In office 19 June 1920 – 31 August 1922
- Preceded by: Paribatra Sukhumbandhu (as Minister of Navy)
- Succeeded by: Abhakara Kiartivongse (as Minister of Navy)
- Born: 11 January 1859; Bangkok, Siam
- Died: 13 June 1928 (aged 68); Bangkok, Siam
- Spouse: Maen Bunnag; Liam Supphasut; Sun Paksiwongsa; Lap Chatikkarat; Lek Yongchaiyudh; Yiam na Bangxang; Yoi Komarakul
- Issue more...: Princess Dibyasambandh; Princess Chalermkhetra Mangala; Prince Birabongse Bhanudej
- House: Bhanubandh (Chakri dynasty)
- Father: Mongkut (Rama IV)
- Mother: Debsirindra
- Military career
- Allegiance: Kingdom of Siam
- Branch: Royal Siamese Army; Royal Siamese Navy
- Rank: Field Marshal; Admiral of the Fleet

Prince Bhanurangsi Savangwongse, The Prince Bhanubandhu Vongsevoradej or His Royal Highness Prince Bhanurangsi Savangwongse, Prince Uncle (11 January 1859 – 13 June 1928) (Thai: สมเด็จพระราชปิตุลาบรมพงศาภิมุข เจ้าฟ้าภาณุรังษีสว่างวงศ์ กรมพระยาภาณุพันธุวงศ์วรเดช) was a son of King Mongkut of Siam and Queen Debsirindra.

Although the Prince held a number of posts in the government of his elder brother, King Chulalongkorn, including the post of Commander-in-Chief of the Royal Siamese Army, he is best remembered as the founder of the Thai postal service and the first Field marshal in Royal Siamese Army during King Vajiravudh.

His most famous son was the Formula One racer, Prince Birabongse Bhanudej.

== Early life and education ==
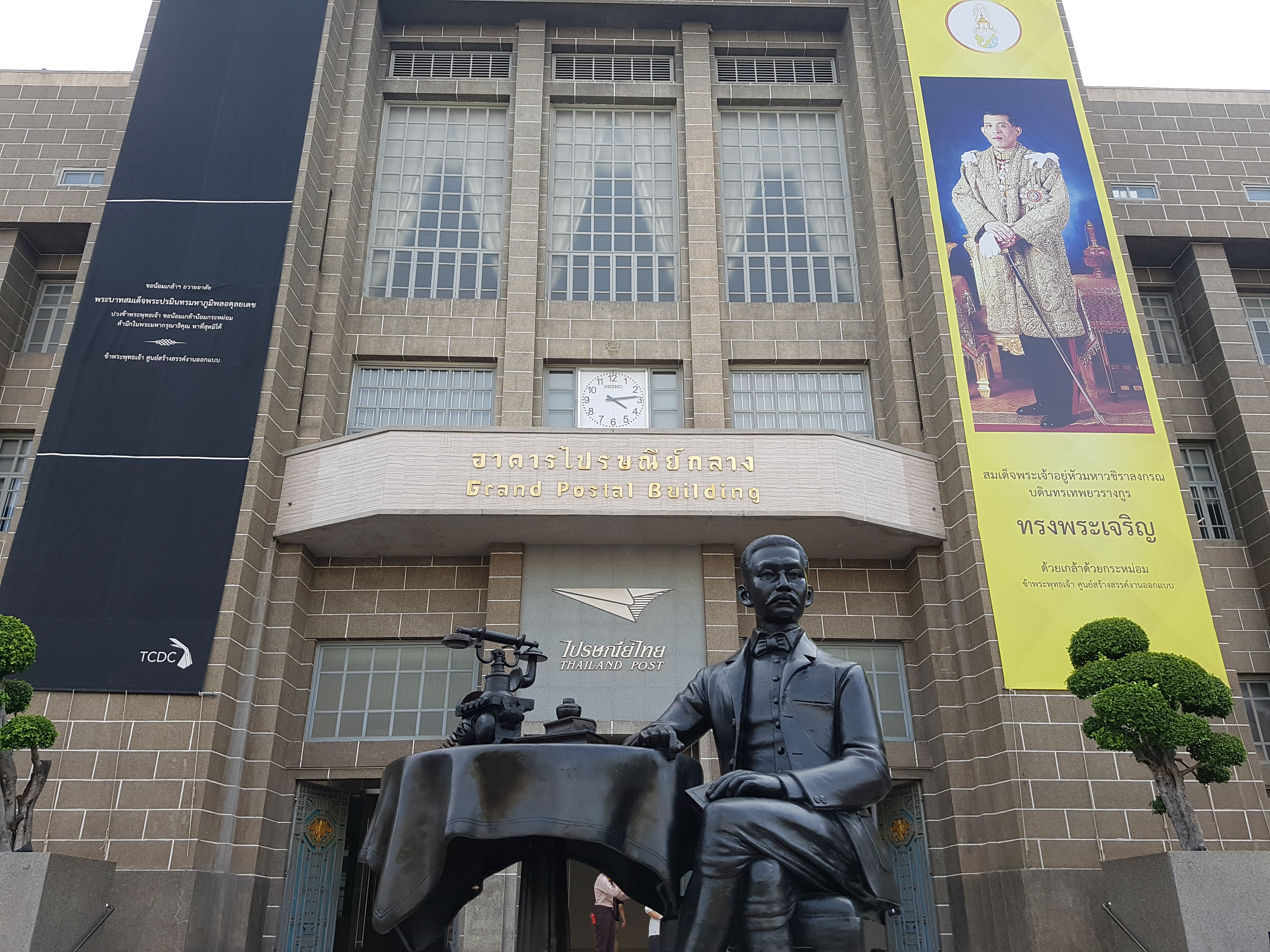
Prince Bhanurangsi Savangwongse statue in front of General Post Office (Bangkok)

His Royal Highness Prince Bhanurangsi Savangwongse born on 11 January 1860 at the Grand Palace, Bangkok. He has 3 brothers and sisters, including King Chulalongkorn, Princess Chandrmondol and Prince Chaturonrasmi. After 2 years, his mother died. Later, his father died when he was 10 years old. He was the scatterer of rice in the procession of the royal funeral of King Mongkut. When he was 12 years old King Chulalongkorn appointed him as Prince Brother, with a royal ceremony at the Dusit Maha Prasat Throne Hall. When he was 13 years old he was ordained as a novice at Wat Phra Kaew with Supreme Patriarch Pavares Variyalongkorn as a preceptor then went out to Wat Bowonniwet Vihara.

He began his studies in the school of female teachers and began to study by himself. After that, he studied the books of Khmer and Pali at the Bureau of Phraya Priyatthi Dhammada when he is ordained. After that, he studied military education at the Bureau of the King's Guard since 1872 and learning the Thai language from Phraya Srisoonthorn Waham (Noi Ajarayangkul) including studying civil service traditions and royal traditions from Prince Mahamala, the Prince Bamrapporapak.

== Careers ==
He carried out military service in a special officer rank, with a first lieutenant's uniform in Bureau of the King's Guard when King Chulalongkorn travelled to Singapore (2nd time) and Burma, parts of England throughout India including the rising districts of Siam along the western coast of Malaya. He held positions including Minister of the Council and Privy Council of King Chulalongkorn, Chancellor of the Ministry of Defense, The Privy Council of King Rama VI and the President and Privy Councilor in King Rama VII, Inspector General, Commander of the Navy Department and Director-General of the Post and Telegraph Department.

== Death ==
Prince Bhanurangsi Savangwongse died on 13 June 1928 at Buraphaphirom Palace.

== Issue ==
He had 16 children, 9 sons and 7 daughters:

Name	Birth	Death	Marriage		Their children
Name	Birth	Death	Date	Spouse	Their children
By Man Bunnag
Nibanna Bhanubongse, Prince Bhanubongse Biriyadej	7 September 1885	22 August 1934 (aged 48)	26 October 1917	Princess Vilayakulya Devakula	Prince Bhanudevan Bhanubandhu
Nibanna Bhanubongse, Prince Bhanubongse Biriyadej	7 September 1885	22 August 1934 (aged 48)	Concubine	Paew	Savanna Vichairat
Nibanna Bhanubongse, Prince Bhanubongse Biriyadej	7 September 1885	22 August 1934 (aged 48)	Concubine	Arun Pheng-iam	Prince Bhanbhanu Bhanubandhu
Nibanna Bhanubongse, Prince Bhanubongse Biriyadej	7 September 1885	22 August 1934 (aged 48)	Concubine	Arun Pheng-iam	Princess Arunkhaiseang Bhanubandhu
Nibanna Bhanubongse, Prince Bhanubongse Biriyadej	7 September 1885	22 August 1934 (aged 48)	Concubine	Mali Sukcharoen	Prabhabhadhu Konkosiyakaj
Nibanna Bhanubongse, Prince Bhanubongse Biriyadej	7 September 1885	22 August 1934 (aged 48)	Concubine	Mali Sukcharoen	Prince Suriyabhandhu Bhanubandhu
Nibanna Bhanubongse, Prince Bhanubongse Biriyadej	7 September 1885	22 August 1934 (aged 48)	Concubine	Mali Sukcharoen	Phanwarophat Svetarundra
Nibanna Bhanubongse, Prince Bhanubongse Biriyadej	7 September 1885	22 August 1934 (aged 48)	Concubine	Phayao Nayaphan	Prince Niphathabhandhubongse Bhanubandhu
Nibanna Bhanubongse, Prince Bhanubongse Biriyadej	7 September 1885	22 August 1934 (aged 48)	Concubine	Phayao Nayaphan	Princess Uthaikanya Bhanubandhu
Prince Siriwongse Vadhanadej	7 March 1889	5 May 1909 (aged 20)	None		None
Princess Chaloemkhetmongkhon	10 March 1892	23 January 1957 (aged 64)	22 November 1907	Yugala Dighambara, Prince of Lopburi	Prince Bhanubandhu Yugala
Princess Chaloemkhetmongkhon	10 March 1892	23 January 1957 (aged 64)	22 November 1907	Yugala Dighambara, Prince of Lopburi	Prince Chalermbol Dighambara
Princess Chaloemkhetmongkhon	10 March 1892	23 January 1957 (aged 64)	22 November 1907	Yugala Dighambara, Prince of Lopburi	Prince Anusorn Mongkolkarn
By Liam Suphasut
Princess Dibyasambandh	17 May 1885	26 July 1908 (aged 23)	28 February 1901	Abhakara Kiartivongse, Prince of Chumphon	Prince Kiart Abhakara
Princess Dibyasambandh	17 May 1885	26 July 1908 (aged 23)	28 February 1901	Abhakara Kiartivongse, Prince of Chumphon	Prince Aditya Dibabha
Princess Dibyasambandh	17 May 1885	26 July 1908 (aged 23)	28 February 1901	Abhakara Kiartivongse, Prince of Chumphon	Prince Rangsiyakorn Abhakara
By Sun Paksiwongsa
Prince Suriyon Yiembayab	14 September 1894	19 September 1912 (aged 18)	None		None
By Lap Chatikarat
Prince Ballap Danaya	16 September 1899	2 July 1901 (aged 1)	None		None
By Lek Yongchaiyudh
Princess Khaimuk Bhanubandhu	23 April 1904	29 December 1904 (aged 0)	None		None
Princess Rambhai Prabha	25 July 1907	14 June 1979 (aged 71)	Unknown	Prince Thaniseksangat Jumbala	Mom Rajawongse Rueng-amphai Isarankura
Princess Rambhai Prabha	25 July 1907	14 June 1979 (aged 71)	Unknown	Prince Thaniseksangat Jumbala	Mom Rajawongse Hathaithani Jumbala
Prince Aphassorawongse	20 June 1909	24 June 1982 (aged 73)	1943; Divorced 1950	Mani Bunnag	Mom Rajawongse Ornmani Niwetmarin
Prince Aphassorawongse	20 June 1909	24 June 1982 (aged 73)	Unknown	Amphai Seangsuk	Mom Rajawongse Bhandhurangsri Bhanubandhu
Prince Aphassorawongse	20 June 1909	24 June 1982 (aged 73)	Unknown	Amphai Seangsuk	Mom Rajawongse Sudaratana na Nagara
Prince Birabongse Bhanudej	15 July 1914	23 December 1985 (aged 71)	12 January 1938; Divorced 1949	Ceril Heycock	None
Prince Birabongse Bhanudej	15 July 1914	23 December 1985 (aged 71)	18 December 1951; Divorced 1956	Celia Howard	Mom Rajawongse Biradej Bhanubandh
Prince Birabongse Bhanudej	15 July 1914	23 December 1985 (aged 71)	1959; Divorced 1964	Arunee Chuladakoson	None
Prince Birabongse Bhanudej	15 July 1914	23 December 1985 (aged 71)	1967; Divorced 1980	Chuanchom Chaiyananda	Mom Rajawongse Rabibara Bhanubandh
Prince Birabongse Bhanudej	15 July 1914	23 December 1985 (aged 71)	1967; Divorced 1980	Chuanchom Chaiyananda	Mom Rajawongse Biranubongse Bhanubandh
Prince Norasetdha Suriyalaksana	9 December 1915	22 March 1954 (aged 38)	None		None
Prince Chirasakdi Suprabhas	4 September 1918	12 September 1942 (aged 24)	22 September 1938	Mani Bunnag	Mom Rajawongse Dejanasakdi Sakdidejna Bhanubandhu
Prince Chirasakdi Suprabhas	4 September 1918	12 September 1942 (aged 24)	22 September 1938	Mani Bunnag	Mom Rajawongse Thim Sakdidejna Bhanubandhu
Princess Lek Bhanubandhu	5 September 1919	11 September 1919 (aged 0)	None		None
Unknown mother
Unnamed Princess	17 November 1891	1 December 1891 (aged 0)	None		None
Prince Daeng Bhanubandhu	23 April 1904	23 April 1904 (aged 0)	None		None

== Honours ==
=== National honours ===
Coat of arms of Bhanurangsi Savangwongse.

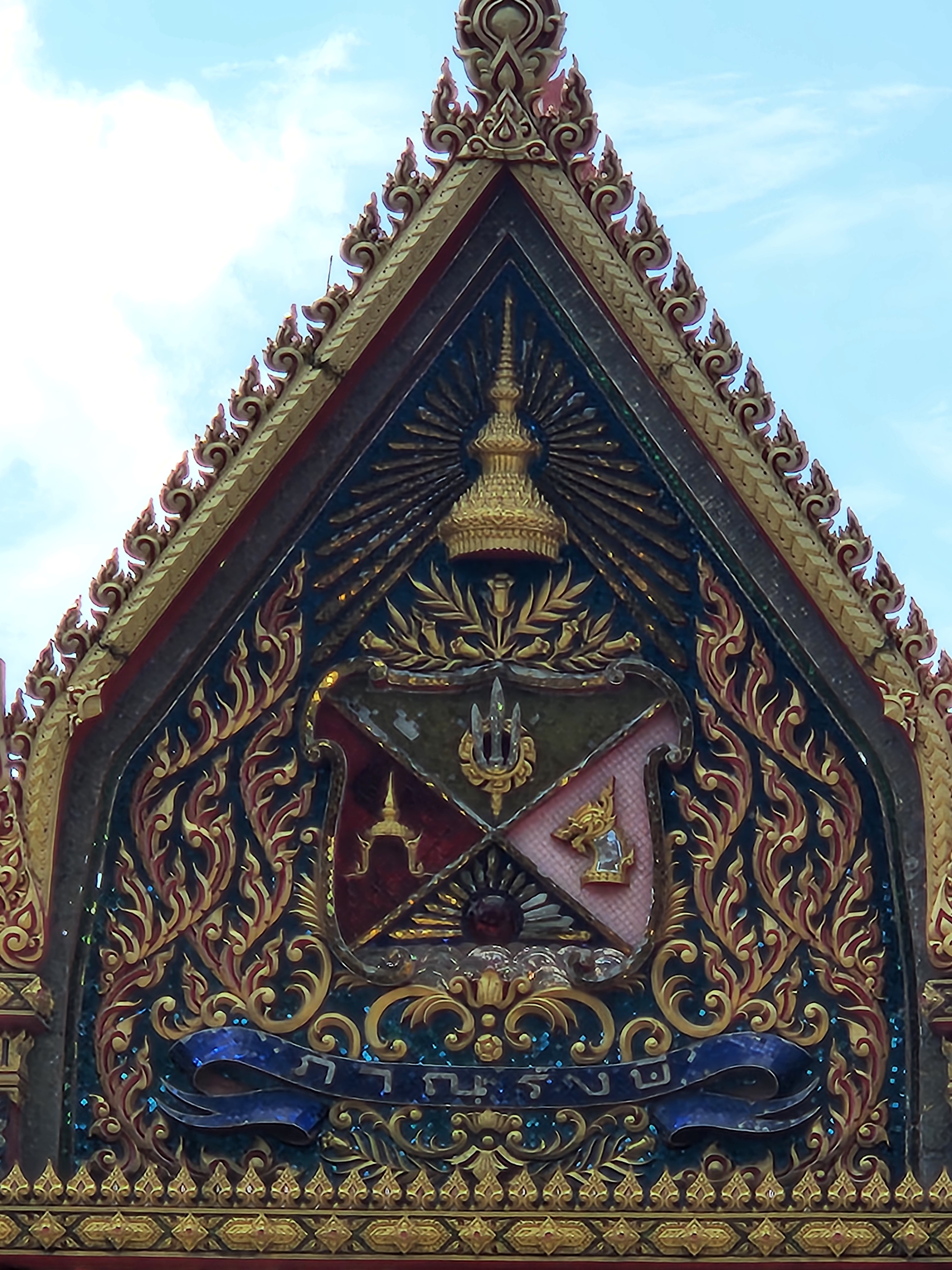
His lesser coat of arms at Wat Bhanurangsi, Bang Phlat, Bangkok.

- Knight of the Most Illustrious Order of the Royal House of Chakri (1882)
- Knight of the Ancient and Auspicious Order of the Nine Gems (1869)
- Knight Grand Cordon (Special Class) of the Most Illustrious Order of Chula Chom Klao (1900)
- Knight of the Ratana Varabhorn Order of Merit (1912)
- Knight Grand Commander (Senangapati) of the Honourable Order of Rama (1918)
- Knight Grand Cordon (Special Class) of the Most Exalted Order of the White Elephant (1913)
- Knight Grand Cordon (Special Class) of the Most Noble Order of the Crown of Thailand (1920)
- Dushdi Mala Medal (1893)
- Chakra Mala Medal (1893)
- Chakrabarti Mala Medal (1898)
- Saradul Mala Medal (1926)
- Pushpa Mala Medal (1901)
- King Rama IV Royal Cypher Medal, 2nd Class (1904)
- King Rama V Royal Cypher Medal, 1st Class (1901)
- King Rama VI Royal Cypher Medal, 1st Class (1910)
- King Rama VII Royal Cypher Medal, 1st Class (1926)
- Rachada Bhisek Medal (1893)
- Prabas Mala Medal (1898)
- Rajini Medal (1898)
- Dvidha Bhisek Medal (1903)
- Rajamangala Medal (1907)
- Rajamangala Bhisek Medal (1908)
- King Rama VI Coronation Medal (1911)
- King Rama VII Coronation Medal (1925)

=== Foreign honours ===
- Austria-Hungary:
  - Knight Grand Cross of the Order of the Iron Crown (1873)
- Brunswick:
  - Grand Cross of the Order of Henry the Lion (1909)
- France:
  - Grand Cross of the National Order of the Legion of Honour (1921)
- Hawaii:
  - Knight Grand Cross of the Royal Order of Kalākaua (1881)
- Italy:
  - Knight Grand Cross of the Order of Saints Maurice and Lazarus (1895)
  - Knight Grand Cross of the Order of the Crown of Italy (1881)
- Japan:
  - Grand Cordon with Paulownia Flowers of the Order of the Rising Sun (1890)
- Portugal:
  - Grand Cross of the Order of Christ (1878)
- Prussia:
  - Grand Cross of the Order of the Red Eagle (1896)
- Russia:
  - Knight of the Order of the White Eagle (1891)
- Spain:
  - Knight Grand Cross of the Order of Isabella the Catholic (1879)

Bhanurangsi Savangwongse, The Prince Bhanubandhu Vongsevoradej House of Bhanubandh Cadet branch of the House of Chakri Born: 11 January 1859 Died: 13 June 1928
Political offices
Preceded by Prachaksinlapakhom	Minister of Defence; 1901–1910	Succeeded by Chirapravati Voradej
Assembly seats
First	President of the Supreme Council of State; 1926–1928	Succeeded by Paribatra Sukhumbandhu
Military offices
Preceded by Surasakmontri as Chief of Army Department	Chief of Joint Operations Department; 1892–1896	Succeeded by Narisara Nuwattiwong
Preceded by Narisara Nuwattiwong	Chief of Joint Operations Department; 1899–1901	Succeeded by Chirapravati Voradej
Preceded by Chonlayutthayothin	Chief of Navy Department acting 1901–1902	Succeeded by Himself
Vacant Himself (acting) Title last held by Chonlayutthayothin	Chief of Navy Department; 1902–1903	Succeeded by Paribatra Sukhumbandhu
Preceded by Paribatra Sukhumbandhu as Minister of Navy	Director-General of the Navy; 1920–1922	Succeeded by Abhakara Kiartivongse as Minister of Navy
