= Nibha Nobhadol =

Princess Nibha Nobhadol of Siam
- Princess of Uthong
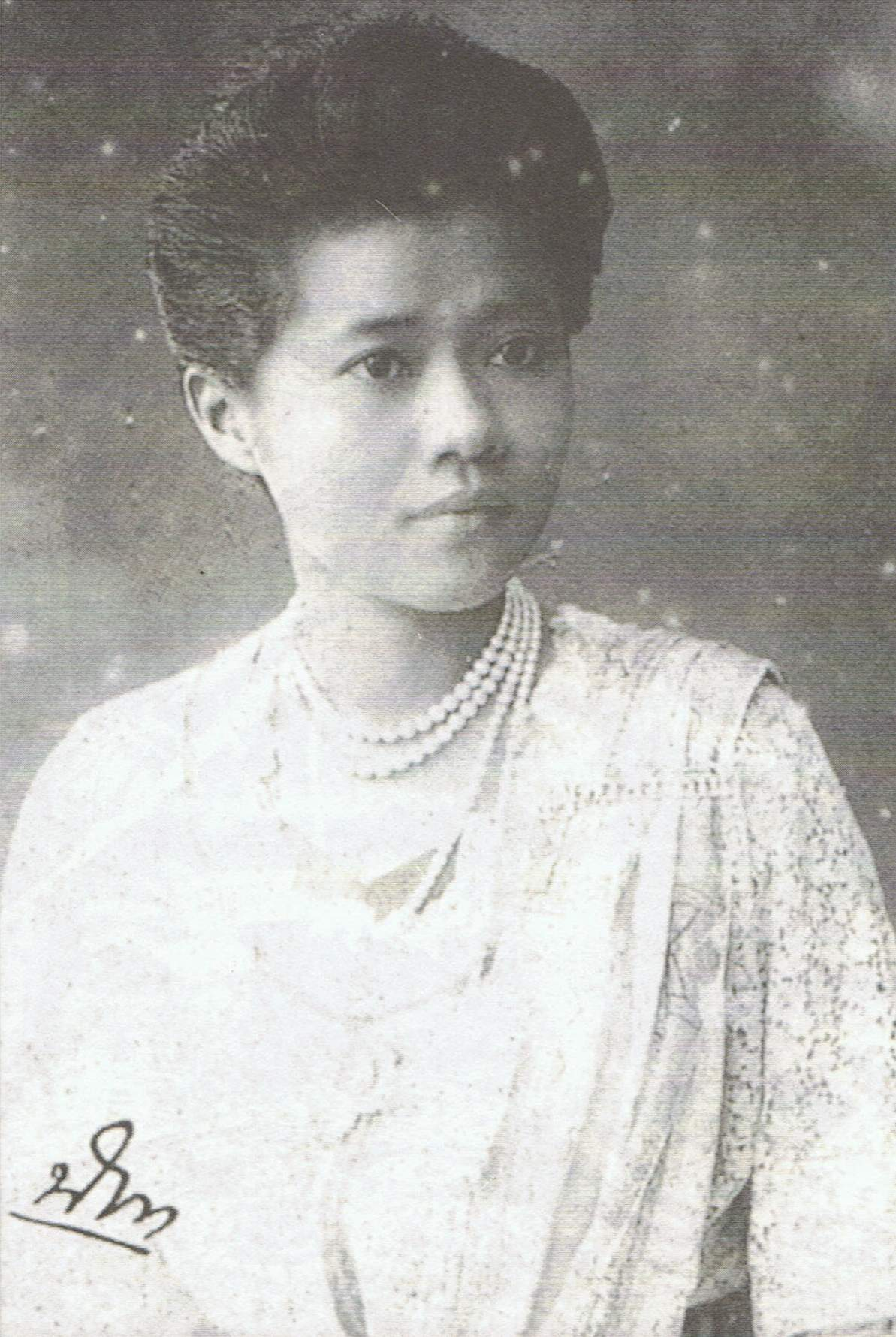
- Born: 4 December 1886; Grand Palace, Bangkok, Siam
- Died: 29 January 1935 (aged 48); Bandung, Dutch East Indies
- Dynasty: Chakri
- Father: Chulalongkorn (Rama V)
- Mother: Saisavali Bhiromya

Princess Nibha Nobhadol, Princess of Uthong, or Somdet Phra Chao Boromwongse Ther Chao Fa Nibha Nobhadol Vimolprabhavadi Krommakhun Uthongkhet Khattiyanari (RTGS: Nipha Nopphadon; Thai: สมเด็จพระเจ้าบรมวงศ์เธอ เจ้าฟ้านิภานภดล วิมลประภาวดี กรมขุนอู่ทองเขตขัตติยนารี; 4 December 1886 – 29 January 1935), was the Princess of Siam (later Thailand). She was a member of the Siamese royal family. She is a daughter of Chulalongkorn, King Rama V of Siam. She served as the personal secretary of her father, King Chulalongkorn, while he did many royal duties. He always wrote the letters while visiting Europe to her, which are all collected in her novel called Klai Baan or Far from home.

After the Siamese Revolution of 1932, she decided moving to stay with her stepbrother's family, Paribatra Sukhumbandhu, Prince of Nakhon Sawan at Bandung, West Java, Indonesia, and died on 29 January 1935.

== Birth ==
Princess Nibha Nobhadol is the third daughter and the last child of King Chulalongkorn (Rama V the Great) of Siam and Princess Saisavali Bhiromya, the Princess Suddhasininat Piyamaharaj Padivarada, daughter of Prince Ladavalya, the Prince Bhumindrabhakdi and Mom Chin Ladavalya na Ayudhya. She was born on 4 December 1886, at Grand Palace. She was called from her father as Ying Bha or Princess Bha. She was given full name by her father as Nibha Nobhadol Vimolprabhavadi (Thai: นิภานภดล วิมลประภาวดี).

She had three siblings; an elder brother, and two elder sisters:

- Prince Yugala Dighambara, Prince of Lopburi (17 March 1883 – 8 April 1932)
- Princess Nabhachara Chamrassri (5 May 1884 – 31 August 1889)
- Princess Malini Nobhadara, the Princess of Srisatchanalai (31 July 1885 – 22 December 1924)

== Royal duties ==
Princess Nibha Nobhadol was very trusted by her father. She served as her father's personal secretary, for managing his works and duties. While her father did his royal duty in visiting Europe in 1907, he always wrote letters to her while staying abroad. So after she got these royal letters, she collected and rewrote the detail about her father's journal trip to Europe in the Thai novel, Far from home or also called in Thai Klai Baan (Thai: ไกลบ้าน).

In 1911, she and her elder sister, Princess Malini Nobhadara donated their money to build the Yaovamalaya Uthis (Piyarajbobhit-Padivarada) building in Debsirin School. When she was 28 years old, she donated her own money to build the Nibha Nobhadol building in Wat Debsirin for the Buddhist school of religious study, for giving honour to her father and her grandmother, Queen Debsirindra.

On 15 November 1925, she was given the royal title from her stepbrother, King Vajiravudh (Rama VI) as Princess of Uthong, translated in Thai as Krommakhun Uthongkhet Khattiyanari (Thai: กรมขุนอู่ทองเขตขัตติยนารี). She was given the rank of Krommakhun, the 4th level of the Krom ranks.

== Adult life ==
After her father's death in 1910, she moved from the compound of Grand Palace to Suan Sunandha Royal Villa, in the compound of Dusit Palace, with her mother and her elder sister, Princess Malini Nobhadara. But after her mother and her elder sister died, she had lived alone since then. But she always visited her step-siblings and the other members of the royal family. She was close to her stepbrother and stepsister, Princess Suddha Dibyaratana, Princess of Rattanakosin, and her younger brother, Paribatra Sukhumbandhu, Prince of Nakhon Sawan with his family. She usually visited them almost every week in his residence, Bang Khunphrom Palace. She joined watching films with the Paribatra's family almost every weekends.

== Later life ==
After the Siamese Revolution of 1932, she decided moving to Indonesia, she was requested by her stepbrother, Paribatra Sukhumbandhu, to live with him and his family. So she moved to stay at Prince Paribatra's private residence in Bandung, West Java called Daha Pati House.

She lived there all her life, and died on 29 January 1935, at the age of 48. Her body was brought back to Bangkok, to perform the Royal Cremation at Sanam Luang.

== Ancestry ==
Ancestor of Princess Nibha Nobhadol, the Princess of Uthongkhet Khattiyanari
Princess Nibha Nobhadol, the Princess of Uthong	Father: Chulalongkorn, King Rama V of Siam	Paternal Grandfather: Mongkut, King Rama IV of Siam	Paternal Great-grandfather: Buddha Loetla Nabhalai, King Rama II of Siam
Princess Nibha Nobhadol, the Princess of Uthong	Father: Chulalongkorn, King Rama V of Siam	Paternal Grandfather: Mongkut, King Rama IV of Siam	Paternal Great-grandmother: Queen Sri Suriyendra
Princess Nibha Nobhadol, the Princess of Uthong	Father: Chulalongkorn, King Rama V of Siam	Paternal Grandmother: Queen Debsirindra	Paternal Great-grandfather: Prince Sirivongse, the Prince Matayabidaksa
Princess Nibha Nobhadol, the Princess of Uthong	Father: Chulalongkorn, King Rama V of Siam	Paternal Grandmother: Queen Debsirindra	Paternal Great-grandmother: Mom Noi Sirivongs na Ayudhya
Princess Nibha Nobhadol, the Princess of Uthong	Mother: Princess Saisavalibhirom, the Princess Suddhasininat Piyamaharaj Padivarada	Maternal Grandfather: Prince Ladavalya, the Prince Bhumindrabhakdi	Maternal Great-grandfather: Nangklao, King Rama III of Siam
Princess Nibha Nobhadol, the Princess of Uthong	Mother: Princess Saisavalibhirom, the Princess Suddhasininat Piyamaharaj Padivarada	Maternal Grandfather: Prince Ladavalya, the Prince Bhumindrabhakdi	Maternal Great-grandmother: Chao Chom Manda Emnoi
Princess Nibha Nobhadol, the Princess of Uthong	Mother: Princess Saisavalibhirom, the Princess Suddhasininat Piyamaharaj Padivarada	Maternal Grandmother: Mom Chin Ladavalya na Ayudhya	Maternal Great-grandfather: unknown
Princess Nibha Nobhadol, the Princess of Uthong	Mother: Princess Saisavalibhirom, the Princess Suddhasininat Piyamaharaj Padivarada	Maternal Grandmother: Mom Chin Ladavalya na Ayudhya	Maternal Great-grandmother: unknown

== Sources ==
- Giving royal name ceremony at Grand Palace, Bangkok
- Prestigious royal title of Princess Nibha Nobhadol
- Princess Nibha Nobhadol, Krommakhun Uthongkhet Khattiyanari
- Klai Baan 100th European visiting anniversary of King Chulalongkorn
- Princess Nibha Nobhadol, the Princess of Uthong - Debsirin School
