= Wisutkasat =

Wisutkasat or Wisut Kasat may refer to:

- Wisut Kasat Road in Bangkok
- Wisut Kasattri, a queen of the Ayutthaya Kingdom
