= Rangsinobhadol Yugala =

Thai environmentalist

Khun Ying Rangsinobhadol Yugala PChW
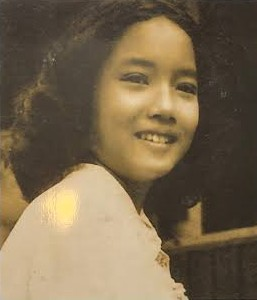
- Born: Princess Rangsinobhadol Yugala; 2 January 1938; Bangkok, Siam
- Died: 6 May 2017 (aged 79); Bangkok, Thailand
- Occupation: Environmentalist
- Spouses: M.L. Tuang Sanitwongse (divorced): Wichian Trakulsin
- Parents: Bhanubandhu Yugala (father); Soiraya Sanidvongs (mother)

Rangsinobhadol Yugala (Thai: รังษีนภดล ยุคล; born January 2, 1938 – May 6, 2017) was a Thai environmentalist. She was a member of the Thai royal family. Her royal title was Mom Chao, or M.C., the most junior title, but still considered royalty. Princess Rangsinobhadol Yugala resigned from her royal title to marry M.L. Tuang Sanitwongse, and changed to use the title Khun Ying instead.

== Early life and education ==
Khun Ying Rangsinobhadol born as Princess Rangsinobhadol Yugala to Prince Bhanubandhu Yugala and Soiraya Sanidvongs. She attended Rajini School until grade 4 and then went to study in Lausanne, Switzerland. In addition to general subjects, Princess Rangsinobhadol also studied sports and languages and was proficient in many sports such as horseback riding, tennis, and swimming.

Khun Ying Rangsinobhadol received an honorary doctorate degree in environmental science from Suan Sunandha Rajabhat University on May 7, 2011.

Khun Ying Rangsinobhadol lives at Rangsit Klong Si Palace, which is in the area close to the Bueng Yitho Palace of Princess Soamsawali and Princess Bajrakitiyabha. Rangsit Klong Si Palace is also the office of the Rangsinobhadol Yugala Foundation, a foundation that has realized the importance of the conservation of wild elephants, gaurs and other wild animals. Khun Ying Rangsinobhadol has brought her private field to be used as a plot to grow Hom Nin rice according to the Sufficiency economy by sowing rice fertilize and control the harvest by herself. She also use the fields as their workplaces to monitor the rice plots and bring Hom Nil rice products that have been distributed to people in various areas.

== Environmentalist careers ==
In his early life, Prince Rangsi Nopadol followed his father, Prince Bhanubandhu Yugala to see the nature in many forest areas. She was interested in studying plants and the well-being of each species of wildlife as well as studying wildlife footprints until she was highly skilled and was able to convey this knowledge to those who worked and were close to her as well. Khun Ying Rangsinobhadol is regarded as a natural resource conservationist.

== Marriage ==
Princess Rangsinobhadol respectfully resigned from royal status to marry Mom Luang Tuang Sanitwongse on April 10, 1956. After that, She divorced and married to Wichian Trakulsin.

== Death ==
Khun Ying Rangsinobhadol died of acute heart failure at 8:00 p.m. on July 6, 2017, at 79. On March 24, 2019, Princess Soamsawali please give her daughter, Princess Bajrakitiyabha in her place to preside over the royal funeral ceremony.
