= Anusorn Mongkolkarn =

Thai film director

Anusorn Mongkolkarn; อนุสรมงคลการ
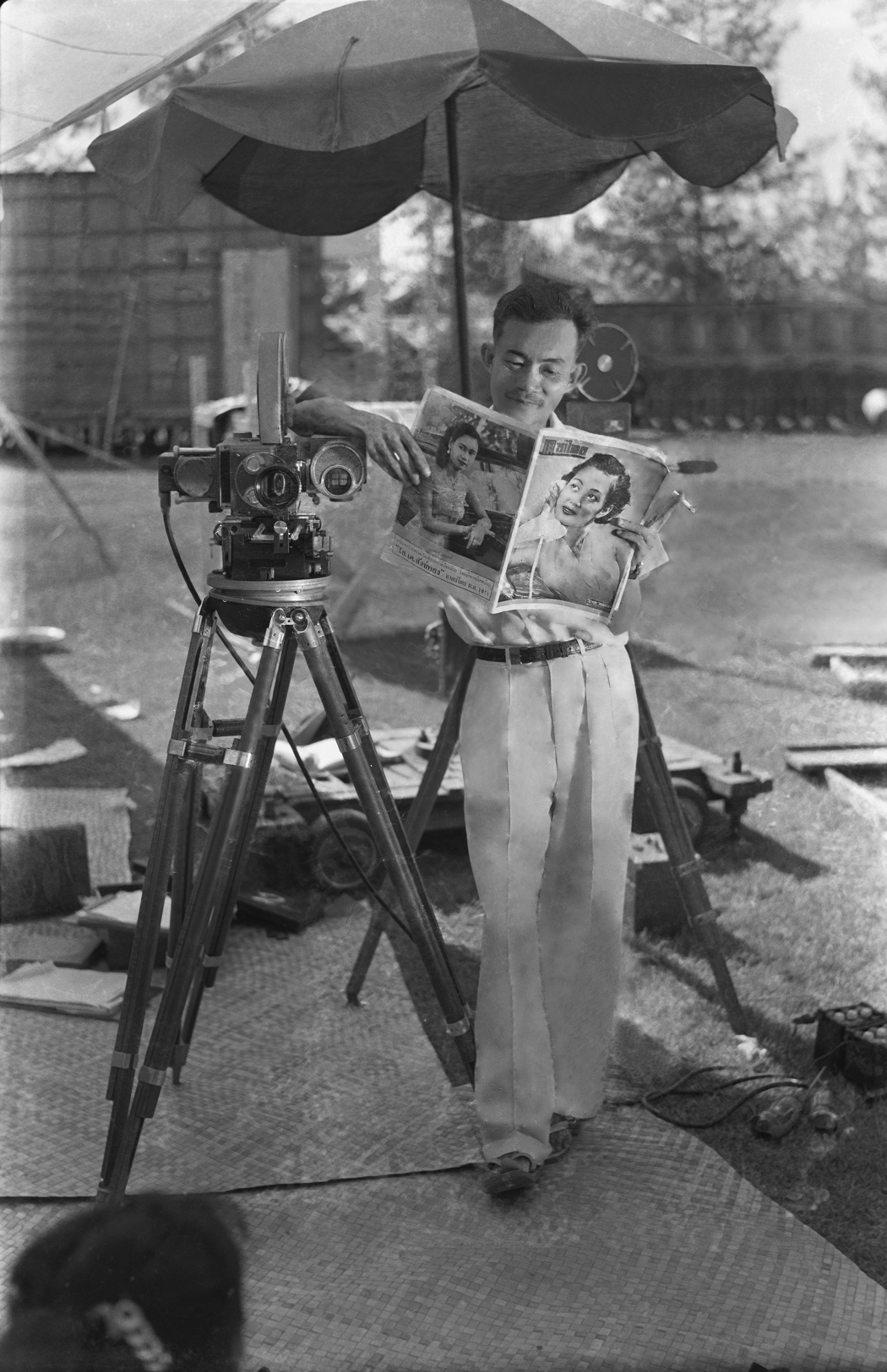
- Anusorn Mongkolkarn in 1954
- Born: 1 April 1915; Bangkok, Siam
- Died: 2 January 1998 (aged 82); Bangkok, Thailand
- Spouse: Fongjan Intakat; Ubol Surit
- Issue: Chantara Charassri Yukol; Bhumree Bhirom Yukol; Malinee Mongkol Yukol; Pattamana Rangsi Yukol; Chatrichalerm Yukol; Chulcherm Yukol; Noppadol Chalermsri Yukol
- House: Yukol (Chakri Dynasty)
- Father: Yugala Dighambara
- Mother: Chalermkhetra Mangala
- Occupation: Film director

Anusorn Mongkolkarn (Thai: พระเจ้าวรวงศ์เธอ พระองค์เจ้าอนุสรมงคลการ) (1 April 1915 – 2 January 1998) was a Thai film director and 1996 National Artist of Thailand recipient. He was a grandson of King Chulalongkorn, and also one of the indirect first-degree cousins to Kings Ananda Mahidol and Bhumibol Adulyadej as well as Princesses Galyani Vadhana and Bejaratana, since his father, Prince Yugala Dighambara was one of the paternal half-brothers of King Vajiravudh, King Prajadhipok and Prince Mahidol Adulyadej.

== Personal life ==
He was the son of Yugala Dighambara and Chalermkhetra Mangkala. Born on April 1, 1915, he has 2 older brothers namely,

- Bhanubandhu Yugala
- Chaloermphon Dighambara

== Careers ==
He was film director in 1940–1998, his first film direction as Nam Yok Aao Nam Bong. (หนามยอกเอาหนามบ่ง) and last film direction as Kruea Fa. (เครือฟ้า). His famous film direction by him include Nang Tat. (นางทาส), Nguen Nguen Nguen. (เงิน เงิน เงิน) etc.

== Death ==
He died on January 2, 1998.

== Honours ==
- Knight of the Most Illustrious Order of the Royal House of Chakri (1972)
- Knight Grand Cross (First Class) of the Most Illustrious Order of Chula Chom Klao (1996)
- Knight Grand Cordon (Special Class) of the Most Exalted Order of the White Elephant (1992)
- Knight Grand Cordon (Special Class) of the Most Noble Order of the Crown of Thailand (1996)
- Member (Special Class) of the Order of Symbolic Propitiousness Ramkeerati (1991)
- Companion (Fourth Class) of the Most Admirable Order of the Direkgunabhorn (1997)
- Chakra Mala Medal (1963)
- King Rama VI Royal Cypher Medal, 3rd Class (1924)
- King Rama VII Royal Cypher Medal, 3rd Class (1926)
- King Rama IX Royal Cypher Medal, 2nd Class (1953)
