= Chandrmondol =

Princess of Siam, daughter of King Mongkut

- Princess Wisutkrasat
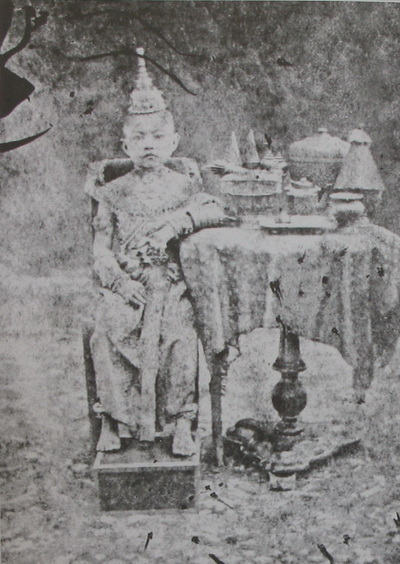
- Born: 24 April 1855; Grand Palace, Bangkok, Siam
- Died: 14 May 1863 (aged 8); Grand Palace, Bangkok, Siam
- House: Chakri dynasty
- Father: Mongkut (Rama IV)
- Mother: Debsirindra
- Religion: Buddhism

Chandrmondol Sobhon Bhagiawati, the Princess Wisutkrasat (Thai: จันทรมณฑล โสภณภควดี; Thai pronunciation: [tɕān.tʰɔːn.mōn.tʰōn sǒː.pʰōn.pʰá(ʔ).kʰá(ʔ).wá(ʔ).diː]; RTGS: Chanthonmonthon Sophonphakhawadi; 24 April 1855 — 14 May 1863) also known as Princess Fa-ying or Somdetch Chow Fa-ying (Thai: สมเด็จเจ้าฟ้าหญิง; RTGS: Somdet Chao Fa-ying "Royal highness Princess") was a Princess of Siam and daughter of King Mongkut and Queen Debsirindra.

== Biography ==
Princess Chandrmondol was born at the Grand Palace in Bangkok, on 24 April 1855, the only daughter of King Mongkut and Queen Debsirindra. Chandrmondol had an elder brother, Prince Chulalongkorn and younger brother, Prince Chaturonrasmi and Prince Bhanurangsi Savangwongse.

She was initially named Chandrmondol, and changed to Chandrmondol Sobhon Bhagiawati in 1862 by order of King Mongkut. her father called her "Nang Nu" (Thai: นางหนู; "the little daughter"), and Palace officials affectionately called her "Fa-ying".

Princess Chandrmondol was tutored in the English language and Western manners by Anna Leonowens.

She died of cholera on May 14, 1863, and was buried in Sanam Luang in Bangkok. When Chulalongkorn was crowned in 1867, she was posthumously given the title the Princess Wisutkrasat (Thai: วิสุทธิกระษัตริย์ "the Lady of Purity") on 3 May 1884.

== Legacy ==
She was a "Princess Fâ-ying" a character in Anna and the King. Wisut Kasat Road was another name for Princess Chandrmondol.
