= Dibyasambandh =

Dibyasambanna
- Princess of Siam
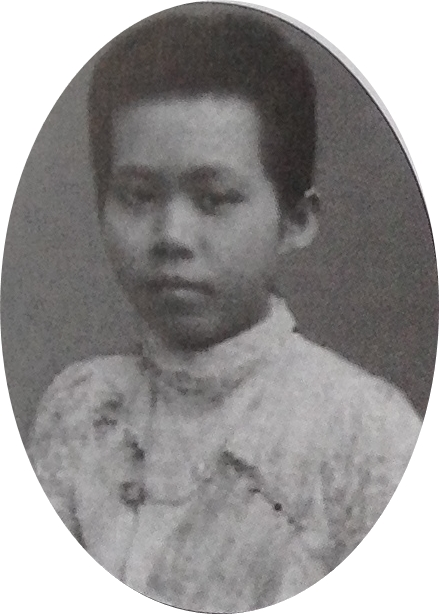
- Born: 17 May 1885; Bangkok, Siam
- Died: 26 July 1908 (aged 23); Bangkok, Siam
- Spouse: Abhakara Kiartivongse, Prince of Chumphon
- Issue: Prince Aditya Dibabha; Prince Rangsiyakorn Abhakara
- House: Bhanubandh family (Chakri Dynasty)
- Father: Bhanurangsi Savangwongse
- Mother: Mom Liam

Princess Dibyasambanna (Thai: พระวรวงศ์เธอ พระองค์เจ้าทิพยสัมพันธ์; RTGS: Phra Worawong Thoe Phra Ong Chao Thipphayasamphan; Née Her Serene Highness Princess (Mom Chao) Dibyasambanna Bhanubandh Thai: ทิพยสัมพันธ์ ภาณุพันธ์; RTGS: Thipphayasamphan Phanuphan; 17 May 1885 - 26 July 1908) was a Princess of Siam (later Thailand). She was a member of Siamese royal family, specifically the Bhanubandh family, as a daughter of Prince Bhanurangsi Savangwongse and Mom Liam.

== Biography ==
Princess Dibyasambanna is the eldest child of Prince Bhanurangsi Savangwongse and Mom Liam, the princess born at Buraphaphirom Palace On 7 July 1885. As for the name, Dibyasambanna Bhanubandh was bestowed by King Chulalongkorn. As well as being close to King Chulalongkorn since childhood, Princess Dibyasambanna was married to Abhakara Kiartivongse, Prince of Chumphon on February 28, 1900. They had three sons: Prince Kiat Abhakara (Born and died on the same day), Prince Aditya Dibabha and Prince Rangsiyakorn Abhakara.

While Prince Rangsiyakorn Abhakara, the youngest son, had only 1 year old, an unexpected incident occurred when Princess Dibyasambanna died of poison on July 26, 1908. The royal fire ceremony began on 2 February 1908, which has dug a burial ground to be sent to cremate the cremation at the crematorium of Wat Debsirindrawas Ratchaworawiharn. The cremation ceremony was held on 3 February, with King Chulalongkorn become the president of the ceremony.
