= Chulcherm Yukol =

Thai military officer and royal (1947–2025)

Chulcherm Yukol จุลเจิม ยุคล
- Born: 22 January 1947; Bangkok, Thailand
- Died: 27 November 2025 (aged 78); Chiang Mai, Thailand
- Spouse: Siriphorn Yukol Na Ayuddhaya; Auncharee Yukol Na Ayuddhaya
- Issue: 4
- House: Yukol (Chakri dynasty)
- Father: Anusorn Mongkolkarn
- Mother: Ubol Surit

Major General Prince Chulcherm Yukol (Thai: หม่อมเจ้าจุลเจิม ยุคล; 22 January 1947 – 27 November 2025) was a Thai military officer and a member of the Thai royal family.

== Life and career ==
Prince Chulcherm Yukol was born on 22 January 1947, to Prince Anusorn Mongkolkarn and Ubol Surit. He graduated from Kemper Military School, Missouri, and completed a bachelor's degree in electrical engineering from Western Pacific University (now California Miramar University) and a master's degree in sports management.

During his time in the Royal Thai Armed Forces, he achieved the rank of Major General. In 2008, he was awarded the Order of the Crown of Thailand.

Yukol died on 27 November 2025, at the age of 78.
