= Wisut Kasat Road =

Street in Bangkok, Thailand

Coordinates: 13.76395°N 100.503841°E

Wisut Kasat Road (Thai: ถนนวิสุทธิกษัตริย์, pronounced [tʰa.nǒn wí.sùt kà.sàt.trìʔ]) is a short street in the northern part of Bangkok's Phra Nakhon District off Rattanakosin Island.

== History and route ==
The road branches off from Ratchadamnoen Avenue at the Jor Por Ror Intersection to the northwest, crosses Prachathipatai Road at the Wisut Kasat Intersection, and continues straight through Samsen Road at the Bang Khun Phrom Intersection, where the Bank of Thailand is located, up till it dead-ends on the Chao Phraya River, total distance 1.449 km (0.9 mi). Almost the entire length is under the Rama VIII Bridge ramp.

It was constructed from King Rama V private fund in memory of his younger sister, Princess Chandrmondol, a daughter of King Rama IV and Queen Debsirindra. The princess died at the age of nine.

In having the road had built, the king decided that government funds were to be spent of the construction and maintenance and that the owners of the land along the road would benefit from an increase in the price of the land; the king therefore requested contributions towards the road construction from those who would benefit from it. This prompted the issuing of the road construction in the city of Bangkok act in 1904. Later, during the King Rama VII's reign, Wisut Kasat Road was extended from the Chao Phraya River to Samsen Road, passing through Bang Khun Phrom area.

The area that the road runs through is known among Thai people as Wisut Kasat neighborhood. It is well known locally as the place where the grand Songkran festival was held every year for at least 80 years. The highlight of the event that is well known is the beauty contest called "Miss Wisut Kasat". Up until now, many celebrities have participated in the contest such as Khunying Pankruea Yongchaiyudh, Jariya Anfone, Sueangsuda Lawanprasert etc.
