= Chalermkhetra Mangala =

- Princess of Thailand
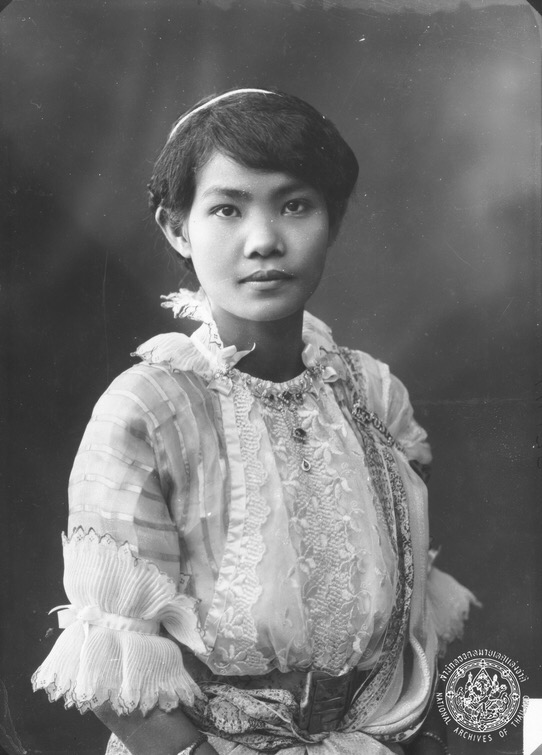
- Born: March 10, 1892
- Died: January 23, 1957 (aged 64)
- Burial: 26 June 1957; Bangkok, Thailand
- Spouse: Yugala Dighambara, Prince of Lopburi
- Issue: Prince Bhanubandhu Yugala; Prince Chalermbol Dighambara; Prince Anusorn Mongkolkarn
- House: Bhanubandhu (by birth); Yugala (by marriage)
- Dynasty: Chakri
- Father: Prince Bhanurangsi Savangwongse, the Prince Bhanubandhuwongse Voradej
- Mother: Mom Maen Bhanubandhu na Ayudhya

Princess Chalermkhetra Mangala (Thai: พระเจ้าวรวงศ์เธอ พระองค์เจ้าเฉลิมเขตรมงคล; 10 March 1892 – 23 January 1957) was a Princess of Thailand. She was the daughter of Prince Bhanurangsi Savangwongse, Prince Bhanubandhuwongse Voradej and Mom (Lady) Maen Bhanubandhu na Ayudhya. She was the consort of Prince Yugala Dighambara, Prince of Lopburi.

== Biography ==
Princess Chalermkhetra Mangala (formerly Mom Chao Chalermkhetra Mangala) was born on 10 March 1892. She was the daughter of Prince Bhanurangsi Savangwongse and Mom Maen Bhanubandhu na Ayudhya (née Bunnak). She had two elder full brothers:

- Prince Phanupongse Phiriyadej
- Prince Sirivongse Wattanadej

The Princess shared a very close bond with her father. Having lost her mother when she was only two years old, her father raised her closely. Out of deep affection for his daughter, her father granted her every wish within his capabilities. During her childhood, her nanny was Prince Khamrob, a close military aide to her father, whom she affectionately addressed as "Mae" (Mother).

In the year of her birth, King Chulalongkorn (Rama V) celebrated the 25th anniversary of his reign. Consequently, several senior royals requested auspicious names from the King for three royal children born around that time:

- Mom Chao Chalermkhetra Mangala
- Mom Chao Ratchalaph Chirathit (son of Prince Damrong Rajanubhab)
- Mom Chao Ratchadapisek (son of Prince Phitthayalaph Phrutthithada)

On 26 November 1893, King Chulalongkorn elevated her status to Phra Vorawongse Thoe Phra Ong Chao (Princess of a higher tier). Later, on 12 April 1900, she was further elevated to Phra Chao Vorawongse Thoe Phra Ong Chao alongside her two full brothers.

== Marriage ==
Princess Chalermkhetra Mangala first met Prince Yugala Dighambara, the Prince of Lopburi, during a temple fair shop exhibition at Wat Benchamabophit. As Prince Santhasaphasit later related to Poon Pismai Diskul:

"...At the Wat Benchamabophit fair, the young princes wanted to look at the young ladies but did not dare to. I had to arrange it for them. I sat with the young men in front of the shop and called the young ladies over to receive gifts. Some acted affectedly and shyly because of the young men. But when it was Yai Bie [Princess Chalermkhetra Mangala], she just walked over naturally, prostrated to receive the money, and even prostrated to those young princes as well. Prince Yugala was thus very pleased with her lack of affectation..."

Her genuine, down-to-earth nature and completely natural demeanor attracted Prince Yugala, who was otherwise surrounded by women acting with rigid court affectations. Due to their compatible temperaments, their romance progressed smoothly. When Princess Chalermkhetra Mangala was 16 years old, King Chulalongkorn granted royal permission for her marriage to Prince Yugala Dighambara. She was highly honored by Rama V as a principal royal daughter-in-law (Saphi Luang). Prince Bhanurangsi Savangwongse described the wedding:

"...His Majesty graciously commanded Chao Khun Chom Manda Phae [Chao Khun Phra Prayurawongse] to escort his daughter, Princess Chalermkhetra Mangala, to be presented to His Royal Highness Prince Yugala Dighambara, the Prince of Lopburi, as his principal royal consort, following the modern customs, on 22 November 1907..."

The royal couple practiced monogamy throughout their marriage, and had three sons:

1. Prince Bhanubandhu Yugala (27 November 1910 – 5 February 1995); married Mom Luang Soiraya (née Sanidvongs), Mom Bunlom, Mom Prim, and Mom Chailai. He had six children.
2. Prince Chalermpol Dighambara (29 April 1913 – 1 October 1991); married Mom Rajawongse Kulpramot, Mom Somchuea, Mom Thongphai, Mom Thongtham, and Mom Buathong. He had six children.
3. Prince Anusorn Mongkolkarn (1 April 1915 – 2 January 1998); married Mom Fongchan (née Princess Fongchan Inthakhat of Chiang Mai) and Mom Ubon. He had seven children.

== Personality and court life ==
The Princess referred to herself as "Mae Nu Chalermkhetra". However, senior royals affectionately called her "Yai Bie" due to her slightly flat nose. Her cousins, the other grandchildren of King Rama V, called her "Yip Yee" because she liked to squint her eyes playfully.

She was not particularly skilled in domestic chores or housework, but she never failed in her duties as a loving daughter. Regarding her lack of domestic skills, she once famously remarked: "I was born the daughter of a Chao Phra Ong (high prince) and married to become the wife of a Chao Phra Ong. How should I know how to scrub staircases or clear out drainpipes?"

Poon Pismai Diskul wrote of her character and daily life: "Princess Chalermkhetra Mangala strongly resembled her father, both in facial appearance and personality. She was widely loved and had no enemies because she never meant harm to anyone. She did not play favorites, never gossiped or criticized others, and never looked down on anyone. She possessed complete integrity and simply followed her own heart—much like a child who had been spoiled since birth because no one ever opposed her. If she had flaws, they were only matters that affected herself, such as spending lavishly, but it was her own money and she never borrowed from others to their detriment."

== Artistic interests ==
The Princess was deeply passionate about the arts, drama, and performance. She initiated the training of her court attendants to form a royal performing arts troupe that staged internal palace productions. When accompanying her husband to his administrative post in the southern provinces, she organized a court musical ensemble where her ladies-in-world served as musicians, while she herself played the saw duang (a traditional two-stringed bowed instrument).

Following her husband's death, she moved to the Mangkhalasathan Palace on Sukhumvit Road (which today serves as the Embassy of the Philippines). Throughout her later life, she continued to patronize Thai classical dance and music. She staged her first major palace production—a Khon masked dance performance—to celebrate her birthday in 1982. Later, she founded the "Chu Nat Duriyangkhasilp" troupe to perform regularly within the palace grounds, creatively using the palace's actual architecture as backdrops.

Her troupe performed on major public occasions, such as the grand opening celebration of the Chulalongkorn University Auditorium. In addition to traditional classical Thai plays, she innovated new costume designs and stage scenery, and pioneered a new theatrical genre called Lakhon Phut Salap Ram (spoken drama alternating with classical dance). Her productions drew large audiences from all social strata. She was also a talented playwright, penning popular classical dance-dramas and historical plays such as Panyi Misa-rang and an adaptation of the novel Rung Fa Doi Sing.

The Chu Nat Duriyangkhasilp troupe performed for 15 years, staging Khon masked dances, classical plays, mixed dances, and variety performances. The cast featured both nobles and commoners; many performers began their professional careers there and went on to become renowned figures in Thai performing arts. Following her death in 1957, the troupe disbanded, and her contributions to Thai theatrical arts gradually faded from public memory.

== Death ==
In her final years, Princess Chalermkhetra Mangala suffered from poor health and was unable to attend official royal ceremonies. She passed away from kidney failure on 23 January 1957 at Mangkhalasathan Palace, at the age of 64.

King Bhumibol Adulyadej (Rama IX) personally attended her royal cremation ceremony at the Royal Crematorium of Wat Debsirindrawas on the afternoon of Wednesday, 26 June 1957. On the preceding afternoon, the King visited Mangkhalasathan Palace to lay a royal wreath before her urn and preside over the Buddhist merit-making rituals.

Later, her name was honored as the name of the historic Chalermkhetra Cinema in Bangkok.
