= Saisavali Bhiromya =

- Princess Suddhasininat Piyamaharaj Padivaradda
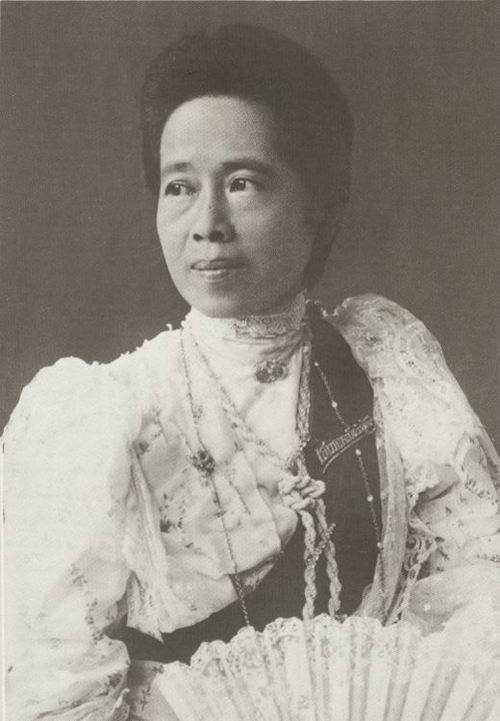
- Formal portrait from the 1880s

Princess consort of Siam
- Tenure: 1881 – 23 October 1910
- Born: Princess Sai Ladavalya; 4 September 1862; Bangkok, Siam
- Died: 24 June 1929 (aged 66); Bangkok, Siam
- Spouse: Chulalongkorn (Rama V)
- Issue: Yugala Dighambara, Prince of Lopburi; Nabhachara Chamrassri; Malini Nobhadara, Princess of Sisatchanalai; Nibha Nobhadol, Princess of Uthong
- House: Chakri Dynasty
- Father: Ladavalya, Prince of Bhumindra Bhakdi
- Mother: Chin

Saisavali Bhiromya, the Princess Suddhasininat Piyamaharaj Padivaradda (Thai: สายสวลีภิรมย์; RTGS: Saisawali Phirom), born Princess Sai Ladavalya (Thai: สาย ลดาวัลย์; RTGS: Sai Ladawan; 4 September 1862 – 24 June 1929) was a consort of Chulalongkorn, the King of Siam, who was also a second cousin.

== Early life ==
She was a daughter of Ladavalya, Prince Bhumindra Bhakdi and Lady Chin. Her sisters, Ubolratana Narinaga and Saovabhark Nariratana, also became wives of Chulalongkorn

Princess Saisavali Bhiromya died on 24 June 1929 at the age 66.

== Legacy ==
As Princess Saisavali Bhiromya was the head of the palace kitchen in the late 19th century, her recipes endured through the written works of Mom Luang Nueang Nilrat. This includes a recipe for satay, taught to the Princess by a Javanese teacher and later adapted to suit the Siamese palate. The satay became popular, and was named satay lue (Thai: สะเต๊ะลือ; RTGS: sate lue) "satay [that people] talk about".
