= Abhakara Kiartivongse =

Thai prince and admiral (1880–1923)

Abhakara Kiativong อาภากรเกียรติวงศ์
- Prince of Chumphon
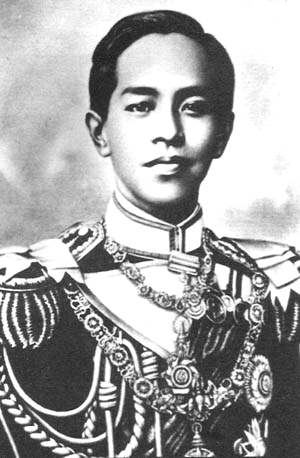

Minister of the Royal Siamese Navy
- In office: 1 April 1923 – 19 May 1923
- Acting: 1 October 1922 – 31 March 1923
- Monarch: Vajiravudh (Rama VI)
- Predecessor: Bhanurangsi Savangwongse (as Director-General)
- Successor: Asdang Dejavudh (as Director-General)
- Born: 19 December 1880; Bangkok, Siam
- Died: 19 May 1923 (aged 42); Chumphon, Siam
- Spouse: Dibyasambandh and 5 other concubines
- Issue: 11, including Aditya Dibabha
- House: Abhakara (Chakri dynasty)
- Father: Chulalongkorn (Rama V)
- Mother: Mod Bunnag
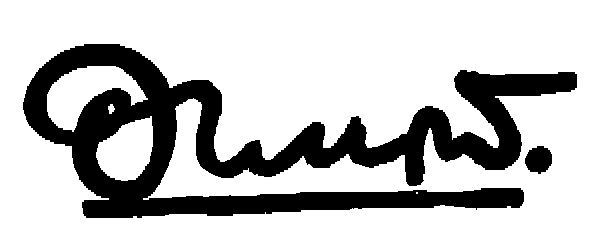
- Signature

Admiral Prince Abhakara Kiartivongse, Prince of Chumphon (19 December 1880 – 19 May 1923) (Thai: พระองค์เจ้าอาภากรเกียรติวงศ์, RTGS: Phra Ong Chao Aphakon Kiantiwong, full title: Thai: พระเจ้าบรมวงศ์เธอ พระองค์เจ้าอาภากรเกียรติวงศ์ กรมหลวงชุมพรเขตอุดมศักดิ์), was the 28th child of King Chulalongkorn (Rama V). He was commonly revered as "The Father of the Thai Navy".

As the founder of the Thai Navy (then known as the 'Royal Siamese Navy'), Abhakara was highly praised by many Thais as "Sadej Tia" (Thai: เสด็จเตี่ย; lit. Lord Father), "Mor Phon" (Thai: หมอพร; lit. Doctor Phon). The Thai Royal Navy officially granted him the title of "the Father of the Thai Navy" in 1993.

There are 217 shrines and memorials built to honour him around Thailand. The most famous of these is the Prince of Chumphon Shrine at Hat Sai Ree in Chumphon Province, where he recuperated and rehabilitated from his illnesses, before his death on 19 May 1923.

== Career ==
Prince Abhakara Kiartivongse was born on 19 December 1880. His mother, chao chom manda Mot (Mot Bunnag), was a royal concubine from an aristocratic but non-royal family, which meant that Abhakara was unlikely to ascend to the throne.

In late 1893, his father, Rama V, sent Abhakara and his brother Vajiravudh to study military science in Britain. The king's decision was motivated by the recent loss of Siam's Laotian territories to France, and his consequent desire to modernise Siam's army and navy. He hoped that his sons would acquire western military knowledge that would allow them to train future officers of the armed forces. From January 1884, the two princes studied in Ascot under the tutelage of Sir Basil Thomson . In 1895, Vajiravudh began training at the Royal Military Academy Sandhurst, while Abhakara moved to The Limes, a naval preparatory school for Royal Naval College, Greenwich, before commencing sea training in April 1897 aboard the Siamese vessel Maha Chakri. He was accepted as a midshipman (officer cadet) in the Royal Navy and posted to the battleship HMS Revenge in November 1897, and subsequently served in HMS Ramillies, the sloop HMS Cruiser and the reconnaissance vessel HMS Hawk.

Abhakara achieved good marks in his training and impressed his supervisors with his skills, but was not allowed to undertake courses in naval tactics, gunnery or torpedoes, which were deemed to be of a 'confidential character' by the Admiralty.

Since the late 20th century, some royal biographers have claimed that Abhakara saw active service in Crete during the three months of the Theriso revolt, but the chronology of this episode is difficult to corroborate with the prince's known postings and movements during his time in Britain, and the story has been described as one that 'may fit more easily into the category of legend than into that of fact.'

Abhakara returned to Siam in 1900 to serve in the creation of Royal Siamese Navy. He was made Director of the Naval Education Department, and subsequently named Deputy Commander-in-Chief of the Royal Siamese Navy in 1903–10, in which role he contributed significantly to the modernisation of the force. He was removed from public duties between 1911 and 1917, possibly as a result of rumors about his implication in plots against his half-brother, now king Vajiravudh. During this period, he studied saiyasat and saiwet, traditional Thai forms of healing and protective magic, as well as folk healing and herbal medicine.

Rehabilitated in 1917, he was made Inspector-General of the Royal Siamese Navy, followed by the office of Chief of the General Staff of the Royal Siamese Navy in 1918, Acting Minister of Marine in 1922, and Minister of Marine in 1923. In 1920, he returned to England to negotiate the purchase of the destroyer HMS Radiant, which was transferred to the Royal Siamese Navy in September as Phra Ruang. He commanded the ship during its subsequent voyage home.

In 1922 he saw that Sattahip Bay was a strategic place for the establishment of a naval base and offered royal land in Sattahip in order to build the present-day naval facilities. In honor of his contributions, the prince was proclaimed "The father of the Royal Thai Navy".

Abhakara was also a practitioner of muay Thai. During King Vajiravudh's reign, he trained many muay Thai boxers, many of whom went on to become trainers themselves.

=== Death ===
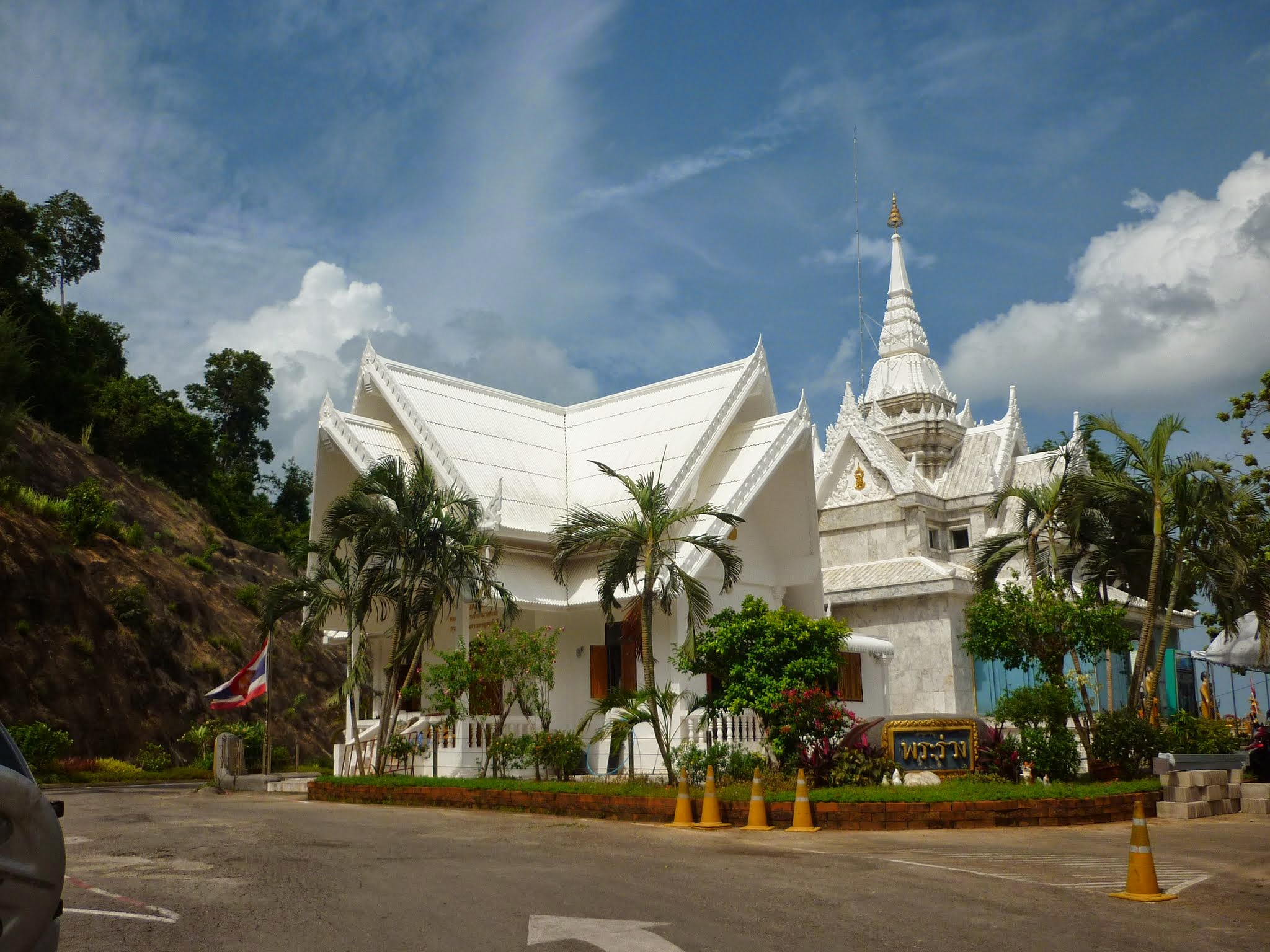
Prince of Chumphon Shrine at Hat Ree beach in Chumphon province, built to commemorate him

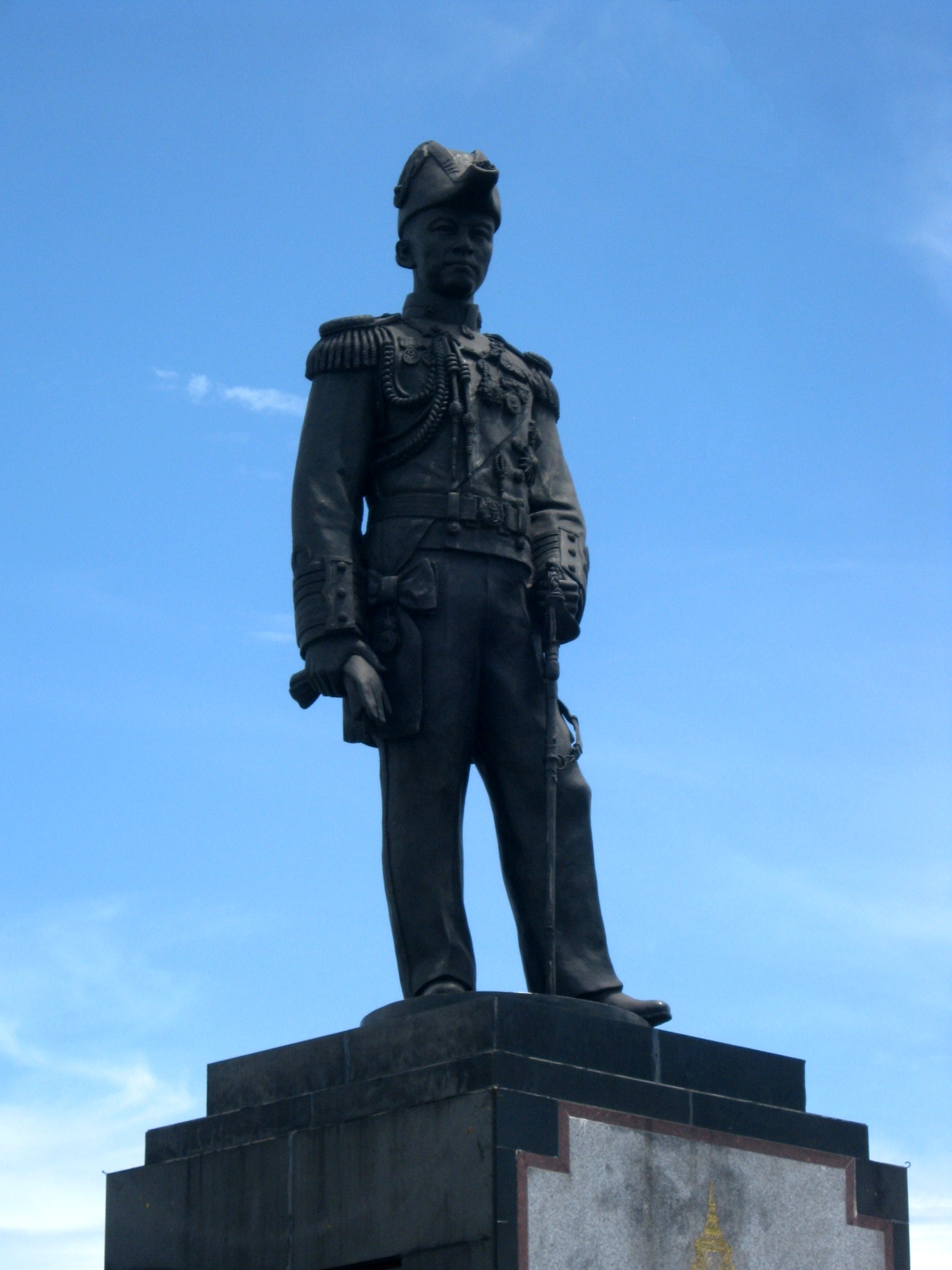
Abhakara Kiartivongse monument in Pattaya

Not long after being honoured to the title "Commander in Chief, Admiral and Father" of the Siamese Navy, Abhakara resigned from office on the grounds of ill health. He travelled for rehabilitation to Monthon Surat for a month, and then to Hat Ree beach in Chumphon province. He contracted influenza after an accidental exposure to cold rain, which worsened his condition sharply, and he died at the age of 42, on 19 May 1923, at 11:40 am.

The Royal Thai Navy marks 19 May annually as the "Abhakara Memorial Day".

== Honours ==
=== National honours ===
- Knight of the Most Illustrious Order of the Royal House of Chakri (1900)
- Knight of the Ancient and Auspicious Order of the Nine Gems (1920)
- Knight Grand Cordon (Special Class) of the Most Illustrious Order of Chula Chom Klao (1900)
- Knight of the Ratana Varabhorn Order of Merit (1921)
- Knight Grand Cross (First Class) of the Most Exalted Order of the White Elephant (1918)
- Knight Grand Cross (First Class) of the Most Noble Order of the Crown of Thailand (1904)
- Knight Commander (Second Class) of the Honourable Order of Rama (1918)
- Dushdi Mala Medal for Arts (1900)
- Chakra Mala Medal (1922)
- Pushpa Mala Medal (1909)
- King Rama V Royal Cypher Medal, 2nd Class (1901)
- King Rama VI Royal Cypher Medal, 1st Class (1921)

=== Foreign honours ===
- Denmark:
  - Grand Cross of the Order of the Dannebrog (1922)
- Italy:
  - Knight Grand Cross of the Order of Saints Maurice and Lazarus (1907)
- Japan:
  - Grand Cordon of the Order of the Rising Sun (1903)

=== Arms ===
Coat of arms of Prince Abhakara Kiartivongse, Prince of Chumphon
Coronet The Phra kiao (coronet) with a rays of light on top of pillow. Escutcheon Tierced per pall reversed. Or dexter chief with a Chakram and Trishula (trident). Rose sinister chief with a Phra kiao (coronet) with halo on top of pillow. Gules base with Surya rode in a rajasiha-drawn chariot. Symbolism A Chakram and Trishula on a yellow field represents the Prince is a member of Chakri dynasty. Phra kiao (coronet) with halo on top of pillow on a pink field represents the Prince is a son of King Chulalongkorn who was born on Tuesday. The god Surya rode in a rajasiha-drawn chariot represents his name and maternal house Bunnag family (based on the seal of Solar Sphere used by Somdet Chaophraya Borom Maha Sri Suriwongse.) Gules base mean the Prince was born on Sunday. Other versions

== Bibliography ==
- Dunn, Steve (2022). The Harwich Striking Force: The Royal Navy's Front Line in the North Sea 1914–1918. Barnsley: Pen and Sword Books.
- Ruth, Richard A. (2019). "Prince Abhakara's Experiences with Britain's Royal Navy". Sojourn: Journal of Social Issues in Southeast Asia. 34 (1): 1–47. doi:10.1355/sj34-1a. S2CID 198615786.
