= Aditya Dibabha =

Thai royal family member and politician

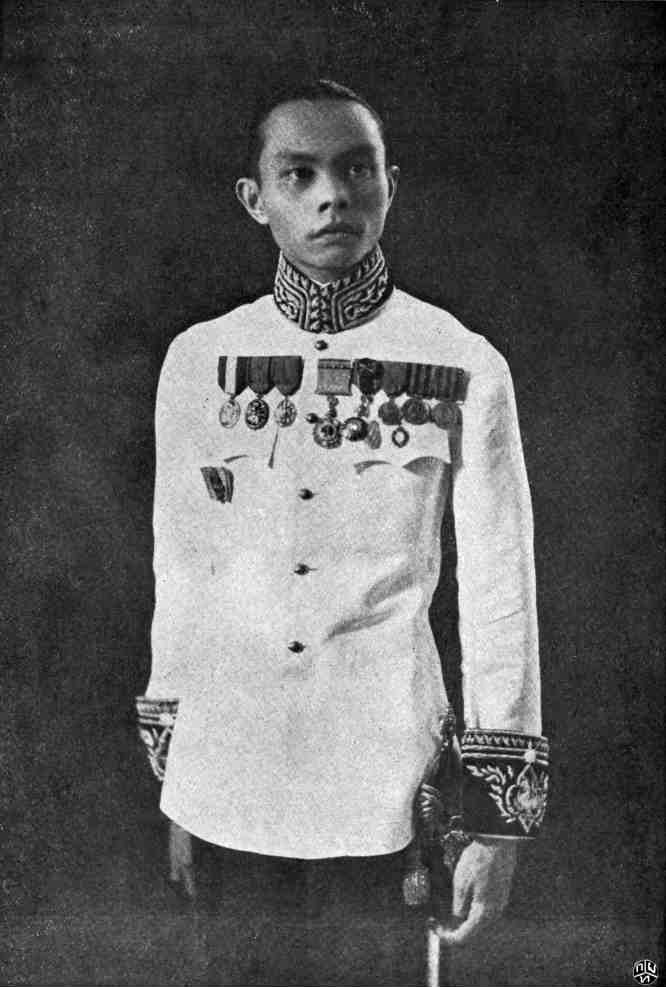
- Born: 27 July 1900; Bangkok, Siam
- Died: 19 May 1946 (aged 45); Bangkok, Siam
- Spouse: Kobkaew Wisetkul
- House: Abhakara (Chakri dynasty)
- Father: Abhakara Kiartivongse
- Mother: Dibyasambandh
- Religion: Theravada Buddhism

Prince Aditya Dibabha (Thai: อาทิตย์ทิพอาภา; RTGS: Athit Thip Apha; IPA: [ʔaː.tʰít.tʰíp.ʔaː.pʰaː]; 27 July 1900 – 19 May 1946) was a member of the Thai Royal Family and a Siamese political figure. He served as Chairman of the Regency Council between 1935 and 1944, as King Ananda Mahidol was still a minor.

== Biography ==
Aditya Dibabha was a son of Prince Abhakara Kiartivongse and Princess Dibyasambandh. He was born on 27 July 1900 with the first name born Mom Chao Aditya Dibabha. He was married to Kobkaew Wisetkul, the maid of honour of Queen Rambai Barni on 5 January 1929 they did not have a successor. He died of cancer on 19 May 1946, aged 45.

== Siamese Revolution ==
Although being a royal, Aditya was a supporter of the 1932 Siamese Revolution. He had taught the French Revolution as a teacher. Around the time of the Revolution, he translated the writings of early Age of Enlightenment philosopher Jean-Jacques Rousseau into Thai. In 1934, the translated work was published in The Era of the French Revolution, a student textbook written for students of the Faculty of Arts at Chulalongkorn University. The textbook includes notes by John Holland-Rose and Étienne Dumont. Although Aditya praises Rousseau in the book, he is critical at points such as Rousseau's idea of the political ideal society should strive for. The textbook attempts to parallel the Siamese Revolution with the French, but also acts as a warning for Siam to not repeat the mistakes made by the French during their revolution.

Despite his praise for Rousseau, Aditya preferred a British-styled constitutional monarchy over a French-styled republic.

== Military rank ==
- 1943 Lieutenant General, Vice Admiral and Air Marshal

== Honours ==
=== National honours ===
- Knight of the Most Illustrious Order of the Royal House of Chakri (1935)
- Knight of the Ancient and Auspicious Order of the Nine Gems (1941)
- Knight of the Ratana Varabhorn Order of Merit (1942)
- Knight Grand Cross of the Most Illustrious Order of Chula Chom Klao (1938)
- Knight Grand Cordon (Special Class) of the Most Exalted Order of the White Elephant (1939)
- Knight Grand Cordon (Special Class) of the Most Noble Order of the Crown of Thailand (1941)
- Safeguarding the Constitution Medal (1935)
- Medal for Service Rendered in the Interior - Franco-Thai War (1941)
- King Rama V Royal Cypher Medal, 3rd Class (1908)
- King Rama VI Royal Cypher Medal, 3rd Class (1914)
- King Rama VII Royal Cypher Medal, 3rd Class (1927)
- King Rama VIII Royal Cypher Medal, 1st Class (1938)

=== Foreign honours ===
- France:
  - Grand Cross of the National Order of the Legion of Honour (1938)
- Germany:
  - Grand Cross of the Order of the German Eagle with Star (1942)
- Italy:
  - Knight Grand Cross of the Order of Saints Maurice and Lazarus (1938)
- Japan:
  - Grand Cordon of the Supreme Order of the Chrysanthemum (1939)
- United Kingdom:
  - Honorary Knight Grand Cross of the Royal Victorian Chain (1938)

=== Arms ===
Coat of arms of Prince Aditya Dibabha
Coronet The Gold Chada Phok (coronet) Escutcheon Per fess, the chief per pale. Rose dexter chief with a Phra kiao (coronet) with halo on top of pillow. Gules sinister chief with Surya rode in a rajasiha-drawn chariot. Azure base with Chakram, anchor, and wings. Symbolism Phra kiao (coronet) with a rays of light on top of pillow on a pink field represents the Prince is a grandson of King Chulalongkorn. Surya rode in a rajasiha-drawn chariot on a red field represents his name "Aditya Dibabha" and also his paternal house of Abhakara which derives from his father's name. In addition, this emblem is based on the seal of Solar Sphere used by Somdet Chaophraya Borom Maha Sri Suriwongse, represents Bunnag family, the maternal ancestor house of Abhakara Kiartivongse, progenitor of the house of Abhakara. A Chakram, anchor, and wings is the emblem of the Royal Thai Armed Forces. A navy blue field represents the Prince is a Royal Thai Navy commissioned officer who hold the ranks of major general of the Royal Thai Army, vice admiral of the Royal Thai Navy and air marshal of the Royal Thai Air Force.

Aditya Dibabha House of Abhakara Cadet branch of the House of Chakri Born: 27 July 1900 Died: 19 May 1946
Civic offices
Preceded by Phraya Srisuthat	Governor of Nakhon Pathom; 1931 – 1933	Succeeded by Phraya Phiphit Amphon
Preceded by Phraya Amomsakpasit	Governor of Phuket; 1933	Succeeded by Phraya Suriyadej Ronnachit
