= Bhanubandhu Yugala =

Thai film director, producer and screenwriter

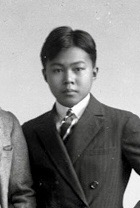
- Bhanubandhu Yugala in 1929
- Born: 27 November 1910; Songkhla, Siam
- Died: 5 February 1995 (aged 84); Bangkok, Thailand
- Spouse: Mom Luang Soiraya Sanidvongs; Bunlom Nartrakul; Prim Bunnag; Chailai Thavorn
- Issue: Princess Bandhusawali Yugala; Prince Thitibandhu Yugala; Princess Rangsinobhadol Yugala; Prince Bhuribandhu Yugala; Prince Navabarn Yugala; Princess Bhanuma Yugala
- House: Yugala family (Chakri Dynasty)
- Father: Prince Yugala Dighambara
- Mother: Princess Chalermkhetra Mangala

Prince Bhanubandhu Yugala (Thai: พระเจ้าวรวงศ์เธอ พระองค์เจ้าภาณุพันธุ์ยุคล; RTGS: Phanuphan Yukhon, 27 November 1910 – 5 February 1995) was a Thai film director, producer and screenwriter, playwright, composer and author.

He was a grandson of King Chulalongkorn, the maternal grandfather of Princess Soamsawali Kitiyakara and an uncle of director Chatrichalerm Yukol. His nickname was Sadet Ong Chaiyai.

== Biography ==
=== Early life and career ===
Prince Bhanubandhu was the eldest of three children of Prince Yugala Dighambara and Princess Chalermkhet Mongkhol. He was a grandson of King Chulalongkorn. He was educated in Thailand at Thepsirin School, and then in France. He also lived abroad in his youth in England and the United States. In his 20s, he returned to Thailand and enlisted in the Royal Thai Army's cavalry division. While in the army, he studied filmmaking in his spare time.

In 1936, Prince Bhanubandhu's youngest brother, Prince Anusorn Mongkolkarn, founded the Lavoe Motion Pictures, and produced its first film, Naam Yok Ok (The Thorn in Your Side). Prince Bhanubandhu founded his own company, the Thai Film Company, in 1938, first producing the film, Tharn Fai Kao (The Old Flame). Four other films followed: Wan Phen, Mae Sue Sao (Girl Matchmaker), Pid Thong Lang Phru and Look Thung (The Folks). The company was disbanded during World War II, with its assets sold to the Royal Thai Air Force. Film historians believe that the films were destroyed during the war.

=== Post-war years ===
After the war ended, Bhanubandhu formed a new production company, Assawin Pictures. Among his works were Phantay Norasingh (Oarsman Norasingh), which was based on a play he wrote in 1942. For the film version, he hired a then-budding cinematographer, Rattana Pestonji.

Another film by Bhanubandhu was based on the legend of King Naresuan the Great.

Bhanubandhu pushed for innovations in the Thai film industry, often spending his family's fortune to buy equipment for poorer directors. He encouraged the use of 35-mm film over 16-mm films, which was the industry standard in Thailand.

He produced the first Thai film in CinemaScope, Ruen Phae (Raft Home), a co-production with Shaw Brothers Studio.

Bhanubandhu also composed the score for his films. One of his songs from 1938's Tharn Fai Kao, was selected in 1979 by UNESCO as a "Song of Asia".

"It was a sort of hobby that was professional," the prince said about his work in an interview with Di-Chan magazine. "I could do it much better than a professional. I did the job all by myself, from composing the story, writing the script and shooting the film, to editing it all. It was tiring work, but I am the sort of person who is determined to do a thing until it is completed and at its best."

== Family ==
Prince Bhanubandhu was the eldest of three brothers. His younger brother was Prince Chalermbala Dighambara, while his youngest brother was Prince Anusorn Mongkolkarn, the father of director Chatrichalerm Yukol. Prince Bhanubandhu was married three times and had seven children. In his first marriage to Mom Luang Soiraya (Soraya), he fathered Mom Chao Bhandhusawali Kitiyakara, the mother of Her Royal Highness Princess Soamsawali Kitiyakara, the first wife of King Rama X. Other children were M.C. Thitibhan Yukol, M.C. Rangsinopphadol. Bhanubandhu then married Mom Boonlom, producing M.C. Bhuribhan Yukol. His third marriage to Mom Chailai (who was twenty when they married in 1976, he sixty-six) produced M.C. Navabarn Yugala and M.C. Bhanuma Yugala.

Prince Bhanubandhu died at the age of 85 of blood poisoning.

== Honours ==
=== Foreign honours ===
Emblem of Bhanabandhu Yugala as a Knight of the Order of the Seraphim

- Sweden : Knight of the Royal Order of the Seraphim (15/01/1965).
- Empire of Iran : Commemorative Medal of the 2500th Anniversary of the founding of the Persian Empire (14/10/1971).
- Malaysia : Honorary Grand Commander of the Order of Loyalty to the Crown of Malaysia (01/02/1973).
- Nepal : King Birendra Coronation Medal (24/02/1975).
- Argentina: Grand Cross of the Order of the Liberator General San Martín
- Japan: Grand Cordon of the Order of the Rising Sun with Paulownia Flowers

Bhanubandhu Yugala House of Yugala Cadet branch of the House of Chakri Born: 27 November 1910 Died: 5 February 1995
Academic offices
| Preceded by Phraya Anuman Rajadhon | Director of Silpakorn University; 1949 – 1951 | Succeeded by Luang Ronnasitphichai |
