= Yugala Dighambara =

Prince of Lopburi (1882–1932)

Yugala Dighambara ยุคลฑิฆัมพร
- Prince of Lopburi
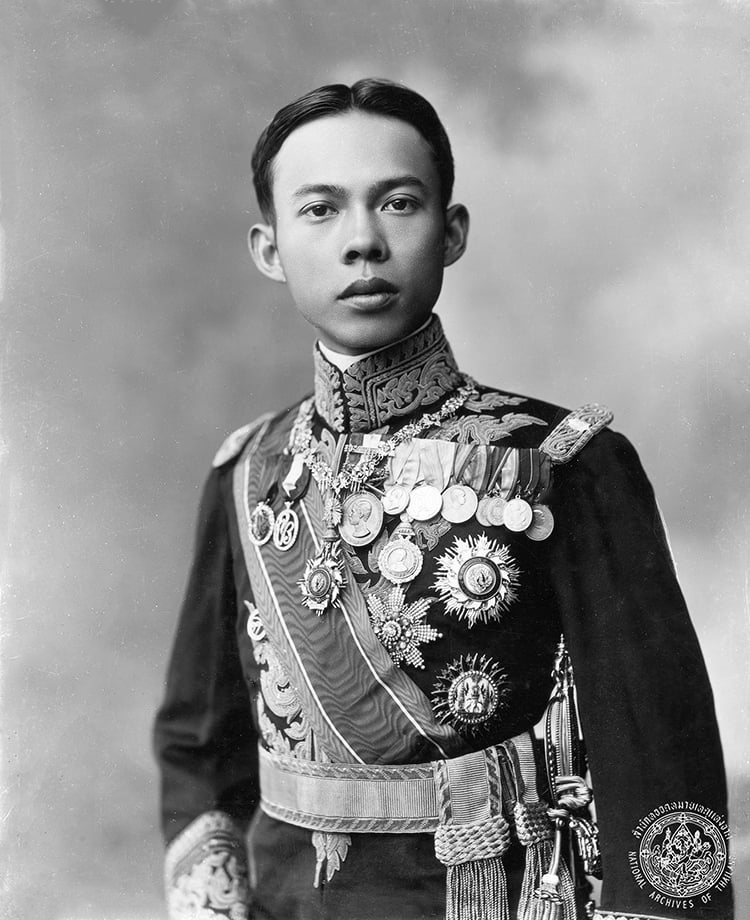

Minister of Interior
- In office: May 1926 – April 1928
- Predecessor: Pan Sukhum
- Successor: Prince of Nakorn Sawan
- Born: 17 March 1882; Bangkok, Siam
- Died: 8 April 1932 (aged 49); Bangkok, Siam
- Spouse: Princess Chalermkhetra Mangala; Lada Supradit
- Issue: Prince Bhanubandhu Yugala; Prince Chalermbol Dighambara; Prince Anusorn Mongkolkarn
Names
- Yugala Dighambara Chulalongkorn Rajravivongsa Ubhaiyabhongbhisuti Varutamobhatosuchati Borommanat Rajakumarn
- House: Yugala family (Chakri Dynasty)
- Father: Chulalongkorn (Rama V)
- Mother: Saisavali Bhiromya

Yugala Dighambara, Prince of Lopburi (Note: Thai: สมเด็จพระเจ้าบรมวงศ์เธอ เจ้าฟ้ายุคลฑิฆัมพร กรมหลวงลพบุรีราเมศร์, RTGS: Chao Fa Yukhon Thikhamphon Krom Luang Lopburi Ramet) (17 March 1882 – 8 April 1932), was a son of King Chulalongkorn of Siam.

== Early life and education ==
The Prince graduated from Cambridge University. He served as royal commissioner of Monthon Nakhon Si Thammarat (a large administrative region in Southern Thailand) during the reign of his half-brother King Vajiravhud from 1910 to 1925 and as the Minister of the Interior (Mahatthai) of Siam in the government of King Prajadhipok from 1926 to 1928.

== Personal life ==
He married Princess Chalermkhetra Mangala (Bhanubandh), a daughter of Prince Bhanurangsi Savangwongse. Their grandson is the filmmaker Prince Chatrichalerm Yugala.

== Death ==
According to the announcement of his death in the Royal Gazette, Prince Yugala Dighambara suffered from heart disease, dying at 3:05 p.m. on 8 April 1932.

== Honours ==
Prince Yugala Dighambara received the following decorations in the Honours System of Thailand:

- Knight of The Most Illustrious Order of the Royal House of Chakri
- Knight of The Ancient and Auspicious Order of the Nine Gems
- Knight Grand Cordon (Special Class) of The Most Illustrious Order of Chula Chom Klao
- The Knight of the Ratana Varabhorn Order of Merit
- Knight Grand Cordon (Special Class) of the Most Exalted Order of the White Elephant
- Knight Grand Cross (First Class) of the Most Noble Order of the Crown of Thailand
- Knight Commander of the Honourable Order of Rama
- Dushdi Mala Medal Pin of Arts and Science (Military)
- King Rama IV Royal Cypher Medal, Second Class
- King Rama V Royal Cypher Medal, First Class
- King Rama VI Royal Cypher Medal, First Class
- King Rama VII Royal Cypher Medal, First Class

=== Arms ===
Coat of arms of the Prince of Lopburi
Adopted 1890 Crest The Chada pin Jigha (coronet) named "Jata Maha Kathin" (A royal crown for the great Kathina festival). Escutcheon Per fess, the chief per pale. Orange dexter chief with Or Great Crown of Victory. Rose sinister chief with a Phra kiao (coronet) with halo on top of pillow. Azure base with the stars (the constellation) of Gemini. Symbolism A Great Crown of Victory with rays of light emitting from the top and a Urna on an orange field represents the Prince is a grandson of King Mongkut who was born on Wednesday. Phra kiao (coronet) with halo on top of pillow on a pink field represents the Prince is a son of King Chulalongkorn who was born on Tuesday. The constellation of Gemini comes from his name "Yugala" which means a twin or double things in Sanskrit language. Azure base is an auspicious color of the Prince who was born on Saturday. Other versions

== Notes ==
Yugala Dighambara House of Yugala Cadet branch of the House of Chakri Born: 17 March 1882 Died: 8 April 1932
Political offices
Preceded by Chaophraya Yommarat	Minister of Interior; 1926 – 1928	Succeeded by Paribatra Sukhumbandhu
Civic offices
Preceded by Phraya Chonlaburanurak	Commissioner of Nakhon Si Thammarat; 1910 – 1925	Succeeded by Phraya Surintharacha
First	Viceroy of the Southern; 1916 – 1926	Office abolished
