= Debsirindra =

Queen of Siam from 1852 to 1862

Debsirindra; เทพศิรินทรา
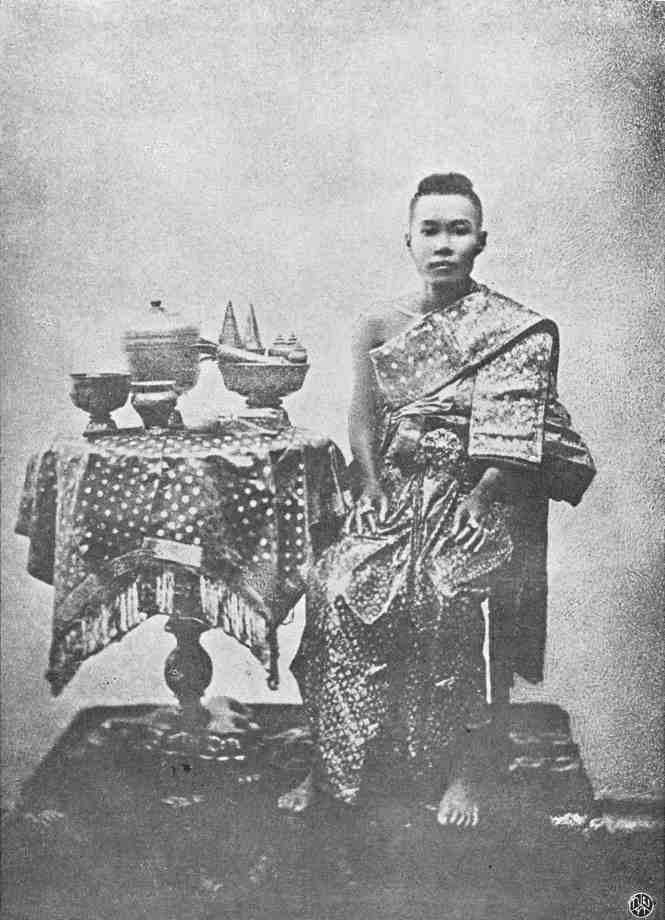

Queen consort of Siam
- Tenure: 6 January 1852 – 9 September 1862
- Born: Ramphoei Siriwong; 17 July 1834; Bangkok, Siam
- Died: 9 September 1862 (aged 28); Bangkok, Siam
- Spouse: Mongkut (Rama IV)
- Issue: Chulalongkorn (Rama V); Chandrmondol; Chaturonrasmi; Bhanurangsi Savangwongse
Posthumous name
- Somdet Phra Debsirindra Boromma Rajini
- Dynasty: Chakri
- Father: Siriwong
- Mother: Noi Siriwongse Na Ayudhaya
- Religion: Theravada Buddhism

Debsirindra (Thai: เทพศิรินทรา, RTGS: Thepsirinthra, Devaśirindrā), formerly Ramphoei Phamaraphirom (Thai: รำเพยภมราภิรมย์), born Ramphoei Siriwong (Thai: รำเพย ศิริวงศ์; 17 July 1834 – 9 September 1862), was the second consort of King Mongkut, and mother of King Chulalongkorn.

== Biography ==
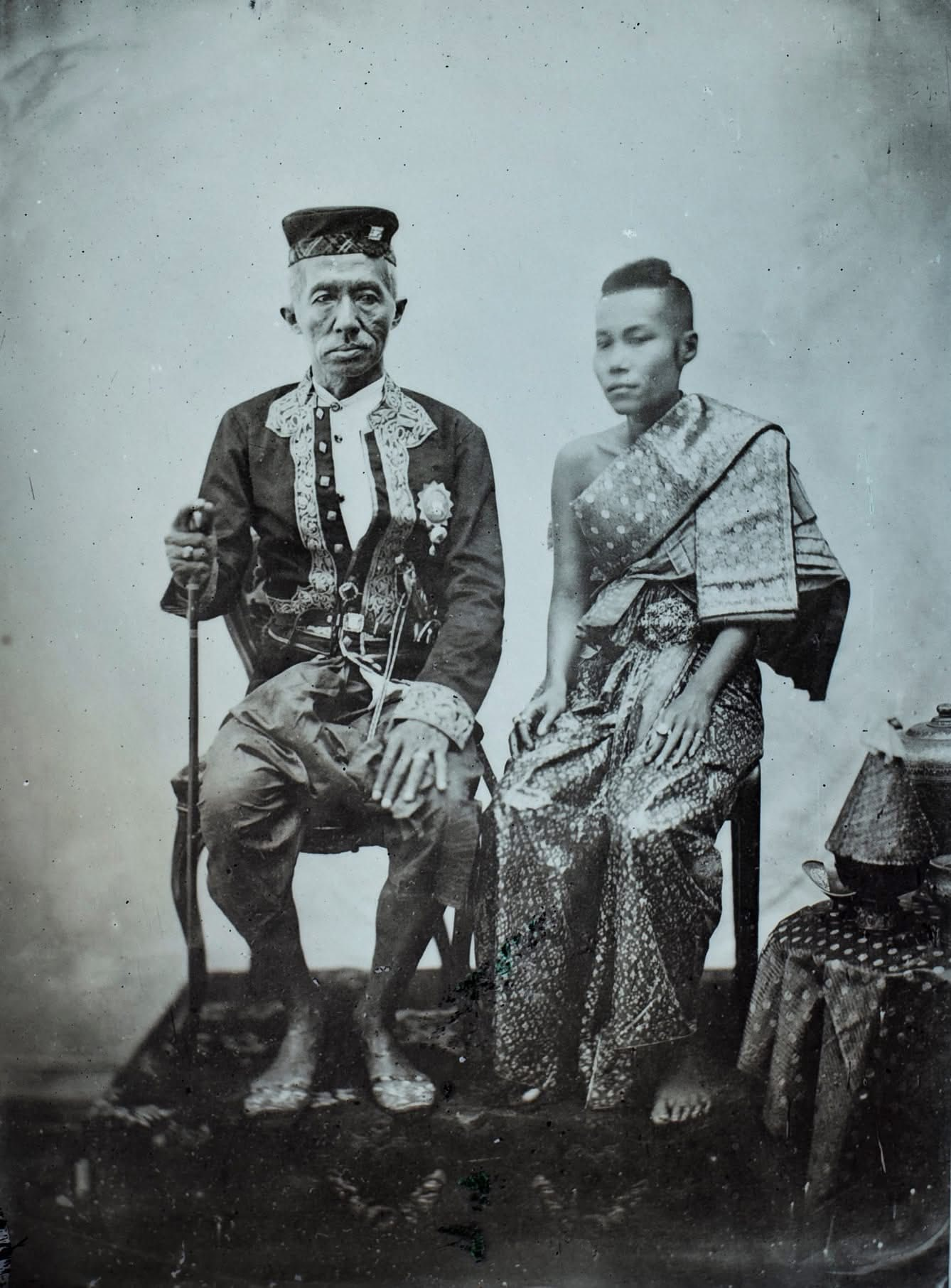
King Mongkut and Queen Debsirindra

Princess Ramphoei was born in 1834 to Siriwong, Prince Mattayaphithak (son of Rama III and Concubine Sap) and Lady Noi (Mom Noi). She was of Mon descent. When her father died at only 27 years, her grandfather—the king—took her and her sister Phannarai to the Grand Palace and they were said to be his favourite grandchildren. In 1853, Ramphoei married her great-uncle Mongkut (who was 30 years her senior) and was raised to a Phra Ong Chao (a higher rank of princess). In the same year she gave birth to Prince Chulalongkorn. She later became Queen Ramphoei.

She had 4 children with King Mongkut.

1. Prince Chulalongkorn (จุฬาลงกรณ์), later King Chulalongkorn (1853–1910)
2. Princess Chandrmondol / Chanthonmonthon (จันทรมณฑล), later the Princess Wisutkrasat (1855–1863)
3. Prince Chaturonrasmi / Chaturon Ratsami (จาตุรนต์รัศมี), later the Prince Chakrabardibongse (1856–1900)
4. Prince Bhanurangsi Savangwongse (ภาณุรังษีสว่างวงศ์), later the Prince Bhanubandhuwongse Voradej (1859–1928)

Queen Ramphoei died in 1861. Her sister (who was also Mongkut's wife), Princess Phannarai, acted as Mongkut's consort for the remainder of his reign. When Chulalongkorn was crowned in 1867, she was posthumously given the title Debsirindramataya, the Queen Mother. Her grandson, Vajiravudh (Rama VI), gave her the name Queen Debsirindra.

== In popular culture ==
- Portrayed by Judy Dan in the 1956 American film The King and I
- Portrayed by Ratna Assan in the 1972 CBS TV series Anna and the King
- Portrayed by Chalisa Boonkrongsupya in the 2010 RTA5 TV drama Phra Manda 3 Maharat Thai

Debsirindra House of Siriwongse Cadet branch of the House of Chakri Born: 17 July 1834 Died: 9 September 1862
Thai royalty
Preceded by Somanass	Queen consort of Siam; 1852–1862	Vacant Title next held by Saovabha Phongsri
