= Orders, decorations, and medals of Thailand =

State decorations awarded by the king of Thailand take the form of orders and medals. This page lists them by order of precedence.

Coat of Arms of Thailand

== Royal decorations ==
Royal orders

- The Most Auspicious Order of the Rajamitrabhorn
- The Most Illustrious Order of the Royal House of Chakri
- The Ancient and Auspicious Order of the Nine Gems
- The Most Illustrious Order of Chula Chom Klao
- The Ratana Varabhorn Order of Merit
- The Honourable Order of Rama
- The Most Exalted Order of the White Elephant
- The Most Noble Order of the Crown of Thailand
- The Most Admirable Order of the Direkgunabhorn
- The Vallabhabhorn Order
- The Order of Symbolic Propitiousness Ramkeerati
- The Vajira Mala Order

Order of precedence

Ribbon	Honour	Post-nominal letters
	Knight of the Most Auspicious Order of the Rajamitrabhorn	RMBh (KRM)
	Knight of the Most Illustrious Order of the Royal House of Chakri	MChK (KC)
	Knight of the Ancient and Auspicious Order of the Nine Gems	NR (KNG)
	Knight Grand Cordon of the Most Illustrious Order of Chula Chom Klao	PChW (KGC)
	Knight Grand Cross of the Most Illustrious Order of Chula Chom Klao	PCh (GCC)
	Dame Grand Cross of the Most Illustrious Order of Chula Chom Klao	PCh (GCC)
	Knight Grand Commander of the Most Illustrious Order of Chula Chom Klao	ThChW (KGCC)
	Dame Grand Commander of the Most Illustrious Order of Chula Chom Klao	ThChW (DGCC)
	Knight Commander of the Most Illustrious Order of Chula Chom Klao	ThCh (KCC)
	Dame Commander of the Most Illustrious Order of Chula Chom Klao	ThCh (DCC)
	Grand Companion of the Most Illustrious Order of Chula Chom Klao	TChW (GOC)
	Companion of the Most Illustrious Order of Chula Chom Klao	TCh (OC)
	Junior Companion of the Most Illustrious Order of Chula Chom Klao	TACh (JOC)
	Member of the Most Illustrious Order of Chula Chom Klao	ChCh (MC)
	Knight of the Ratana Varabhorn Order of Merit	RV (KRV)
	"Senangapati", Knight Grand Commander of the Honourable Order of Rama	SR (GCR)
	Knight Grand Cordon of the Most Exalted Order of the White Elephant	MPCh (GCE)
	Knight Grand Cordon of the Most Noble Order of the Crown of Thailand	MVM (GCCT)
	Knight Grand Cross of the Most Exalted Order of the White Elephant	PCh (KCE)
	Knight Grand Cross of the Most Noble Order of the Crown of Thailand	PM (KCCT)
	Knight Grand Cross of the Most Admirable Order of the Direkgunabhorn	PBh (KCD)
	"Maha Yodhin", Knight Commander of the Honourable Order of Rama	MR (KCR)
	Knight Commander of the Most Exalted Order of the White Elephant	DCh (KCE)
	Knight Commander of the Most Noble Order of the Crown of Thailand	DM (KCCT)
	Knight Commander of the Most Admirable Order of the Direkgunabhorn	ThBh (KCD)
	"Yodhin", Commander of the Honourable Order of Rama	YR (CR)
	Member of the Vallabhabhorn Order	VBh (MVO)
	"Asvin", Companion of the Honourable Order of Rama	AR (CR)
	Commander of the Most Exalted Order of the White Elephant	TCh (CE)
	Commander of the Most Noble Order of the Crown of Thailand	TM (CCT)
	Commander of the Most Admirable Order of the Direkgunabhorn	TBh (CD)
	Member of the Order of Symbolic Propitiousness Ramkeerati	(MR)
	Companion of the Most Exalted Order of the White Elephant	ChCh (OE)
	Companion of the Most Noble Order of the Crown of Thailand	ChM (OCT)
	Companion of the Most Admirable Order of the Direkgunabhorn	ChBh (OD)
	Member of the Most Exalted Order of the White Elephant	BCh (ME)
	Member of the Most Noble Order of the Crown of Thailand	BM (MCT)
	Member of the Most Admirable Order of the Direkgunabhorn	BBh (MD)
	Member of the Vajira Mala Order	VML (MVM)

== Royal medals ==
=== Medals for service to the monarch ===
Ribbon	Honour	Post-nominal letters
	King Mongkut's Royal Cypher Medal	MR1-5
	King Chulalongkorn's Royal Cypher Medal	CR1-5
	Dushdi Mala – Medal for Distinguished Services in Military Affairs (Ratchakan Nai Phra-ong)	RDM (P) (D.M.M. (P))
	Dushdi Mala – Medal for Distinguished Services in Arts and Sciences (Ratchakan Nai Phra-ong)	RDM (P) (D.M.M (P))
	King Vajiravudh's Royal Cypher Medal	VR1-5
	King Prajadhipok's Royal Cypher Medal	PR1-5
	King Ananda Mahidol's Royal Cypher Medal	AR1-5
	King Bhumibol Adulyadej's Royal Cypher Medal	BR1-5
	King Vajiralongkorn's Royal Cypher Medal	VR1-5
	King Chulalongkorn's Court Medal	RChTh5/RChNg5
	King Vajiravudh's Court Medal	RChTh6/RChNg6
	King Prajadhipok's Court Medal	RChTh7/RChNg7
	King Bhumibol Adulyadej's Court Medal	RChTh9/RChNg9
	King Vajiralongkorn's Court Medal	RChTh10/RChNg10

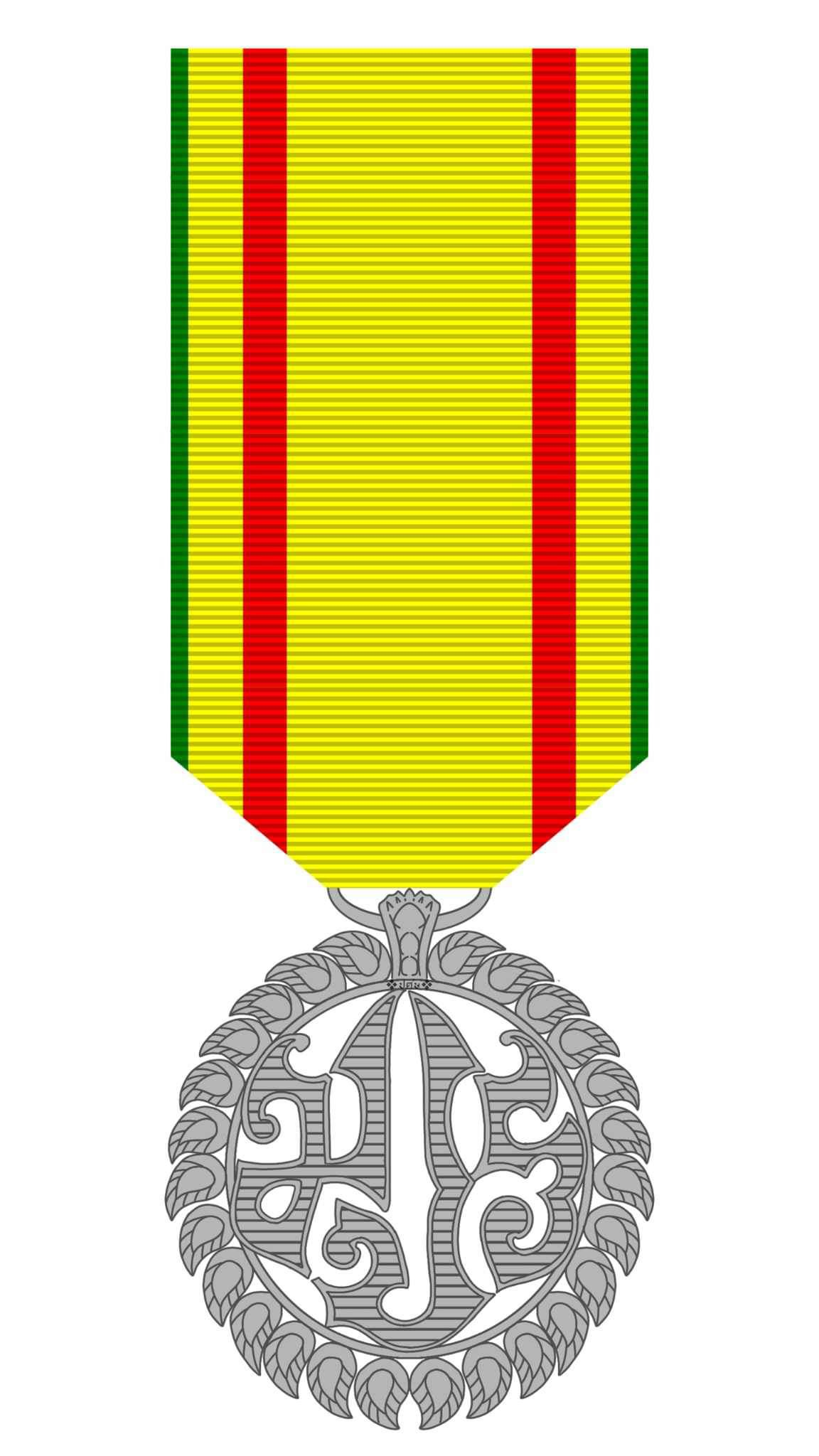
King Mongkut's Royal Cypher Medal, 5th class

King Chulalongkorn's Royal Cypher Medal, 1st class

King Vajiravudh's Royal Cypher Medal, 1st class

King Prajadhipok's Royal Cypher Medal, 1st class

King Ananda Mahidol's Royal Cypher Medal, 1st class

King Bhumibol Adulyadej's Royal Cypher Medal, 1st Class.svg

King Vajiralongkorn's Royal Cypher Medal, 1st class

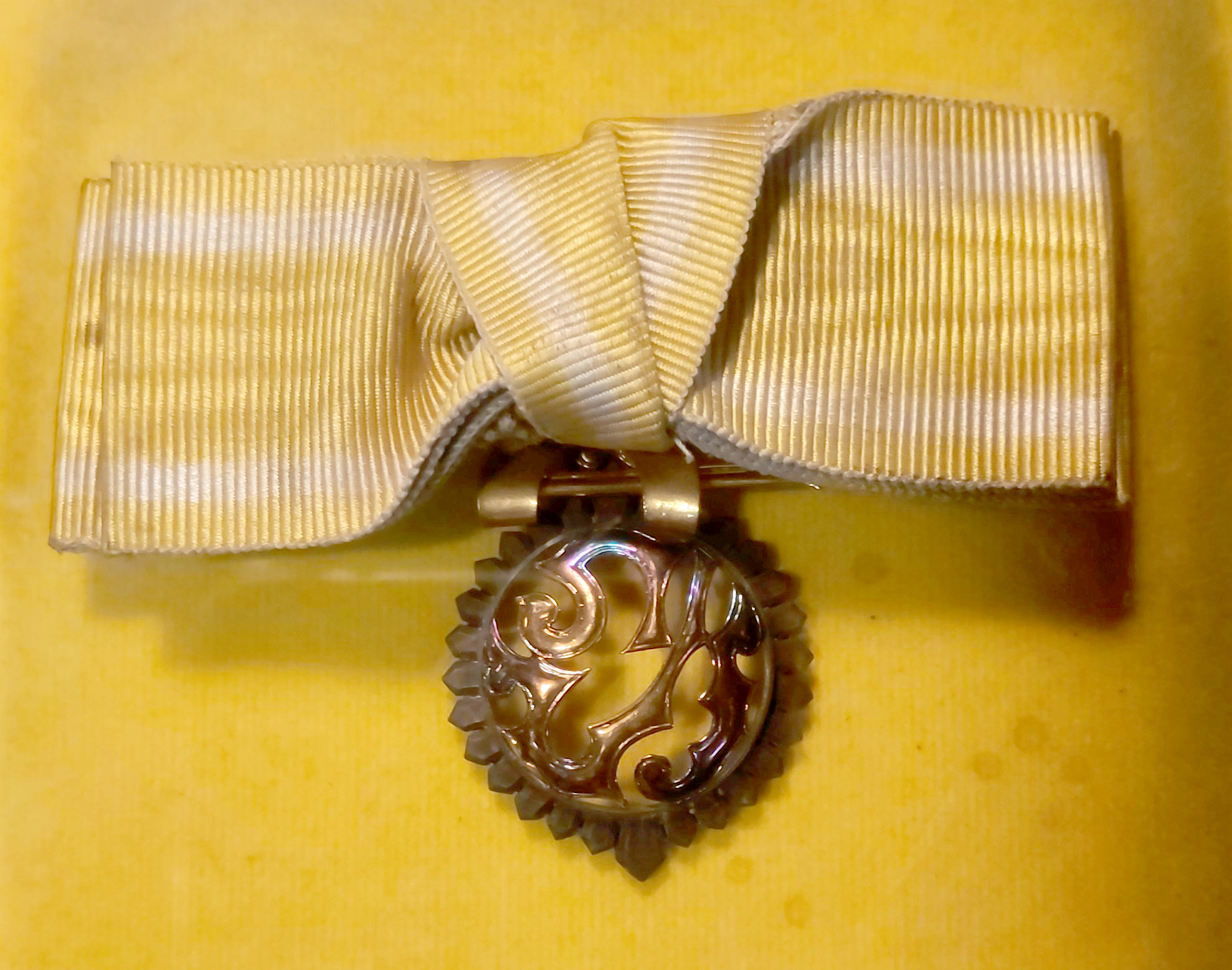
King Bhumibol Adulyadej's Royal Cypher Medal, 4th class (for ladies)

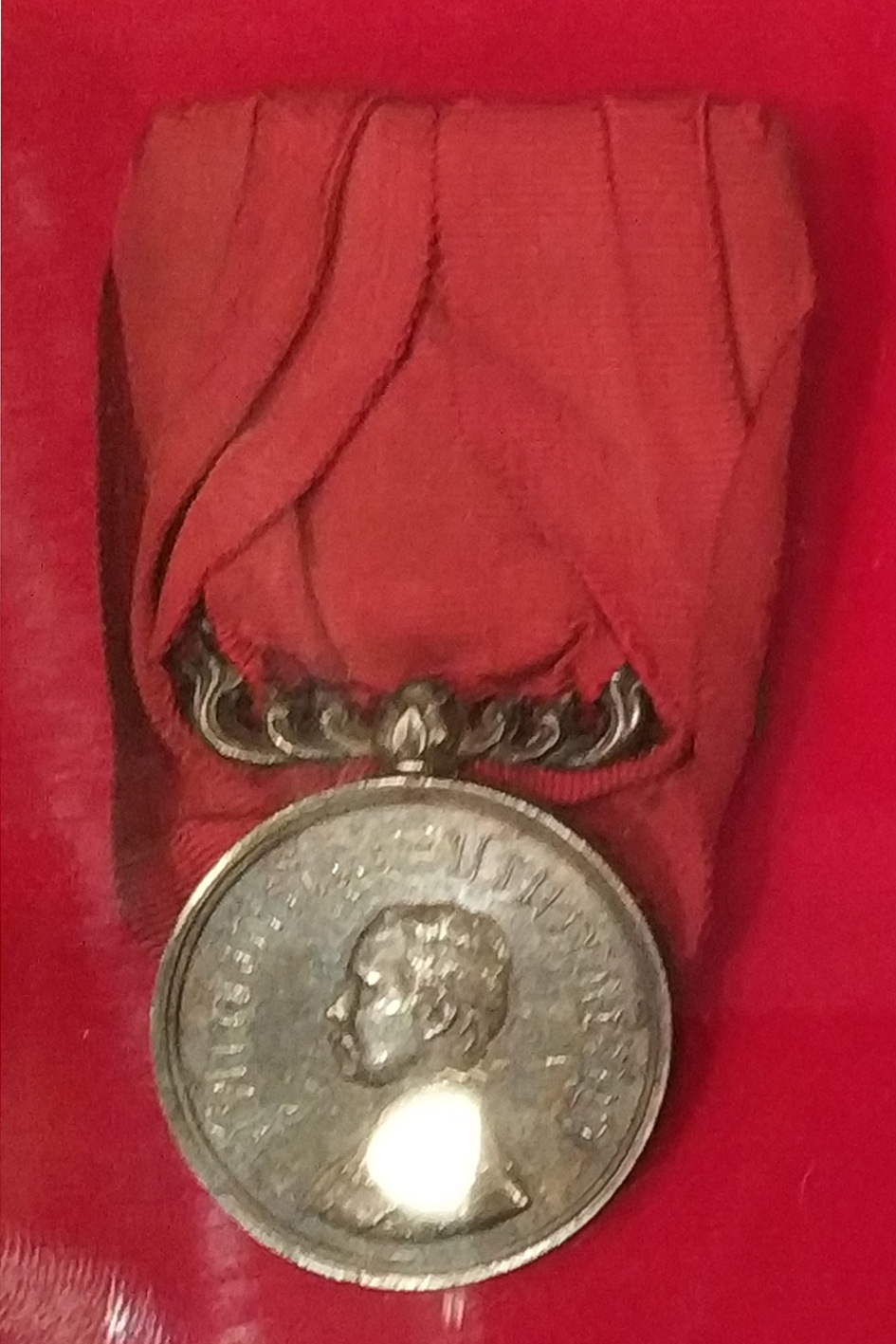
King Chulalongkorn's Court Medal

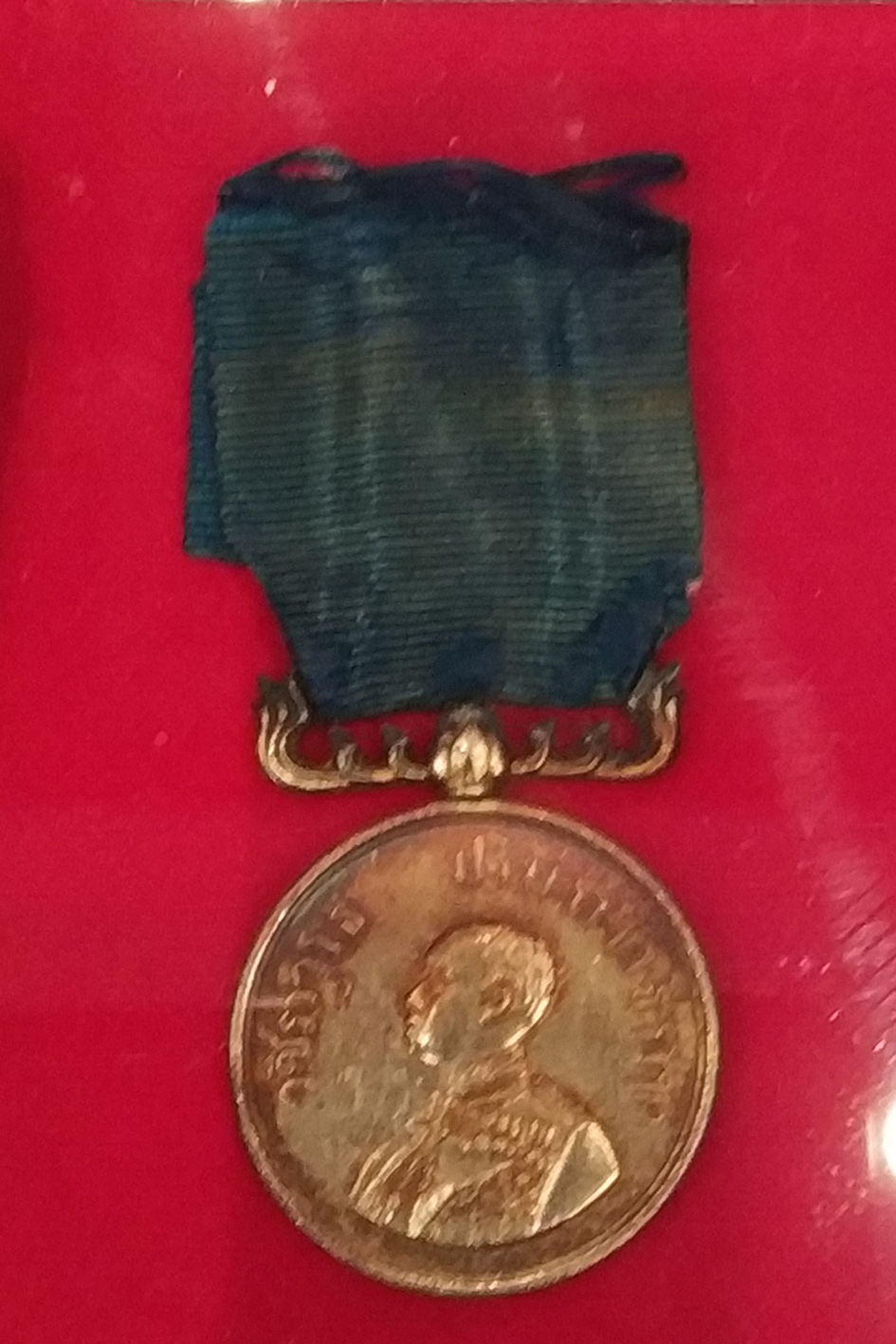
King Vajiravudh's Court Medal

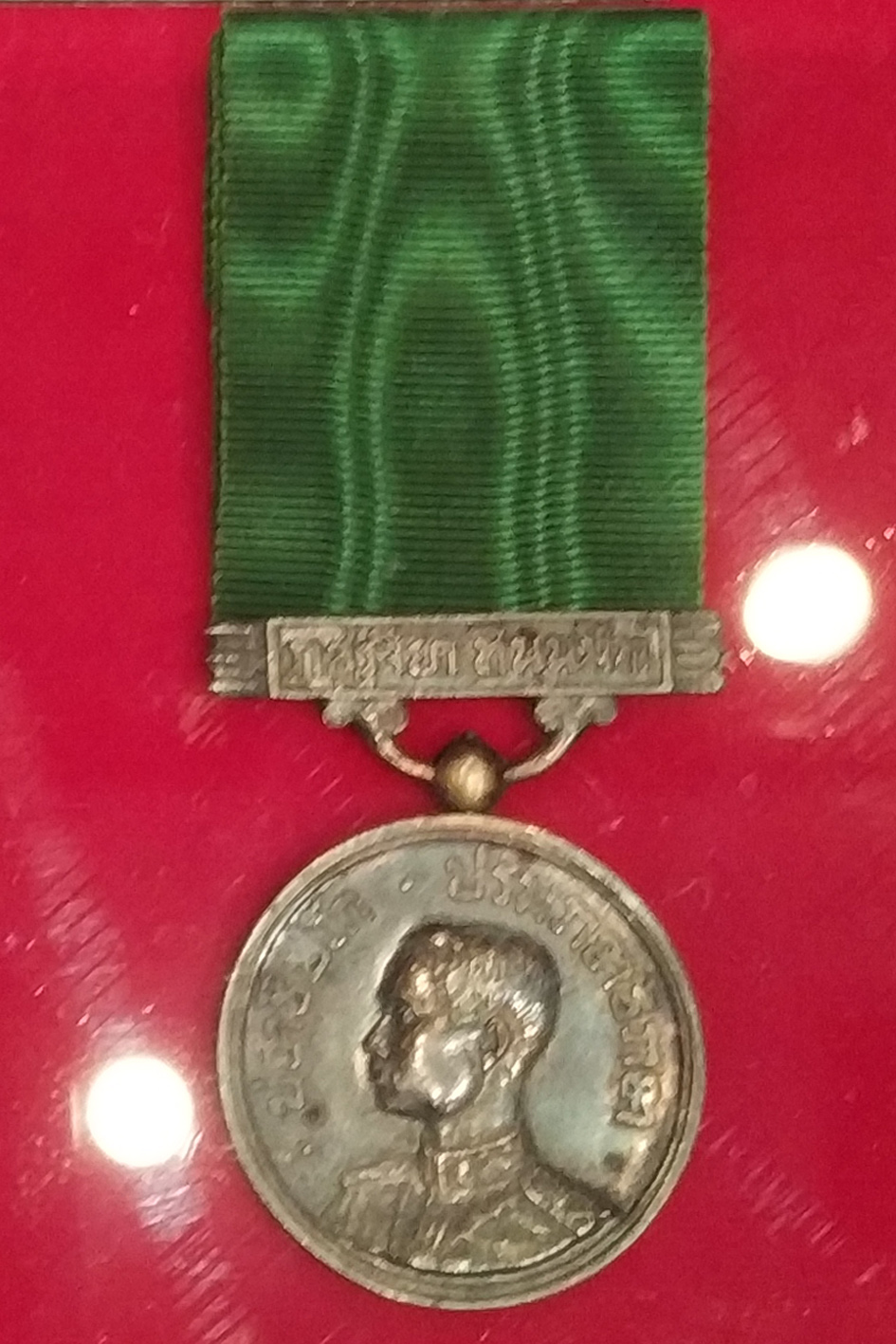
King Prajadhipok's Court Medal

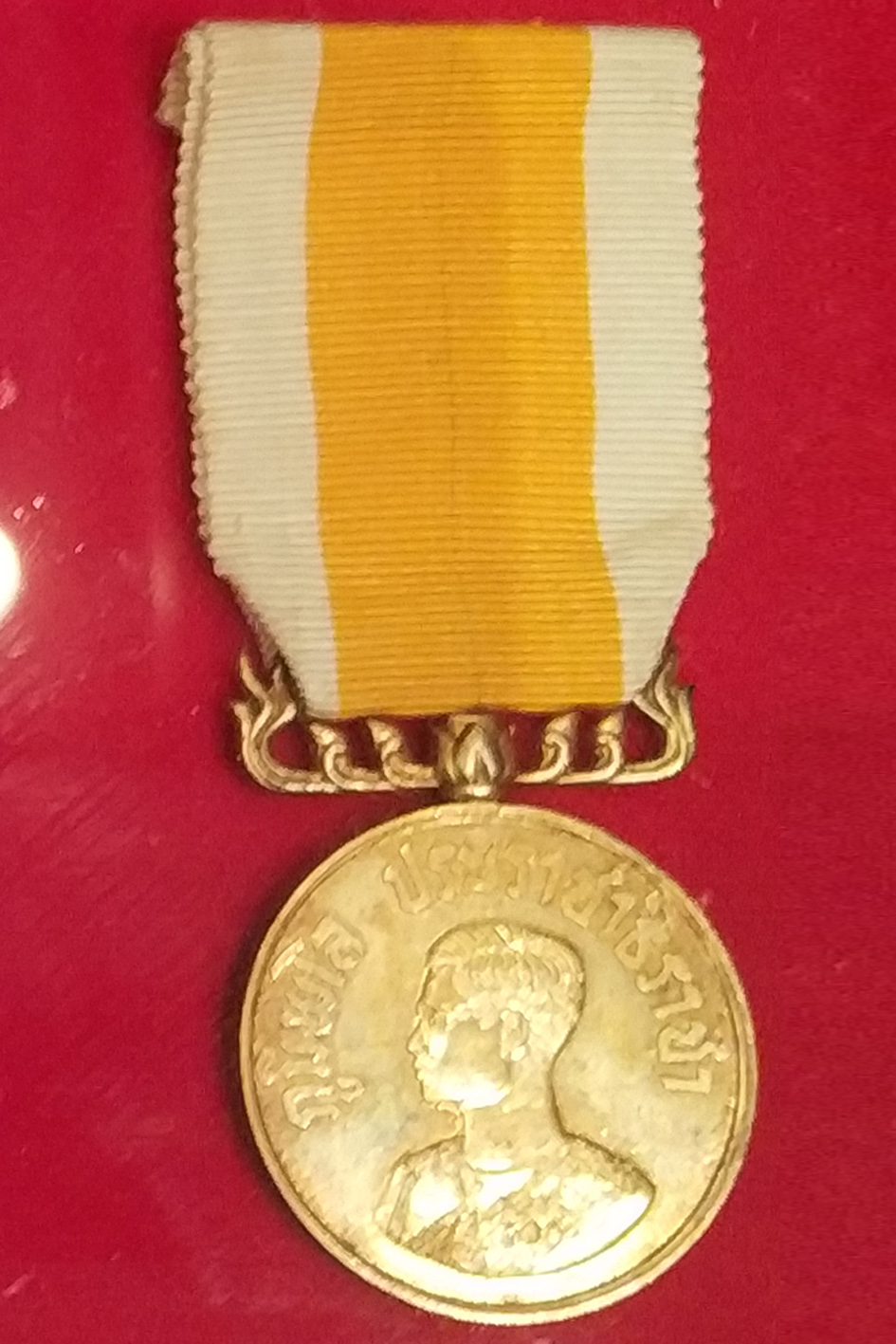
King Bhumibol Adulyadej's Court Medal

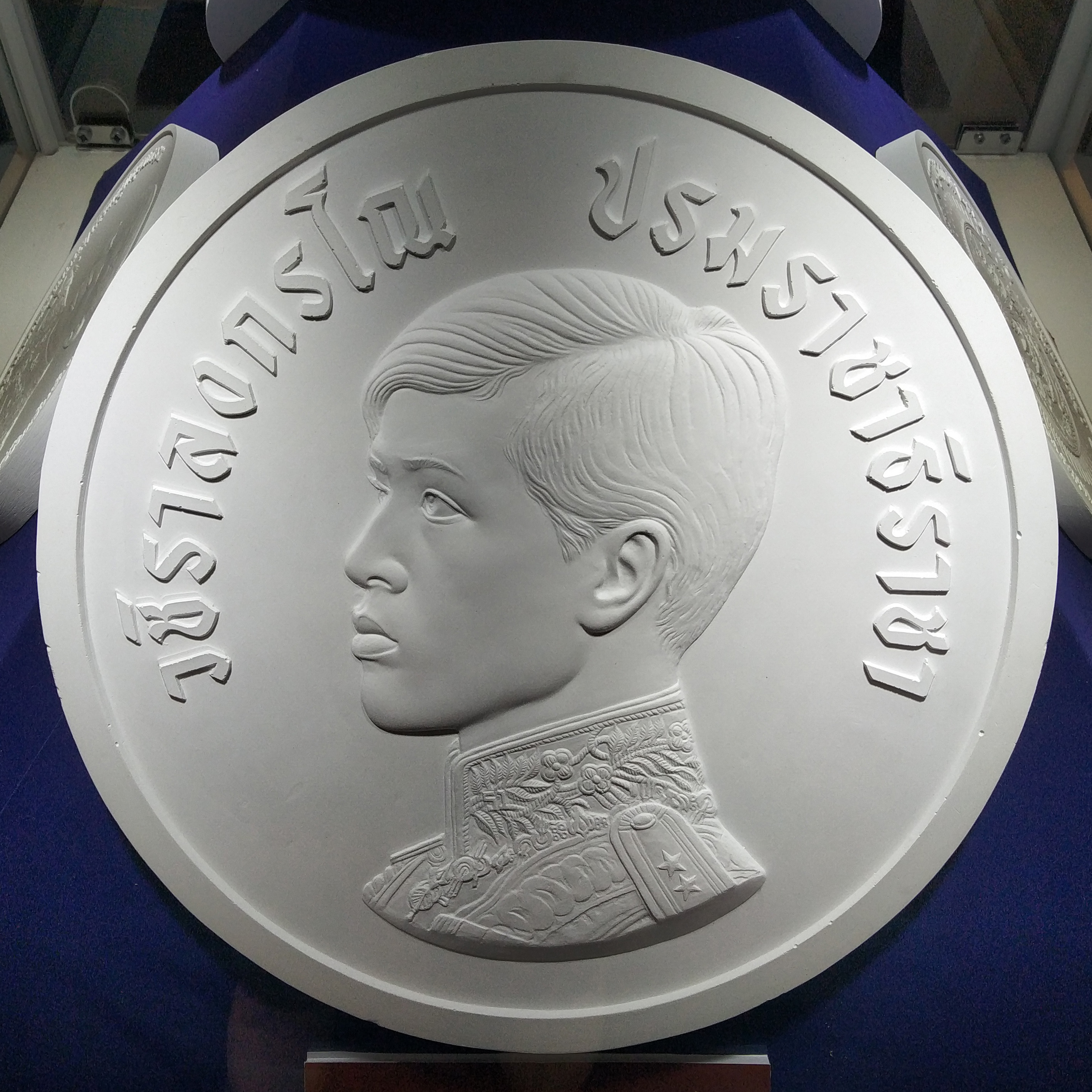
King Vajiralongkorn's Court Medal, obverse (plaster model)

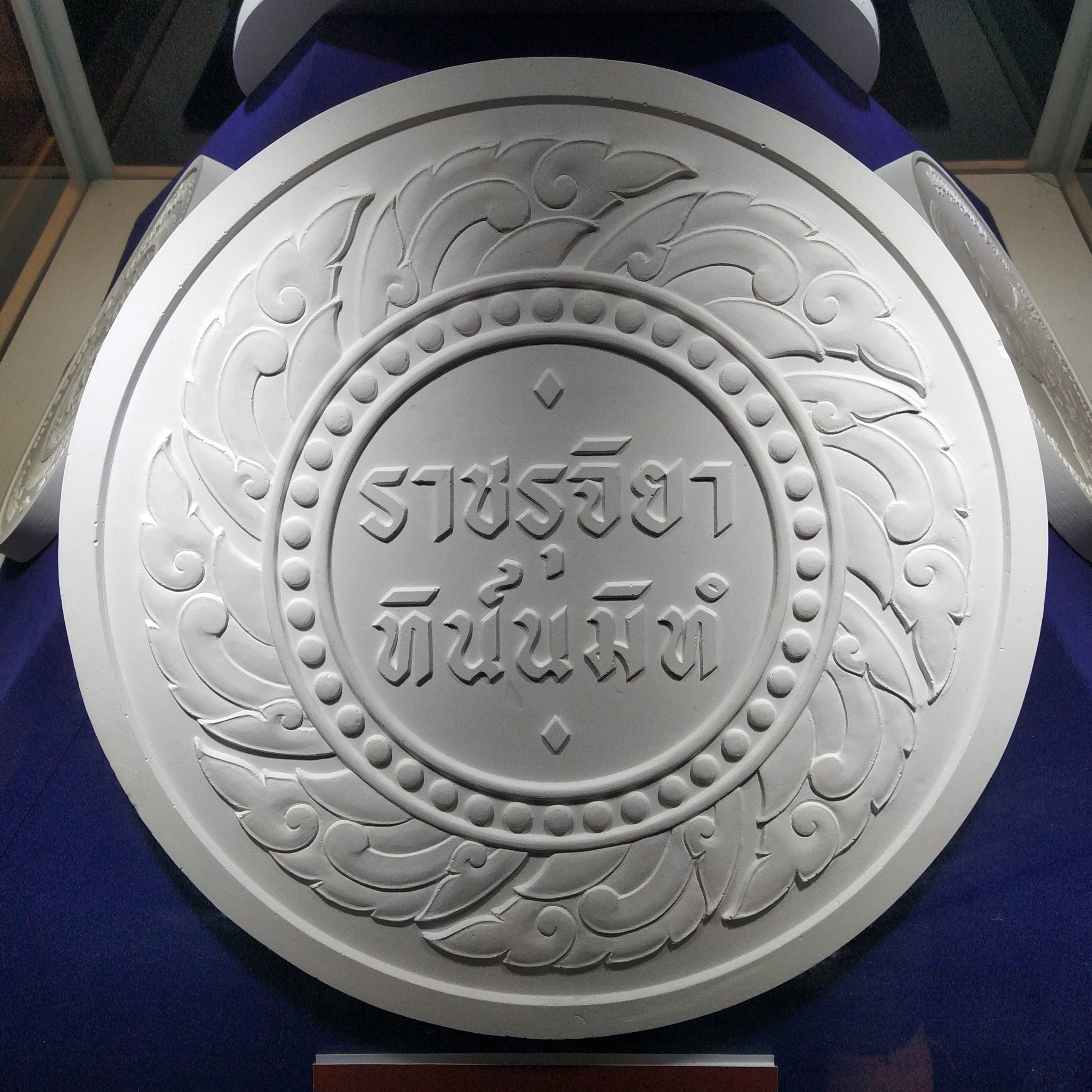
King Vajiralongkorn's Court Medal, reverse (plaster model)

=== Medals for acts of bravery ===
Ribbon	Honour	Post-nominal letters
	Member of the Rama Mala Medal for Gallantry in Action of the Honourable Order of Rama	RMK
	Member of the Rama Mala Medal of the Honourable Order of Rama	RM
	Klaharn – Bravery Medal	RK
	Dushdi Mala – Medal for acts of bravery in the military (Klaharn)	RDM (K) (D.M.M. (K))
	Chaisamornphum – Victory Medal – Franco - Thai War	ChS
	Victory Medal – Pacific War	ChS
	Victory Medal – Korean War	ChS
	Victory Medal – Vietnam War	ChS
	Freemen Safeguarding Medal (First Class)	SCh1
	Freemen Safeguarding Medal (Second Class, First Category)	SCh2/1
	Rajaniyom – Medal for Bravery of Civilians	RN
	Haw Campaign Medal	RPH
	War Medal of B.E. 2461	—
	Bitaksa Rathadharmnun – Safeguarding the Constitution Medal	BRDh
	Bitaksa Seri Chon – Freemen Safeguarding Medal (Second Class, Second Category)	SCh2/2
	Santi Mala – Medal for Calmness	SM

Rama Mala Medal for Gallantry in Action of the Honourable Order of Rama

Rama Mala Medal of the Honourable Order of Rama

Bravery Medal

Dushdi Mala – Medal for acts of bravery in the military (Klaharn)

Victory Medal (Indochina conflict)

Victory Medal (Greater East Asia War)

Victory Medal (Korean War)

Victory Medal (Vietnam War)

Freemen Safeguarding Medal (Second Class, Second Category)

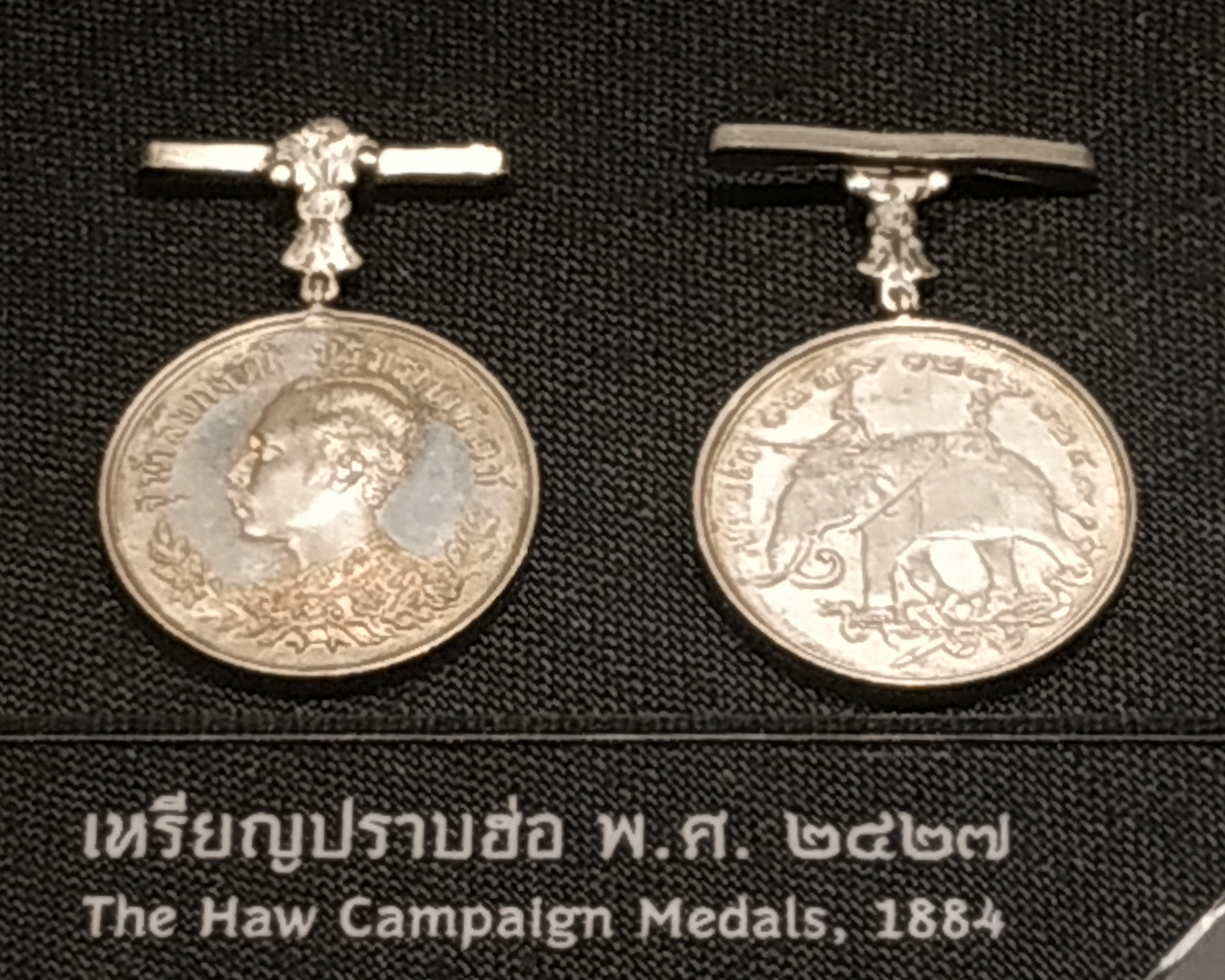
The Haw Campaign Medal

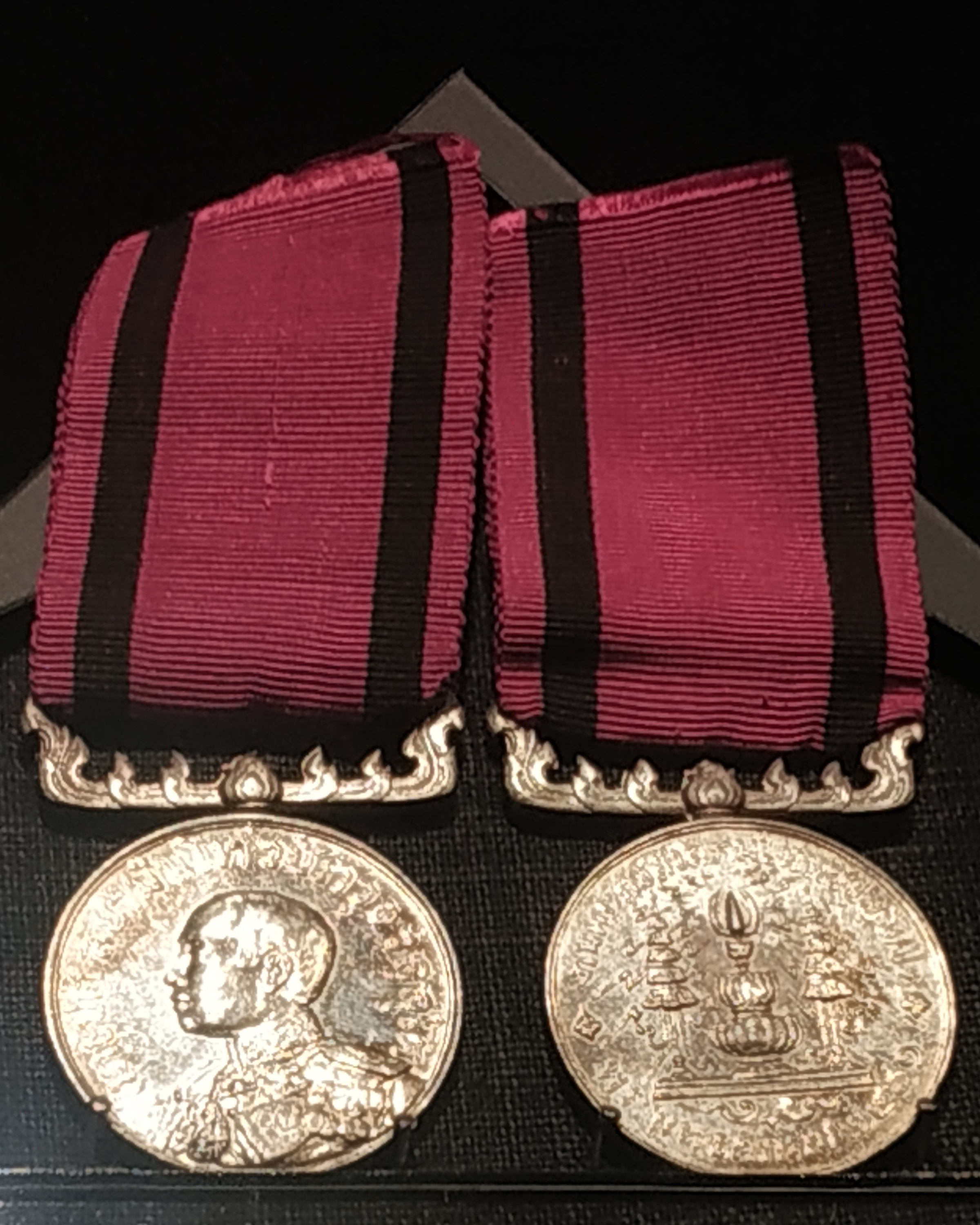
War Medal of B.E. 2461

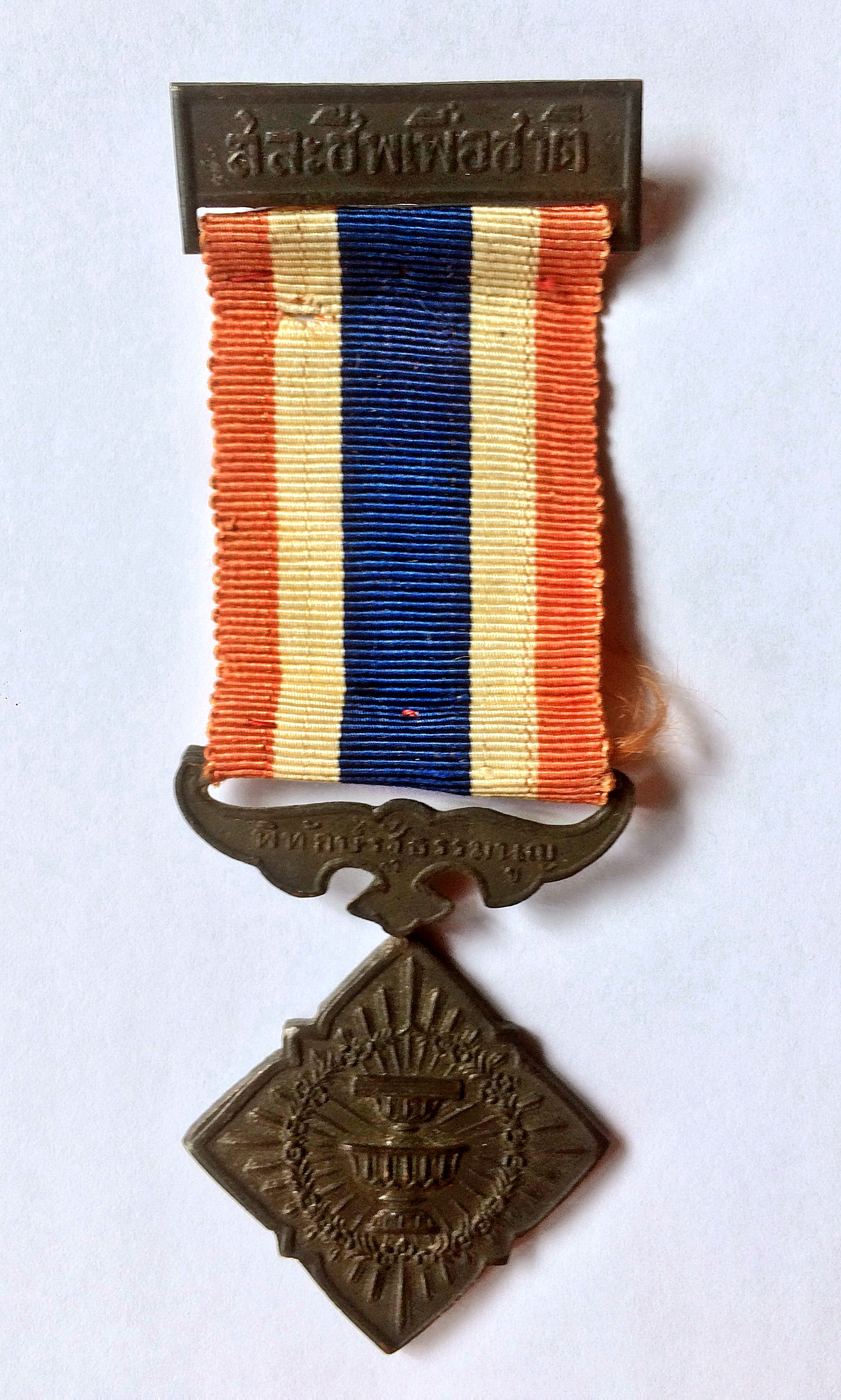
Safeguarding the Constitution Medal

=== Medals for service to the nation ===
Ribbon	Honour	Post-nominal letters
	Dushdi Mala – Medal for Distinguished Services in Military Affairs (Ratchakan Phaendin)	RDM (P) (D.M.M. (P))
	Dushdi Mala – Medal for Distinguished Services in Arts and Sciences (Sinlapa Witthaya)	RDM (S) (D.M.M (S))
	Medal for Service Rendered in the Interior – Franco-Thai War	ChR (M.S.I. (Franco-Thai War))
	Medal for Service Rendered in the Interior – Pacific War	ChR (M.S.I. (Pacific War))
	Border Service Medal	ChD (B.S.M.)
	Gold Medal (Sixth Class) of the Most Exalted Order White Elephant	RThCh (G.M.E.)
	Gold Medal (Sixth Class) of the Most Noble Order of Crown of Thailand	RThM (G.M.CT.)
	Gold Medal (Sixth Class) of the Most Admirable Order Direkgunabhorn	RThD (G.M.D.)
	Silver Medal (Seventh Class) of the Most Exalted Order White Elephant	RNgCh (S.M.E.)
	Silver Medal (Seventh Class) of the Most Noble Order of Crown of Thailand	RNgM (S.M.CT.)
	Silver Medal (Seventh Class) of the Most Admirable Order Direkgunabhorn	RNgD (S.M.D.)
	Chakra Mala Medal – Medal for Long Service and Good Conduct (Military and Police)	RChM (C.M.M)
	Chakrabarti Mala Medal – Medal for Long Service and Good Conduct (Civil)	RChB (C.B.M)
	Saradul Mala Medal – Medal for Volunteer Force (Wild Tiger)	RST (S.M.M)
	Pushpa Mala Medal – Medal for Technical Service	RPM (P.M.M)
	First Class of Boy Scout Commendation Medal	—
	Second Class of Boy Scout Commendation Medal	—
	Third Class of Boy Scout Commendation Medal	—
	First Class of Boy Scout Citation Medal of Vajira	—
	Second Class of Boy Scout Citation Medal of Vajira	—
	Third Class of Boy Scout Citation Medal of Vajira	—
	The Sustainable Scout Medal	—

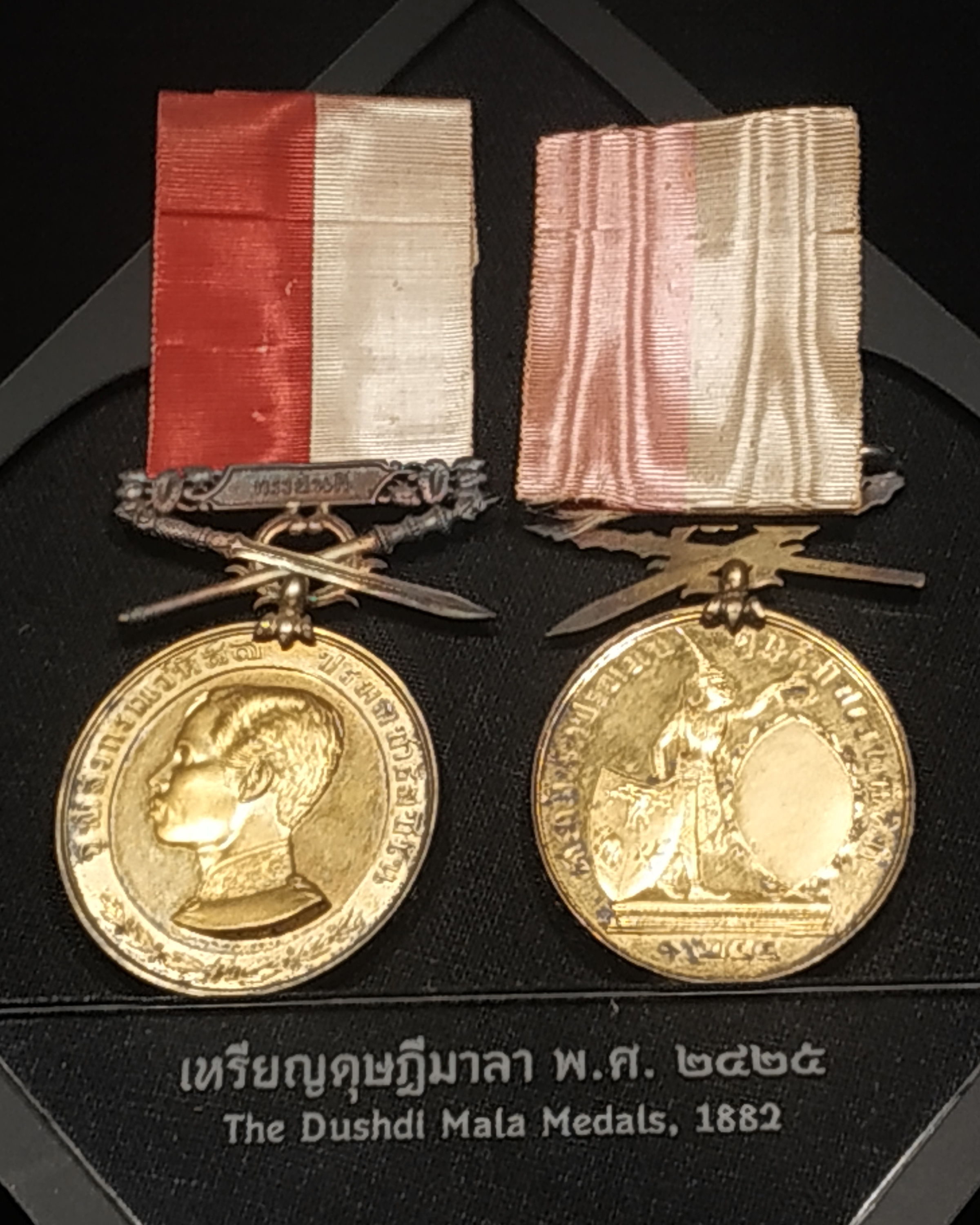
Dushdi Mala Medals

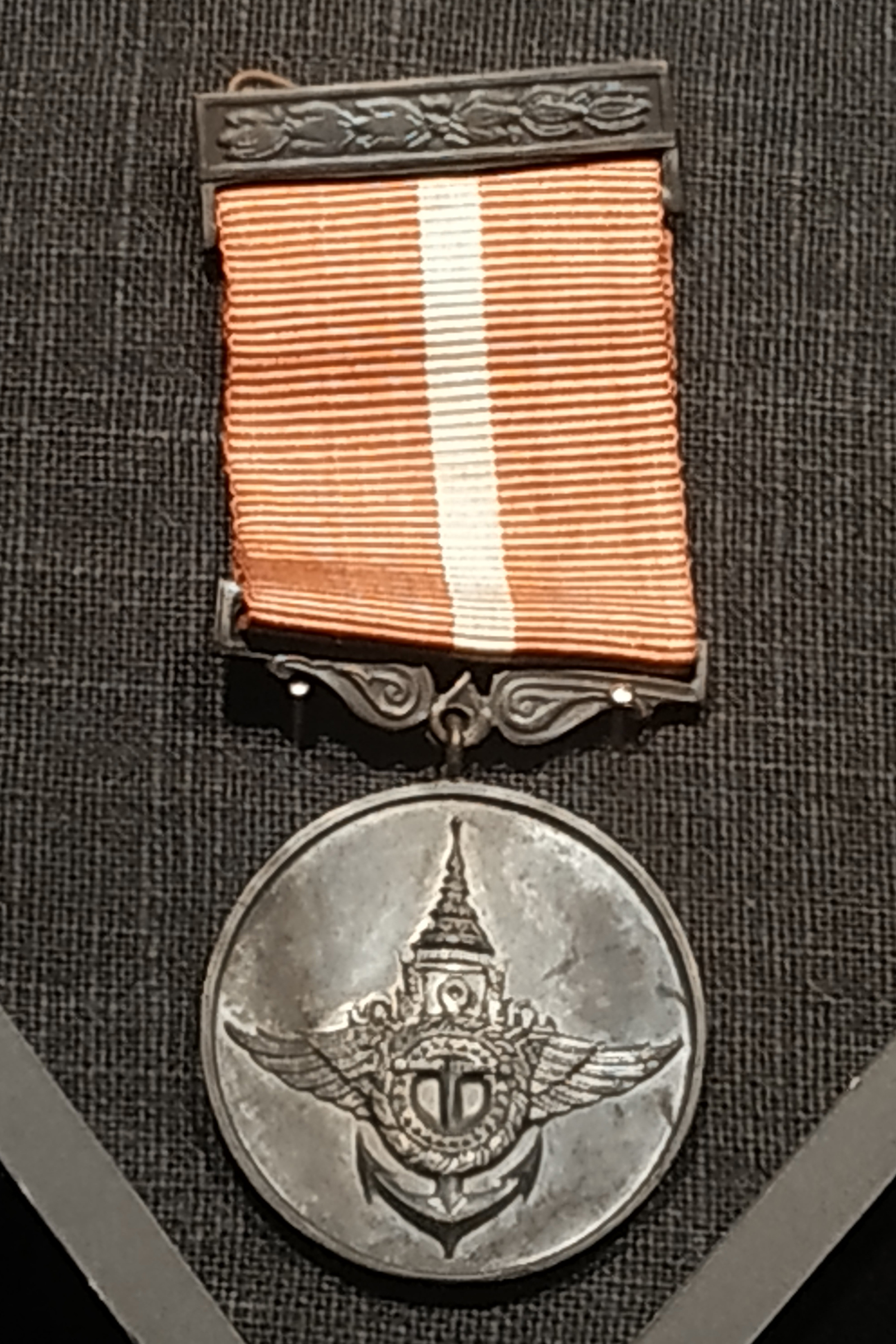
Medal for Service Rendered in the Interior (Indochina Conflict)

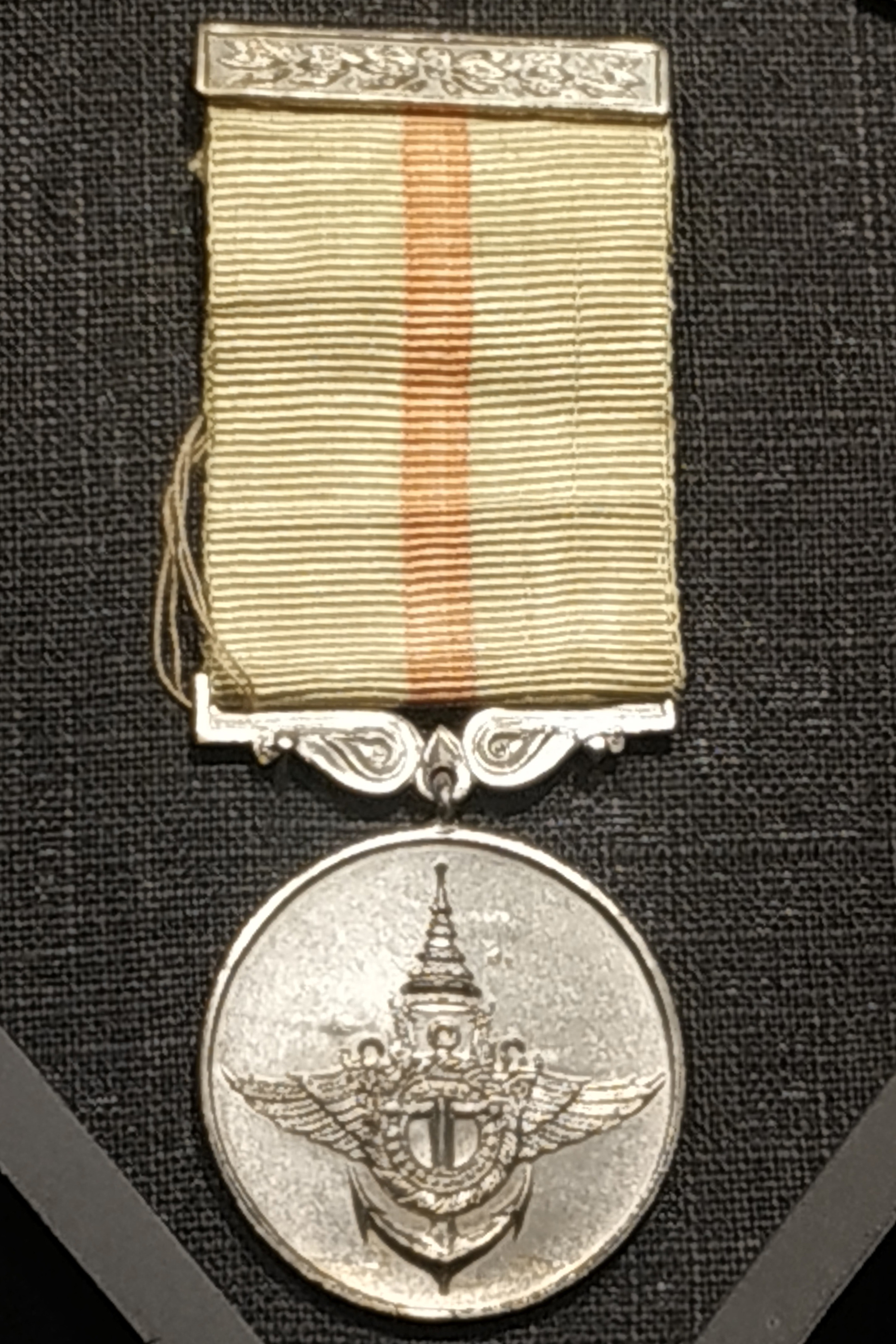
Medal for Service Rendered in the Interior (Greater East Asia War)

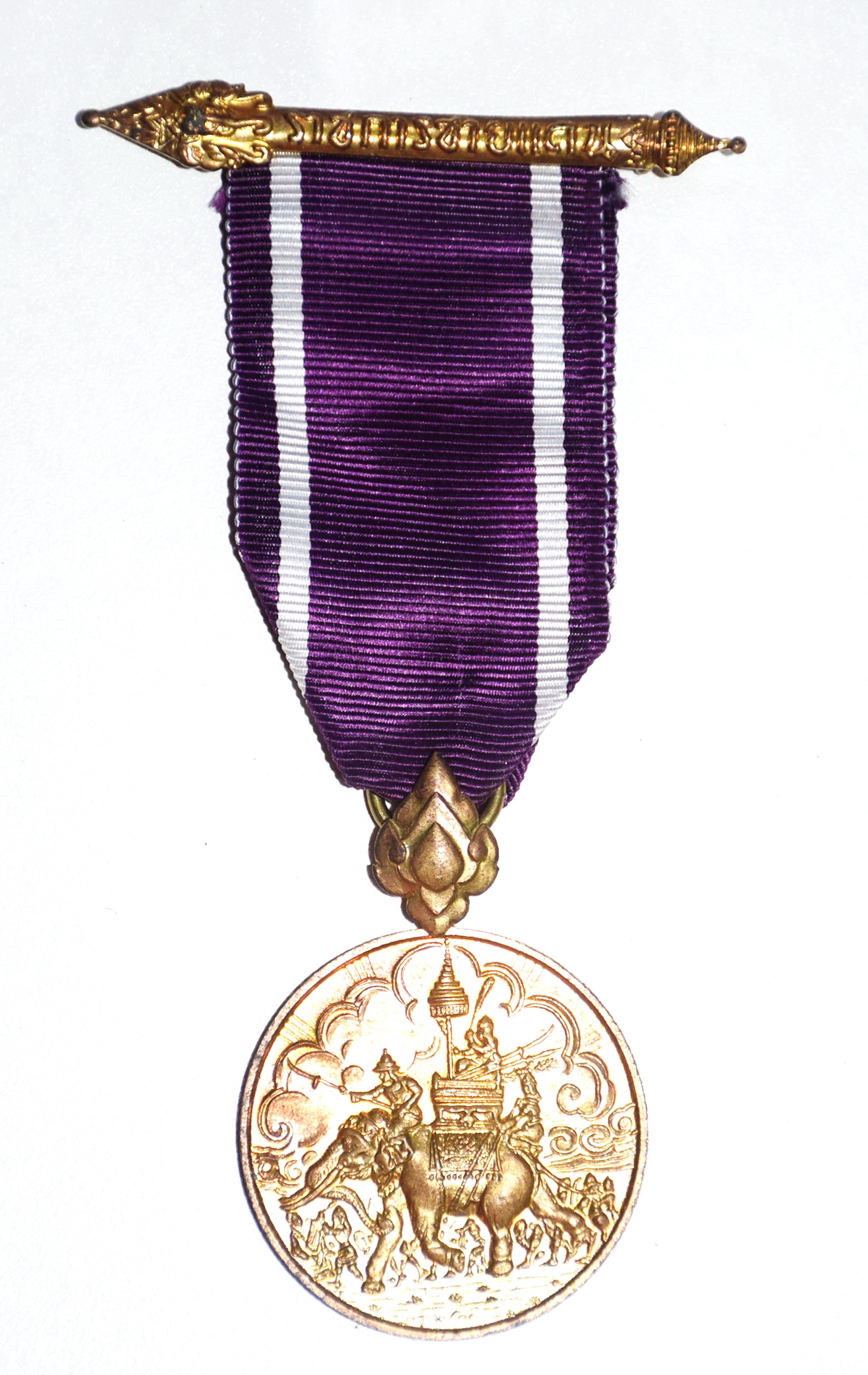
Border Service Medal

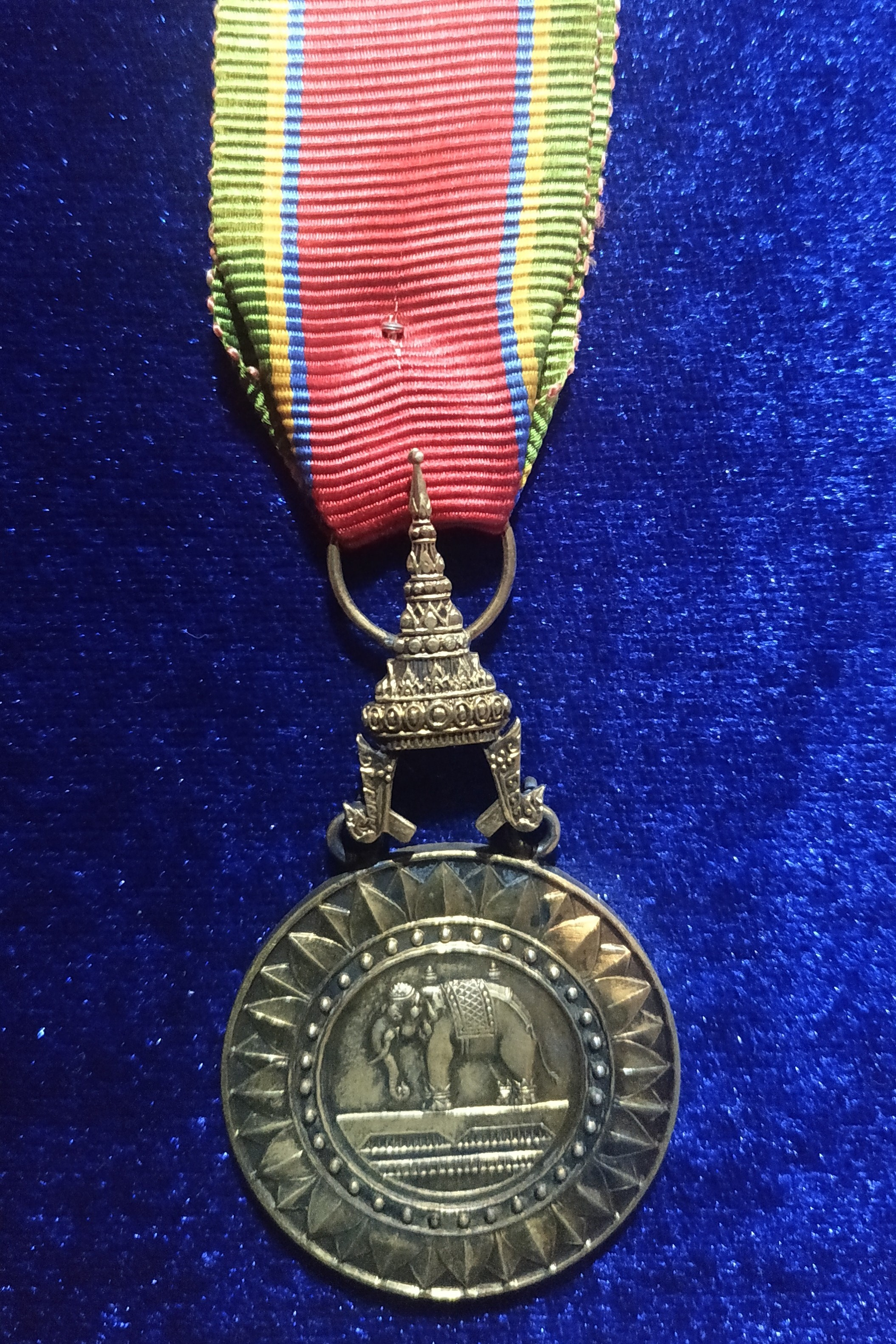
Gold Medal (Sixth Class) of the Most Exalted Order of the White Elephant

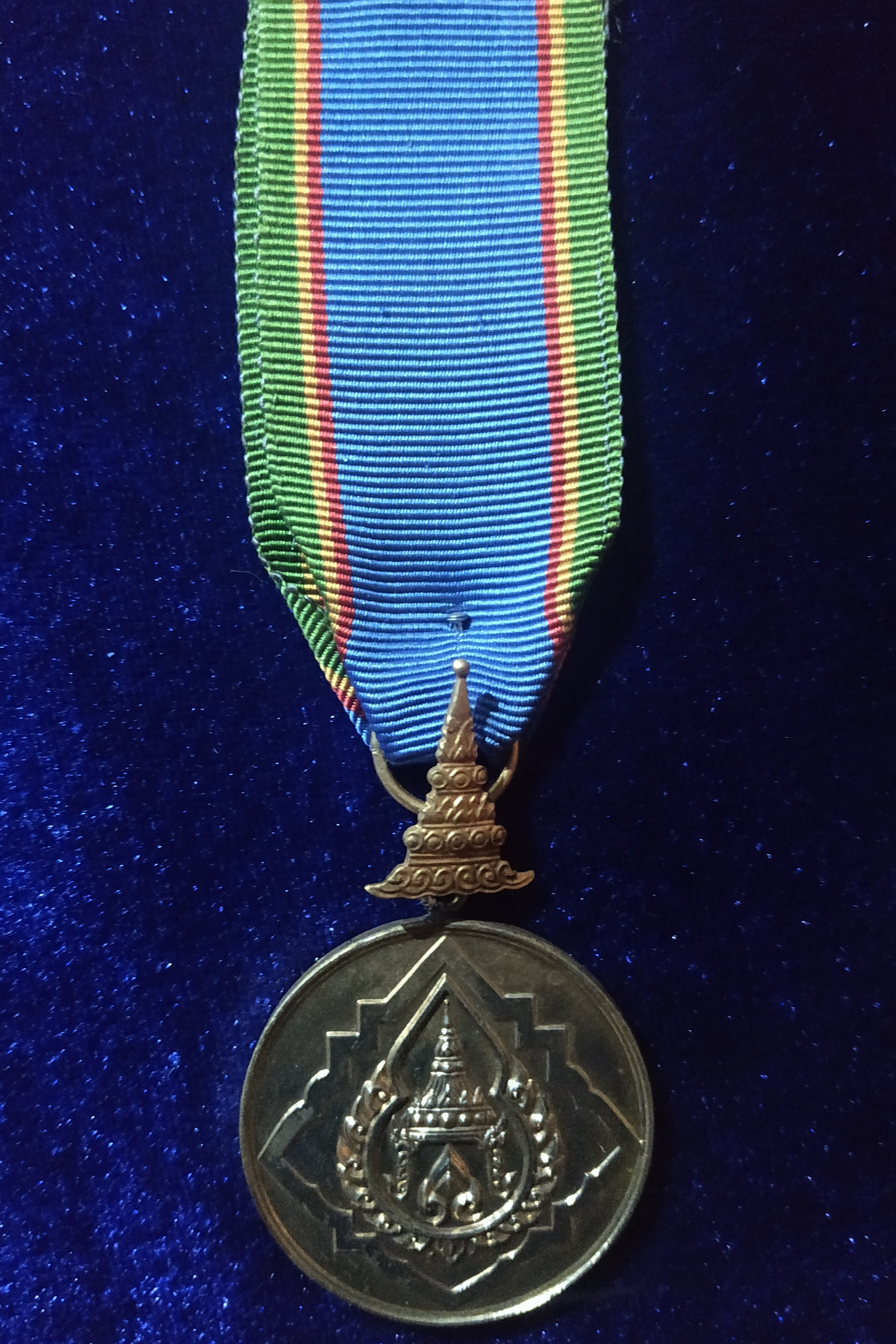
Silver Medal (Seventh Class) of the Most Noble Order of the Crown of Thailand

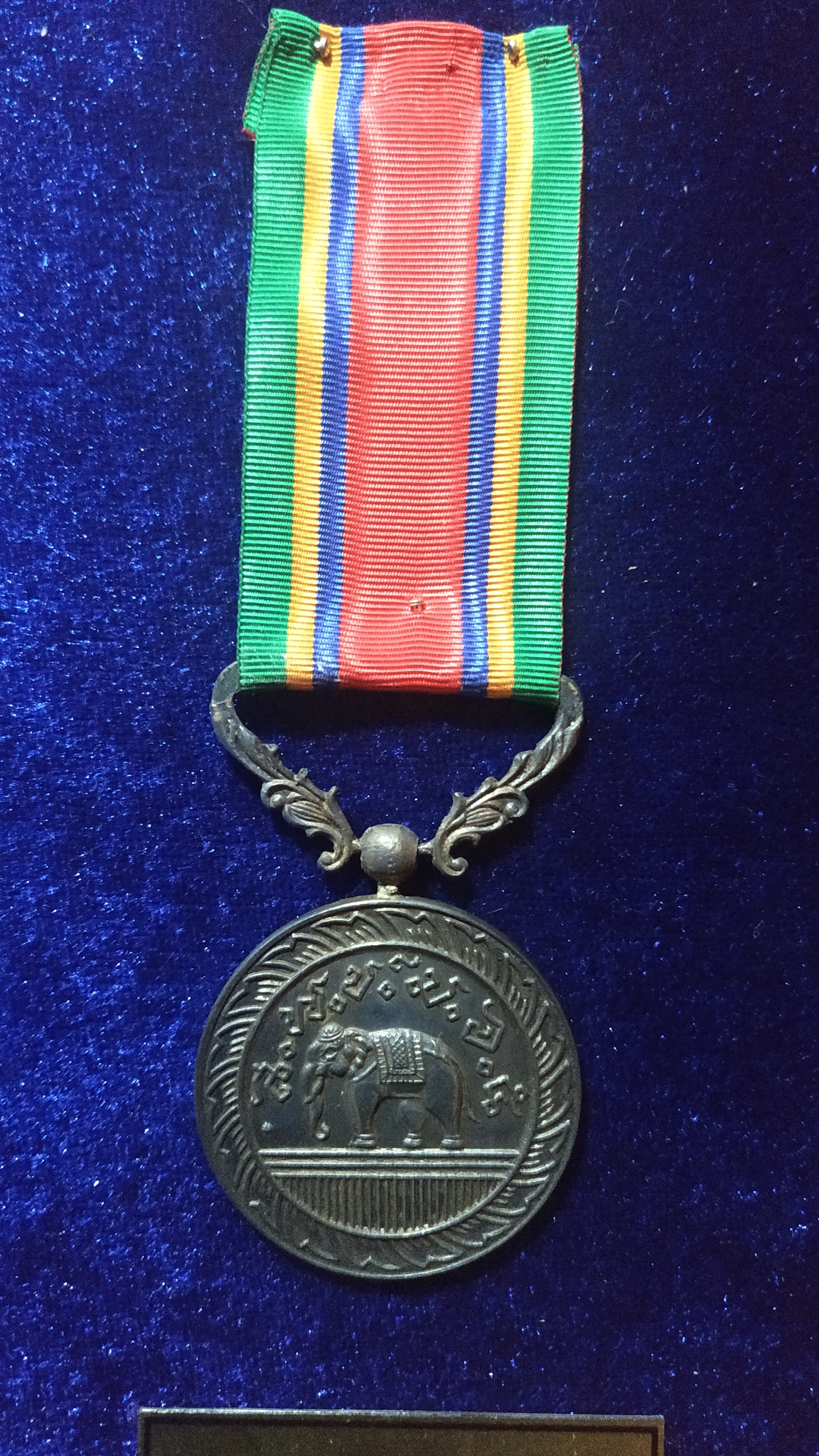
Chakra Mala Medal

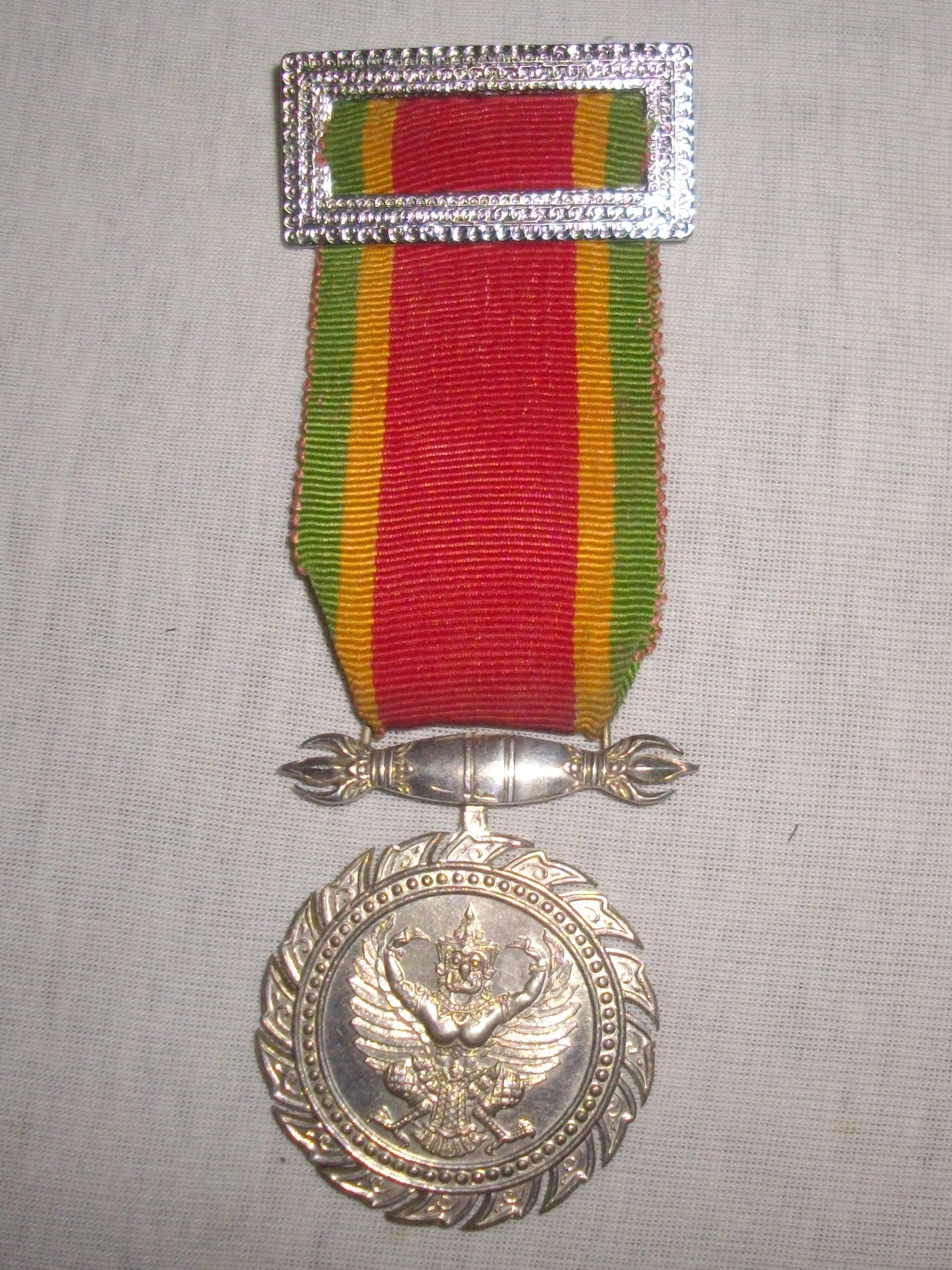
Chakrabarti Mala Medal

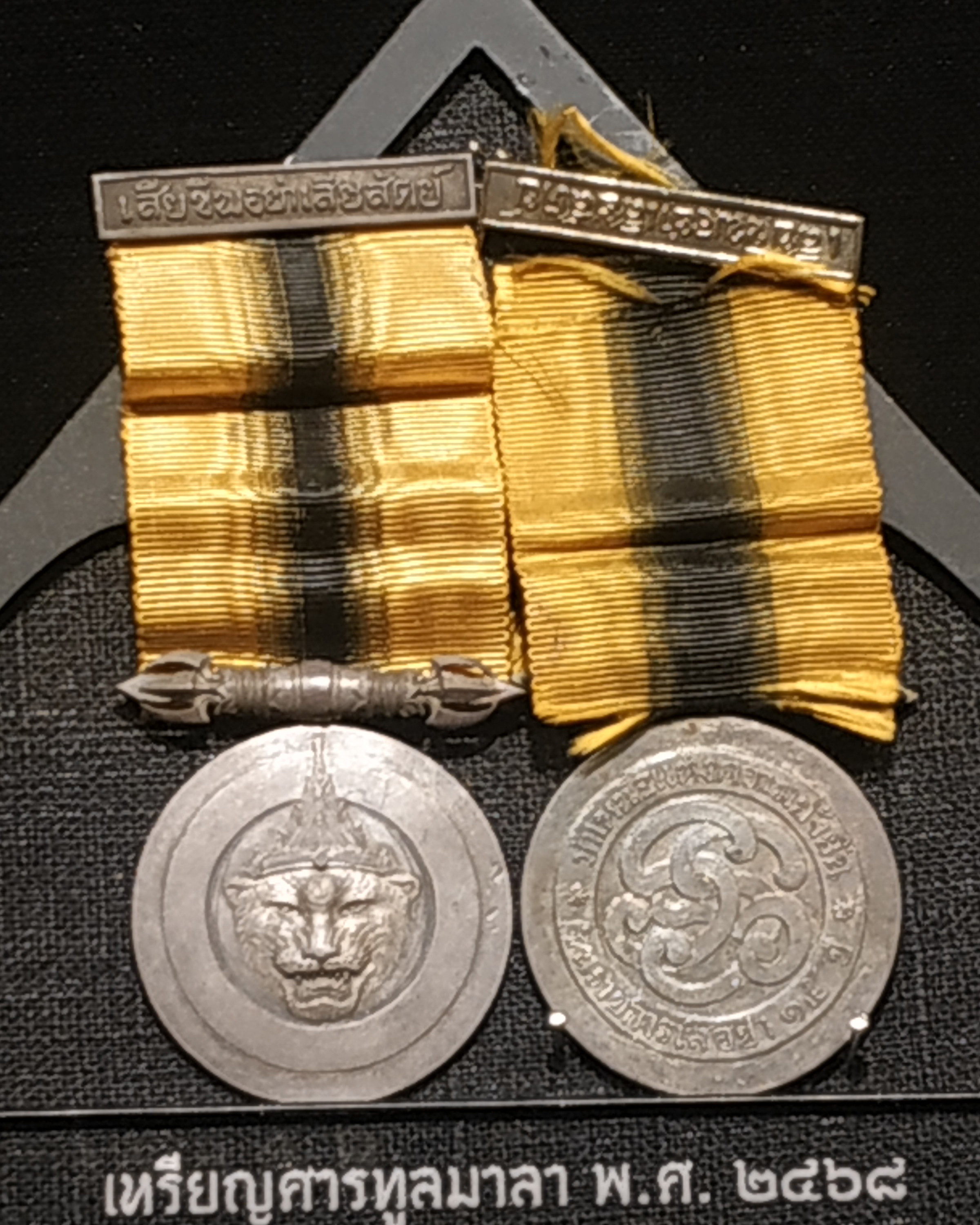
Saradul Mala Medal of the Wild Tiger Corps

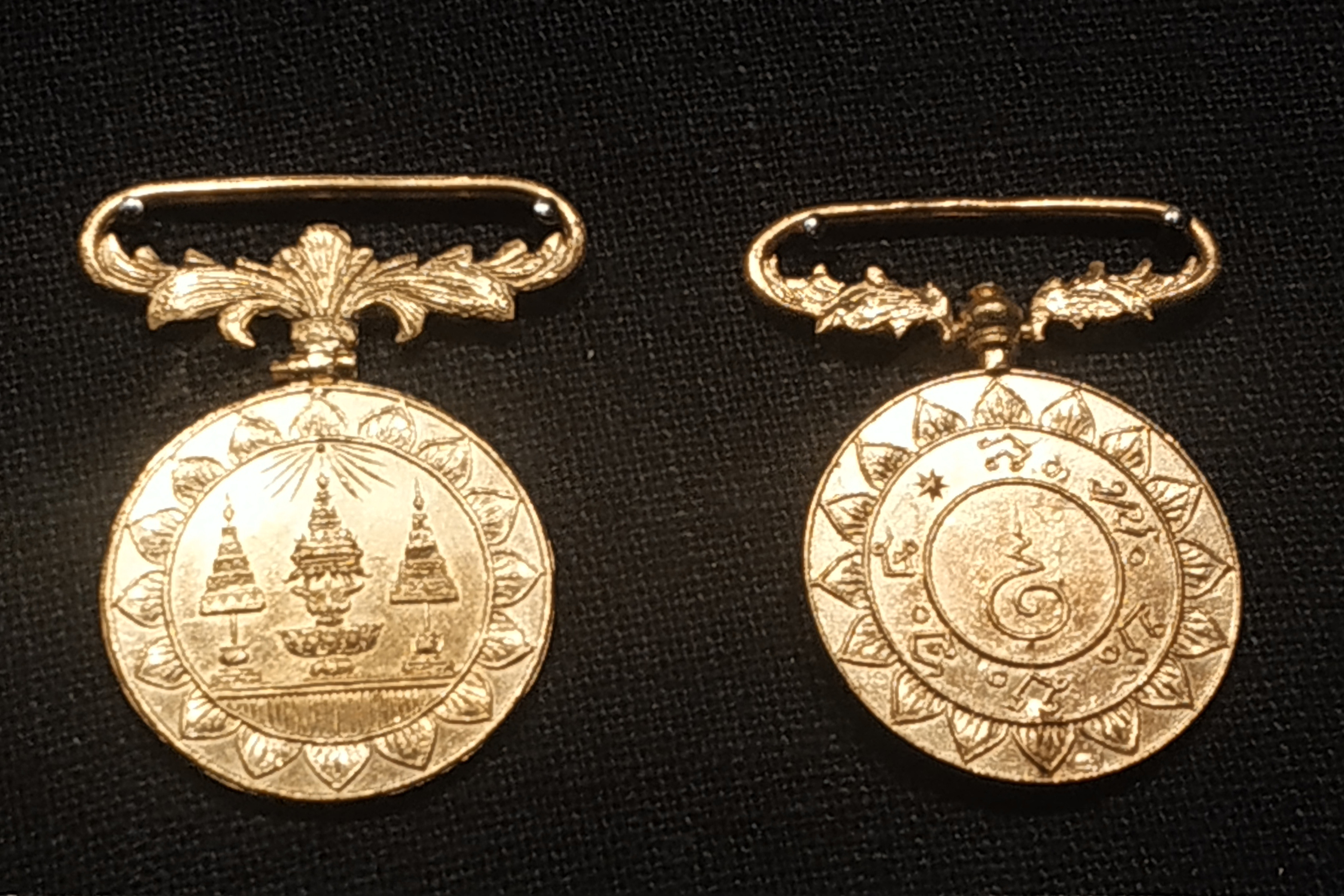
Pushpa Mala Medal

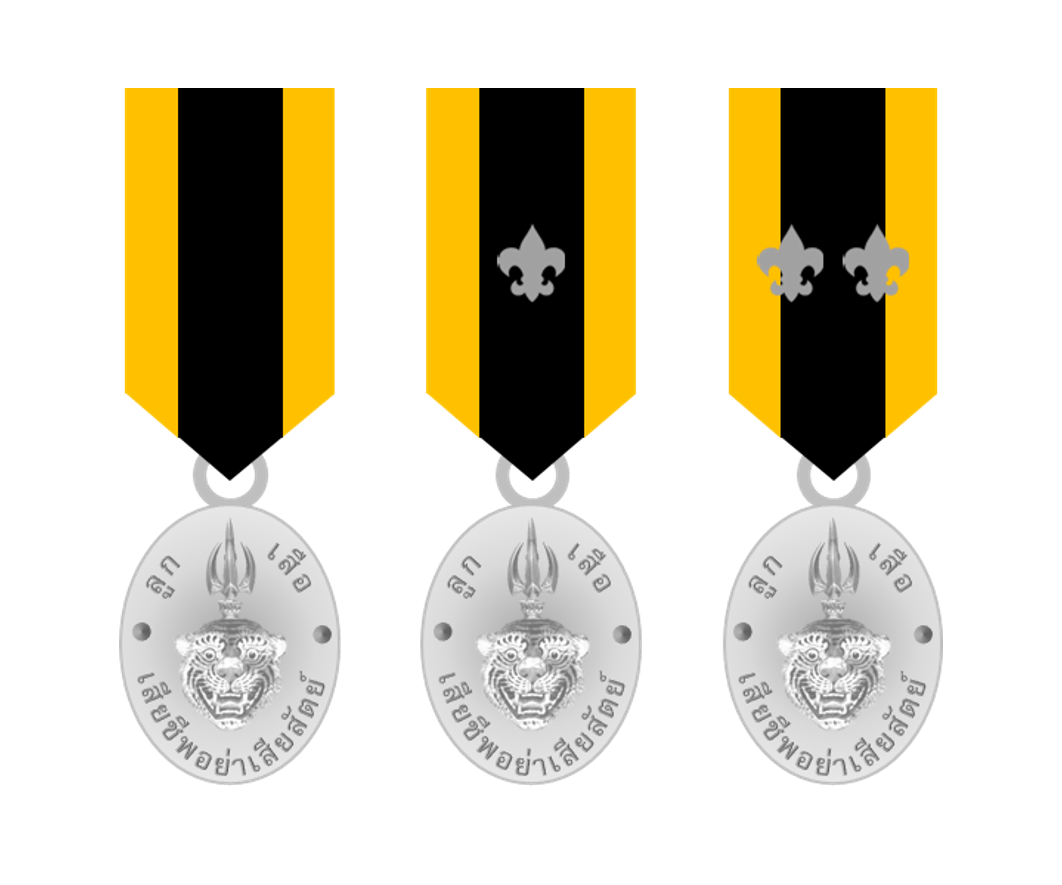
The Boy Scout Commendation Medals

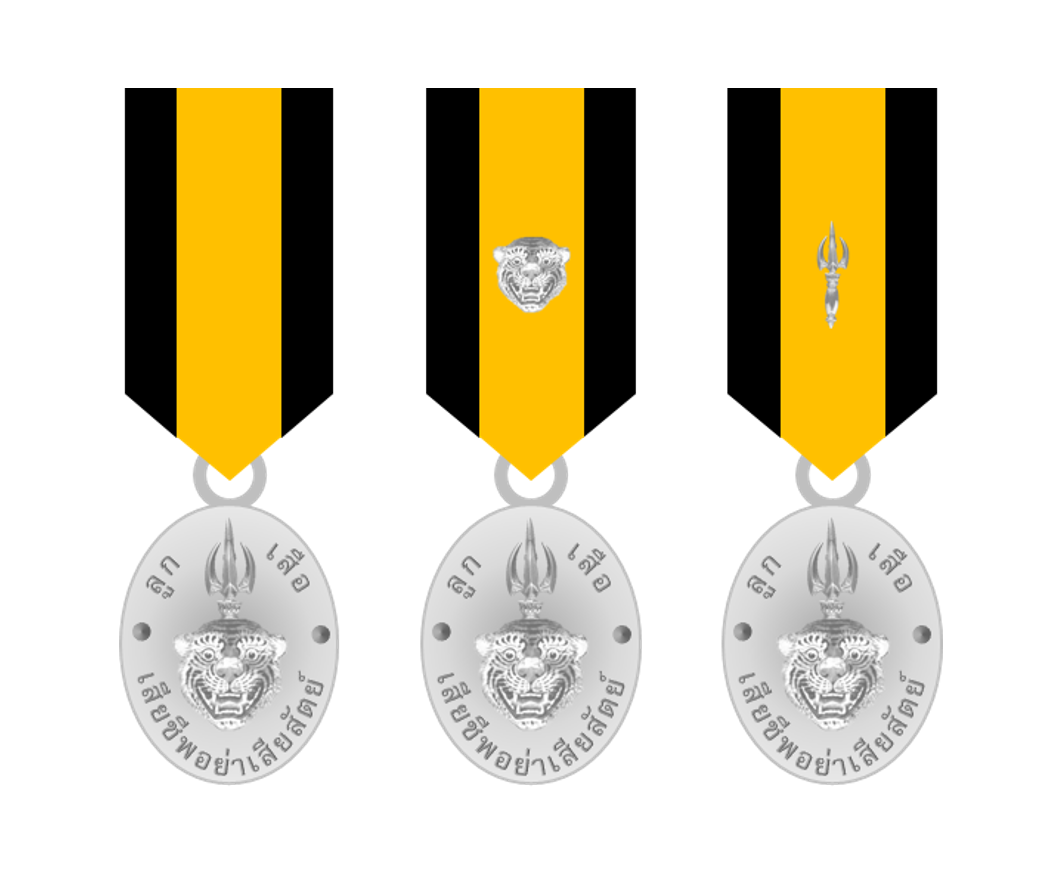
The Boy Scout Citation Medals

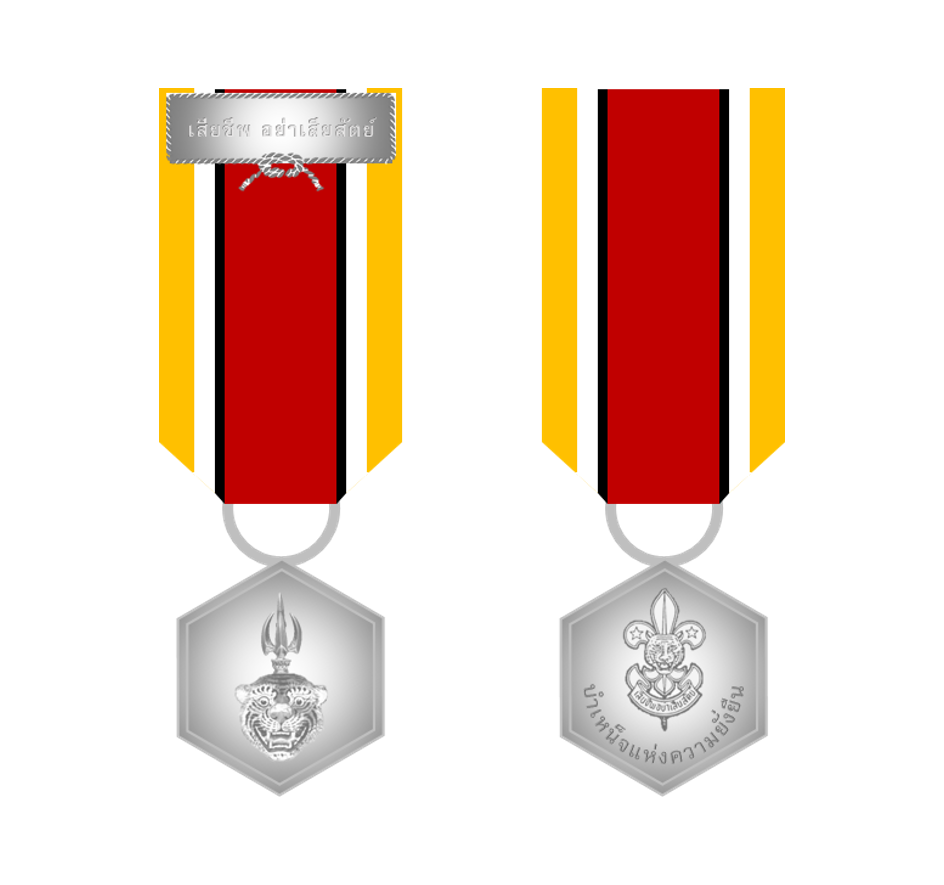
The Sustainable Scout Medal

=== Medals for commemorative occasions ===
Ribbon	Honour	Post-nominal letters
	Satabarsa Mala, Commemorative Medal on the Occasion of the Rattanakosin Centennial Celebration	SM
	Rachada Bhisek, Commemorative Medal on the Occasion of the Silver Jubilee Celebrations of King Chulalongkorn's Reign	RS
	Prabas Mala, Commemorative Medal of the Royal State Visits to Europe of King Chulalongkorn	RPM
	Rajini Medal, Commemorative Medal of Queen Saovabha Phongsri's Investiture as Queen Regnant	SP
	Dvidha Bhisek Medal, Commemorative Medal on the Occasion of the Accession to the Throne of King Chulalongkorn as Two Times of King King Phra Phutthaloetla Naphalai's Reign	DS
	Rajamangala Medal, Commemorative Medal on the Occasion of the Accession to the Throne of King Chulalongkorn as King Ramathibodi II's Reign	RRM
	Rajamangala Bhisek Medal, Commemorative Medal on the Occasion of the Longest Reign Celebrations of the Accession to the Throne of King Chulalongkorn	RMS
	King Rama VI Coronation Medal	RRS6
	King Rama VII Coronation Medal	RRS7
	Chai Medal	—
	Commemorative Medal on the Occasion of the 150th Years of Rattanakosin Celebration	RChPh
	King Rama IX Coronation Medal	RRS9
	25th Buddhist Century Celebration Medal	—
	Commemorative Medal of the Royal State Visits to the United States of America and Europe of King Bhumibol Adulyadej	—
	Rachada Bhisek, Commemorative Medal on the Occasion of the Silver Jubilee Celebrations of King Bhumibol Adulyadej's Reign	—
	Commemorative Medal of Maha Vajiralongkorn's Investiture as Crown Prince	—
	Serving Free People Medal	SSCh
	Commemorative Medal on the Occasion of the Elevation of Princess Sirindhorn Debaratanasuda to the title of "H.R.H. Princess Maha Chakri Sirindhorn"	—
	Commemorative Medal on the Occasion of the Rattanakosin Bicentennial Celebration	—
	Commemorative Medal on the Occasion of the 50th Birthday Anniversary of Queen Sirikit	—
	Commemorative Medal on the Occasion of the 84th Birthday Anniversary of Somdej Phra Srinagarindra Boromarajajonani	—
	Commemorative Medal on the Occasion of the 60th Birthday Anniversary of King Bhumibol Adulyadej	—
	Commemorative Medal on the Occasion of the Longest Reign Celebrations of the Accession to the Throne of King Bhumibol Adulyadej	—
	Commemorative Medal on the Occasion of the 60th Birthday Anniversary of Queen Sirikit	—
	Commemorative Medal on the Occasion of the Golden Jubilee Celebrations of King Bhumibol Adulyadej's Reign	—
	Commemorative Medal on the Occasion of the 6th Cycle Birthday Anniversary of King Bhumibol Adulyadej	—
	Commemorative Medal on the Occasion of the 72nd Birthday Anniversary of Queen Sirikit	—
	Commemorative Medal on the Occasion of the 60th Anniversary of the Accession to the Throne of King Bhumibol Adulyadej	—
	Commemorative Medal on the Occasion of the 7th Cycle Birthday Anniversary of King Bhumibol Adulyadej	—
	Commemorative Medal on the Occasion of the 60th Birthday Anniversary of Prince Maha Vajiralongkorn	—
	Commemorative Medal on the Occasion of the 60th Birthday Anniversary of Princess Maha Chakri Sirindhorn	—
	Commemorative Medal on the Occasion of the 84th Birthday Anniversary of Queen Sirikit]	—
	King Rama X Coronation Medal	—
	Commemorative Medal on the Occasion of the Investiture of Queen Suthida	—
	Commemorative Medal on the Occasion of the 90th Birthday Anniversary of Queen Sirikit	—
	Commemorative Medal on the Occasion of the 72nd Birthday Anniversary of King Vajiralongkorn	—

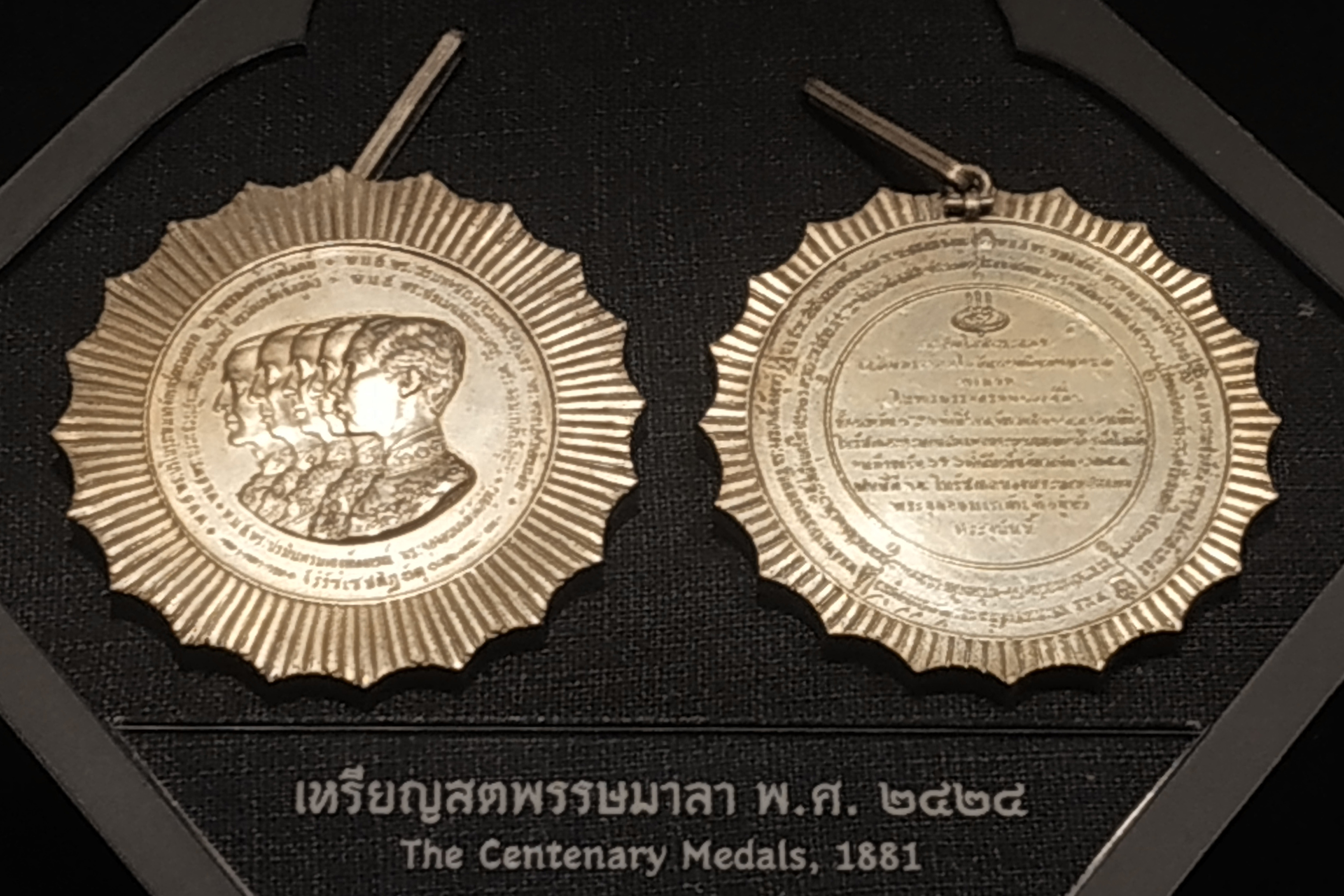
Satabarsa Mala Medal, 1892

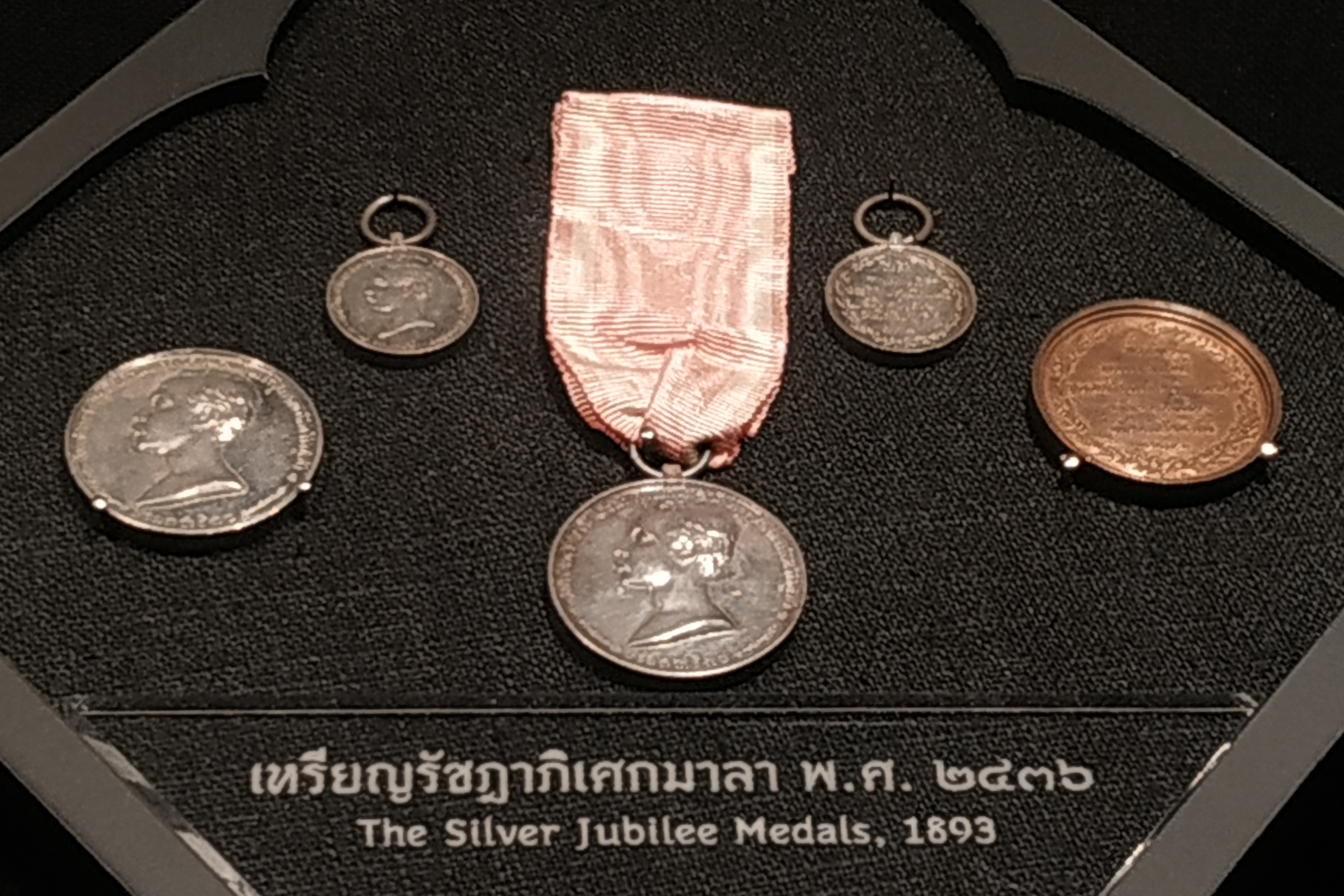
"Rajadabhisek Mala Medal" or King Chulalongkorn's Silver Jubilee Medal, 1893

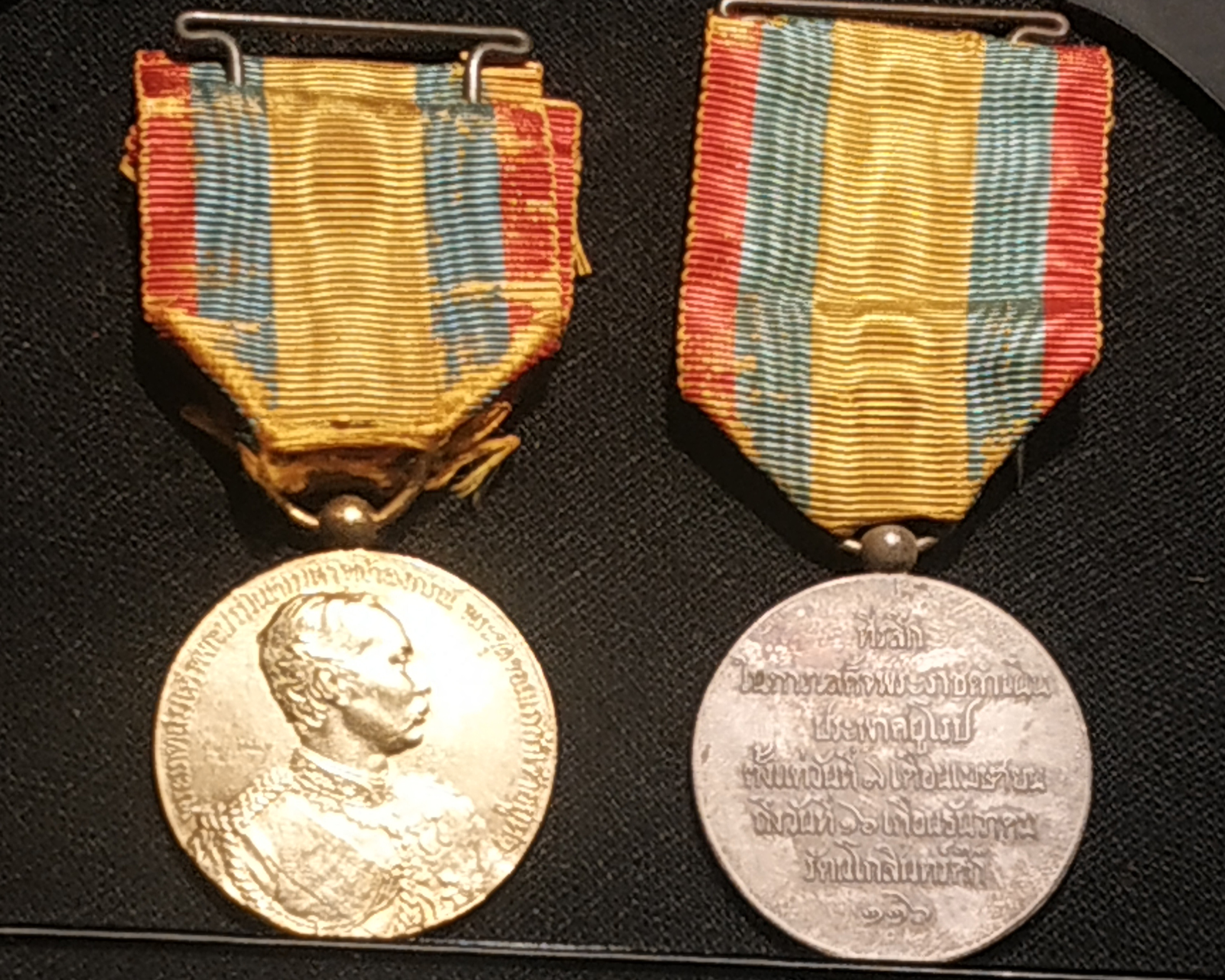
Prabas Mala Medal, 1897

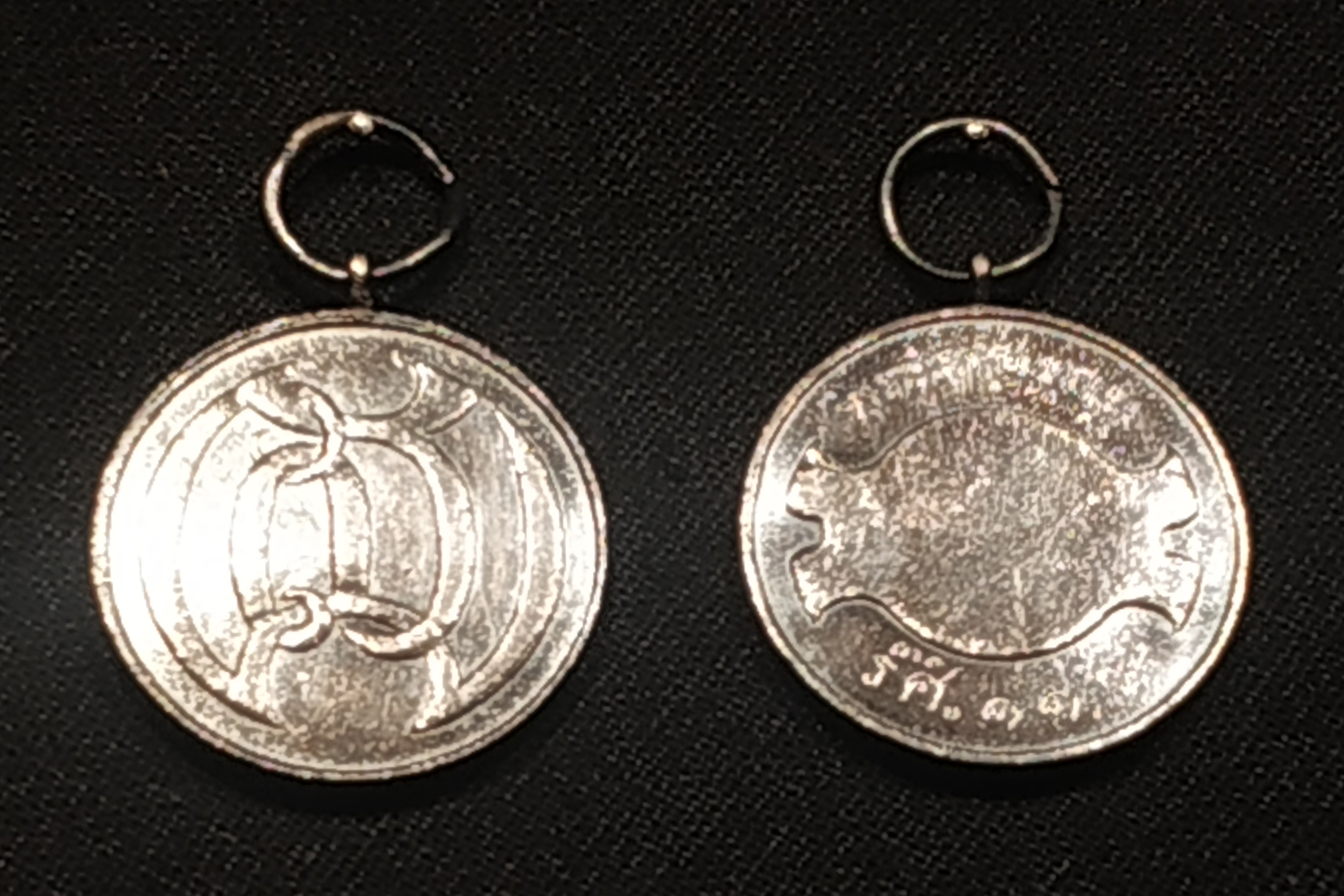
"Rajini Medal" or Queen Saovabha Bongsri's Medal,1897

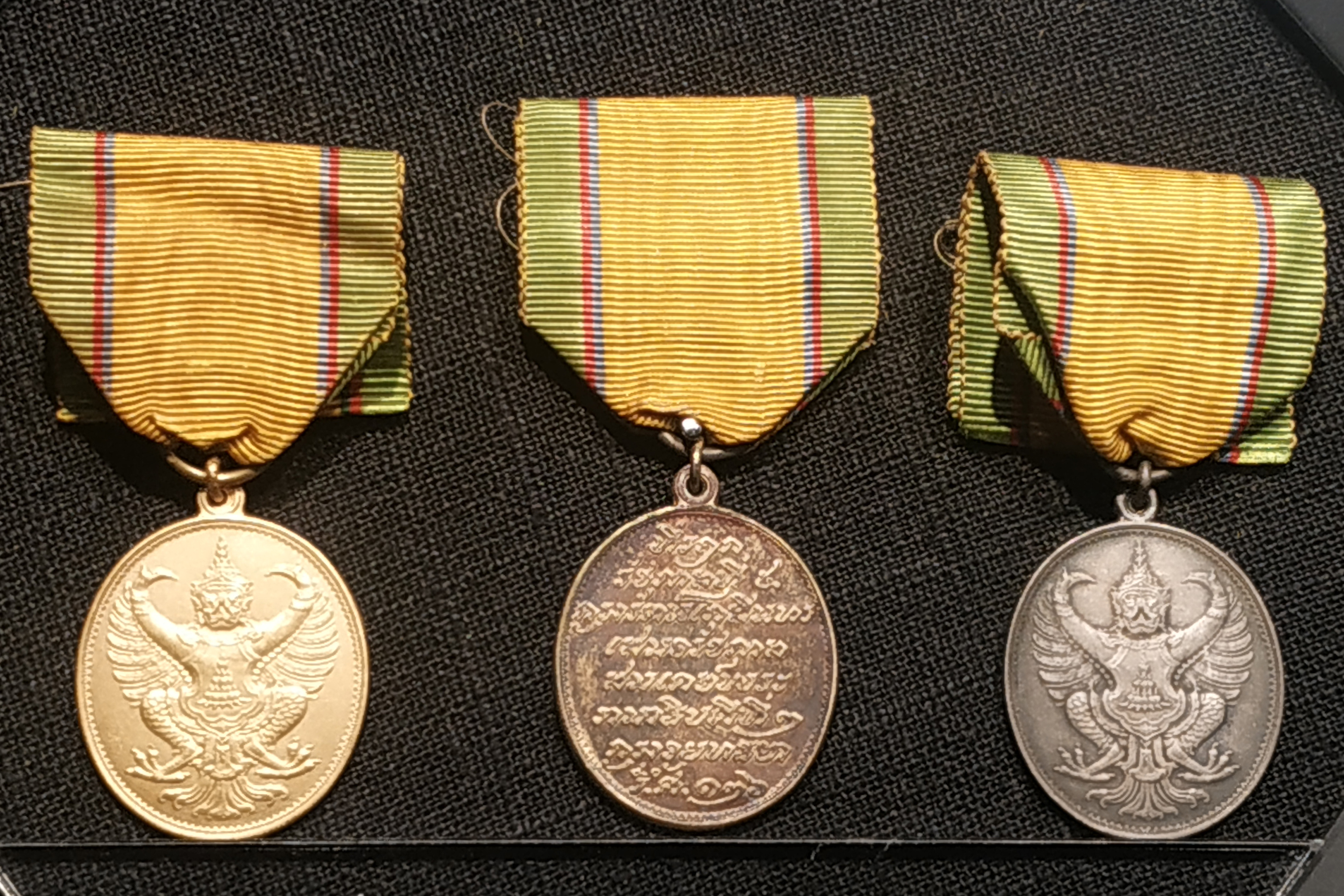
The Record Reign Medal, 1907

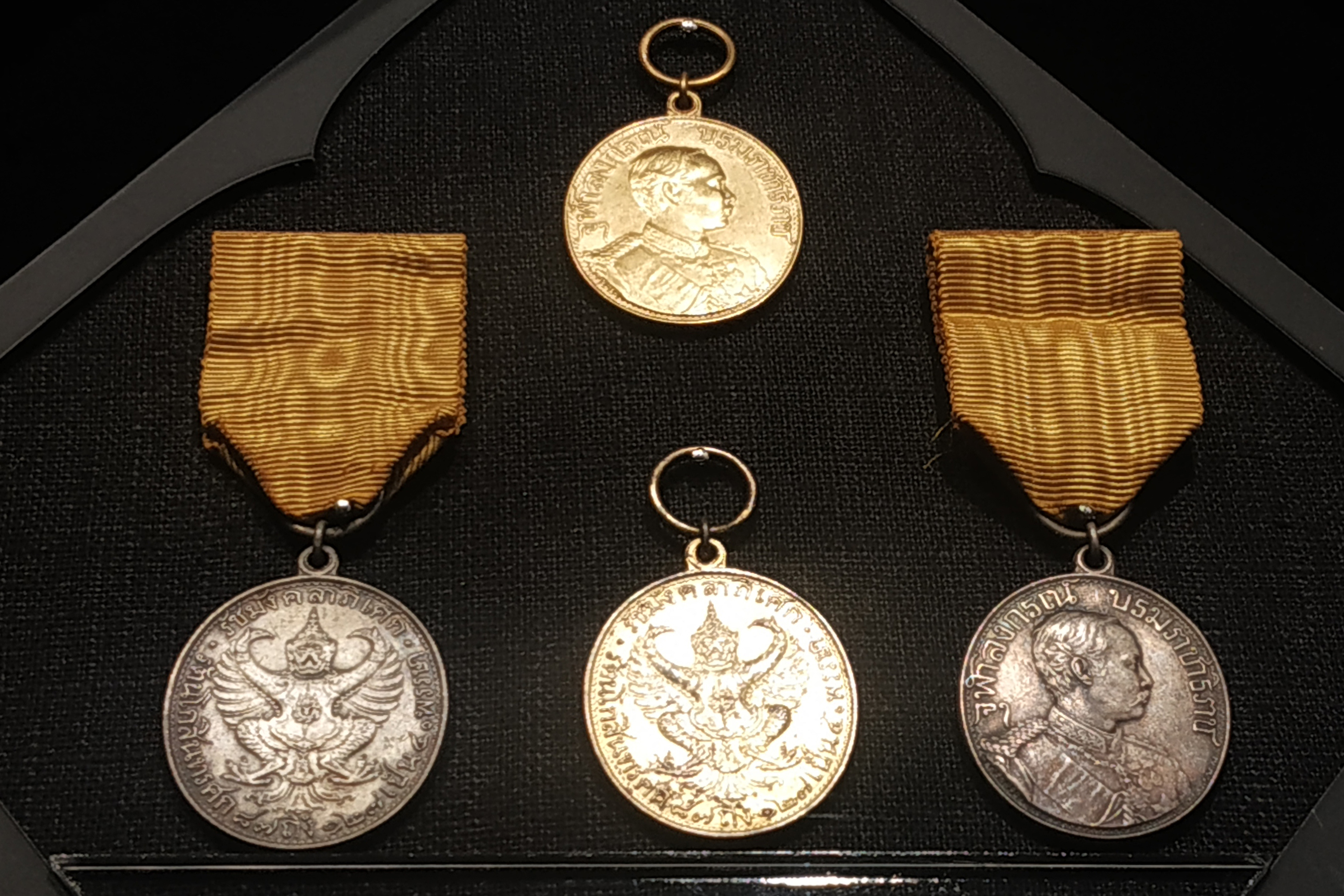
The Forty Years's Reign Medal or King Chulalongkorn's Rajjamangalabhishek Medal, 1908

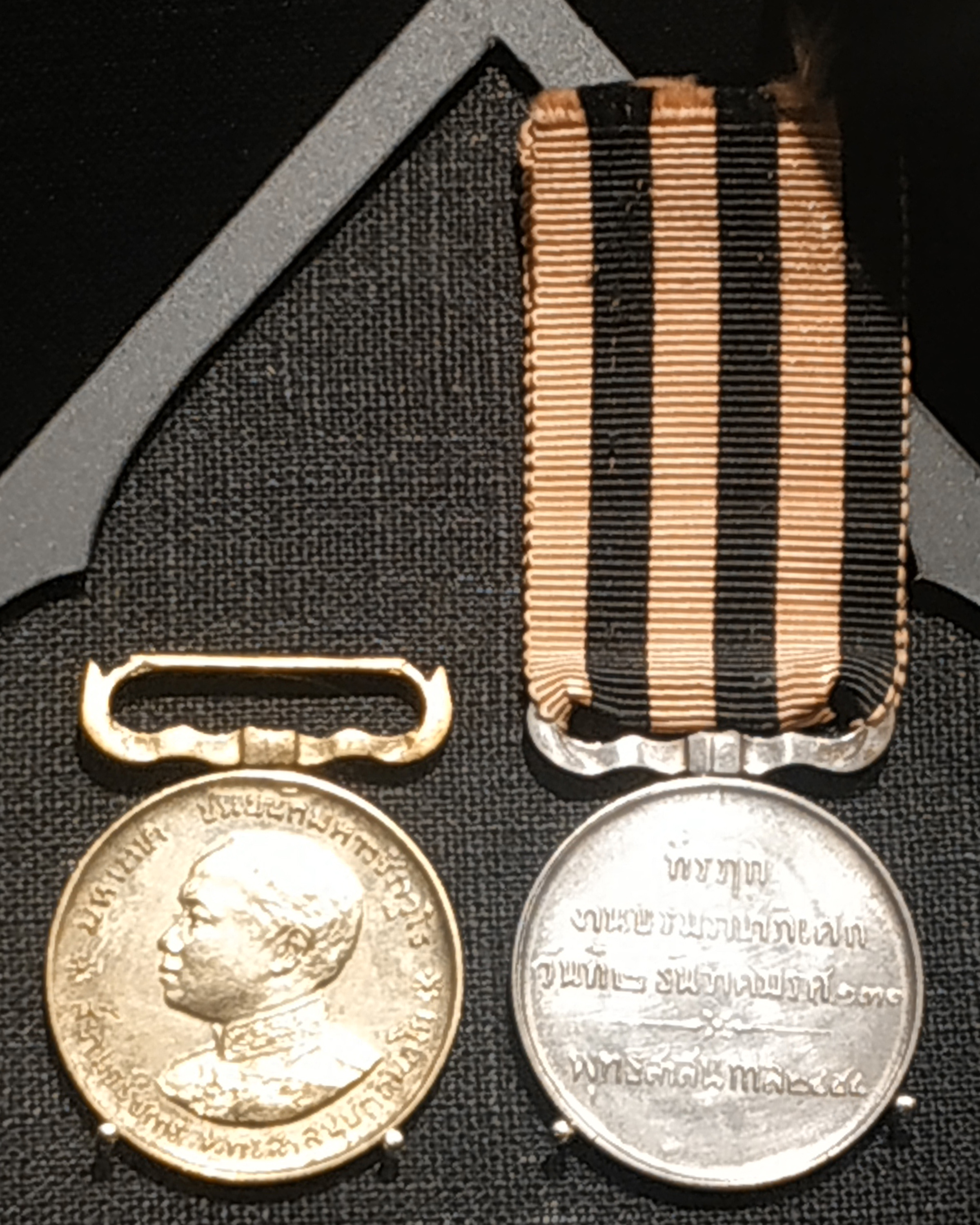
King Vajiravudh's Coronation Medal, 1911

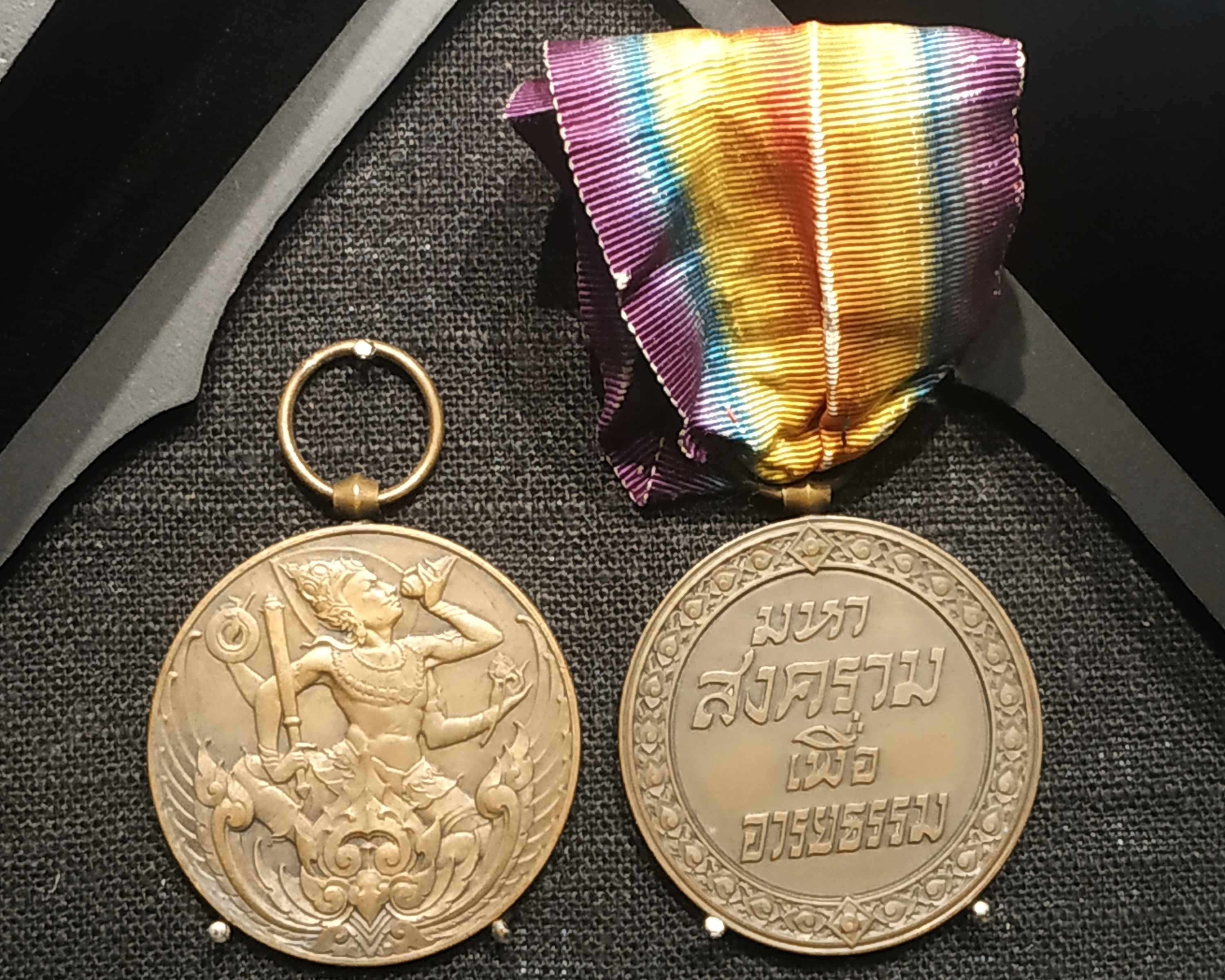
Chai Medal (Siamese Interallied Victory Medal of World War I), 1921

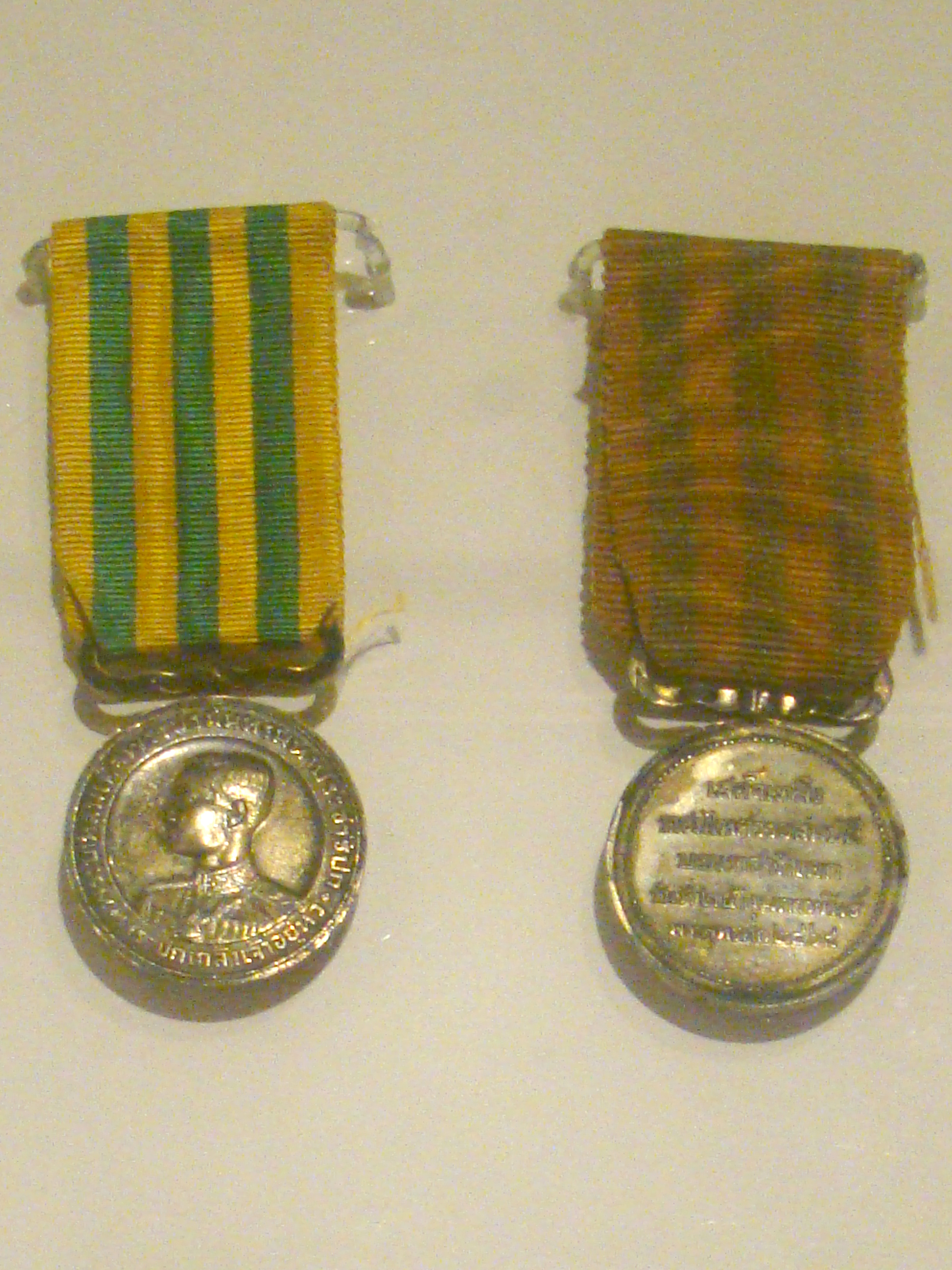
King Prajadhipok's Coronation Medal, 1926

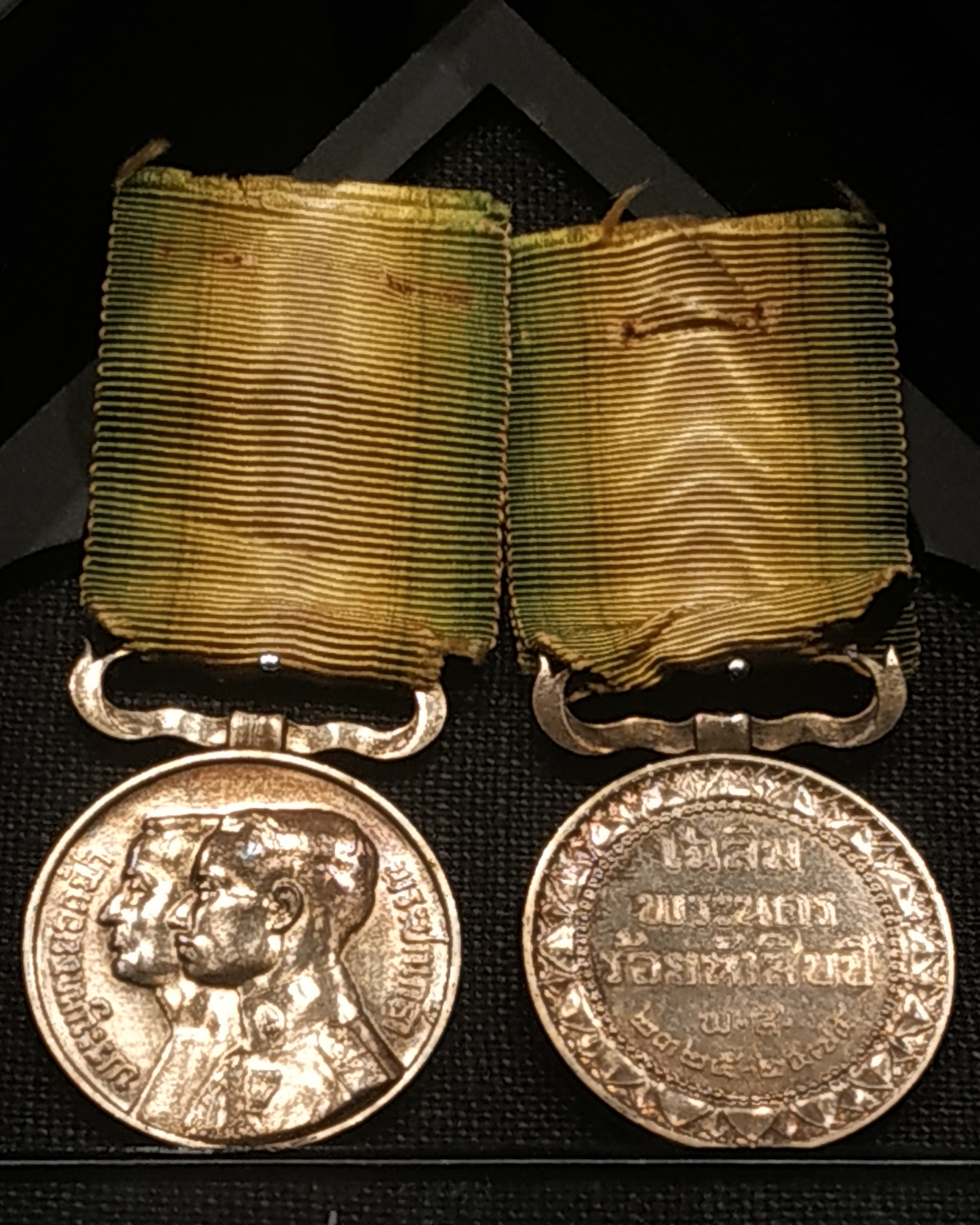
The 150 Years Commemoration of Bangkok Medal, 1932

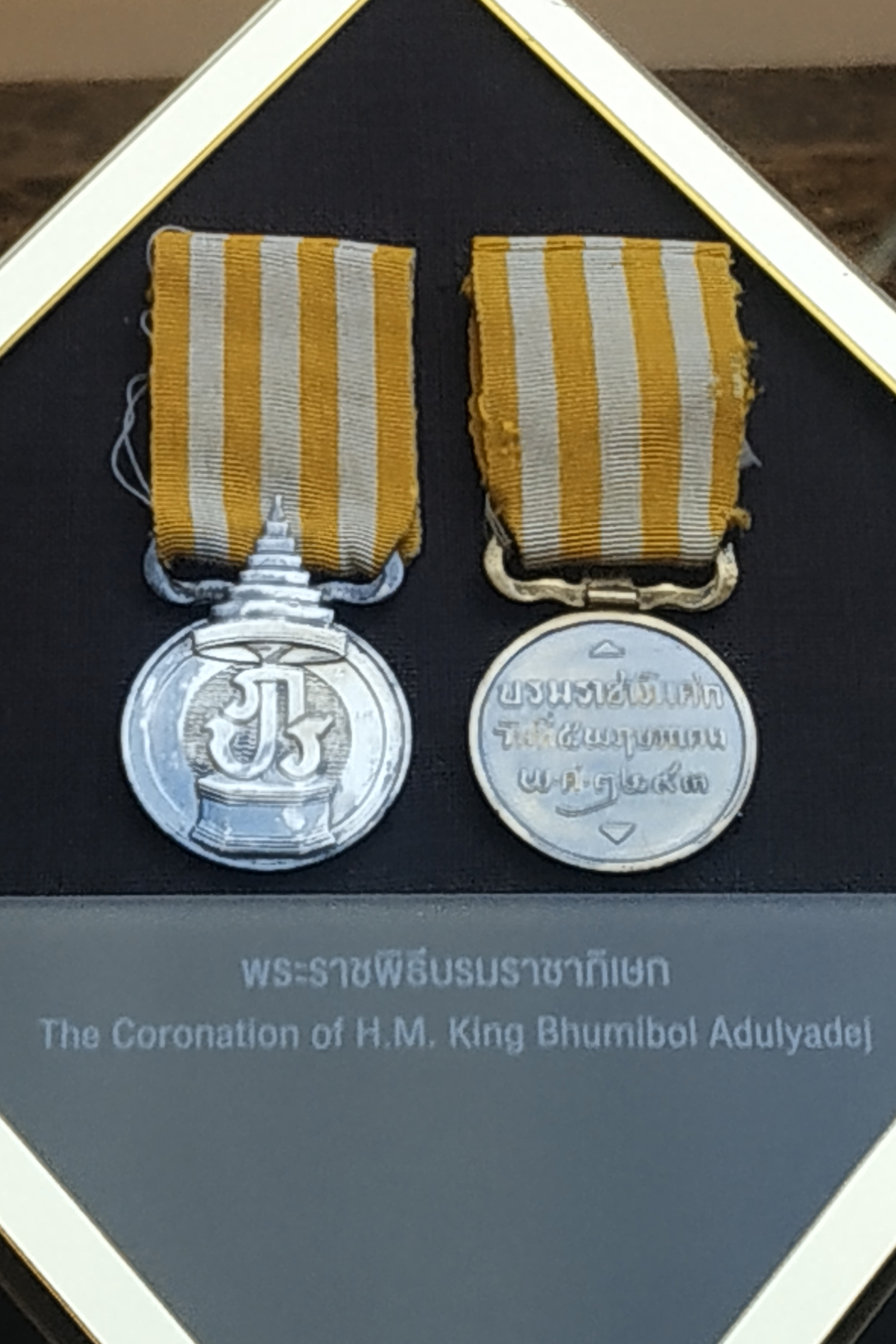
King Bhumibol Adulyadej's Coronation Medal, 1950

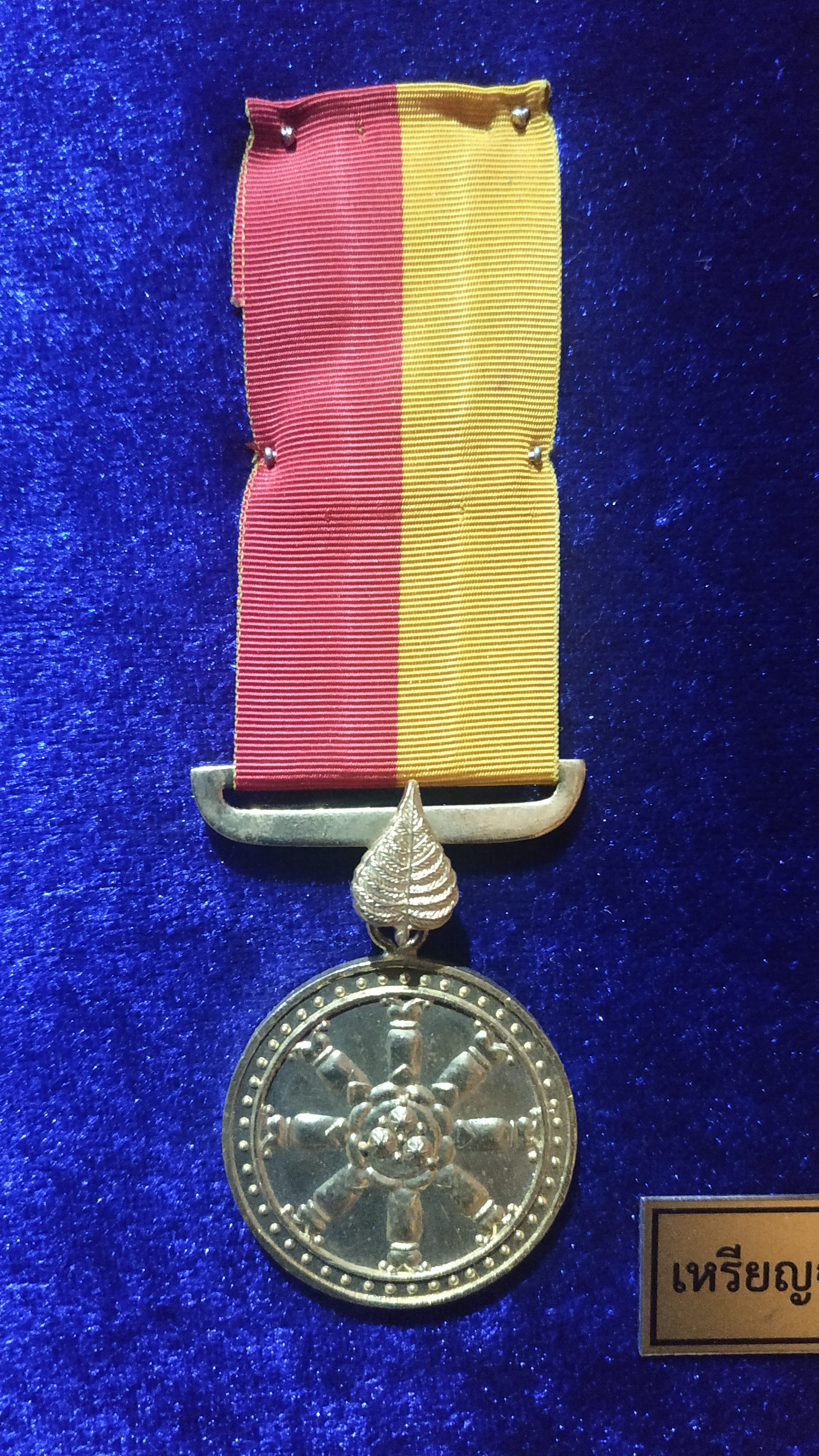
The 25th Buddhist Century Celebration Medal, 1957

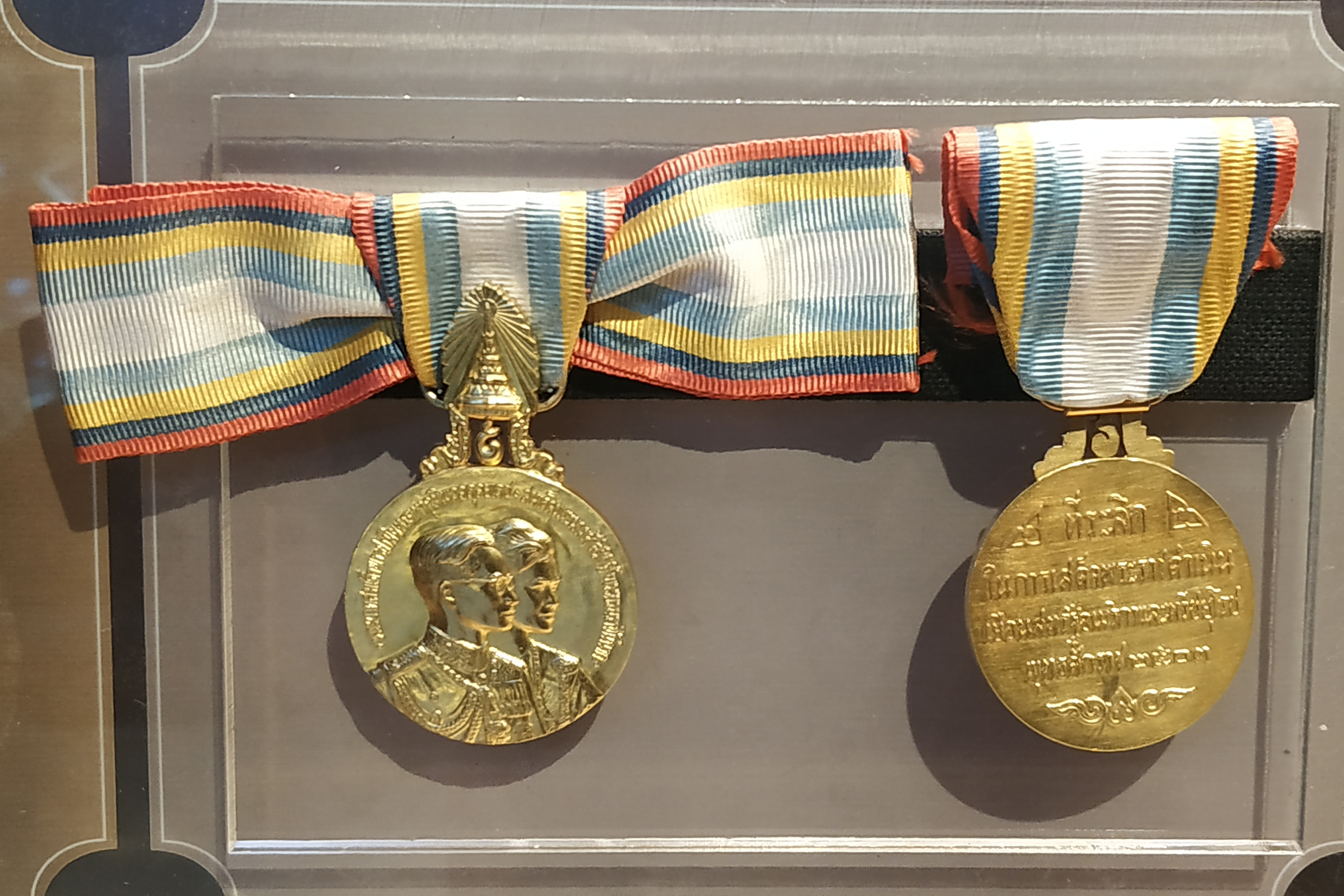
Medals of the Royal state visits to the US and Europe, 1961

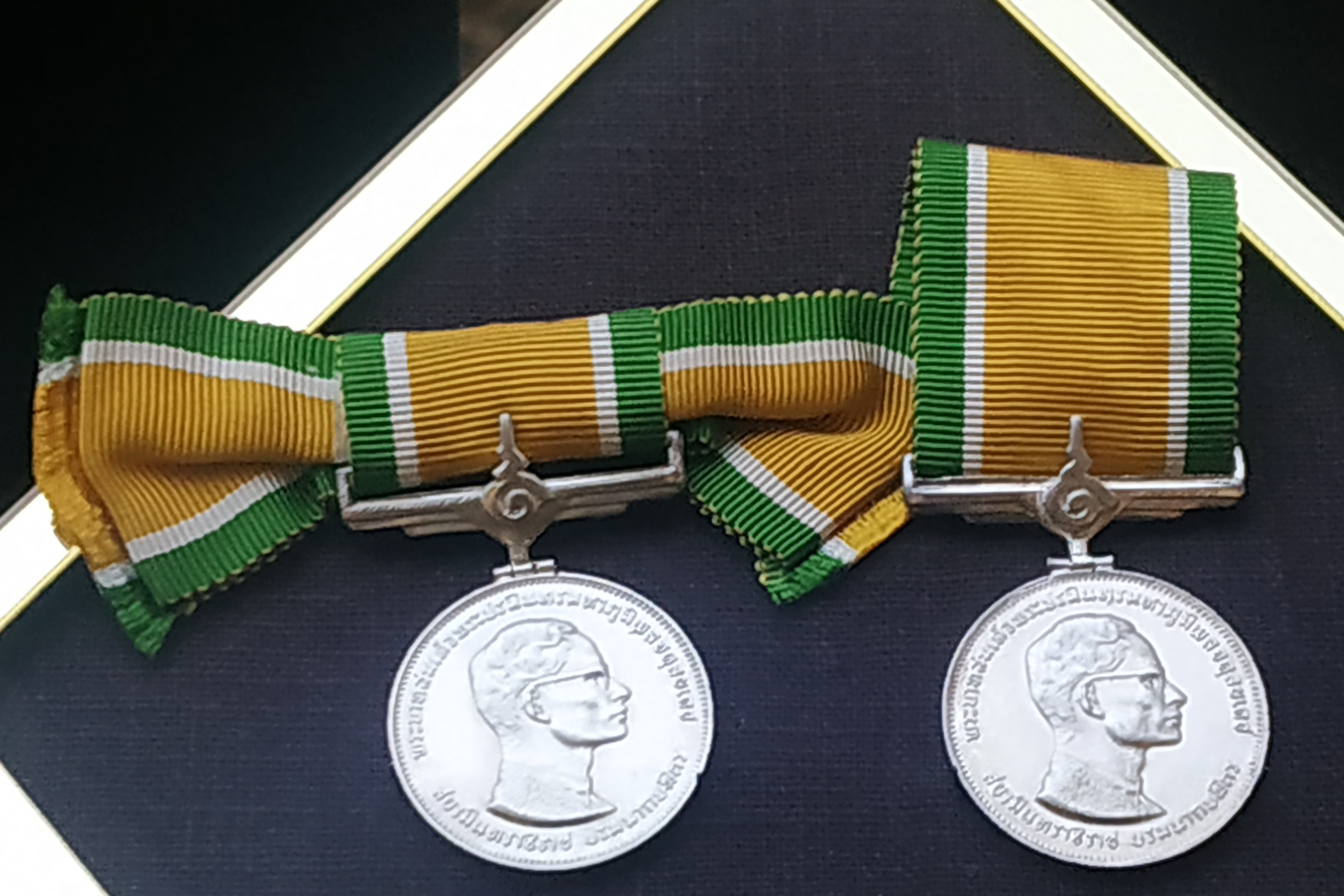
King Bhumibol Adulyadej's Silver Jubilee Medal, 1971

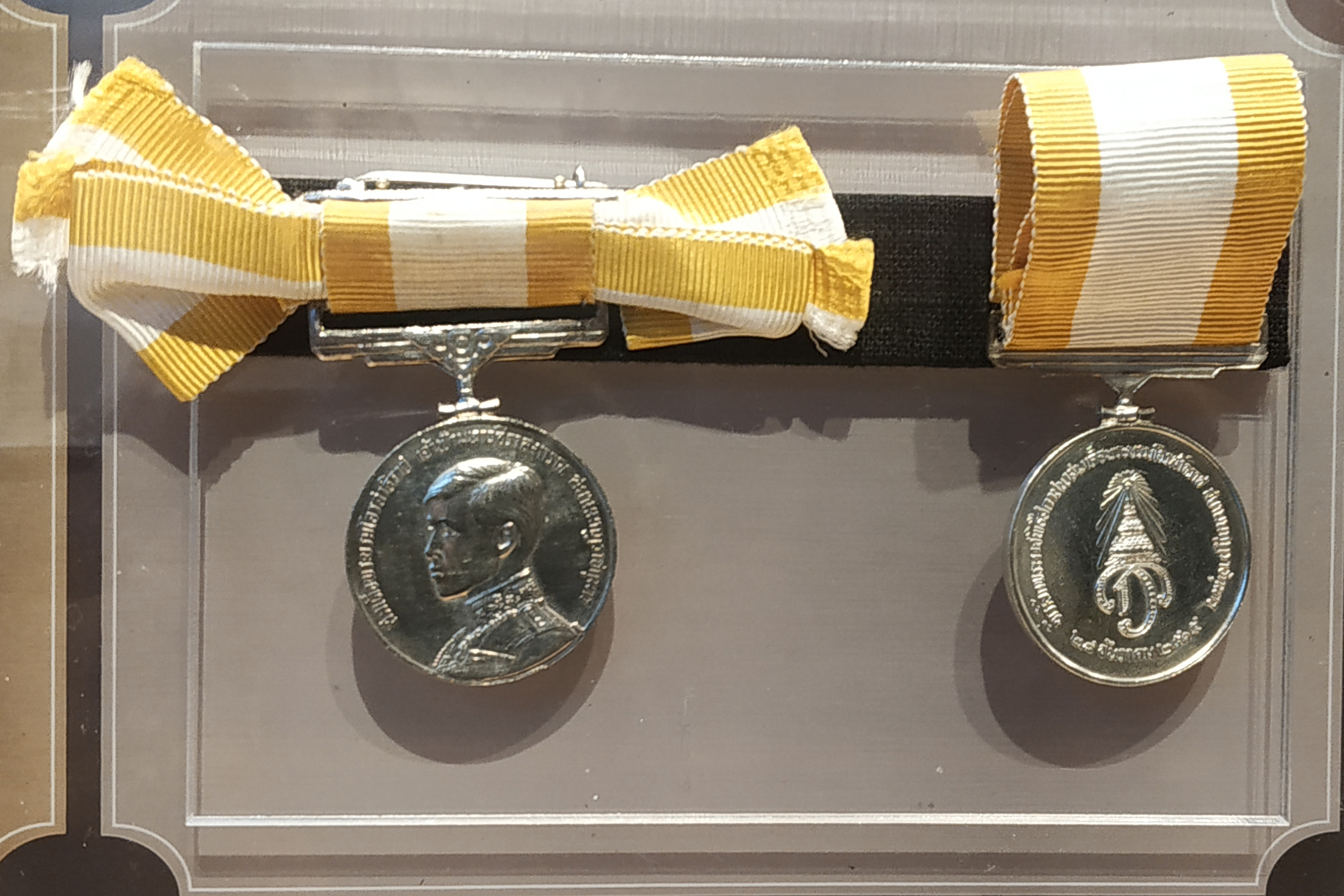
Medal on Occasion of the Investiture of Crown Prince Maha Vajiralongkorn, 1972

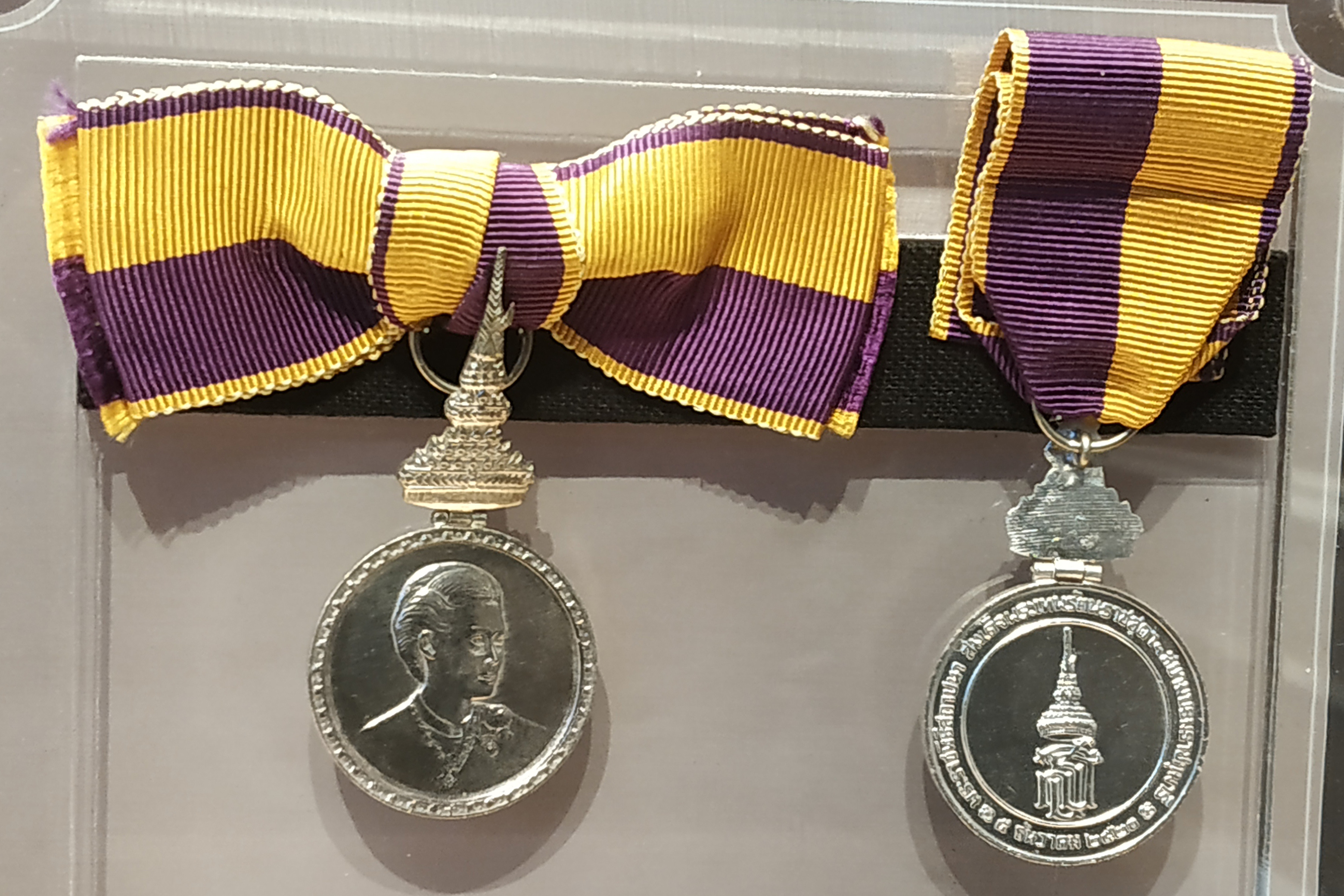
Medal on Occasion of the Investiture of Princess Maha Chakri Sirindhorn, 1977

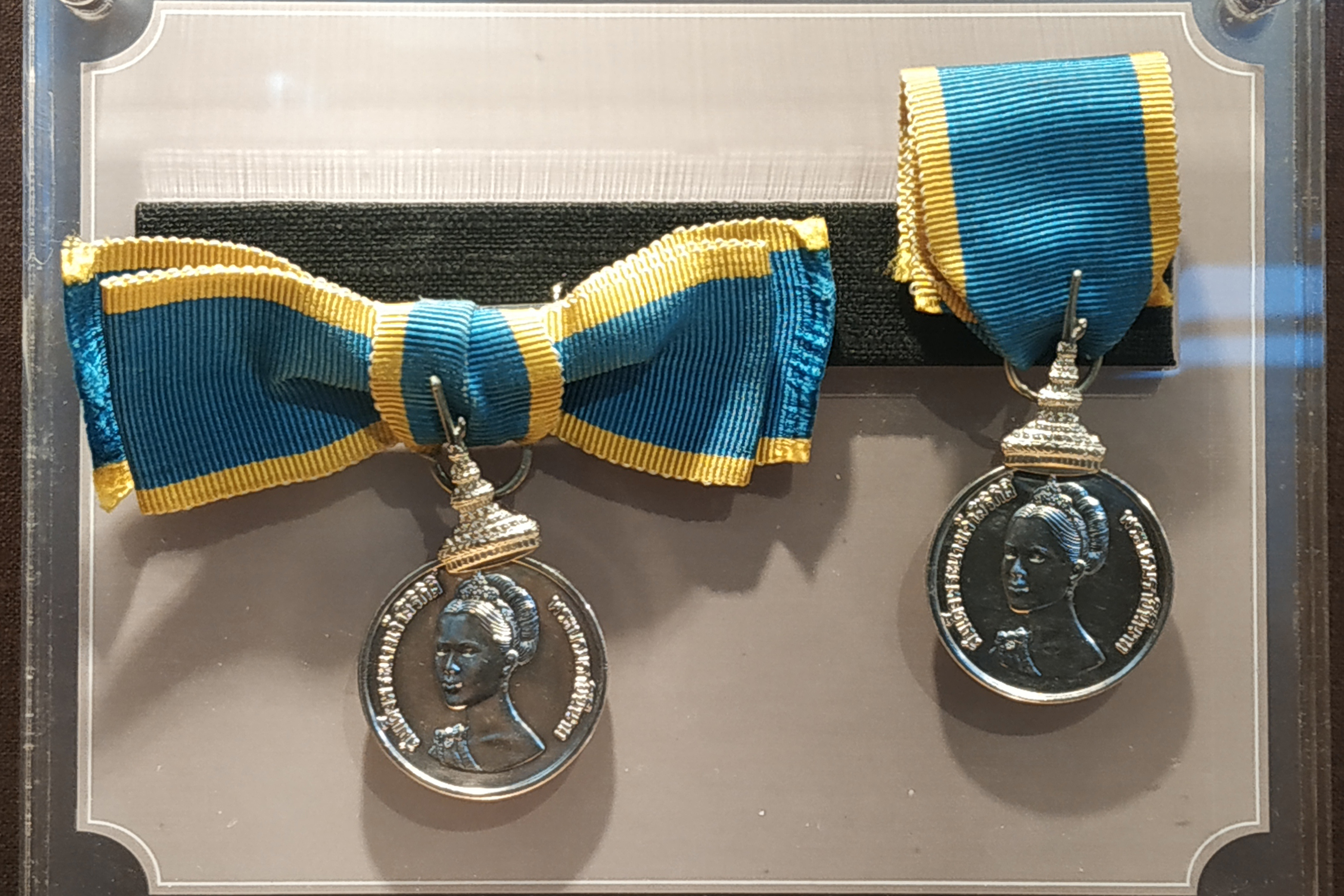
Medal on the Occasion of the 50th Birthday Anniversary of Queen Sirikit, 1982

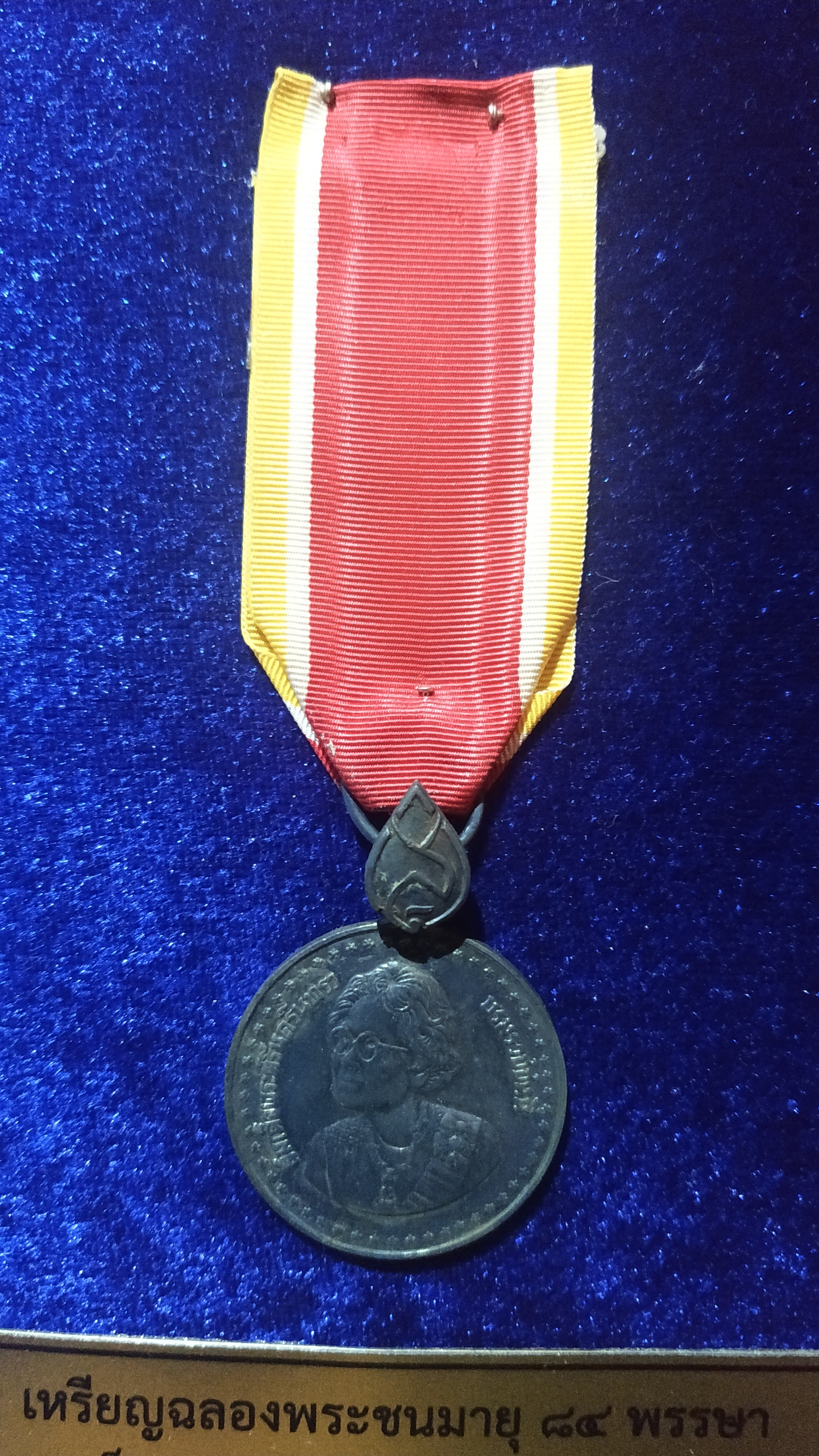
Medal on the Occasion of the 84th Birthday Anniversary of Somdej Phra Srinagarindra Boromarajajonani, 1984

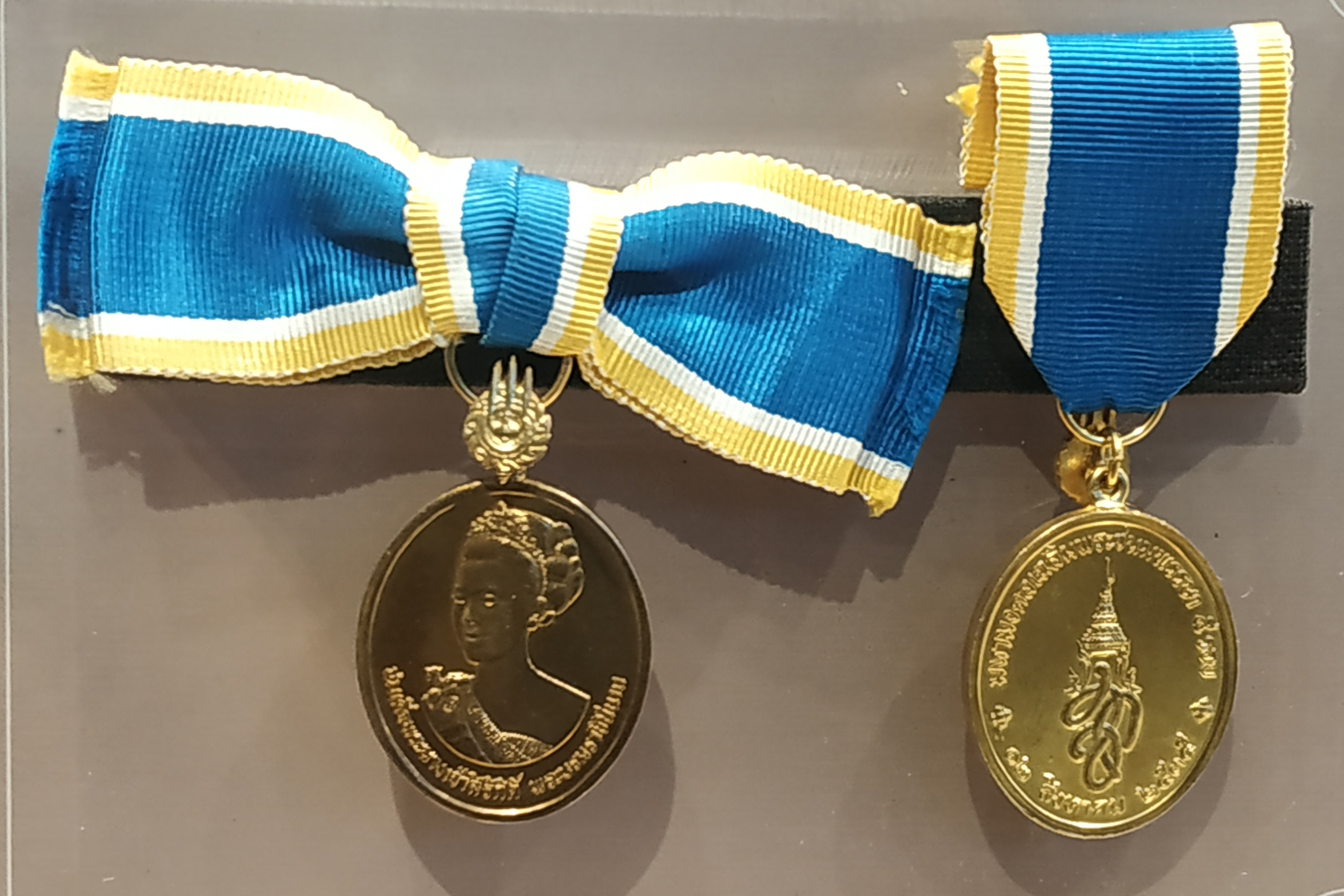
Medal on the Occasion of the 60th Birthday Anniversary of Queen Sirikit, 1992

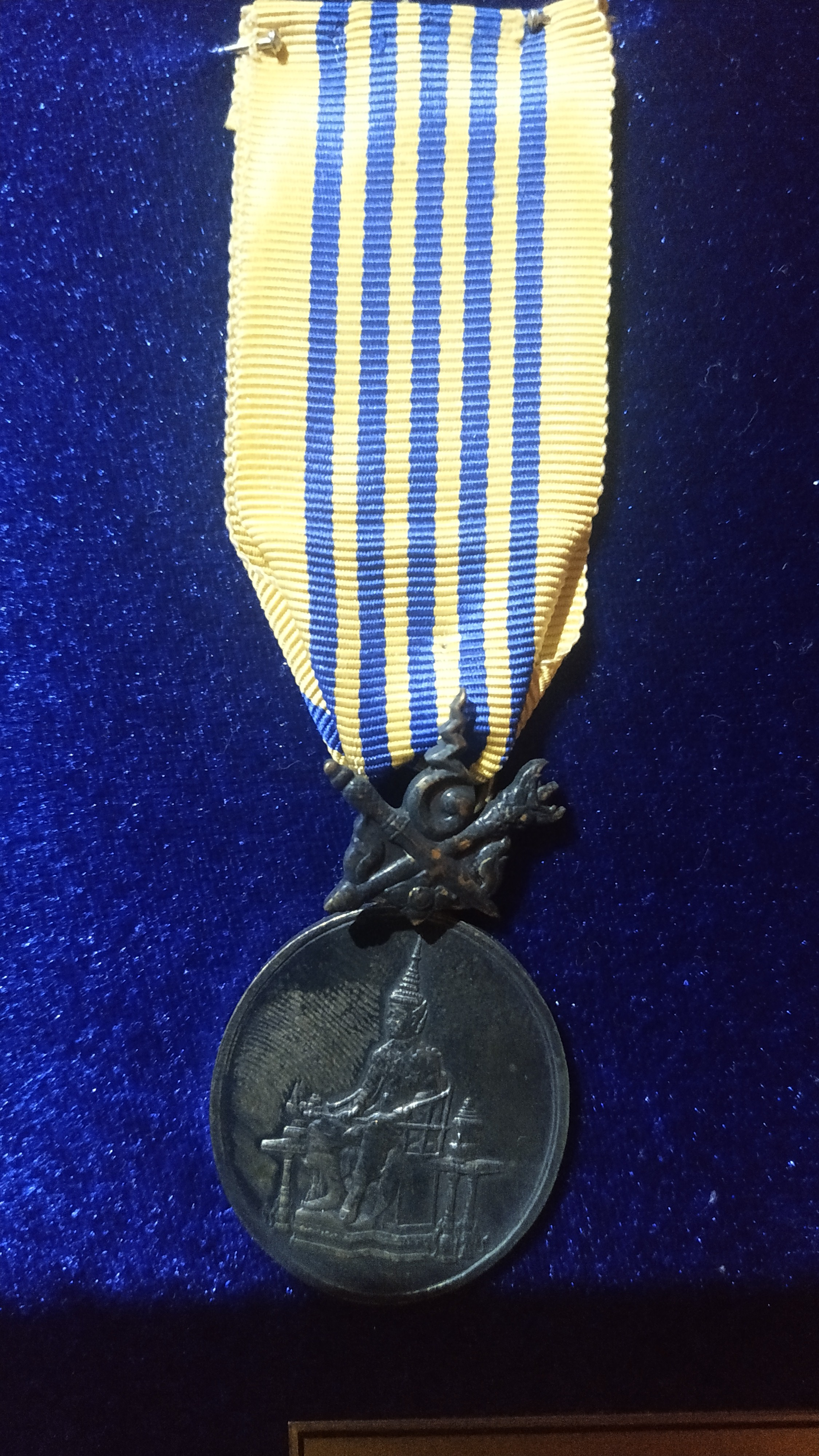
King Bhumibol Adulyadej's Golden Jubilee Medal, 1996

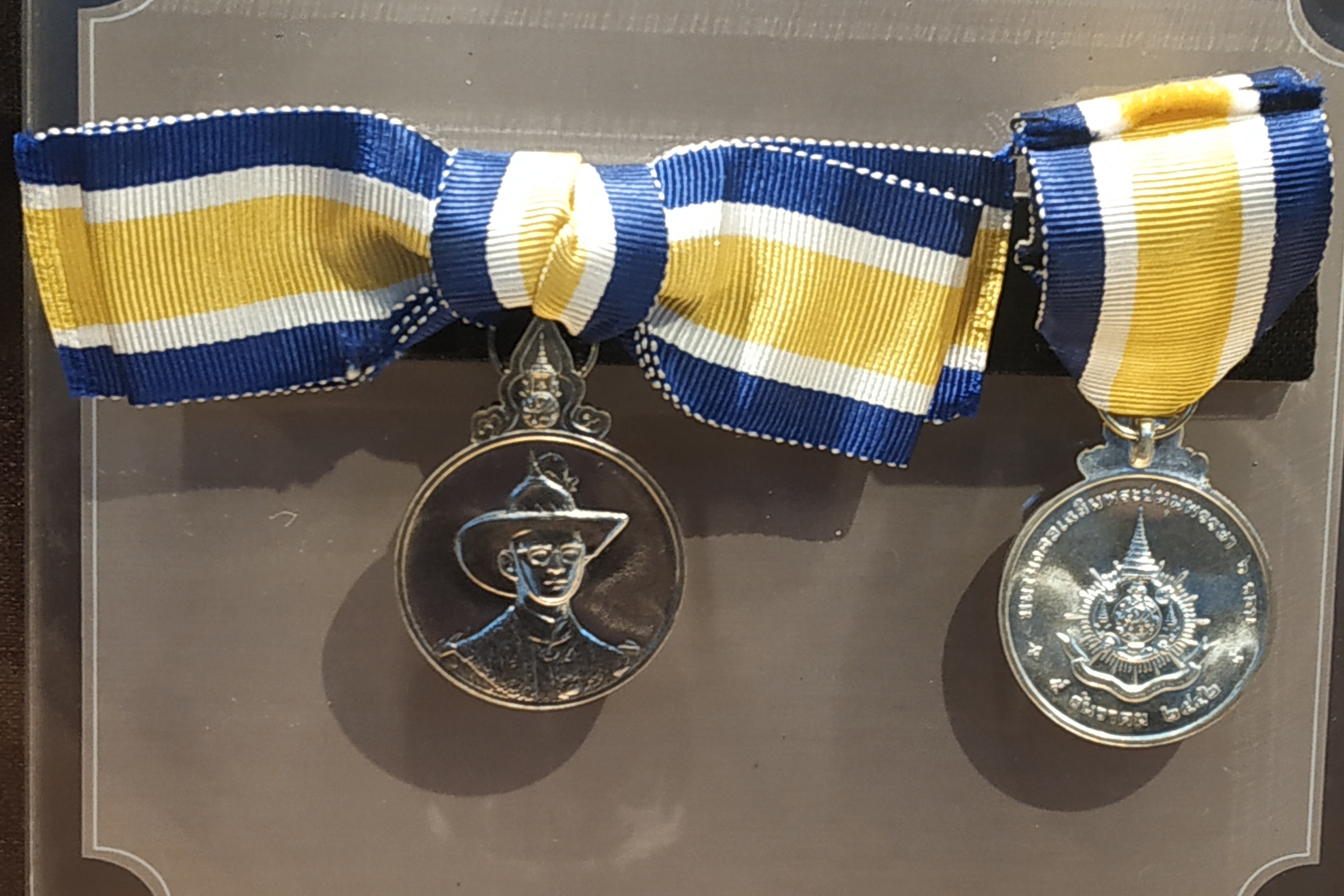
Medal on the Occasion of the 72nd Birthday Anniversary of King Bhumibol Adulyadej, 1999

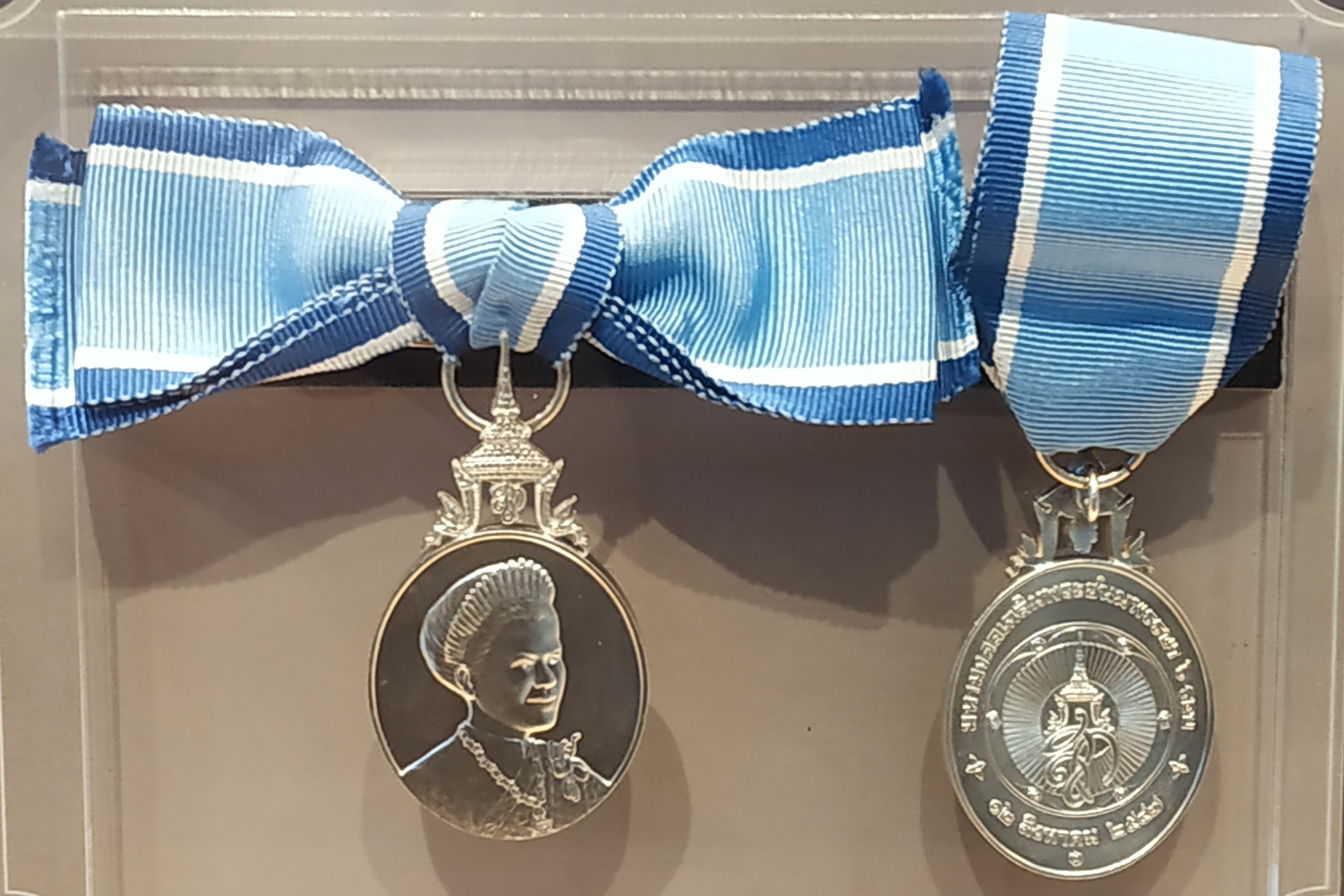
Medal on the Occasion of the 72nd Birthday Anniversary of Queen Sirikit, 2004

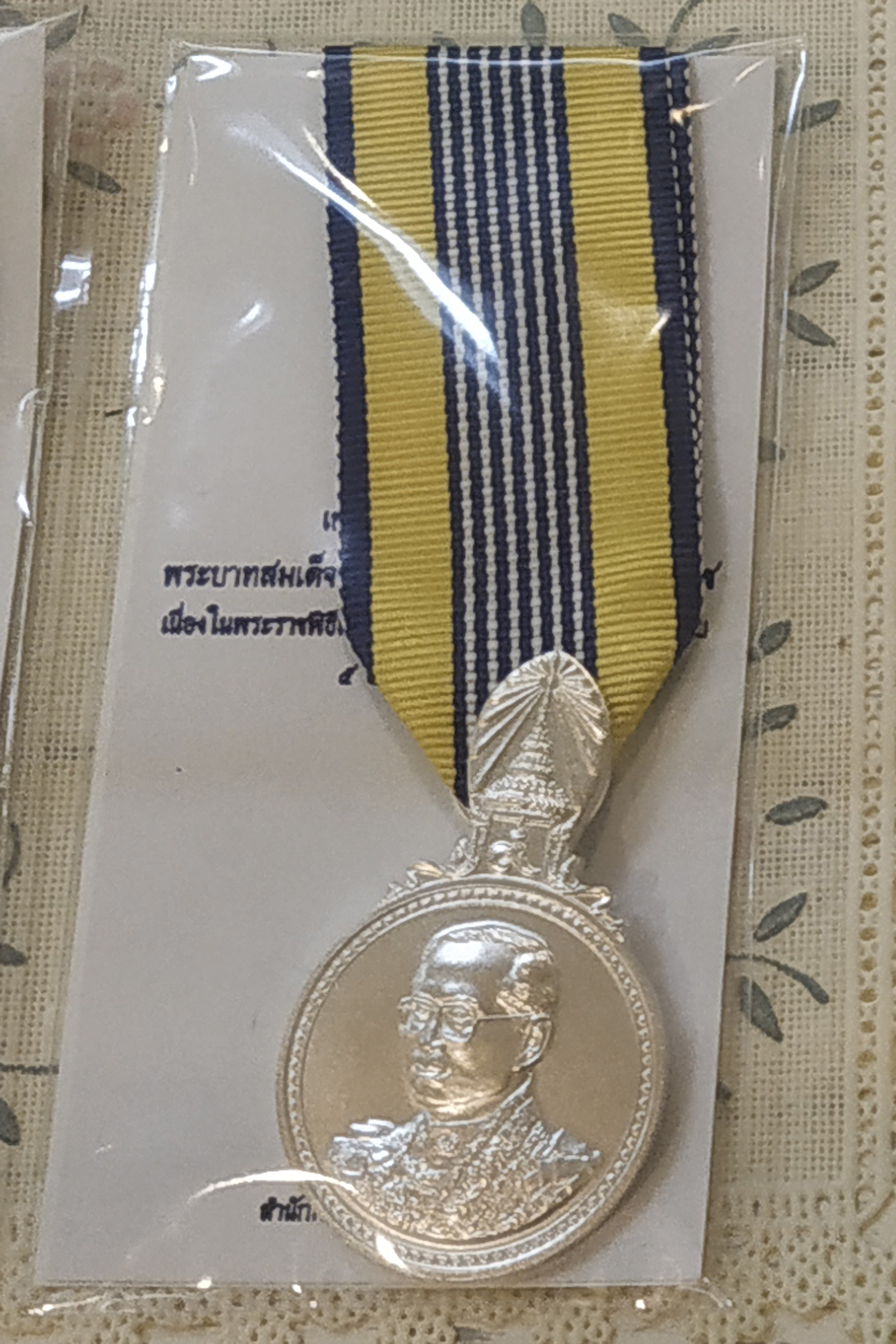
Medal on the Occasion of the 84th Birthday Anniversary of King Bhumibol Adulyadej, 2011

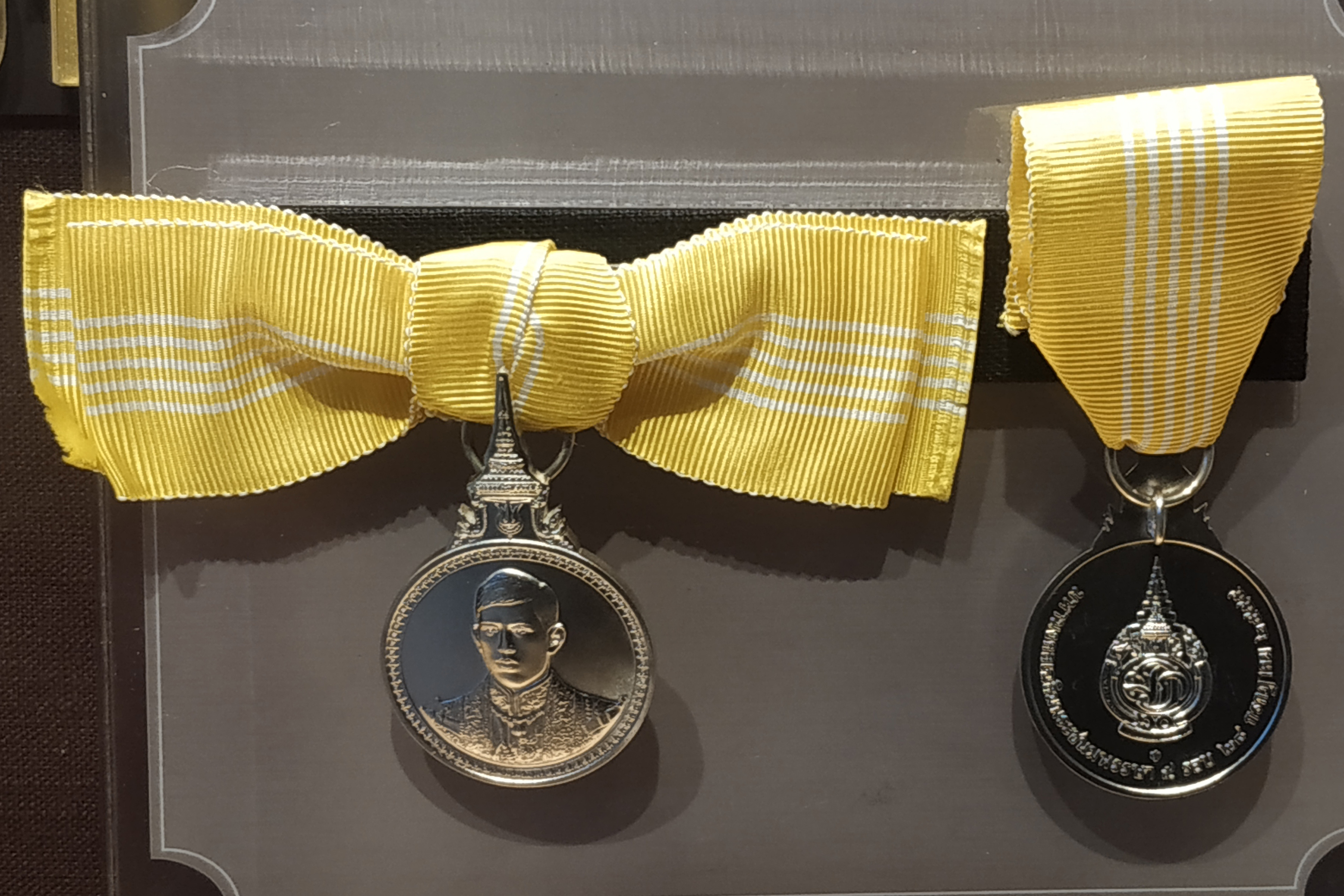
Medal on the Occasion of the 60th Birthday Anniversary of Crown Prince Maha Vajiralongkorn, 2012

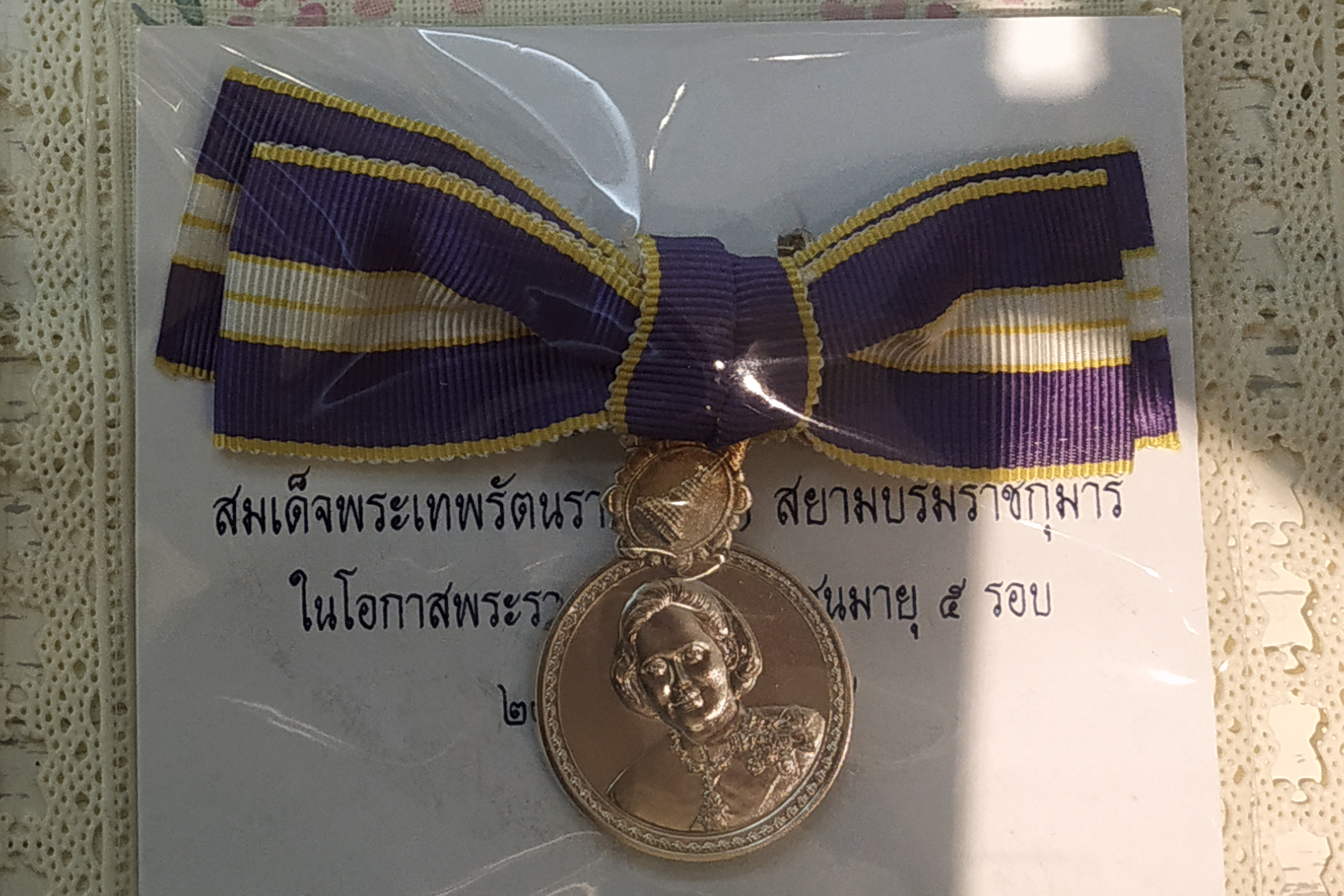
Medal on the Occasion of the 60th Birthday Anniversary of H.R.H. Princess Maha Chakri Sirindhorn, 2015

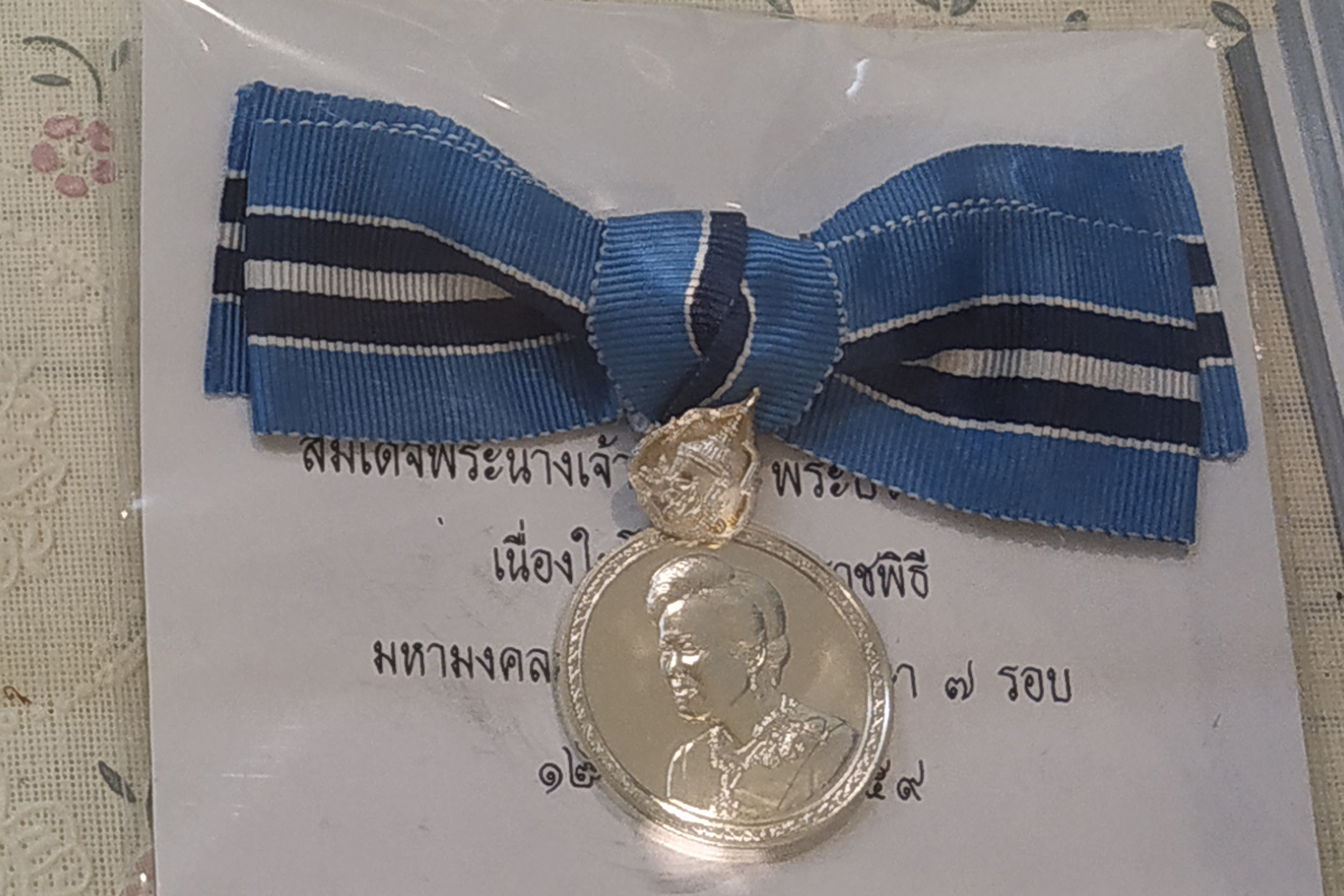
Medal on the Occasion of the 84th Birthday Anniversary of Sirikit, 2016

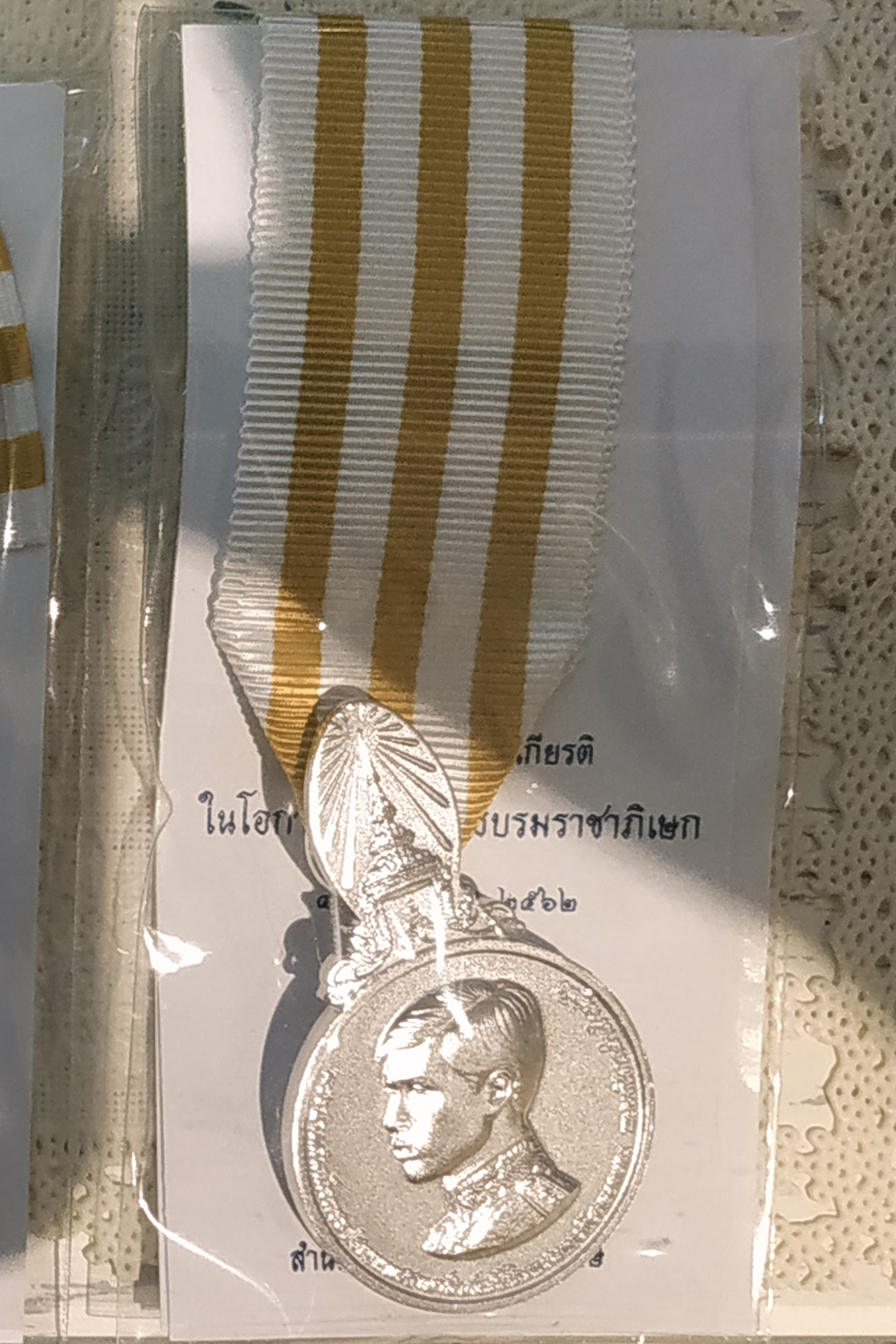
King Maha Vajiralongkorn's Coronation Medal, 2019

=== Thai Red Cross Society medals ===
Ribbon	Honour	Post-nominal letters
	Special Class (Gold Medal) of Red Cross Citation Medal	—
	First Class (Silver Medal) of Red Cross Citation Medal	—
	Second Class (Bronze Medal) of Red Cross Citation Medal	—
	Red Cross Medal of Merit	—
	First Class (Gold Medal) of Red Cross Medal of Appreciation	—
	Second Class (Silver Medal) of Red Cross Medal of Appreciation	—
	Third Class (Bronze Medal) of Red Cross Medal of Appreciation	—

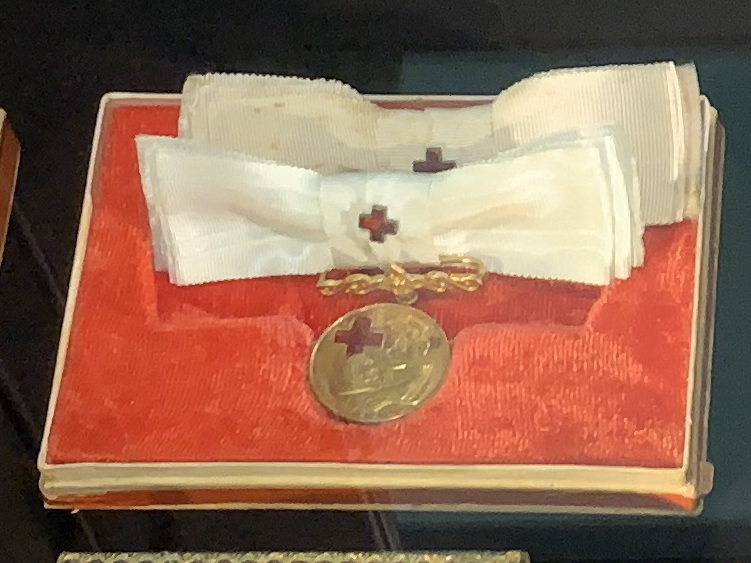
First Class (Gold Medal) of Red Cross Medal of Appreciation (for female)

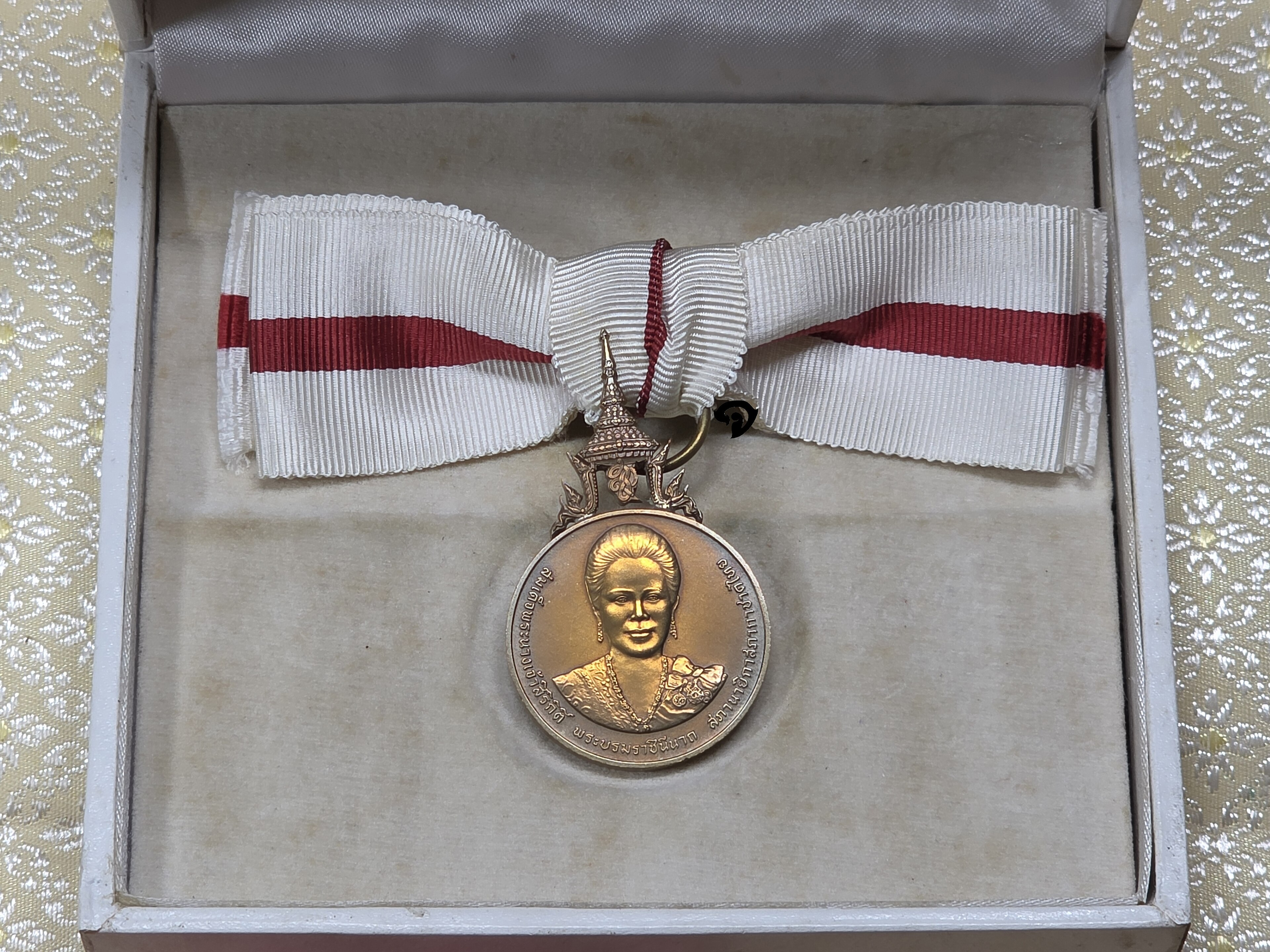
The obverse side of the Second Class (Bronze Medal) Red Cross Citation Medal.

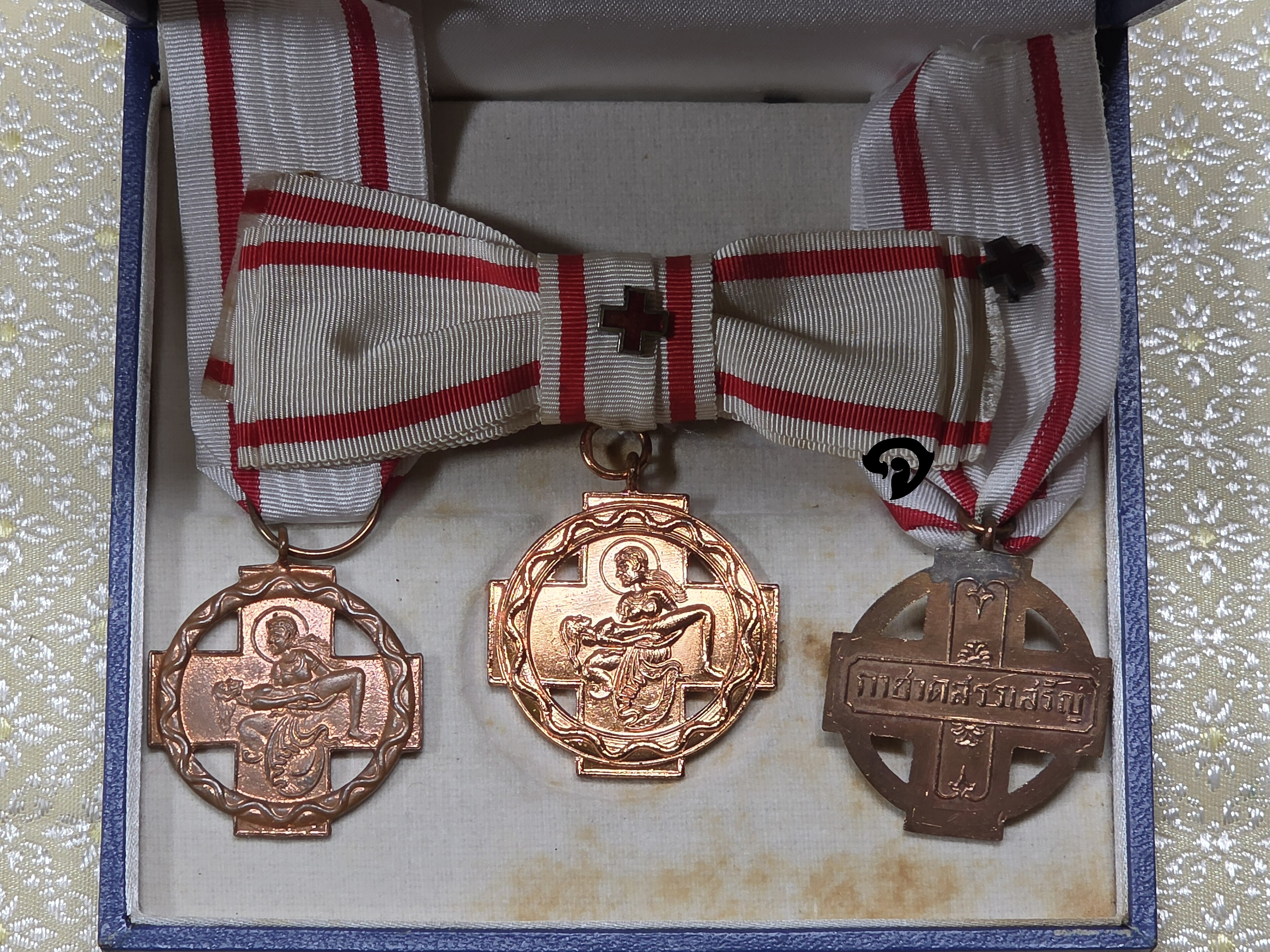
Three medals of the Red Cross Medal of Merit; the medal on the left was made during the reign of Rama VIII, while the center and right medals were made during the reign of Rama IX.

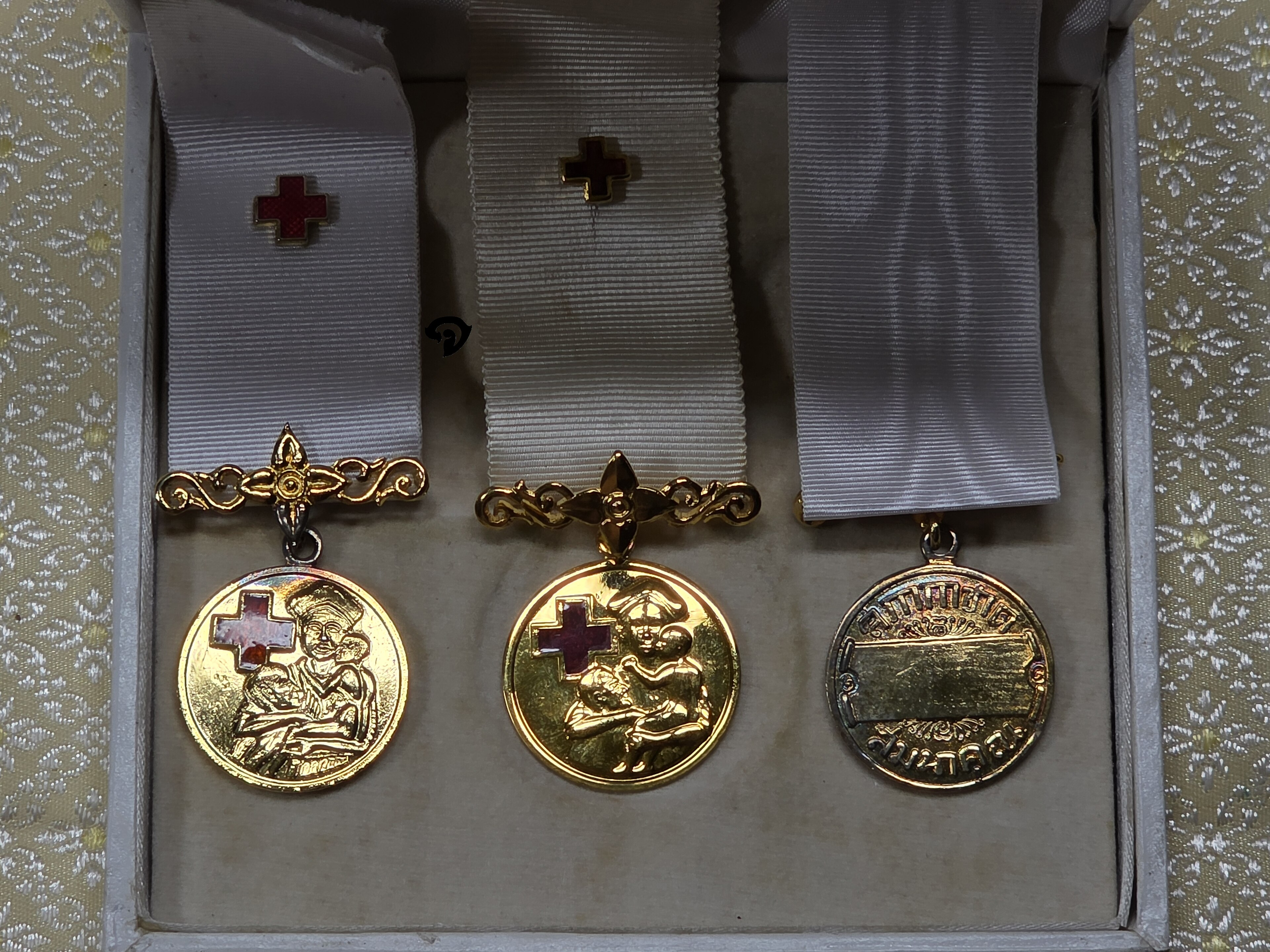
Three medals of the First Class (Gold Medal) Red Cross Medal of Appreciation; two displayed with the obverse side up and one with the reverse side up. The center medal has a metal content of 81.05% gold (Au).

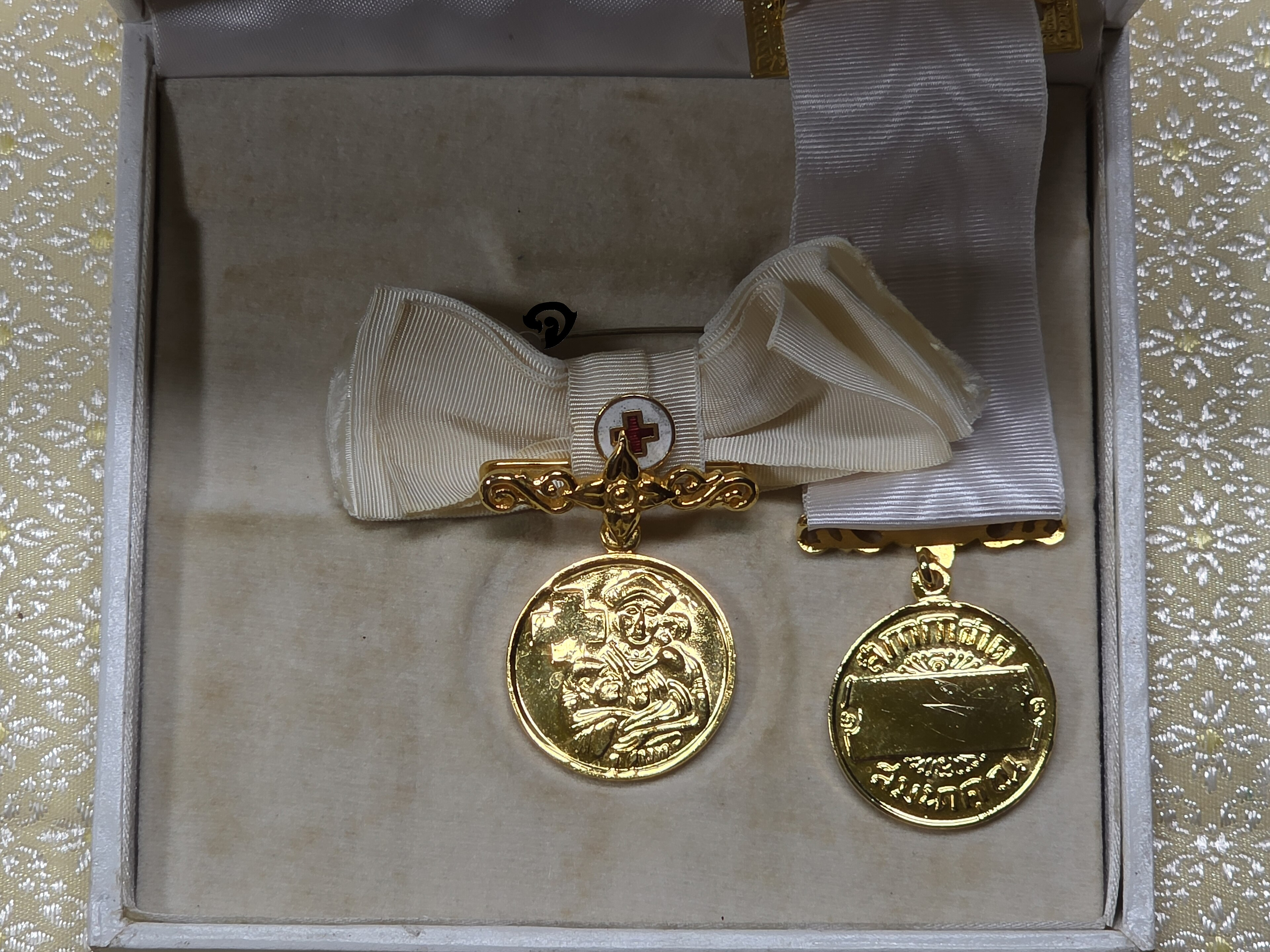
Two medals of the Second Class (Silver Medal) Red Cross Medal of Appreciation, shown with the obverse and reverse sides up.

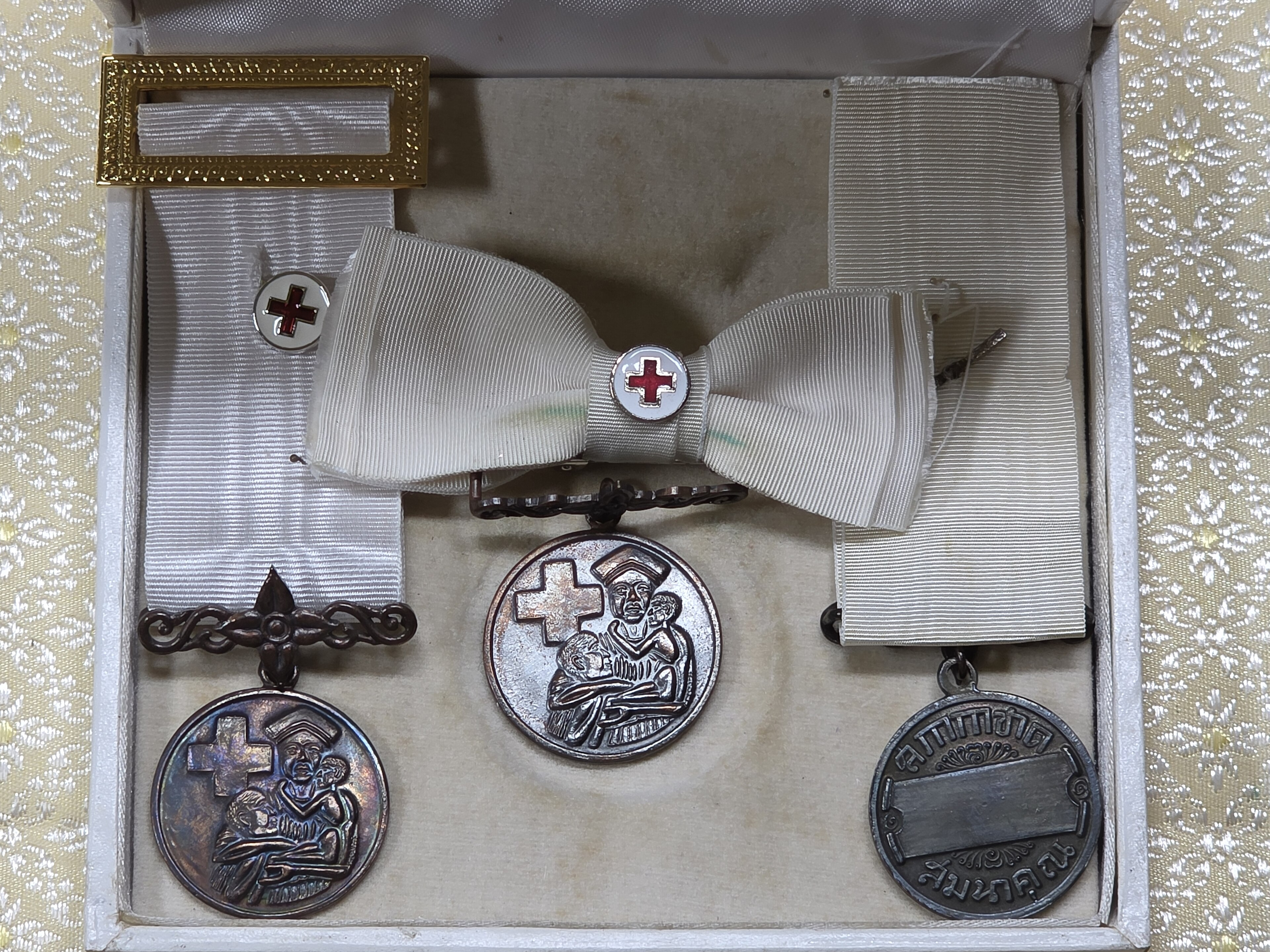
Three medals of the Third Class (Bronze Medal) Red Cross Medal of Appreciation, shown with the obverse and reverse sides up.

== See also ==
- Pavilion of Regalia, Royal Decorations and Coins
