= Sucharit Suda =

Thai royal consort (1895–1981)

Sucharit Suda; พระสุจริตสุดา
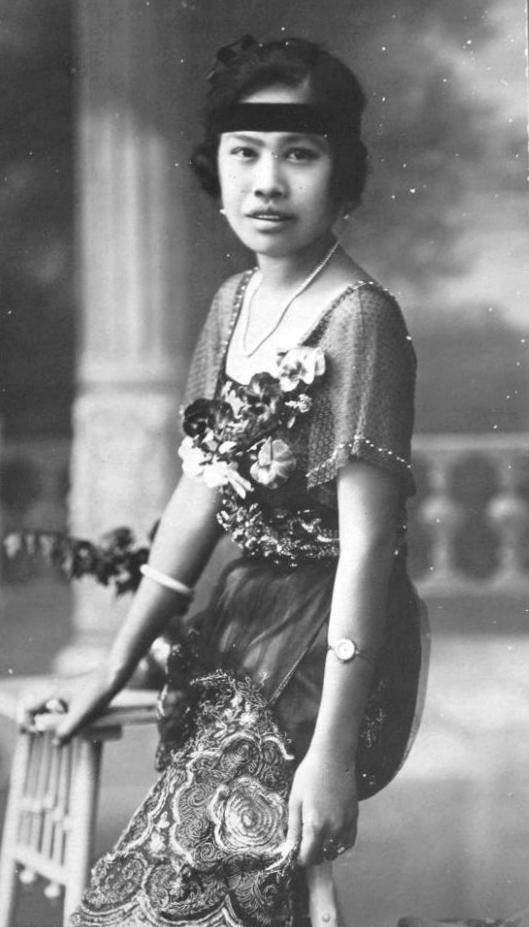

Royal concubine of the Thai monarch
- Tenure: 27 October 1921 – 26 November 1925
- Born: Prueang Sucharitakul; 13 November 1895; Bangkok, Siam
- Died: 9 March 1981 (aged 85); Bangkok, Thailand
- Spouse: Vajiravudh (Rama VI) (m. 1921; died 1925)
- House: Chakri dynasty (by marriage)
- Father: Pluem Sucharitakul
- Mother: Kimlai Tejakambuja

Four wives of Vajiravudh
(by years of marriage)

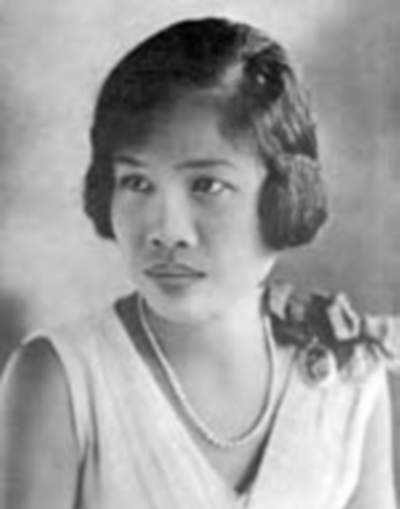
Sucharit Suda
(1921–1925)

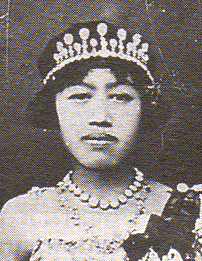
Indrasakdi Sachi
(1922–1925)

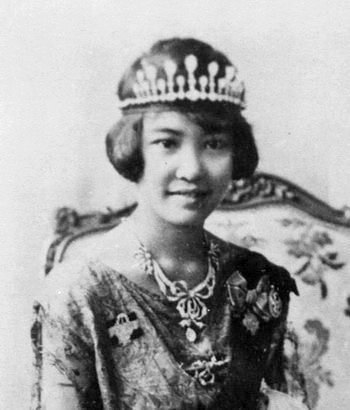
Lakshamilavan
(1922–1925)

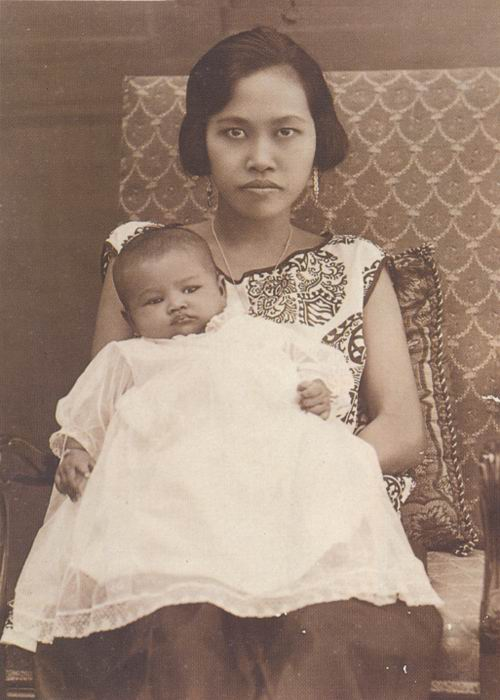
Suvadhana
(1924–1925)

Phra Sucharit Suda (Thai: พระสุจริตสุดา; 13 November 1895 – 9 March 1981), formerly Prueang Sucharitakul (Thai: เปรื่อง สุจริตกุล; RTGS: Prueang Sucharitkun), daughter of Chao Phraya Sudharm Montri, was the High concubine of King Rama VI. She was a cousin from his mother's side. Chao Phraya Sudharm Montri was Princess Piyamavadi Sri Bajarindra Mata's younger brother's son. She fell out of favour, and was replaced by her younger sister, who finally became a queen – Queen Indrasakdi Sachi.

== Early life and marriage ==
Prueang Sucharitakul had presented herself to serve Queen Saovabha Phongsri, later she became an assistant of Princess Vallabhadevi and Princess Lakshamilavan. When she was 26 years old, King Rama VI has requested for her for marriage from her father, Pluem Sucharitakul and graciously Royal Wedding Ceremony at Phayathai Palace on 27 October 1921 and considered the first ordinary woman to attend the ceremony. She earned the noble title of Phra Sucharit Suda (Viscountess Sucharit Suda).

== After the death of the King ==
After the death of King Rama VI, the viscountess residing in Suan Sunandha Palace and then moved to Ban Phra Sucharit Suda at Rama 5 Road, after Vajiravudh College, which received the land from the king and still receive a number of inheritance.

In charity she has donated a lot of nourishment to hospitals such as Chulalongkorn Hospital and donated funds to create Suthit Suda Building in Siriraj Hospital.

== Death ==
She received grace from King Bhumibol Adulyadej and Queen Sirikit graciously bestowed royal expenses for sick time and residence in the area of the Crown Property in Soi Ton Son, Ploenchit Road, Bangkok.

In June 1980, Sucharit Suda got sick and stayed at Siriraj Hospital until the demise on Tuesday 9 March 1981. Total age is 85 years, 3 months, 26 days and received a royal cremation at the crematorium in front of the Pavilion at Wat Debsirin on 29 March 1983.
