= List of post-nominal letters (Thailand) =

Post-nominal letters in Thailand include:

Office	Post-nominal
Honours System
Knight of The Most Auspicious The Most Auspicious Order of the Rajamitrabhorn	ร.ม.ภ.
Knight of the Illustrious Order of the Royal House of Chakri	ม.จ.ก.
Knight of The Ancient and Auspicious Order of the Nine Gems	น.ร.
Knight Grand Cordon (Special Class) of The Most Illustrious Order of Chula Chom Klao	ป.จ.ว.
Knight of the Ratana Varabhorn Order of Merit	ร.ว.
Knight/Dame Grand Cross (First Class) of The Most Illustrious Order of Chula Chom Klao	ป.จ.
Knight Grand Commander of the Honourable Order of Rama	ส.ร
Knight Grand Cordon (Special Class) of the Most Exalted Order of the White Elephant	ม.ป.ช.
Knight Grand Cordon (Special Class) of The Most Noble Order of the Crown of Thailand	ม.ว.ม.
Knight Grand Cross (First Class) of the Most Exalted Order of the White Elephant	ป.ช.
Knight Grand Cross (First Class) of the Most Noble Order of the Crown of Thailand	ป.ม.
Knight Grand Cross (First Class) of the Most Admirable Order of the Direkgunabhorn	ป.ภ.
Knight (or Dame) Grand Commander (Second Class, Upper Grade) of The Most Illustrious Order of Chula Chom Klao	ท.จ.ว.
Knight Commander of the Honourable Order of Rama	ม.ร.
Knight Commander (Second Class) of the Most Exalted Order of the White Elephant	ท.ช.
Knight Commander (Second Class) of The Most Noble Order of the Crown of Thailand	ท.ม.
Knight Commander (Second Class) of the Most Admirable Order of the Direkgunabhorn	ท.ภ
Knight and Dame Commander (Second Class, lower grade) of The Most Illustrious Order of Chula Chom Klao	ท.จ.
Commander of the Honourable Order of Rama	ย.ร.
The Vallabhabhorn Order	ว.ภ.
Grand Companion (Third Class, upper grade) of the Most Illustrious Order of Chula Chom Klao	ต.จ.ว.
Companion of the Honourable Order of Rama	อ.ร.
Commander (Third Class) of the Most Exalted Order of the White Elephant	ต.ช.
Commander (Third Class) of The Most Noble Order of the Crown of Thailand	ต.ม.
Commander (Third Class) of the Most Admirable Order of the Direkgunabhorn	ต.ภ.
Companion (Third Class, lower grade) of the Most Illustrious Order of Chula Chom Klao	ต.จ.
Companion (Fourth Class) of the Most Exalted Order of the White Elephant	จ.ช.
Companion (Fourth Class) of The Most Noble Order of the Crown of Thailand	จ.ม.
Companion (Fourth Class) of the Most Admirable Order of the Direkgunabhorn	จ.ภ.
Junior Companion of the Most Illustrious Order of Chula Chom Klao	ต.อ.จ.
Fourth Class of the Most Illustrious Order of Chula Chom Klao	จ.จ.
Member (Fifth Class) of the Most Exalted Order of the White Elephant	บ.ช.
Member (Fifth Class) of The Most Noble Order of the Crown of Thailand	บ.ม.
Member (Fifth Class) of the Most Admirable Order of the Direkgunabhorn	บ.ม.
Member of the Vajira Mala Order	ว.ม.ล.
Member (Fifth Class) of The Rama Medal for Gallantry in Action of the Honourable Order of Rama	ร.ม.ก.
Member (Sixth Class) of The Rama Medal of the Honourable Order of Rama	ร.ม
Gold Medal (Sixth Class) of the White Elephant	ร.ท.ช.
Gold Medal (Sixth Class) of the Crown of Thailand	ร.ท.ม.
Gold Medal (Sixth Class) of the Direkgunabhorn	ร.ท.ภ.
Silver Medal (Seventh Class) of the White Elephant	ร.ง.ช.
Silver Medal (Seventh Class) of the Crown of Thailand	ร.ง.ม.
Silver Medal (Seventh Class) of the Direkgunabhorn	ร.ง.ภ.

== See also ==
- Lists of post-nominal letters
- Orders, decorations, and medals of Thailand
