= Vijit Sookmark =

Thai military officer and politician (1933–2023)

Minister of Defence
- In office 29 September 1992 – 13 July 1995
- Preceded by: Banjob Bunnag
- Succeeded by: Chavalit Yongchaiyudh

Personal details
- Born: 18 June 1933
- Died: 7 May 2023 (aged 89) Bangkok, Thailand
- Education: Chulachomklao Royal Military Academy; United States Military Academy
- Occupation: Military officer

Vijit Sookmark (also spelled Vichit and Sukmak/Sukmark, Thai: วิจิตร สุขมาก; 18 June 1933 – 7 May 2023) was a Thai military officer and politician who served as Minister of Defence from 1992 to 1995.

Vijit died of sepsis in Bangkok on 7 May 2023 at the age of 89.

== Honours ==
=== National honours ===
- Knight Grand Cordon of the Order of the White Elephant
- Knight Grand Cordon of the Order of the Crown of Thailand
- Victory Medal – Korean War
- Victory Medal – Vietnam War with flames
- Border Service Medal
- Boy Scout Citation Medal of Vajira, First Class
- King Rama IX Coronation Medal

=== Foreign Honours ===
- USA :
  - Officer of the Legion of Merit (1982)
  - Army Commendation Medal (1968)
  - National Defense Service Medal (1968)
- South Vietnam :
  - Vietnam Campaign Medal (1968)

==== Unit Citation ====
- Army Meritorious Unit Commendation (1968)
