= Bejaratana =

Thai princess (1925–2011)

Bejaratana; เพชรรัตน
- Princess of Nakhon Pathom
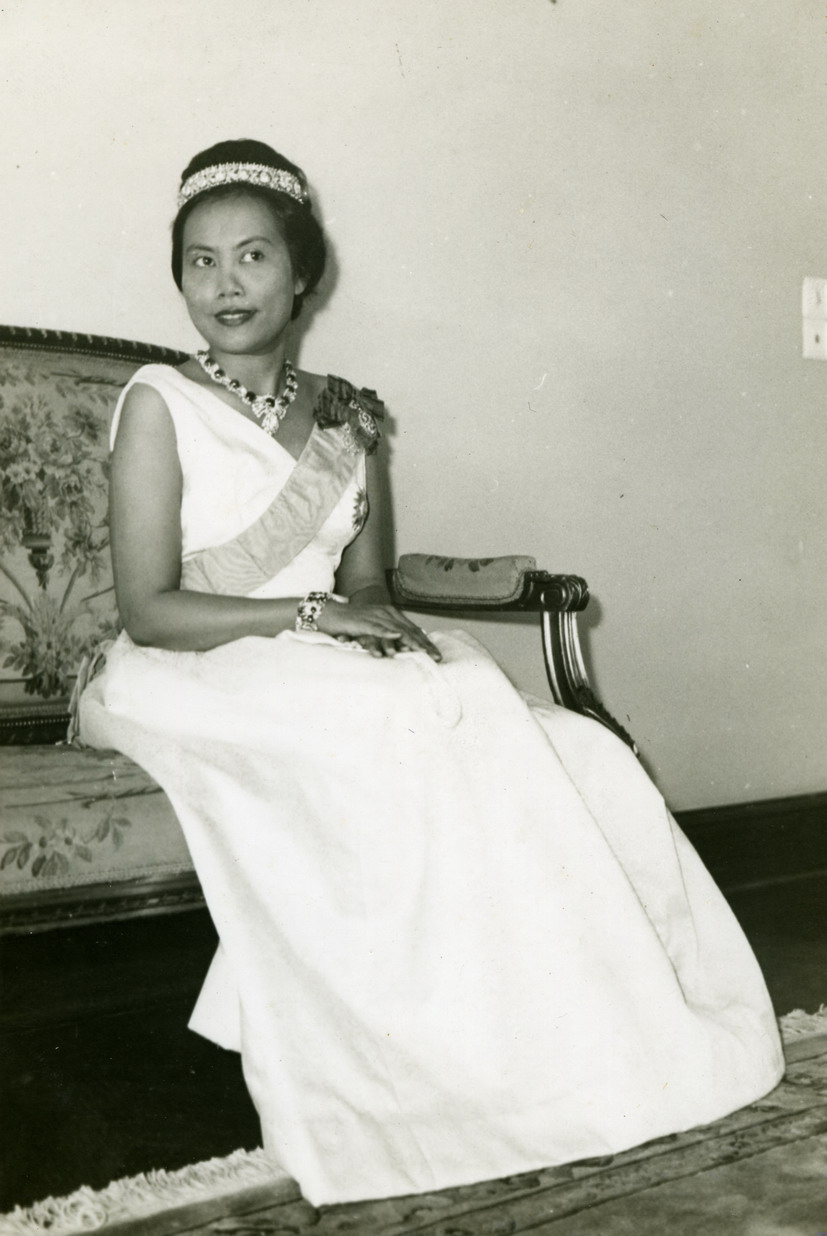
- Born: 24 November 1925; Bangkok, Siam
- Died: 27 July 2011 (aged 85); Bangkok, Thailand
- Burial: 12 April 2012; Sanam Luang, Bangkok
- Dynasty: Chakri
- Father: Vajiravudh (Rama VI)
- Mother: Suvadhana
- Religion: Theravada Buddhism

Bejaratana Rajasuda, Princess of Nakhon Pathom (Note: Thai: เพชรรัตนราชสุดา; Thai pronunciation: [pʰêttɕʰarát râːttɕʰasùdāː]; RTGS: Phetcharat Ratchasuda) (25 November 1925 – 27 July 2011) was the only child of the King Vajiravudh of Thailand. She was a first cousin of King Bhumibol Adulyadej as well as a third cousin to Prince Bhisadej Rajani on her paternal side and third cousin of King Norodom Sihanouk of Cambodia on her maternal side.

Her funeral was held on 9 April 2012, at Sanam Luang ceremonial ground in Bangkok.

== Biography ==
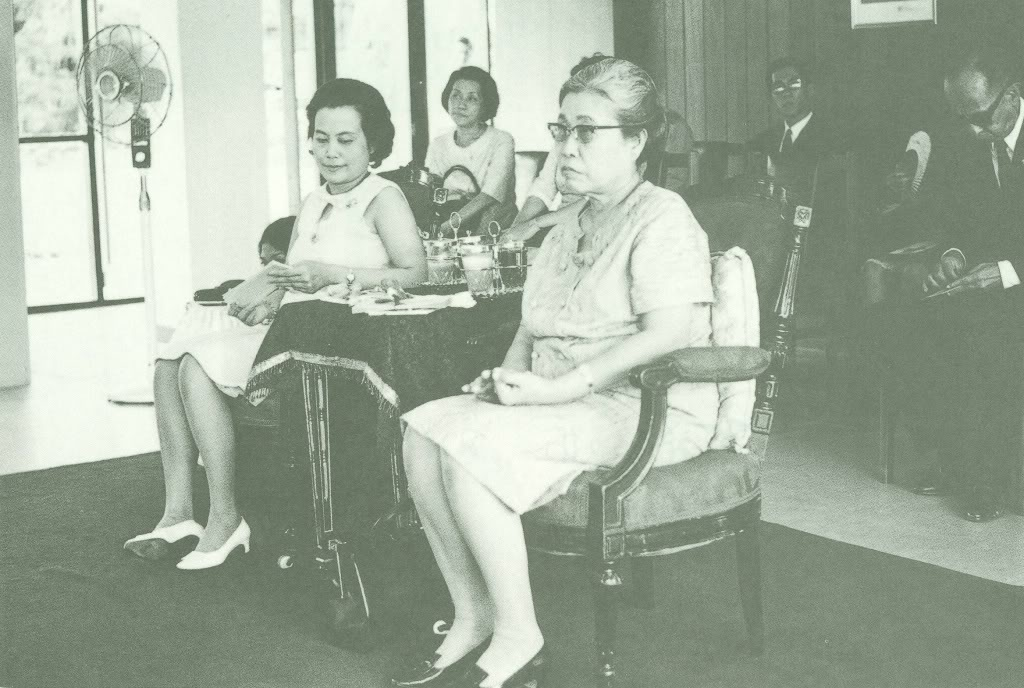
Bejaratana Rajasuda (left) and her mother, Suvadhana

Princess Bejaratana was born on 25 November 1925 in the Grand Palace, Bangkok, the only child of King Vajiravudh (Rama VI) and Princess Suvadhana. Having seen his daughter only one time, the king died the following day. Her uncle, who became King Prajadhipok (Rama VII), performed the naming ceremony for the princess on 30 December.

Princess Bejaratana and her mother moved to Suan Hongsa Villa in Dusit Palace, where she received her education from a private tutor. They moved in with Queen Sri Savarindira (the Queen Dowager) during World War II, and the princess attended Rajani School until she was 12. She and her mother then moved to England, where she continued her education and took medication for her poor health. She first stayed at Fairhill Villa in Surrey, before settling in Brighton.

In November 1957, Princess Bejaratana returned to Thailand. She bought land on Sukhumvit Road Soi 38, and built Ruenruedi Villa Palace. The princess undertook her duties of representing the royal family. Her special interests were in education, public health, Buddhism, the soldiers and police guarding Thailand's borders, and general public welfare.

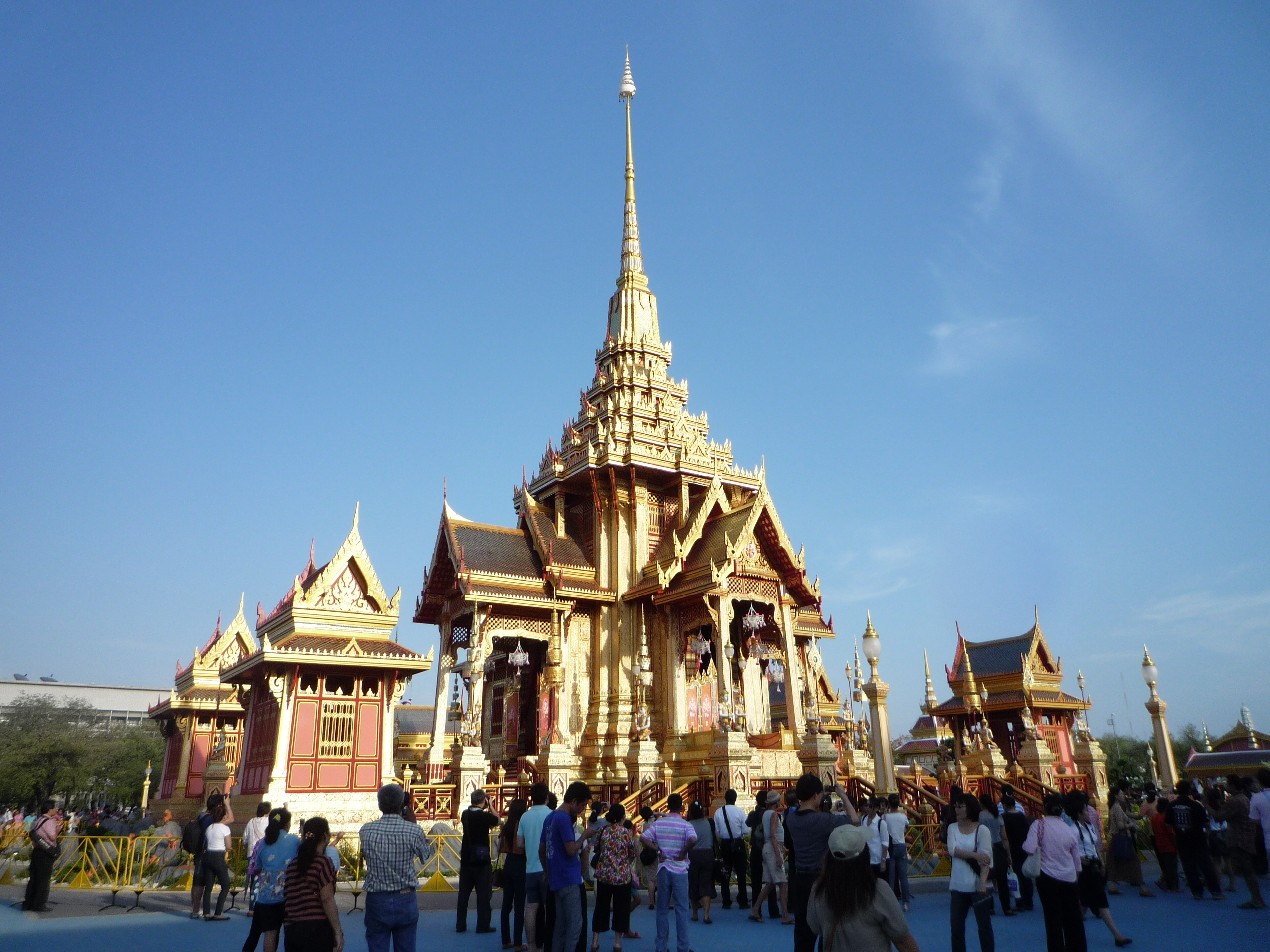
The royal crematorium of Princess Bejaratana Rajasuda at Sanam Luang

Near the end of her life she reduced her royal duties due to age, but occasionally still did work relating to her royal father.

Princess Bejaratana died on 27 July 2011 at 16:37 at Siriraj Hospital, Bangkok, aged 85.

== Military rank ==
- General, Admiral and Air Chief Marshal

== Title, styles, and honours ==
Title and Styles

- 24 November 1925 - 27 July 2011 : Her Royal Highness Princess Bejaratana Rajasuda Sirisobhabannavadi

After her Passing

- 24 November 2025: Her Royal Highness Princess Bejaratana Rajasuda Sirisobhabannavadi, Princess of Nakhon Pathom

Honours

- Dame of the Most Illustrious Order of the Royal House of Chakri (1957)
- Dame of the Ratana Varabhorn Order of Merit (1925)
- Dame Grand Cross (First Class) of the Most Illustrious Order of Chula Chom Klao (1958)
- Dame Grand Cordon (Special Class) of the Most Exalted Order of the White Elephant (1992)
- Dame Grand Cordon (Special Class) of the Most Noble Order of the Crown of Thailand (1967)
- Dame Grand Cross (First Class) of the Most Admirable Order of the Direkgunabhorn (1995)
- Member (Special Class) of the Order of Symbolic Propitiousness Ramkeerati (1990)
- King Rama VI Royal Cypher Medal, 1st Class (1925)
- King Rama VII Royal Cypher Medal, 1st Class (1926)
- King Rama IX Royal Cypher Medal, 1st Class (1986)
- First Class (Gold Medal) of the Red Cross Medal of Appreciation (1967)

== Notes ==
Bejaratana House of Chakri Born: 24 November 1925 Died: 27 July 2011
Order of precedence
Preceded by Princess of Naradhiwas	Eldest Royal Member of the Chakri Dynasty; 2008–2011	Succeeded by King Rama IX
