= Vallabhabhorn Order =

The Vallabhabhorn Order เครื่องราชอิสริยาภรณ์ตราวัลลภาภรณ์
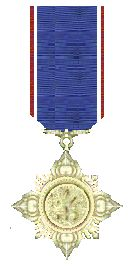
- Pendant of the Order

Awarded by the King of Thailand
- Type: Order of Merit
- Established: 22 March 1919
- Eligibility: Military and Civilian Order
- Awarded for: services rendered under King Vajiravudh’s reign
- Status: Dormant
- Founder: HM King Vajiravudh (Rama VI)
- Grades: 1 (Member)

Statistics
- First induction: 22 March 1919
- Last induction: 27 February 1924
- Total inductees: 73

Precedence
- Next (higher): Order of the Direkgunabhorn
- Next (lower): Order of Ramkeerati
- Ribbon bar of the Vallabhabhorn Order.

The Vallabhabhorn Order (Thai: เครื่องราชอิสริยาภรณ์ตราวัลลภาภรณ์) was established on 22 March 1919 (B.E. 2461) by King Rama VI of The Kingdom of Siam (now Thailand) to reward personal service to the sovereign.

Members of the order are entitled to use the postnominals ว.ภ.

The decoration consists of a single class. The insignia is an 8 pointed silver pendant suspended from the ribbon.

The order is named in honor of Princess Vallabha Devi.

== See also ==
- Orders, decorations, and medals of Thailand
