= Lakshamilavan =

Princess consort of Siam (1899–1961)

Lakshamilavan; ลักษมีลาวัณ
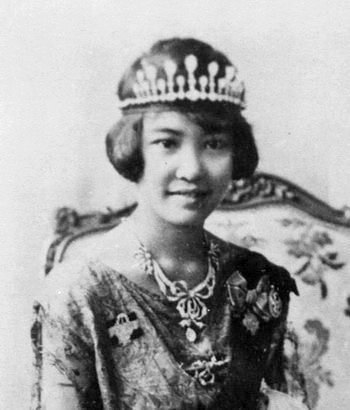

Princess consort of Siam
- Tenure: 27 August 1922 – 26 November 1925
- Born: Wanphimon Worawan; 3 July 1899; Bangkok, Siam
- Died: 29 August 1961 (aged 62); Bangkok, Thailand
- Spouse: Vajiravudh (Rama VI) (m. 1922; died 1925)
- House: Worawan (Chakri dynasty)
- Father: Worawannakon, Prince Narathip Praphanphong
- Mother: Tat Montrikul
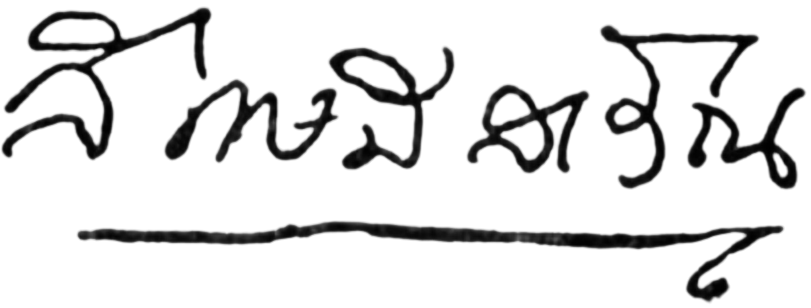
- Signature

Four wives of Vajiravudh
(by years of marriage)

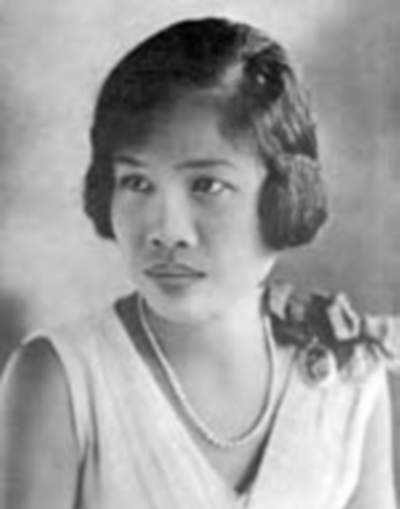
Sucharit Suda
(1921–1925)

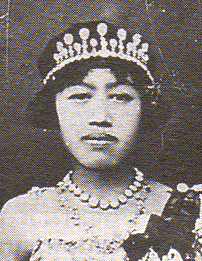
Indrasakdi Sachi
(1922–1925)

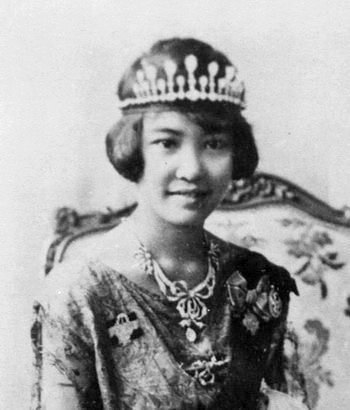
Lakshamilavan
(1922–1925)

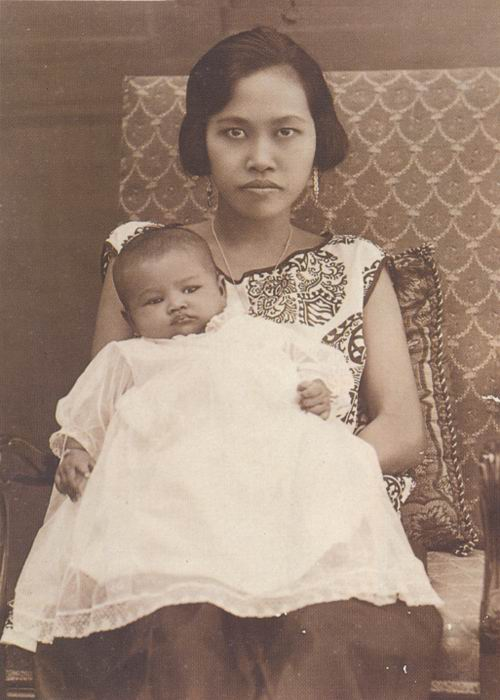
Suvadhana
(1924–1925)

Lakshamilavan, also spelled Lakshami Lavan (Thai: ลักษมีลาวัณ; RTGS: Laksamilawan; 3 July 1899 – 29 August 1961), born Princess Wanphimon Worawan (Thai: วรรณพิมล วรวรรณ), was a royal consort of King Vajiravudh (Rama VI) of Siam. Her father was Worawannakon, Prince Narathip Praphanphong, a well-accepted poet and artist of the day. She was a Thai writer and a member of the Thai royal family.

== Early life and marriage ==
Princess Lakshamilavan was born at the Worawan Palace, on 3 July 1899, the only daughter of Worawannakon, Prince Narathip Praphanphong and Mom Luang (The Honourable) Tat Montrikul, and best known in the palace by her nickname of "Tew" (Thai: ติ๋ว; RTGS: Tio). Her elder half-sister, Princess Vallabha Devi (also spelled Warnrabhathewee), ex-fiancée of King Vajiravudh.

She was initially named Wanphimon (วรรณพิมล), and changed to Lakshamilavan (ลักษมีลาวัณ), in 1920 by upon order of King Vajiravudh. and the same year, Princess Vallabha Devi, her half-sister engaged to King Vajiravudh. However, four months later in 1921, Vajiravudh nullified the engagement and pursued Princess Vallabha's sister, Princess Lakshamilavan, whom he engaged, but the marriage was never held and the couple then separated, because King Vajiravudh married Prueng Sucharitakul on 27 October 1921.

On 27 August 1922, the king elevated her to Princess consort (พระนางเธอ) to console her. Later Lakshamilavan separated her residence from her husband and her family, she always said "I don't care".

== Life after the king's death ==
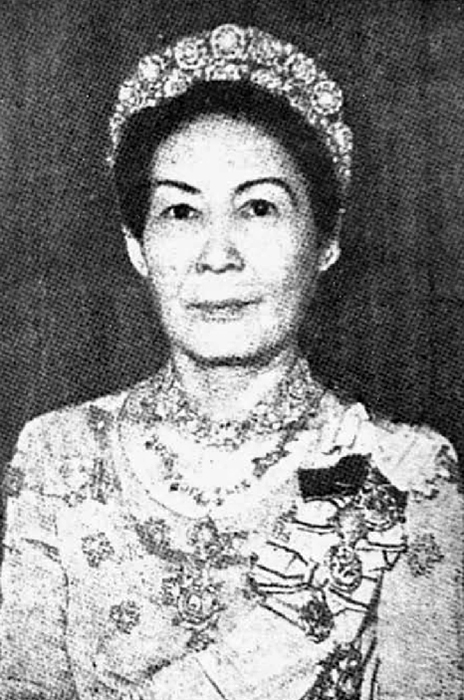
Princess Lakshamilavan in 1959

After the king's death in 1925, she received an inheritance. She began writing novels under pen name, Patthama (ปัทมะ), Wanphimon (วรรณพิมล) and Phra Nang Thoe Lakshamilavan (พระนางเธอลักษมีลาวัณ). After World War II, she moved to Lakshami Vilas Villa to spend time writing novels.

== Death ==
On the evening of 29 August 1961, Lakshamilavan was murdered by two men: Sa-ngiam "Saeng" Homchan and Charoen Kanchanaphai, Lakshami's former gardeners, endeavoring to steal the wealth left to her by the king. They repeatedly struck her across the head using a crowbar while she was gardening. Her dead body was found near a garage at the villa five days after the attack. The murderer attempted to pawn the decorations he had stolen from the princess, unaware of the items' special value. The pawnshop owner, having recognized the valuables as royal property, informed the police.

== Writings ==
- Yua Rak (ยั่วรัก)
- Chiwit Wam (ชีวิตหวาม)
- Sueam Siang Sap (เสื่อมเสียงสาป)
- Rak Rangkae (รักรังแก)
- Sonthe Saneha (สนเท่ห์สเน่หา)
- Chok Chueam Chiwit (โชคเชื่อมชีวิต)
- Ruean Chai Thi Rai Kha (เรือนใจที่ไร้ค่า)
- Phai Rak Khong Chanchala (ภัยรักของจันจลา)
