= Ratana Varabhorn Order of Merit =

The Ratana Varabhorn Order of Merit รัตนวราภรณ์
- Pendant of the Ratana Varabhorn Order

Awarded by the King of Thailand
- Type: Order of Merit
- Established: 1 August 1911
- Motto: ร.ร.๖ means King Rama VI
- Eligibility: Military and Civilian Order who is Officials during King Vajiravudh was reigning
- Awarded for: Memorial in official during King Vajiravudh reign.
- Status: Dormant
- Founder: King Vajiravudh (Rama VI)
- Grades: Knight/Dame

Statistics
- First induction: 1 August 1911
- Last induction: 14 April 1942
- Total inductees: 77

Precedence
- Next (higher): Order of Chula Chom Klao
- Next (lower): Order of Rama
- Ribbon bar of the Ratana Varabhorn Order

The Ratana Varabhorn Order of Merit (Thai: เครื่องราชอิสริยาภรณ์ตรารัตนวราภรณ์; RTGS: Rattanawaraphon) was established on 1 August 1911 by King Rama VI of The Kingdom of Siam (now Thailand) to reward personal service to the sovereign. Members are entitled to use the postnominals ร.ว.

"The Ratana Varabhorn Order of Merit" meant The Order of Merit of the Crown Jewel.

== Insignia ==
The decoration consists of a single class (Knight). The insignia for this class is a pendant on the order chain or on the neck ribbon.

- The Order chain consists of the royal monograms in white enamel, which are interrupted with gold Thai royal crowns, and with the royal emblems in blue enamel. The central locket of chain is the royal emblem made from diamonds.
- The pendant has a dark-blue enamel field, surrounded by a ring of diamonds. The ring is surrounded by four small sceptres with elephant tusks, eight diamond leaves and four gold cyphers. The pendant is crowned with the royal crown, with a beam of sunlight at the tip.

== Selected recipients ==
- King Prajadhipok
- Queen Savang Vadhana
- Prince Chakrabongse Bhuvanath
- Princess Indrasakdi Sachi
- Prince Boworadet
- Princess Suvadhana
- Princess Bejaratana
- Field Marshal Plaek Phibunsongkhram
- Prince Aditya Dibabha
