= Suvadhana =

Siamese princess consort (1905–1985)

Suvadhana; สุวัทนา
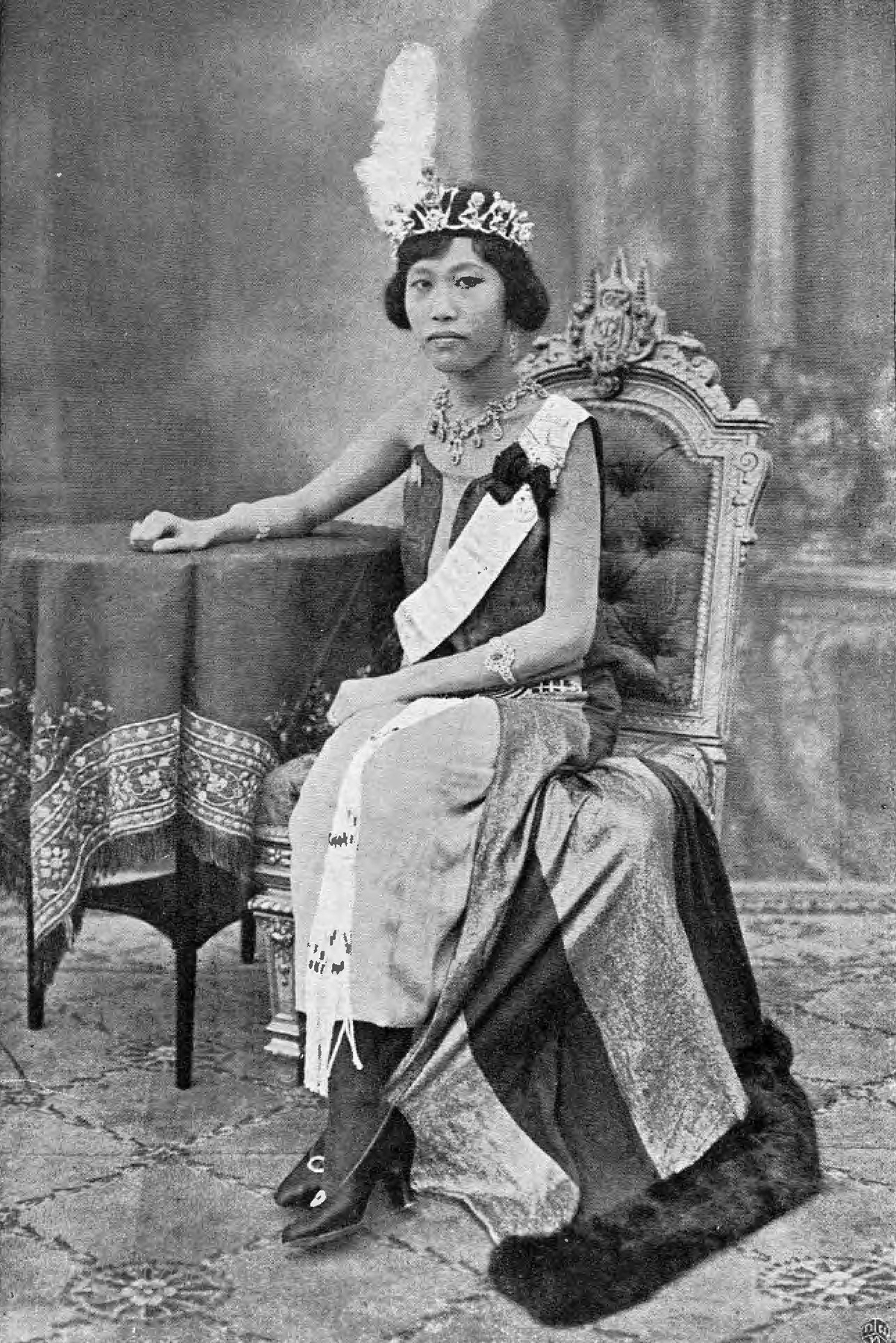

Princess consort of Siam
- Tenure: 11 October 1925 – 26 November 1925
- Born: Khrueakaeo Abhayavongsa; 15 April 1905; Bangkok, Siam
- Died: 10 October 1985 (aged 79); Bangkok, Thailand
- Spouse: Vajiravudh (Rama VI) (m. 1924; died 1925)
- Issue: Princess Bejaratana
- House: Abhayavongsa (Chakri dynasty)
- Father: Lueam Abhayavongsa
- Mother: Lek Bunnag
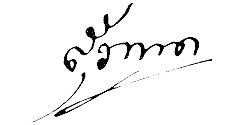
- Signature

Four wives of Vajiravudh
(by years of marriage)

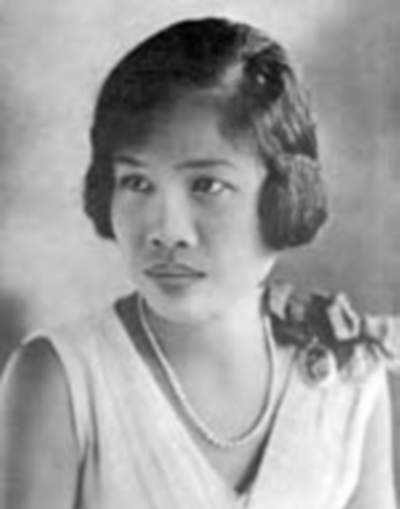
Sucharit Suda
(1921–1925)

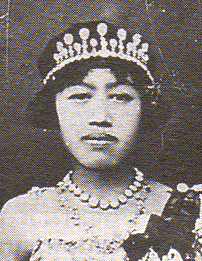
Indrasakdi Sachi
(1922–1925)

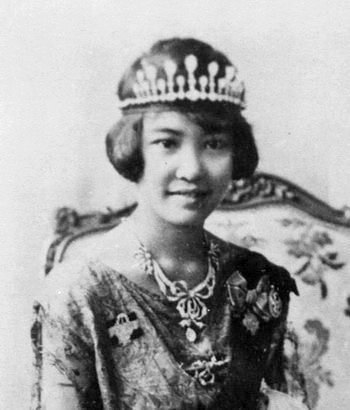
Lakshamilavan
(1922–1925)

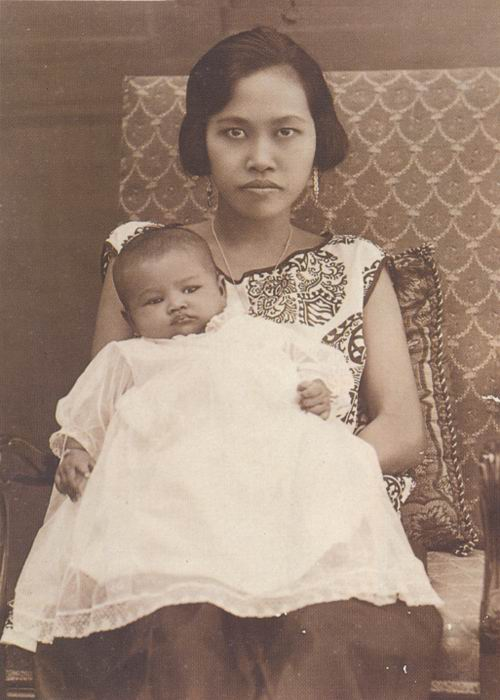
Suvadhana
(1924–1925)

Princess Suvadhana (Note: Thai: สุวัทนา; RTGS: Suwatthana) (15 April 1905 – 10 October 1985) was the royal consort of King Vajiravudh (or Rama VI) of Siam. Her original name was Khrueakaeo Abhayavongsa (Thai: เครือแก้ว อภัยวงศ์; RTGS: Khruea-kaeo Aphaiwong). She was born a commoner; her father was Lord Abhayabhupesa (Lueam Abhayavongsa) and her mother was Ms. Lek Bunnag.

== Life and marriage ==
Khrueakaeo first met King Vajiravudh in 1924 during a dramatic production, in which they both acted. Soon after, Khrueakaeo was renamed Suvadhana and elevated to the rank of a minor consort. Later that same year they were married at the Grand Palace in Bangkok. Although King Vajiravudh initiated many Siamese nationalistic policies of the 1920s, his queen Suvadhana was a daughter of the Thai governor of Phratabong province (Battambang). Suvadhana's grand aunt, Khun Chom Iem Busba, was the wife of King Norodom I of Cambodia.

When Suvadhana became pregnant in 1925, the King elevated her rank to that of Phra Nang Chao Suvadhana (HRH Princess Suvadhana, Princess Consort of Siam; Thai: พระนางเจ้าสุวัทนา พระวรราชเทวี) to preserve the rank of the royal child, who was going to be delivered, as Chao Fa with style of Royal Highness. Not soon after the King fell gravely ill, on the 25 November 1925, Suvadhana gave birth to a daughter, Princess Bejaratana Rajasuda who was the only child of the King.

== Exile in England ==
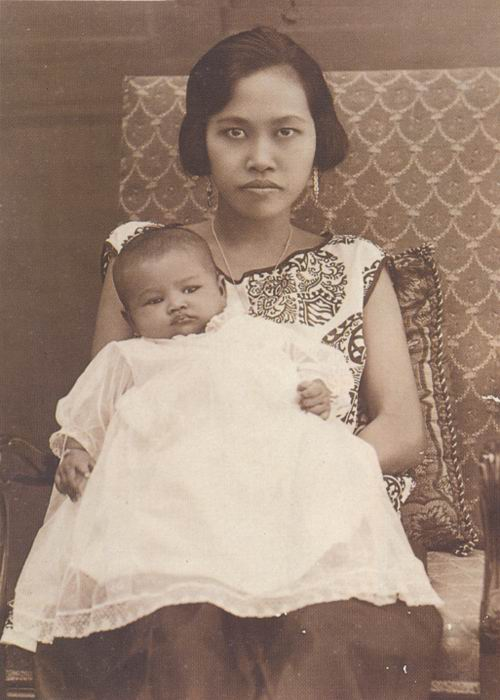
Suvadhana and Bejaratana Rajasuda in 1925

The Princess and her daughter continued to live at the Dusit Palace, raising her daughter during the reign of her husband's younger brother King Prajadhipok. In 1938, as war loomed, the Princess and her daughter emigrated to the United Kingdom, following the example of Prajadhipok who went in exile there in 1935. First she lived at Fairhill Villa in Camberley, Surrey, she later moved to Brighton. During the Second World War the Princess volunteered for the British Red Cross, donating winter clothes and other equipments to British soldiers; she later received a letter of recommendation from the organization. She would spend 22 years in England, she made her own living by investing in stocks and bonds; living a comfortable lifestyle with Thai servants.

== Return and later life ==
The Princess and her daughter returned to Thailand permanently in 1957. They bought some land on Sukhumvit Road Soi 38, and built the Ruenruedi Villa Palace. During her later years she carried out many royal duties and became patron of many charitable organizations. Suvadhana died at Siriraj Hospital on the 10 October 1985 at the age of 80, her funeral was presided over by King Bhumibol Adulyadej (or Rama IX) and Queen Sirikit.

== Honours ==
- The Most Illustrious Order of the Royal House of Chakri
- Dame Grand Cross (First Class) of The Most Illustrious Order of Chula Chom Klao
- Ratana Varabhorn Order of Merit
- King Rama VI Royal Cypher Medal (First Class)
- King Rama VII Royal Cypher Medal (Second Class)
- King Rama IX Royal Cypher Medal (First Class)
- The Red Cross Commendation Medal
