= List of Thai royal consorts =

This article lists the royal consorts of the monarchs of Thailand from the establishment of the Sukhothai Kingdom in 1238 through to the present day.

Queen Suthida is the current queen consort as the fourth wife of King Rama X

== Sukhothai Kingdom ==
=== Phra Ruang dynasty ===
| Name | Rank | Became consort | Ceased to be consort | Spouse | Notes |
|---|---|---|---|---|---|
| Phra Nang Suang | Chief | Unnamed | Unnamed | Si Inthrathit | |
| Phra Nang Saka | Chief | Unnamed | Unnamed | Maha Thammaracha I | |

== Ayutthaya Kingdom ==
=== Uthong dynasty ===
| Name | Rank | Became consort | Ceased to be consort | Spouse | Notes |
|---|---|---|---|---|---|
| Phummawadi Thewi | Chief | 1350 | 1369 | Uthong | |
| Unnamed | Chief | (1) 1369 (2) 1388 | (1) 1370 (2) 1395 | Ramesuan | |
| Unnamed | Chief | 1395 | 1409 | Ramrachathirat | |
| Sri Sudachan | Chief | 1548 | | Worawongsathirat | |

=== Suphannaphum dynasty ===
| Name | Rank | Became consort | Ceased to be consort | Spouse | Notes |
|---|---|---|---|---|---|
| Unnamed | Chief | 1370 | 1388 | Borommarachathirat I | |
| Queen of Sukhothai (Unnamed) | Queen consort | 1370 | 1388 | Borommarachathirat I | |
| None | | 1388 | | Thong Lan | |
| Unnamed | Chief | 1408 | 1424 | Intharacha | |
| Princess of Sukhothai (Unnamed) | Chief | 1408 | 1424 | Intharacha | |
| Princess of Sukhothai (Unnamed) | Chief | 1424 | 1448 | Borommarachathirat II | |
| Princess of Sukhothai (Unnamed) | Chief | 1448 | 1488 | Borommatrailokkanat | |
| Unnamed | Chief | 1488 | 1491 | Borommarachathirat III | |
| Suriyawongsa Thewi | Chief | 1491 | 1529 | Ramathibodi II | |
| Soi Thong | Left | | 1529 | Ramathibodi II | |
| Waenfa Thong | Noble consort | | 1529 | Ramathibodi II | |
| Unnamed | Chief | 1529 | 1533 | Borommarachathirat IV | |
| None | | 1533 | 1534 | Ratsadathirat | |
| Chittrawadi | Right | 1534 | | Chairachathirat | |
| Sri Sudachan | Left | 1534 | 1546 | Chairachathirat | |
| None | | 1546 | 1548 | Yotfa | |
| Suriyothai | | 1548 | 3 February 1548 | Maha Chakkraphat | |
| Rattana Mani Net | | | | Maha Chakkraphat | |
| Unknown | | (1) 18 February 1564 (2) 15 April 1569 | (1) 12 May 1568 (2) 2 August 1569 | Mahinthrathirat | |

=== Sukhothai dynasty ===
| Name | Rank | Became consort | Ceased to be consort | Spouse | Notes |
|---|---|---|---|---|---|
| Wisutkasat of Suphannaphum | Chief | 29 September 1569 | 30 June 1590 | Maha Thammaracha | |
| Mani Rattana | Chief | 30 June 1590 | 25 April 1605 | Naresuan | |
| Ek Kasattri of Cambodia | Chief | 1595 | 25 April 1605 | Naresuan | |
| Yadaya Mibaya of Lan Na (Toungoo) | Chief | 1596 | 25 April 1605 | Naresuan | |
| Sawatdi | Chief | 25 April 1605 | 1620 | Ekathotsarot | |
| Unnamed | Chief | 25 April 1605 | 1620 | Ekathotsarot | |
| Unnamed | Chief | 25 April 1605 | 1620 | Ekathotsarot | |
| Unnamed | Chief | 25 April 1605 | 1620 | Ekathotsarot | |
| Unnamed | Chief | 25 April 1605 | 1620 | Ekathotsarot | |
| Unnamed | Chief | 25 April 1605 | 1620 | Ekathotsarot | |
| Unnamed | Chief | 25 April 1605 | 1620 | Ekathotsarot | |
| Unnamed | Chief | 25 April 1605 | 1620 | Ekathotsarot | |
| None | | 1620 | | Si Saowaphak | |
| Chanthachaya | Chief | | | Songtham | |
| Khattiya Thewi | Chief | | | Songtham | |
| Ammarit | | | | Songtham | |
| None | | 1628 | 1629 | Chetthathirat | |
| None | | 1629 | | Athittayawong | |

=== Prasat Thong dynasty ===
| Name | Rank | Became consort | Ceased to be consort | Spouse | Notes |
|---|---|---|---|---|---|
| Pathuma Thewi or Prathuma | Right | 1629 | 1656 | Prasat Thong | |
| Suriya | Right | 1629 | 1656 | Prasat Thong | |
| Chantha Thewi | Right | 1629 | 1656 | Prasat Thong | |
| Siri Kanlaya | Right | 1629 | 1656 | Prasat Thong | |
| Ubon Thewi | Left | 1629 | 1656 | Prasat Thong | |
| Napha Thewi or Praphawadi | Left | 1629 | 1656 | Prasat Thong | |
| On Buttri or Wai Buttri | Left | 1629 | 1656 | Prasat Thong | |
| Kanittha Thewi | Left | 1629 | 1656 | Prasat Thong | |
| None | | 1656 | | Chai | |
| None | | 1656 | | Si Suthammaracha | |
| Kasattri | Right | 26 October 1656 | | Narai | |
| Unnamed Queen | Left | 26 October 1656 | 11 July 1688 | Narai | |
| Si Chulalak (Chaem) | Noble consort | 26 October 1656 | | Narai | |
| Ratchaya Thewi (Kusawadi of Chiang Mai) | Noble consort | | | Narai | |

=== Ban Phlu Luang dynasty ===
| Name | Rank | Became consort | Ceased to be consort | Spouse | Notes |
|---|---|---|---|---|---|
| Kan | Central | 1688 | 1703 | Phetracha | |
| Yothathip of Prasat Thong | Right | 1688 | 1703 | Phetracha | |
| Sudawadi of Prasat Thong | Left | 1688 | 1703 | Phetracha | |
| Unnamed Queen | Chief | 1703 | 1709 | Suriyenthrathibodi | |
| Rattana | Noble consort | 1703 | | Suriyenthrathibodi | |
| Kaeofa of Vientiane | left | 1703 | 1709 | Suriyenthrathibodi | |
| Rachanurak | Chief | 1709 | 1733 | Thai Sa | |
| Thapthim | Chief | 1709 | 1733 | Thai Sa | |
| Set | Chief | 1709 | 1733 | Thai Sa | |
| Iang | Princess consort | 1709 | 1733 | Thai Sa | |
| Aphainuchit | Right | 1733 | 1738 | Borommakot | |
| Phiphit Montri | Central | 1733 | 1758 | Borommakot | |
| Sangwan | Left | 1733 | 1755 | Borommakot | |
| Thao Toi | Chief | 1758 | | Uthumphon | |
| Wimonphat | Chief | 1758 | 7 April 1767 | Ekkathat | |

== Thonburi Kingdom ==
=== Thonburi dynasty ===
| Name | Rank | Became consort | Ceased to be consort | Spouse | Notes |
|---|---|---|---|---|---|
| Batboricha | Chief | 28 December 1768 | 6 April 1782 | Taksin | |
| Boricha Phakdi Si Sudarak | Left | 28 December 1768 | 6 April 1782 | Taksin | |

== Rattanakosin Kingdom ==
=== Chakri dynasty ===
| Portrait | Name | Title | Birth | Marriage | Became consort | Coronation | Ceased to be consort | Death | Tenure | Spouse |
|---|---|---|---|---|---|---|---|---|---|---|
| | Amarindra Nak | Thanphuying (not appointed) Queen (posthumously by Rama VI) | 15 March 1737 Daughter of Thong Na Bangxang and Rupsirisophak Mahanaknari | Around 1758–1761 | 6 April 1782 Spouse's enthronement by conquest | Not crowned | 7 September 1809 Spouse's death | 25 May 1826 89 years, 71 days | 27 years, 154 days | Phutthayotfa Chulalok |
| | Sri Suriyendra (posthumously by Rama IV) Bunrot | Princess (not appointed) Queen (posthumously by Rama VI) | 21 September 1767 Daughter of Ngoen Saetan and Princess Sri Sudarak | No Marriage | 8 September 1809 Monarch's first royal wife | Not crowned | 21 July 1824 Spouse's death | 18 October 1836 69 years, 21 days | 14 years, 317 days | Phutthaloetla Naphalai |
| | Kunthon Thipphayawadi | Princess (not appointed) | 1798 Daughter of Phutthayotfa Chulalok and Thongsuk | No Marriage | c. 1816 Monarch's second royal wife | Not crowned | 21 July 1824 Spouse's death | 16 February 1838 Approximately 39–40 years | — | Phutthaloetla Naphalai |
| Never appointed any concubines to be queen or princess consort | | | | | | | | | | Nangklao |
| | Somanass Waddhanawathy | Queen | 21 December 1834 Daughter of Prince Lakkhananukhun and Ngiu Suvarnadat | 2 January 1852 Marriage to the monarch | | Uncrowned | 10 October 1852 17 years, 294 days | | 282 days | Mongkut |
| | Debsirindra (posthumously by Rama V) Ramphoei Phamaraphirom | Princess consort (as Queen by Rama IV) Queen (posthumously by Rama VI) | 17 July 1834 Daughter of Prince Siriwong and Noi Siriwongse Na Ayudhaya | No Marriage | c. 1853 Appointed by the monarch | Not crowned | 9 September 1861 27 years, 54 days | | About 9 years | Mongkut |
| | Phannarai Chae Siriwong | Princess (not appointed) | 9 May 1838 Daughter of Prince Siriwong and Kim Saechio | No Marriage | c. 1853 Monarch's third royal wife | Not crowned | 1 October 1868 Spouse's death | 22 June 1914 76 years, 44 days | — | Mongkut |
| | Daksinajar | Princess (not appointed) | 18 September 1852 Daughter of Mongkut and Chan Suksathit | No Marriage | c. 1871 Monarch's first royal wife | Not crowned | 13 September 1906 53 years, 360 days | | — | Chulalongkorn |
| | Saovabhark Nariratana | Princess consort | 26 January 1856 Daughter of Ladavalya, Prince Bhumindra Bhakdi and Chin | No Marriage | c. 1872 Appointed by the monarch | Not crowned | 21 July 1887 31 years, 176 days | | About 15 years | Chulalongkorn |
| | Ubolratana Narinaga | Princess consort | 28 November 1846 Daughter of Ladavalya, Prince Bhumindra Bhakdi and Chin | No Marriage | c. 1872 Appointed by the monarch | Not crowned | 15 October 1901 54 years, 321 days | | About 29 years | Chulalongkorn |
| | Sukhumala Marasri | Princess consort Queen (promoted by Rama VII) | 10 May 1861 Daughter of Mongkut and Samli Bunnag | No Marriage | c. 1876 Appointed by the monarch | Not crowned | 23 October 1910 Spouse's death | 9 July 1927 64 years, 302 days | About 34 years | Chulalongkorn |
| | Sunanda Kumariratana | Princess consort Queen (posthumously by Rama V) | 10 November 1860 Daughter of Mongkut and Piam Sucharitakul | No Marriage | c. 1877 Appointed by the monarch | Not crowned | 31 May 1880 19 years, 203 days | | About 3 years | Chulalongkorn |
| | Sri Savarindira Savang Vadhana | Queen | 10 September 1862 Daughter of Mongkut and Piam Sucharitakul | No Marriage | c. 1877 Appointed by the monarch | Uncrowned | 23 October 1910 Spouse's death | 17 December 1955 93 years, 98 days | About 33 years | Chulalongkorn |
| | Sri Bajarindra Saovabha Phongsri | Queen regent | 1 January 1864 Daughter of Mongkut and Piam Sucharitakul | No Marriage | c. 1877 Appointed by the monarch | Uncrowned | 23 October 1910 Spouse's death | 20 October 1919 55 years, 292 days | About 33 years | Chulalongkorn |
| | Saisavali Bhiromya | Princess consort | 4 September 1862 Daughter of Ladavalya, Prince of Bhumindra Bhakdi and Chin | No Marriage | c. 1881 Appointed by the monarch | Not crowned | 23 October 1910 Spouse's death | 24 June 1929 66 years, 293 days | About 29 years | Chulalongkorn |
| | Dara Rasmi of Chiang Mai | Princess consort | 26 August 1873 Daughter of Inthawichayanon and Thip Keson | No Marriage | 12 February 1908 Elevated by the monarch | Not crowned | 23 October 1910 Spouse's death | 9 December 1933 60 years, 105 days | 2 years, 256 days | Chulalongkorn |
| | Indrasakdi Sachi Sucharitakul | Princess consort (1922–1923,1925) Queen (1923–1925, demoted by Rama VI) | 10 June 1902 Daughter of Pluem Sucharitakul and Kimlai Tejakambuja | 12 January 1922 | 10 June 1922 Elevated by the monarch | Uncrowned | 26 November 1925 Spouse's death | 30 November 1975 73 years, 173 days | 3 years, 169 days | Vajiravudh |
| | Lakshamilavan | Princess consort | 3 July 1899 Daughter of Vara Varnakara, Prince Narathip Praphanphong and Tat Montrikul (Tew) | No Marriage | 27 August 1922 Appointed by the monarch | Not crowned | 26 November 1925 Spouse's death | 29 August 1961 62 years, 57 days | 3 years, 91 days | Vajiravudh |
| | Suvadhana Abhayavongsa | Princess consort (as Queen by Rama VI) | 15 April 1905 Daughter of Lueam Abhayavongsa and Lek Bunnag | 10 August 1924 | 11 October 1925 Elevated by the monarch | Not crowned | 26 November 1925 Spouse's death | 10 October 1985 80 years, 178 days | 1 year, 108 days | Vajiravudh |
| | Rambai Barni | Queen | 20 December 1904 Daughter of Svasti Sobhana, Prince Svastivatana Visishtha and Abha Barni Gagananga | 26 August 1918 | 26 November 1925 Elevated by the monarch | 25 February 1926 | 2 March 1935 Spouse's abdication | 22 May 1984 79 years, 154 days | 9 years, 96 days | Prajadhipok |
| Never married | | | | | | | | | | Ananda Mahidol |
| | Sirikit Kitiyakara | Queen regent | 12 August 1932 Daughter of Nakkhatra Mangala, Prince of Chanthaburi II and Bua Sanidvongs | 28 April 1950 Marriage to the monarch | | 5 May 1950 | 13 October 2016 Spouse's death | 24 October 2025 93 years, 73 days | 66 years, 168 days | Bhumibol Adulyadej |
| | Suthida Tidjai | Queen | 3 June 1978 Daughter of Kham Tidjai and Jangheang Tidjai | 1 May 2019 Marriage to the monarch | | 4 May 2019 | Incumbent Age: 48 years, 131 days | Living | 7 years, 165 days | Vajiralongkorn |
