= Order of Ramkeerati =

Thai decoration for services to Scouting

Order of Symbolic Propitiousness Ramkeerati เครื่องราชอิสริยาภรณ์อันเป็นสิริยิ่งรามกีรติ ลูกเสือสดุดีชั้นพิเศษ
- Pendant of the order, the decoration consists of a single class, and is worn on the neck.

Awarded by the King of Thailand
- Type: Order for scouting
- Established: 26 November 1987
- Eligibility: People who awarded First Class of Boy Scout Citation Medal of Vajira over 5 years
- Awarded for: People who devoted their lives in service to the Scouting Movement in Thailand
- Status: Currently constituted
- Founder: HM King Bhumibol Adulyadej
- Sovereign: HM King Vajiralongkorn
- Grades: 1

Statistics
- First induction: 10 June 1988
- Last induction: 25 June 2022
- Total inductees: 248

Precedence
- Next (higher): Vallabhabhorn Order
- Next (lower): Vajira Mala Order
- Ribbon bar of the Order of Symbolic Propitiousness Ramkeerati.

The Order of Symbolic Propitiousness Ramkeerati (Special Class) - Boy Scout Citation Medal (Thai: เครื่องราชอิสริยาภรณ์อันเป็นสิริยิ่งรามกีรติ ลูกเสือสดุดีชั้นพิเศษ) is established on 26 November 1987 (B.E. 2530) by King Rama IX of Thailand to be bestowed onto those who have rendered constant service and support to Boy Scout activities for at least five consecutive years. Recipients must have received the Boy Scout Citation Medal of Vajira (First Class). Members of the order have no post-nominal entitlement.

Ram Keerati meaning "Glory/Fame of Rama".

== Insignia ==
The decoration consists of a single class, and is worn on the neck. The pendant of the Order is oval shaped, 2.5 cm wide, and 3.5 cm tall. The obverse has a silver face of a tiger and trident on a blue enamel background, surrounded by a gold and silver ray design. The pendant hangs from the ribbon via a gold Thai crown. The reverse is gold, with a crown over the logo of the World Scout movement.
