= Vajiravudh =

King of Siam from 1910 to 1925

Vajiravudh; วชิราวุธ
- King Rama VI
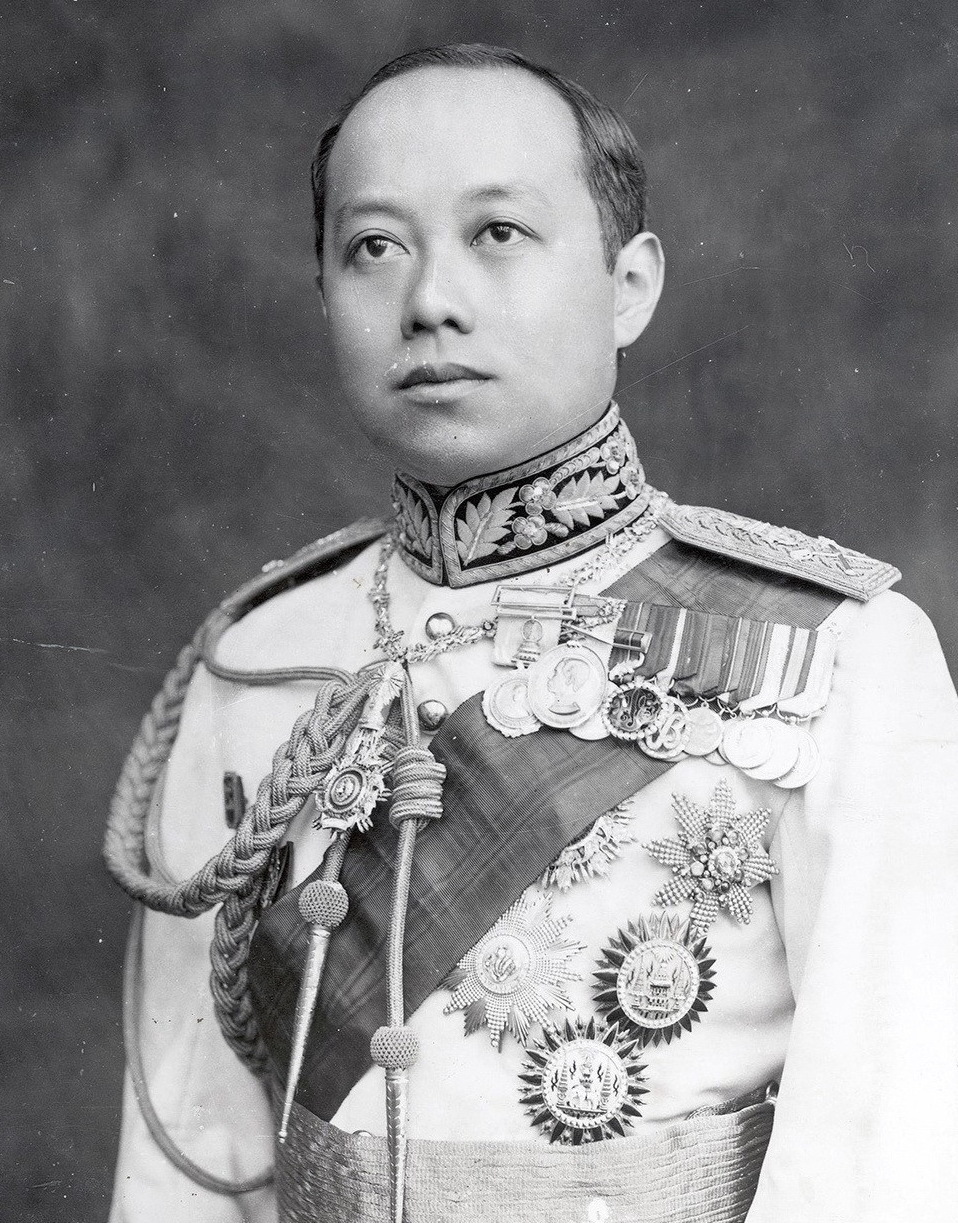
- Formal portrait, c. 1920

King of Siam
- Reign: 23 October 1910 – 26 November 1925
- Coronations: 11 November 1910; 28 November 1911
- Predecessor: Chulalongkorn (Rama V)
- Successor: Prajadhipok (Rama VII)
- Regent: Prajadhipok (1925)

Regent of Siam
- Regency: 27 March 1907 – 17 November 1907
- Monarch: Chulalongkorn (Rama V)
- Born: 1 January 1880; Bangkok, Siam
- Died: 26 November 1925 (aged 45); Bangkok, Siam
- Spouses: Prueang Sucharitakul; Praphai Sucharitakul; Wanphimon Worawan; Khrueakaeo Abhayavongsa
- Issue: Princess Bejaratana
- Dynasty: Chakri
- Father: Chulalongkorn (Rama V)
- Mother: Saovabha Phongsri
- Religion: Theravada Buddhism
- Education: Royal Military College, Sandhurst; Christ Church, Oxford (attended)
- Military career
- Allegiance: United Kingdom of Great Britain and Ireland
- Branch: Durham Light Infantry, British Army
- Service years: 1898–
- Rank: Captain; Honorary General

Vajiravudh (Note: Thai: วชิราวุธ; RTGS: Wachirawut) (1 January 1880 – 26 November 1925) was the sixth king of Siam from the Chakri dynasty, titled Rama VI. He reigned from 1910 until his death in 1925. King Vajiravudh is best known for his efforts to create and promote Siamese nationalism. His reign was characterized by Siam's further Westernization, minimal participation in World War I, and lavish spending on arts and culture. He had keen interests in Siamese history, archaeology, and literature, as well as economics, politics and world affairs, and founded the country's first university, Chulalongkorn University.

== Education ==
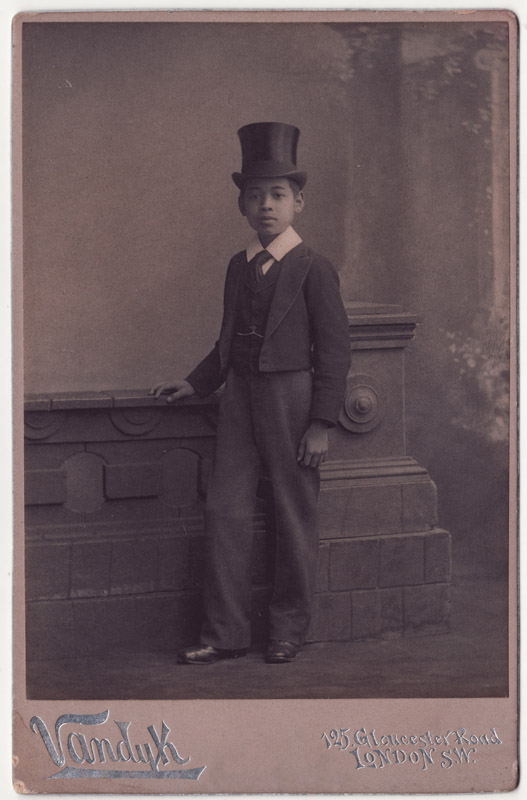
Portrait while Vajiravudh studying in England

Vajiravudh was born on 1 January 1880 to Chulalongkorn and one of his four queens and half sister Saovabha Phongsri. Also in 1888, Vajiravudh began suffering from a severe illness and was brought to Ko Sichang by his father to recover.

Prince Vajiravudh was first educated in the royal palace in Thai and English. His full siblings were Bahurada Manimaya, Tribejrutama Dhamrong, Chakrabongse Bhuvanath, Siriraj Kakudhabhand, Asdang Dejavudh, Chudadhuj Dharadilok and Prajadhipok, who succeeded him as King Rama VII. In late 1893, his father, Rama V, sent Vajiravudh and his half-brother Abhakara Kiartivongse to study military science in Britain. The king's decision was motivated by the recent 1893 Franco-Siamese crisis, and his consequent desire to modernise Siam's army and navy.

In January 1895, his half-brother Crown Prince Vajirunhis died, and Vajiravudh was appointed the new Crown Prince of Siam. Vajiravudh and Abhakara continued their studies in Ascot under the tutelage of Sir Basil Thomson. In 1895, Vajiravudh began his education in Britain at the Royal Military College, Sandhurst and by 1898 was commissioned as a captain in the Durham Light Infantry, which he served with for three months of exercises in the south of England upon graduation. He studied law and history at Christ Church, Oxford in 1899, where, coming from a royal household, he was a member of the exclusive Bullingdon Club. However, he suffered from appendicitis, which barred him from graduating in 1901. He visited other European countries while he lived in England, including Belgium where he inspected Blegny fort. He went to Berlin in May 1902 and Copenhagen in September 1902. He attended the 15 May 1902 enthronement ceremonies for King Alfonso XIII of Spain in Madrid. On behalf of his father, King Chulalongkorn, he attended the coronation of King Edward VII on 9 August 1902.

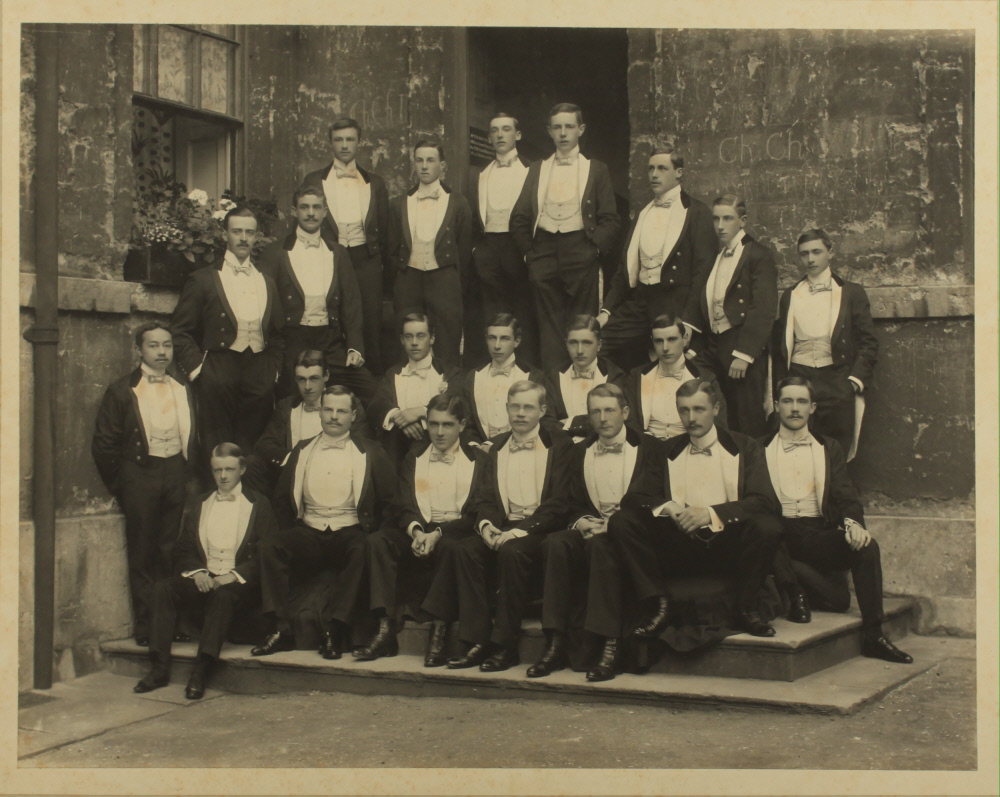
Members of the Bullingdon Club in 1900, with Vajiravudh standing at the far left

Crown Prince Vajiravudh left England in October 1902 and returned to Siam in January 1903, traveling via US and Japan.

Chulalongkorn died on 23 October 1910, and Vajiravudh succeeded his father as king of Siam.

== Accession and early reforms ==
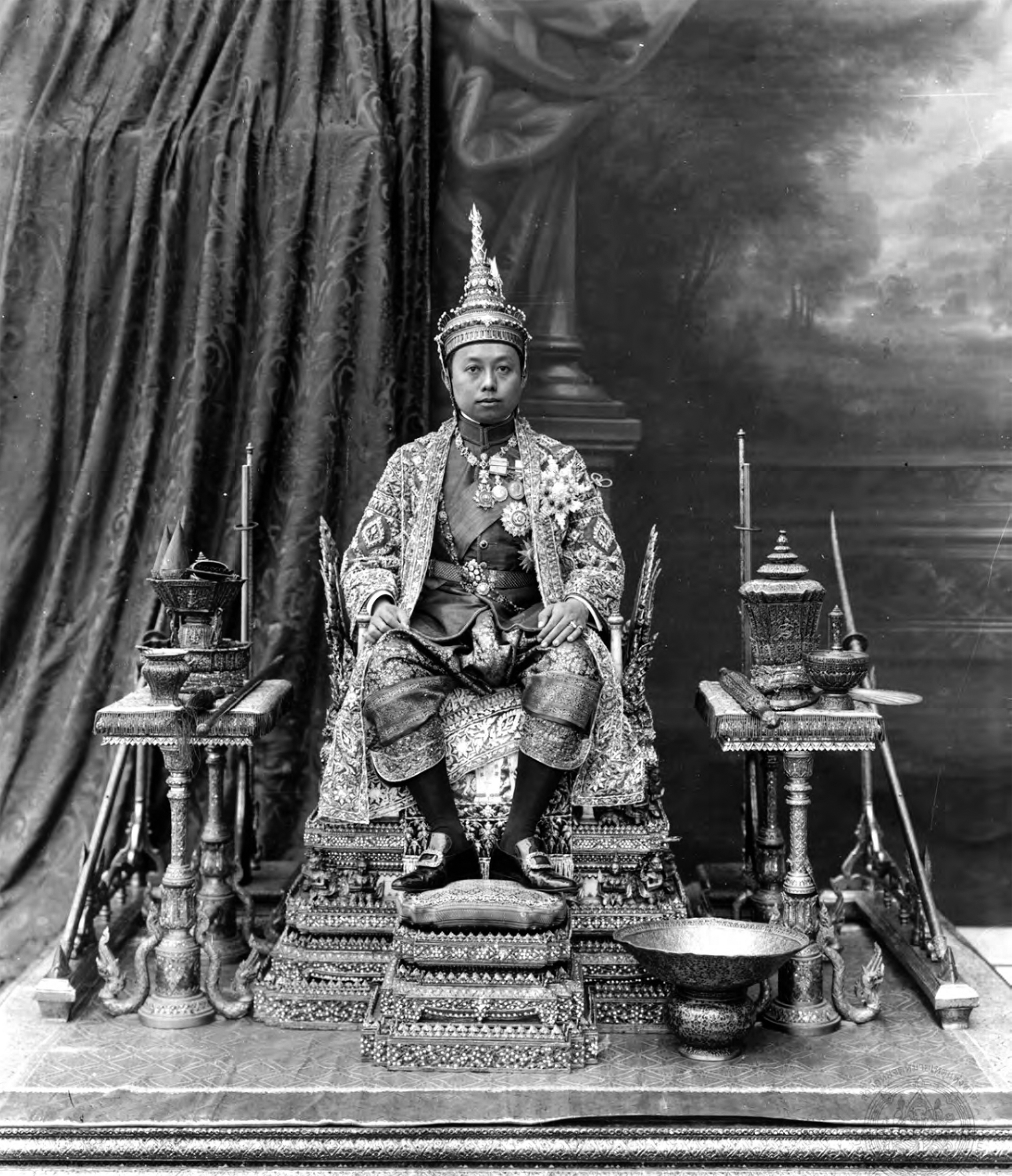
King Vajiravudh's coronation portrait, 1911

Even before his coronation, Vajiravudh initiated several reforms. He organized Siam's defence and established military academies. He created the rank of "general" for the first time in Siam, with his uncle, Prince Bhanurangsi Savangwongse as the first Siamese Field Marshal. On 11 November 1910, Vajiravudh underwent a provisional coronation ceremony, with a more lavish one planned for after the funerary rites of his father were complete.

His first act following his accession to the throne was to build the Royal Pages College, subsequently renamed Vajiravudh College by King Prajadhipok to honour his brother. It was built as an all-boy's boarding school in the same tradition as English public schools such as Eton and Harrow. The school was built instead of a royal monastery, formerly a custom of Thai kings, as King Vajiravudh deemed that there were already too many temples in Bangkok. In his own hand written letter, King Vajiravudh wrote that "In the Royal Pages College, what I want is not so much to turn out model boys, all of the same standard, all brilliant scholars with thousands of marks each, as to turn out efficient young men— young men who will be physically and morally clean, and who will be looking forward keenly to take up whatever burden the future of our state may lay upon them". Later he also raised the Civil Servant School to "Chulalongkorn Academy for Civil Officials", then Chulalongkorn University. Both Vajiravudh College and Chulalongkorn University still benefit from the funds that King Vajiravudh set aside for the use of the two elite institutions. He also improved Siamese healthcare systems and set up some of the earliest public hospitals in Siam, Vajira Hospital in 1912 and Chulalongkorn Hospital in 1914.

In 1911, he established the Wild Tiger Corps [เสือป่า]) a para-military corp outside of the established military hierarchy. Initially a ceremonial guard, it became a military force of 4,000 within its first year and consumed much of the King's time and energy. It became the source of deep dissatisfaction between the army and the King. A branch for children was also established known as (ลูกเสือ Tiger Cubs) which became the Boy Scouts.

On 28 November 1911 Vajiravudh's second and formal coronation was held with visiting royals from Europe and Japan as guests, a first for Siam, which festivities took 13 days. Later that year, the first airplane was flown in Siam.

The early years of Vajiravudh's administration were largely dominated by his two uncles, Prince Damrong and Prince Devawongse, both of them Chulalongkorn's right-hand men. However, the king disagreed with Prince Damrong, Minister of Interior, over Damrong's negotiation of the Anglo-Siamese Treaty of 1909 that ceded four sultanates to the British Empire.

Vajiravudh reformed his father's monthon system by creating the "paks" (Thai: ภาค) or "regions" over the administrative monthons. Each pak was governed by an Uparaja (viceroy) directly responsible to the king. The Uparaja presided over the intendants of monthons in the region—thus concentrating local administrative powers in his hands—much to the dismay of Prince Damrong.

== Attempted coup ==
Monarchs of the Chakri dynasty
- Phutthayotfa Chulalok (Rama I)
- Phutthaloetla Naphalai (Rama II)
- Nangklao (Rama III)
- Mongkut (Rama IV)
- Chulalongkorn (Rama V)
- Vajiravudh (Rama VI)
- Prajadhipok (Rama VII)
- Ananda Mahidol (Rama VIII)
- Bhumibol Adulyadej (Rama IX)
- Vajiralongkorn (Rama X)

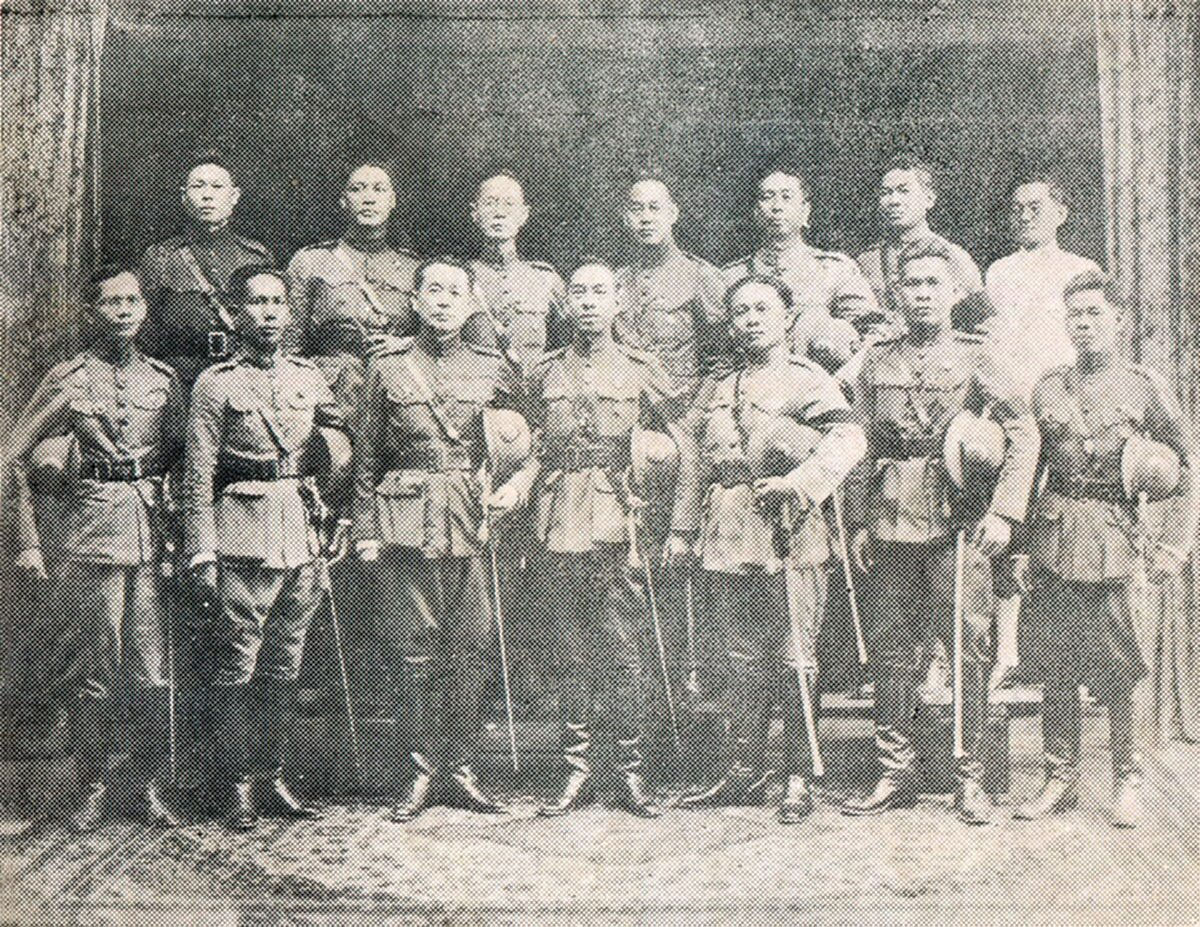
Photograph of Palace Revolt of 1912 key plotters

Radicals expected a new constitution upon the coronation of Vajiravudh. However, no constitution was forthcoming. In 1911, the Wuchang Uprising that led to the fall of Qing dynasty prompted Siamese radicals to act. For the first time in Siam, an attempt was made to overthrow the monarchy and establish democracy.

The immediate cause, however, occurred even before Vajiravudh's coronation. In 1909, Crown Prince Vajiravudh ordered a Thai Royal Military Academy student who had had an argument with one of Vajiravudh's pages to be caned. Academy alumni were further provoked by Vajiravudh's creation of the Wild Tiger Corps, seen by the army as a threat to their prerogatives.

The plotters were relatively young army and naval officers who had been students during the 1909 incident. The coup was planned for 1 April—the traditional Siamese New Year's Day. They planned to elevate one of Vajiravudh's half brothers, Prince Raphi Phatthanasak, to be the first president of Siam. They believed that, if the absolute monarchy were removed, Siam would achieve modernization as in Japan under Emperor Taishō. The coup leaders accused the king of devoting his time to writing and acting in theatrical plays with his companions at the expense of the country governance. They also accused him of living a luxurious Western-style life, building Sanam Chandra Palace and Lumphini Park, and owning expensive horses from Australia, while preaching austerity and nationalism to his subjects. The counter-argument is that the assertions were political and his developments were for the good of the state, in terms of impressing visiting dignitaries, or developing assets for the nation. In 1925, Vajiravudh donated Lumphini Park, originally an exhibition ground on royal land, to the public in 1925 at his own expense.

The coup plan was leaked. Captain Yut Kongyu, who was selected as the assassin by lottery, told Mom Chao Prawatpan, and then Prince Chakrabongse, of the intended coup. Prince Chakrabongse arrested all the conspirators. Their sentences were severe, ranging from execution to long-term imprisonment. However, Vajiravudh commuted the death sentence and released a number of the plotters, citing their youth and family background.

== Administration, economy, infrastructure ==
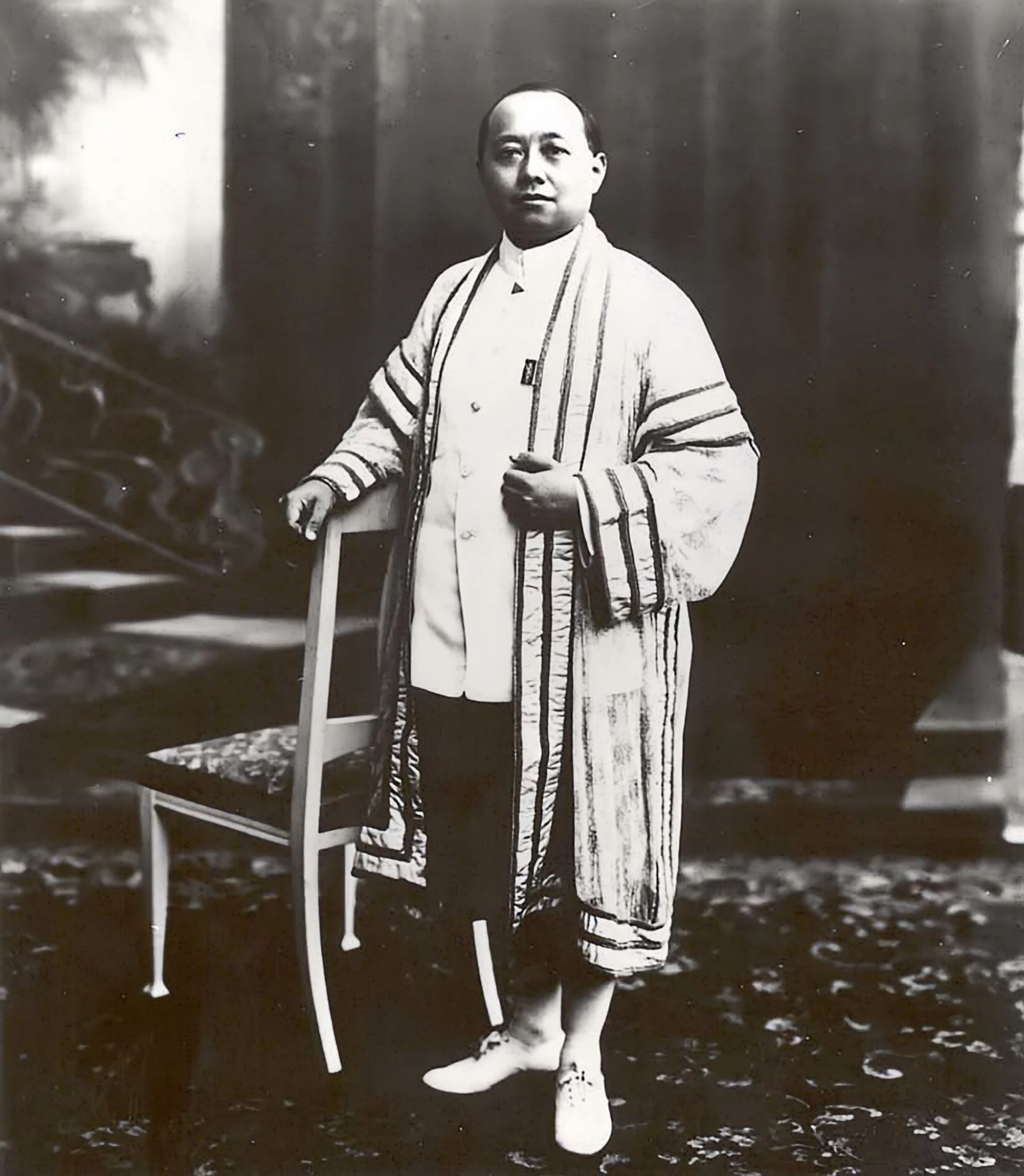
King Vajiravudh wearing the khrui of a barrister

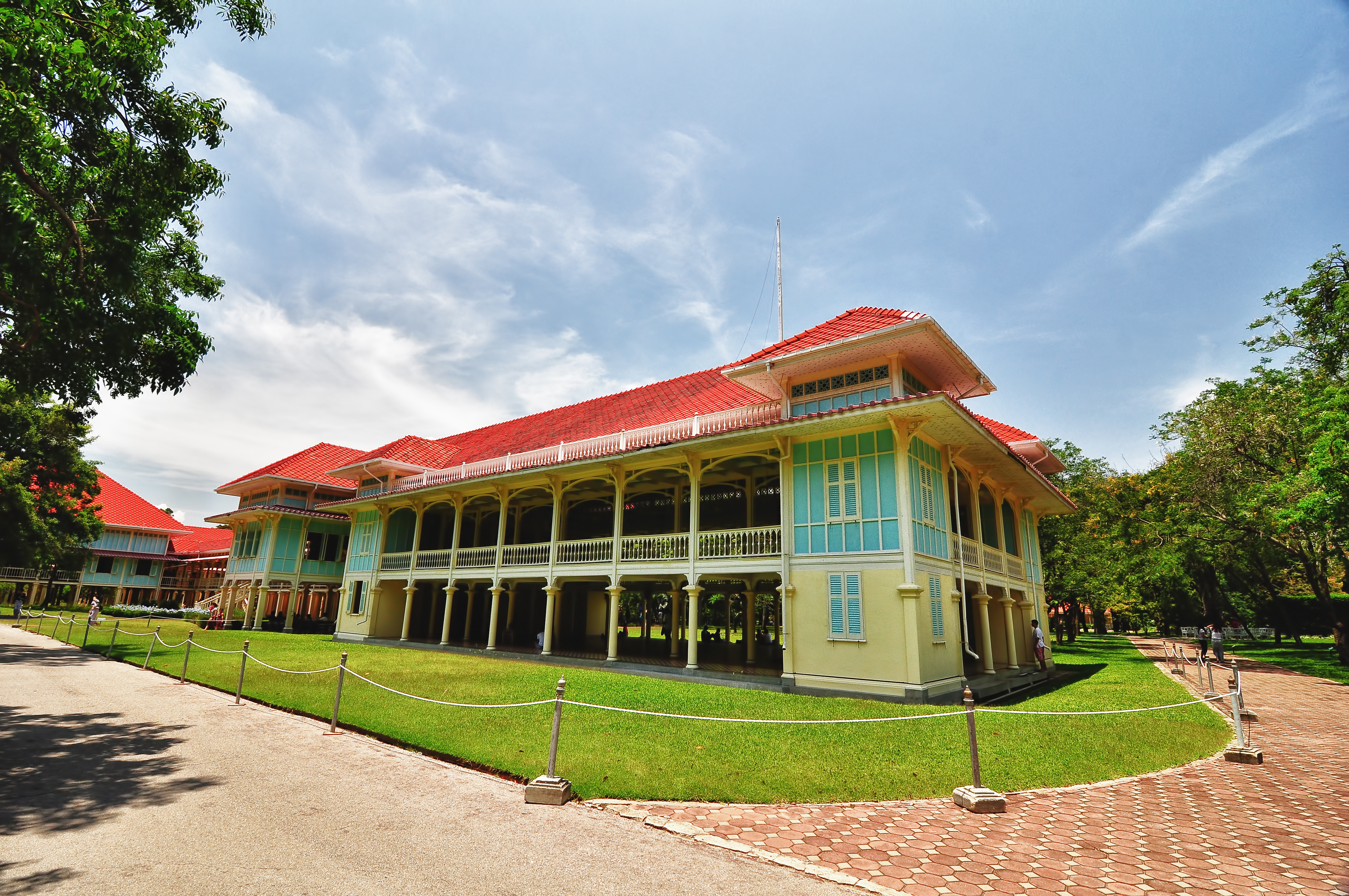
Mrigadayavan Palace

Rama VI inherited his father's plan of building a modern nation although he was more skeptical of outside methods. Disagreements occurred incessantly with "old aristocrats", many of whom were his relatives such as the celebrated Prince Damrong, his uncle, who took charge of the Ministry of Interior. As more and more corruption in the newly created provinces was reported, Rama VI created a viceroy system. Viceroys, appointed directly by the king, were sent to supervise provincial governors and local officials.

In 1912, Vajiravudh announced the change in the solar calendar era from the Rattanakosin Era (R.S.) designated by Chulalongkorn to the Buddhist Era with the year beginning 1 April 2455 BE (1912 CE).

In 1913, Siam faced a financial crisis as the Chinese-Siamese Bank went bankrupt.

In 1914, Vajiravudh, having determined that the act providing for the invocation of martial law, first promulgated by his father in 1907, was not consistent with modern laws of war nor convenient for the preservation of the external or internal security of the state, changed to the modern form that, with minor amendments, continues in force.

Also in 1914, the construction of Don Mueang Airport began. In the same year the Siamese government borrowed from the Federated Malay States to extend railways to the south. In 1915, Vajiravudh himself visited the southern provinces to oversee railway construction. The Bangkok railway station at Hua Lamphong was then established as a center of Siamese railroads. Prince Damrong eventually left the Ministry of Interior in 1915. In 1916, Vajiravudh appointed his half-brother, Prince of Kamphang Phet, as the Head of the Railway Department.

The king continued his father's rice varieties competition. He also continued the overall royal encouragement of development of rice varieties, founding the Rangsit Rice Experiment Station in 1916 (now called Pathum Thani Rice Research Center and run by the Ministry of Agriculture).

In 1917, Vajiravudh established the Nakorn Sri Thammarat Regiment as his personal guard. In the same year Vajiravudh founded Chulalongkorn University, the first university in Siam, named in honor of his father. In 1918, Vajiravudh founded the Dusit Thani near Dusit Palace as an experimental site for democracy. The democratic institutions were imitated including elections, parliament, and the press. Vajiravudh himself acted as one of the citizens of Dusit Thani, yet the city was criticized by others as another of Vajiravudh's theatrical conceits.

During 1918–1919 the price of rice soared. The government faced public criticism due to its tepid response. The major cause of the problem was the hoarding of rice. Chinese millers and rice merchants bought huge amounts of rice from farmers for export to Singapore, the largest rice market in the region. Price speculation was rampant. The government imposed a ban on rice exports. At the same time, public servants asked for higher wages due to the rising cost of living. The public, mainly the urban "middle-class", and Chinese traders became more and more unhappy with the government.

In 1923, Vajiravudh commissioned the construction of Mrigadayavan Palace to serve as a holiday villa. He appointed Ercole Manfredi as the chief architect and Chaophraya Yommarat to supervise construction. The palace consisted of sixteen teak buildings raised on concrete pillars and linked together by a series of walkways; construction took place during 1923–1924. Vajiravudh also issued a proclamation declaring the surrounding area a wildlife refuge.

== World War I and Siamese nationalism ==
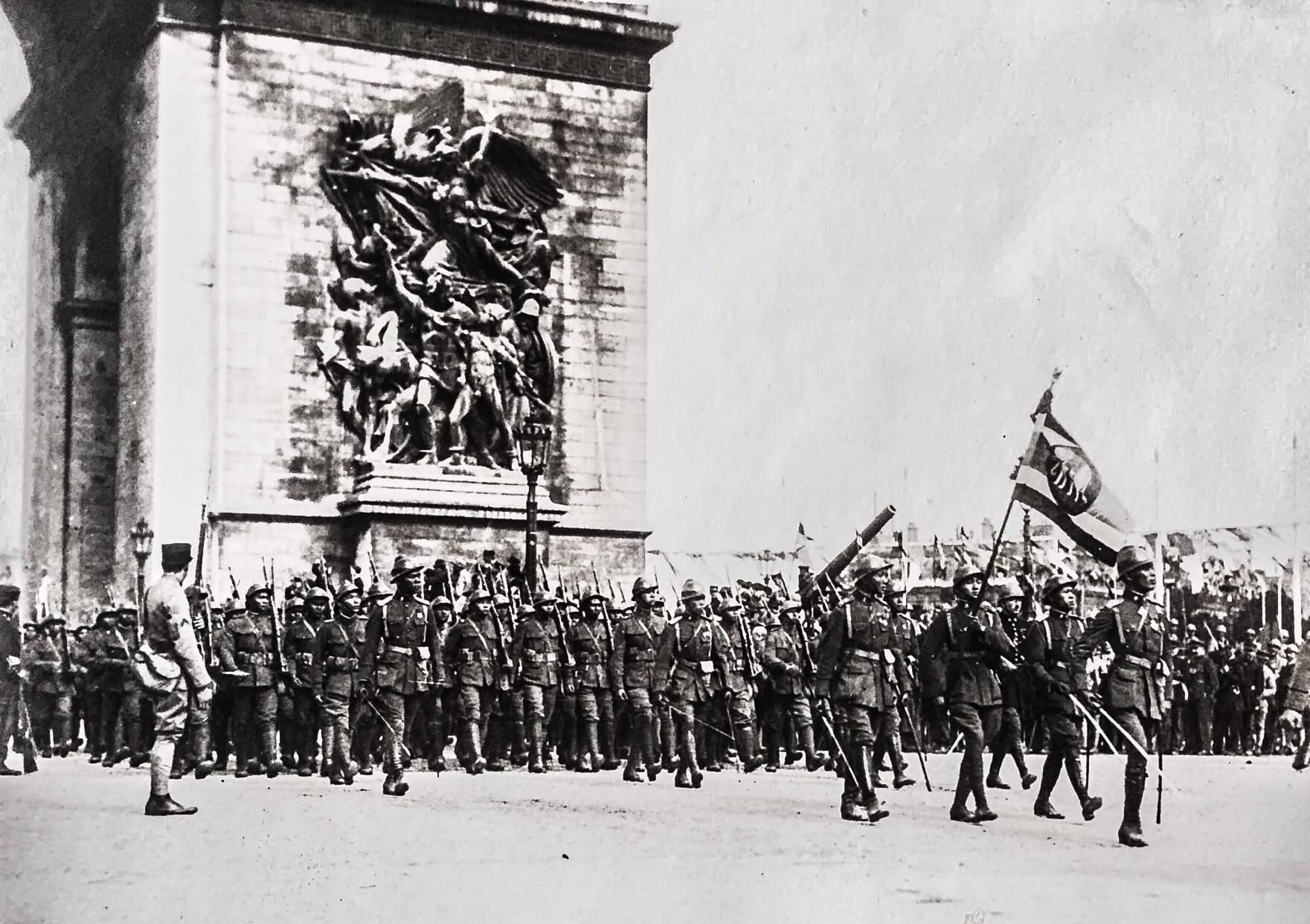
The Siamese Expeditionary Force with the tricolor flag of Siam in Paris, 1919

On 22 July 1917 Vajiravudh declared war on Germany and Austria-Hungary. He aligned Siam with the Allied Powers and expelled German and Austrian officials from the Railway Department and Siam Commercial Bank. He also put the properties of the Central Powers under a Siamese government protectorate. Vajiravudh saw the war as an opportunity to create and promote Siamese nationalism. He changed the flag of Siam from the elephant banner to the tricolor banner. King Vajiravudh is considered by some writers to be the father of Thai nationalism, which was later built upon by Field Marshal Phibunsongkhram and Sarit Thanarat. The alternative view is that the idea of nationalism by Rama VI was a later political construct. Prince Chula Chakrabongse classified him as a liberal.

Vajiravudh wrote a letter (held in the Gloucestershire Archives, England) to his friend Maynard Colchester Wemyss setting out his reasons for going to war, dated 18 September 1917. Wemyss was guardian to King Bhumipol's father and two of his brothers. Vajiravudh described the presence of Imperial German spy activity in Bangkok, allying with business groups for economic arrangements after a German take-over of Siam. Wemyss and the King also corresponded about Kaiser Wilhelm II's Asian aggression, on atrocities involving the Kaiser's army in Belgium (the Rape of Belgium) and the killing of British civilians by naval bombardment during the raid on Scarborough, Hartlepool and Whitby. In 1921, Rama VI wrote to Wemyss that in avoiding the "German militaristic spirit . . . Thai people had been protected as free minds". Vajiravudh introduced the practice of using the name Rama for the Chakri kings in deference to the dynasty and following western practice, being then himself Rama VI.

Other than 140,000 Vietnamese colonial troops and workers drafted by the French, Siamese troops were the only Southeast Asians in the European theatre of World War I. However, the Siamese troops did not see much action, as they arrived in Europe towards the end of the war. Participation in the war allowed Siam to later negotiate with the Western powers as a partner, albeit a junior one. Although the Siamese pilots who trained in France did not see combat because the war ended, Siam's participation in the First World war led to the founding of the Royal Thai Airforce and the airborne postal service. The Royal Siamese Transport Corps (Ror Yor) and Medical Corps did see front line action, but not in combat. Nineteen soldiers died, some in accidents, but mainly from the Spanish Flu.

== Financial crisis ==
In 1917, the price of silver rose and exceeded the face value of silver coins. The coins were then melted down and sold. The government solved this by changing the pure silver coin to alloy. Vajiravudh eventually forbade exports of Siamese coins. In 1918, the usage of 1-baht coins was nullified and 1-baht banknotes were introduced. Coins were recalled and kept as a national reserve. In 1919, Vajuravudh imposed a military-exemptation tax (Thai: เงินรัชชูปการ) nationwide including on the royal members. As the need for huge capital increased, a new bank, later known as the "Government Savings Bank", was founded in 1923.

Though the Siamese forces that joined the march at Versailles returned triumphant in 1919, the worldwide economic problems caused by World War I were serious. In the same year, drought hit Siam and rice shortages ensued. The government forbade the export of rice, the main Siamese export since the Bowring Treaty. Queen Mother Saovabha, Vajiravudh's mother, died in 1919. Siamese participation in World War I opened the way to reconciliation, first with the United States in 1920, then to redress the unequal treaties imposed by Western powers in the 19th century.

In spite of the financial crisis, railway constructions continued. The railway reached Narathiwat and was expanded north and east. The construction of the Rama VI Bridge carrying the railway over the Chao Phraya River in Bangkok began in 1922 and the same year the railway reached Chiang Mai. However, the treasury was in such straits that a large loan from Britain was negotiated. Also in 1922, an insurgency occurred in Pattani over new taxation policies. It was readily suppressed by the Nakorn Sri Thammarat Regiment. In 1923, Vajiravudh announced his six principles in the governance of Pattani Province, emphasizing local freedom and tax measures.

== Personal life ==
=== Vajiravudh as a writer ===
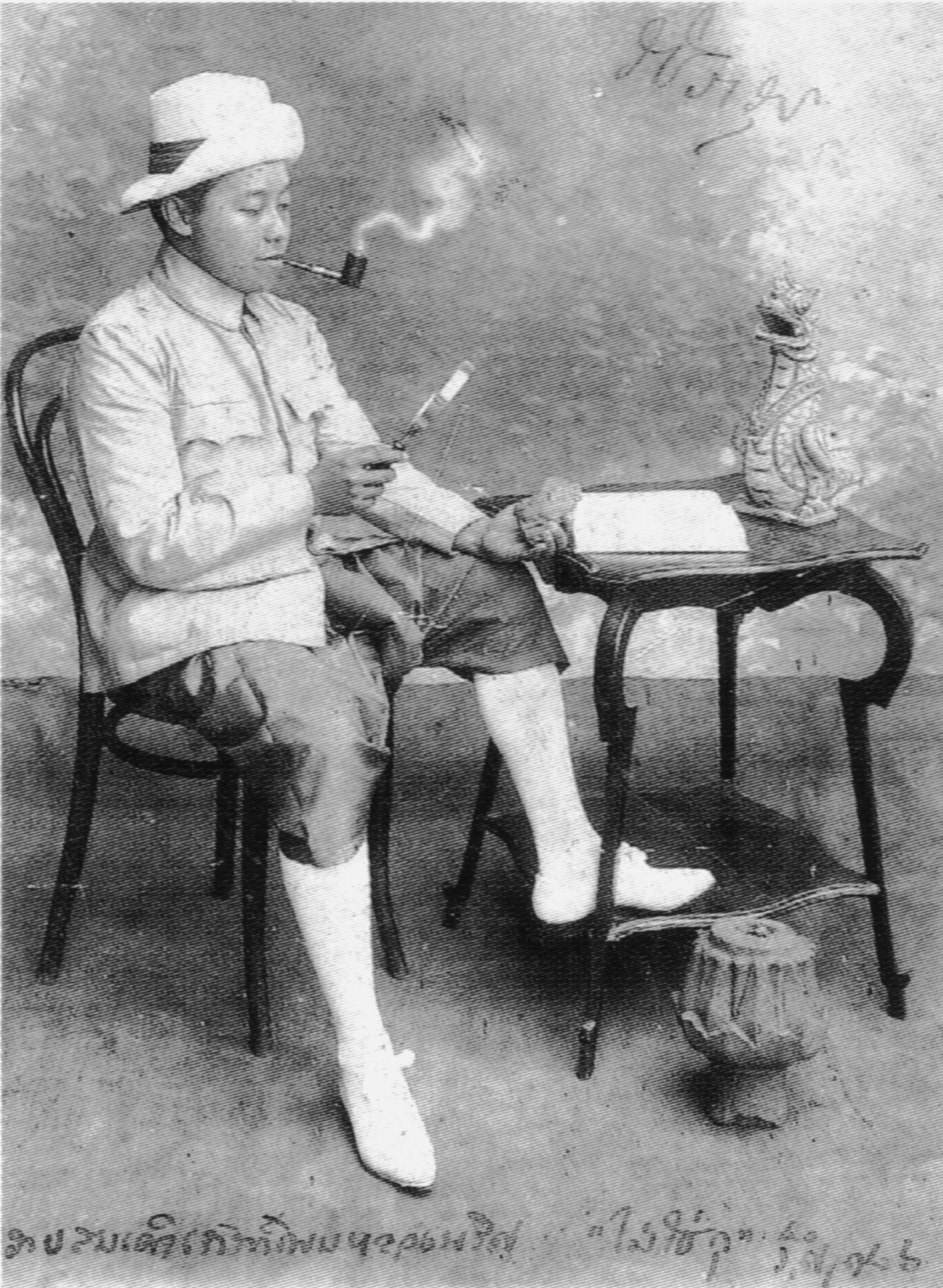
Vajiravudh in inspecting a Sukhothai-era Buddha1907 with a naga and a lotus finial. He handwrote the caption classifying the Buddha and signed the photo at top right

Vajiravudh was one of Thailand's most highly renowned artists, writing modern novels, short stories, newspaper articles, poems, plays, and journals. He translated many works of English and French literature into Thai, Among his works were translations of three Shakespeare plays: The Merchant of Venice, As You Like It, and Romeo and Juliet. He wrote many other pieces promoting Thai nationalism, one of his nationalistic works is "The Honour of Tiger Soldier" (Thai: เกียรติศักดิ์ทหารเสือ) based on ancient French chivalric rhyme "Mon âme à Dieu, Ma vie au Roi, Mon cœur aux Dames, L'honneur pour moi", and might also be influenced by Alexandre Dumas's The Three Musketeers. Vajiravudh also composed nonfiction such as “The War of Polish Succession”, which he wrote while he was Crown Prince (see also external links below).

The king introduced mysteries and detective stories to the Thai reading public. He translated Agatha Christie's Hercule Poirot novels into Thai, and created the character "Nai Thong-In" (Thai: นักสืบนายทองอิน) as a Siamese consulting detective, using Sir Arthur Conan Doyle's Sherlock Holmes and Edgar Allan Poe's Dupin as an archetypes. He translated Sax Rohmer's The Golden Scorpion.

The king was well-versed in Sanskrit and Hindu literature, including the Ramayana and the Mahabharata epics. He translated many stories from the two epics into Thai and also wrote plays inspired by Hindu literature. He was influenced by Rama, the incarnation of Vishnu and hero of the Ramayana epic, to the extent that he systemized and promoted the use of the name Rama as the (English) reign names of all Thai kings of the Bangkok (Rattanakosin) era. His own reign was dubbed as "Rama VI". (See Rama (Kings of Thailand))

As a homage to his great, great, great-grandfather, Tao Sên-pom, King Vajiravudh published a fictional play in Thai, based on the Prince and designed for performance with musical accompaniment in 1913. Prince Sên-pom was the father of Chao Praya Chakri, Rama I. The drama centres on a tale of Siamese courtly romance. It is absorbing fun and well-written. A copy of the play was given as a present to the Armstrong family in Cragside House, Rothbury, where it remains in the library. On a trip to the English Lake District, Vajiravudh directed the performance of a play at the Stonehenge-like setting of Castlerigg Stone Circle, in the mountains near Keswick.

In 1914 Vajiravudh published in a Thai newspaper an article titled "Jews of the Orient" (Thai: ยิวแห่งบูรพาทิศ). Vajiravudh explicitly adopted Western antisemitic tropes and applied them to Chinese in Siam. The essay was written in the context of a recent strike by Chinese merchants and workers which had paralyzed Bangkok, and may also have been the product of Vajiravudh's exposure to European anti-Semitism. The article described Chinese immigrants in Thailand as having excessive "racial loyalty and astuteness in financial matters." The king wrote, "Money is their God. Life itself is of little value compared with the leanest bank account."

=== Marriages ===
Vajiravudh had been a king without a queen for about ten years. In 1920, he met Her Serene Highness Princess Varnvimol at his theatre at Phayathai Palace. They were engaged and Princess Vanbimol was elevated to Princess Vallabhadevi. However, four months later in 1921, Vajiravudh nullified the engagement and pursued Princess Vallabha's sister, Princess Lakshamilavan, whom he engaged. However, the marriage was never held and the couple then separated. Princess Vallabha Devi was house-arrested in the Grand Palace from then on.

In 1921, Vajiravudh married Prueang Sucharitakul, who was a daughter of Lord Suthammamontri and elevated her to Lady Sucharitsuda. He then married Sucharitsuda's sister, Prabai Sucharitakul, with the title of Lady Indrani. In 1922, Lady Indrani was elevated to Princess and Queen Indrasakdisachi. However, the queen suffered two miscarriages. In 1924, Vajiravudh married Krueakaew Abhaiwongse, later renamed Suvadhana, a daughter of Lord Aphaiphubet. Queen Indrasakdisachi was then demoted to Princess Consort in 1925.

Vajiravudh had only one child, a daughter with Suvadhana, Princess Bejaratana Rajasuda. In his influential book Imagined Communities, Anglo-Irish political scientist and historian Benedict Anderson speculated that the king was homosexual and that this would have prevented him from accession if the law of succession had not been reformed. Anderson was the first modern scholar to break the taboo and write about the king's personal preferences.

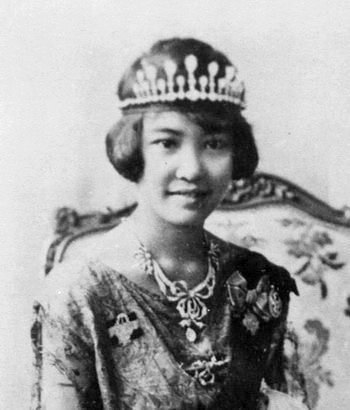
Lakshamilavan

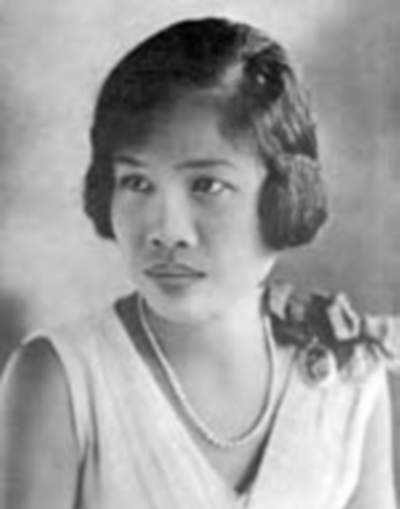
Sucharit Suda

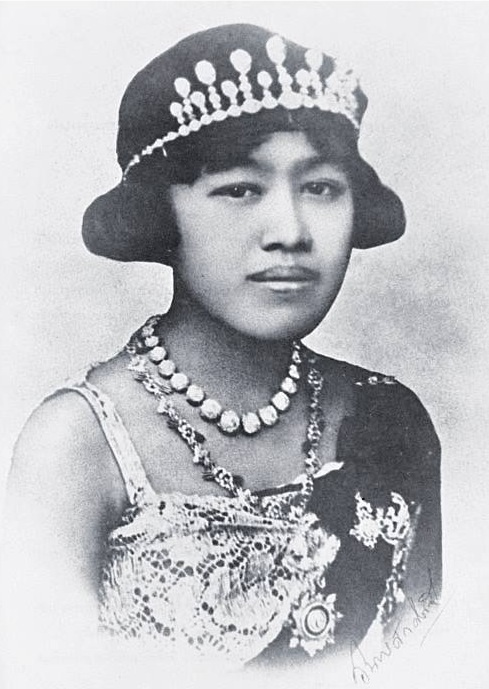
Indrasakdi Sachi

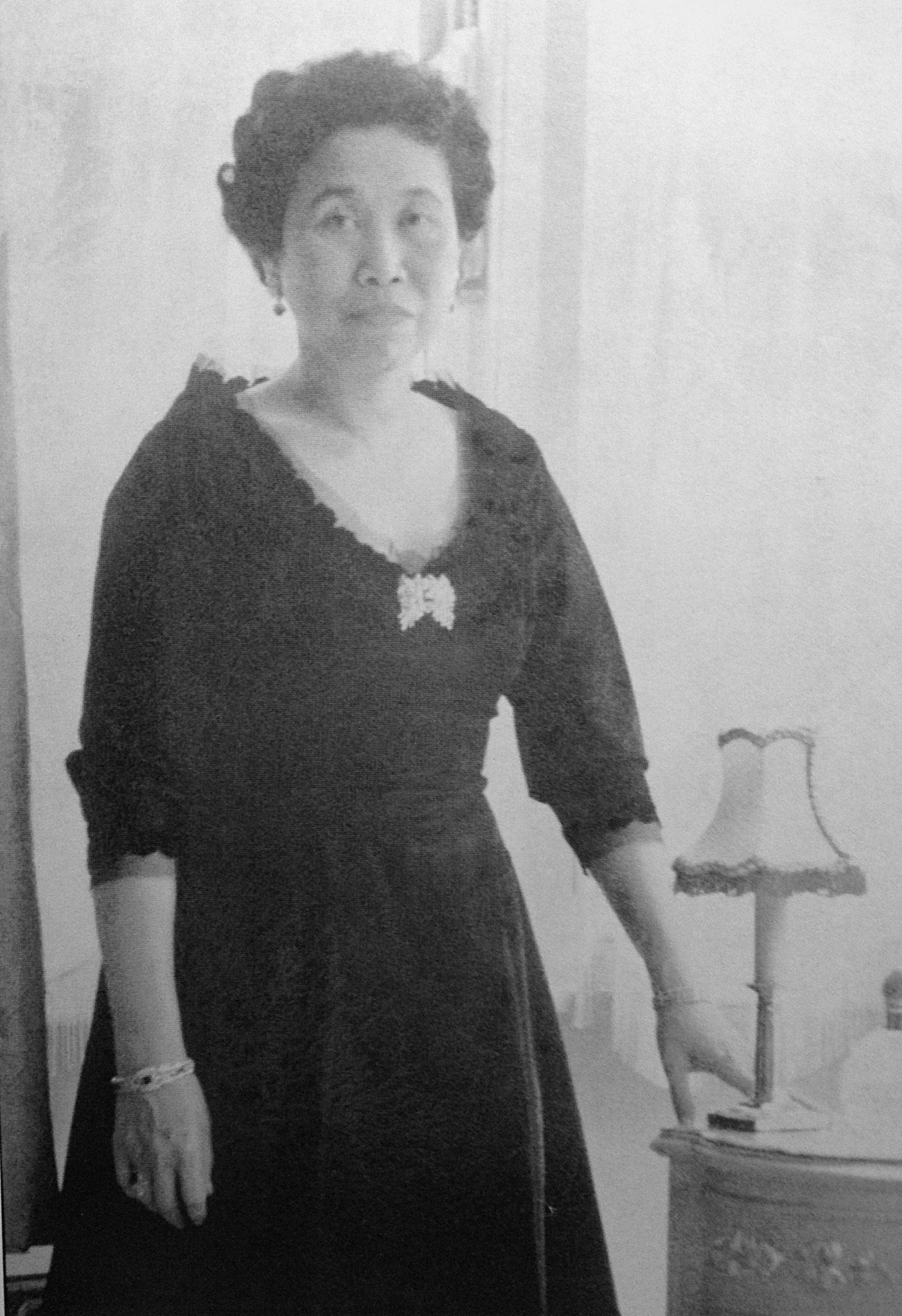
Suvadhana

== Succession law ==
In 1924, Vajiravudh promulgated his Law of Succession, which has since become the code for Chakri dynasty successions. According to the law, the throne would be passed to the king's sons and grandsons. However, in the case of Vajiravudh who had no sons, the throne would pass to his eldest "true" or full brother, that is, a brother who shared both the same father and mother, Queen Saovabha Phongsri. The law gave priority to the descendants of princes born to Queen Saovabha, then to Queen Savang Vadhana, and then to Queen Sukhumala Marasri. The law also forbade princes whose mother was foreign from the throne. This referred to his brother, Prince Chakrabongse, who had married a Russian woman. His son, Prince Chula Chakrabongse, was therefore barred from the throne.

== Financial problems and death ==
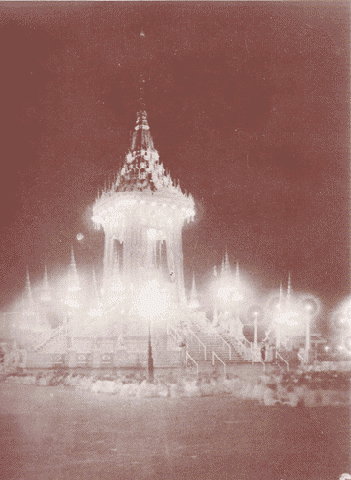
Cremation pyre of King Vajiravudh at night in 1929

In 1924, King Vajiravudh, accompanied by Suvadhana, visited the Federated Malay States. The reconciliation with European powers on unequal treaties progressed gradually; while the financial crisis was taking a great toll on Siam, as another loan was taken from Britain, and the firing of numerous government officials occurred. In 1925, Vajiravudh had to dissolve his Nakorn Sri Thammarat Regiment and merge provinces into larger units to lower maintenance costs.

In November 1925, it was announced that Vajiravudh fell ill. Princess Consort Suvadhana was then pregnant. Vajiravudh then announced his succession instructions: if Princess Suvadhana gave birth to a son, the throne would go to him. If not, the throne would pass to his surviving brother, Prince Prajadhipok of Sukhothai. He barred Princess Indrasakdisachi from being interred with him in the future and instead granted that right to Princess Suvadhana. Vajiravudh also barred his uncle, Prince Damrong, from the government.

On the night of 25 November, Princess Suvadhana gave birth to a princess only two hours before Vajiravudh's death. Vajiravudh glimpsed his sole daughter for the first and only time before his demise on 26 November 1925. The throne passed to his brother, Prajadhipok, who named Vajiravudh's daughter as Princess Bejaratana.

== Tributes to Vajiravudh ==
The 1930 poem "Elegia do rei de Sião" ("Elegy to the King of Siam") by Brazilian modernist poet Carlos Drummond de Andrade is dedicated to Vajiravudh.

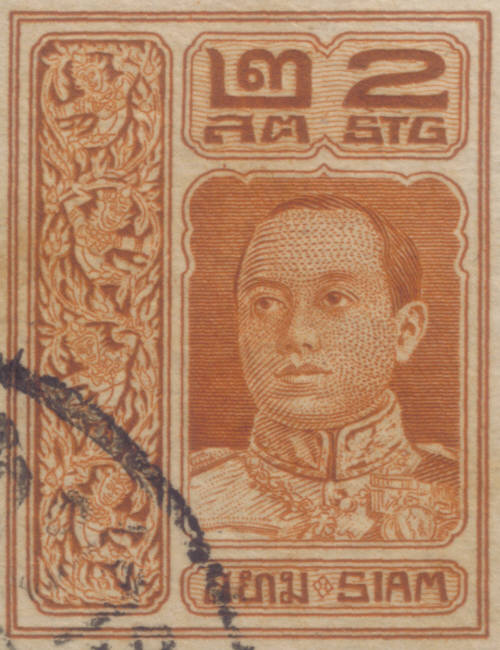
King Vajiravudh on a stamp

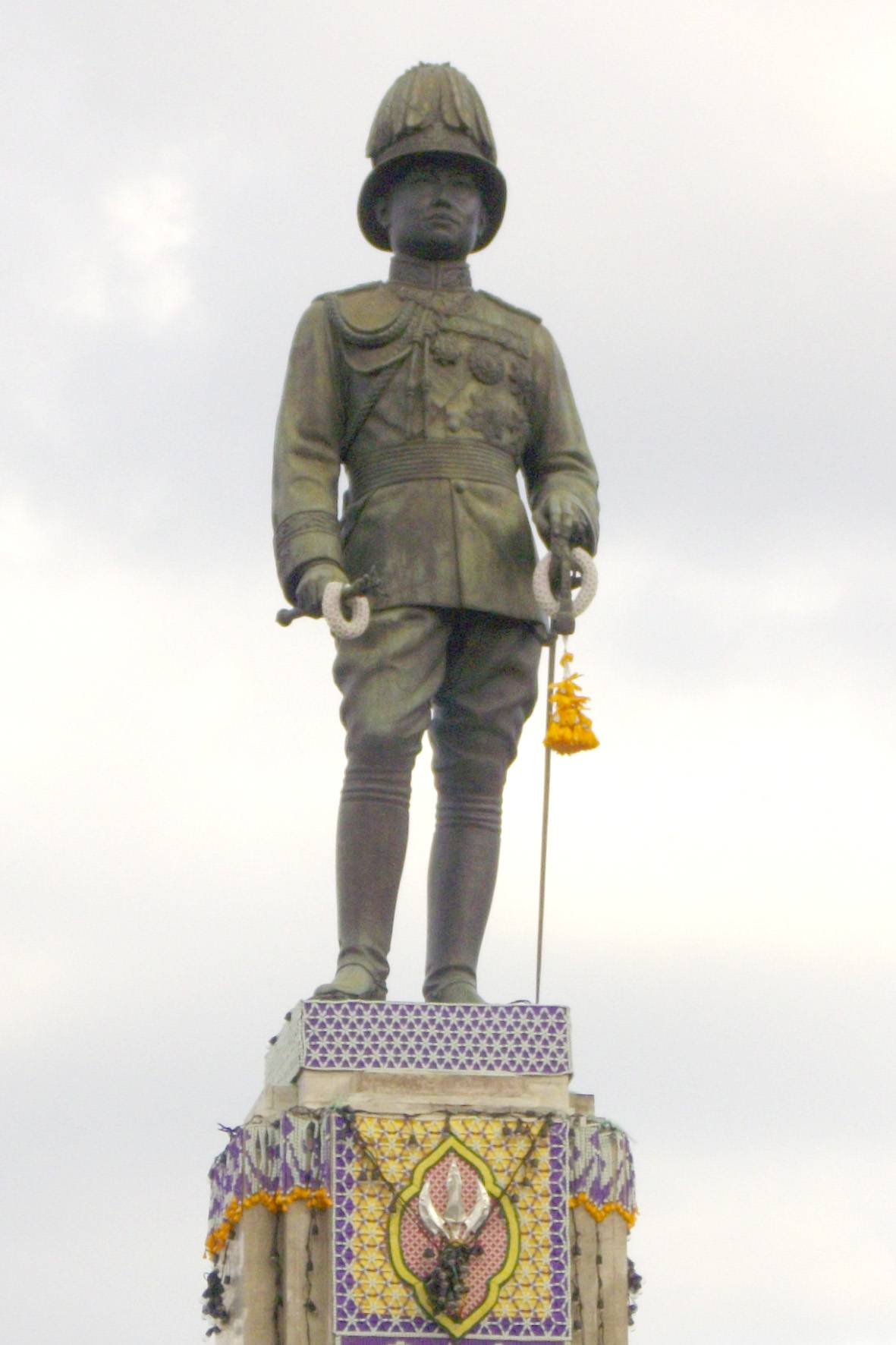
Statue of the king in Lumphini Park, Dusit, Bangkok

== Honours ==
Styles of: King Vajiravudh; Rama VI of Siam
- Reference style: His Majesty
- Spoken style: Your Majesty

Royal Monograms of King Vajiravudh
- Left: ว.ป.ร.6 (Vajiravudh Parama Rajadhiraja VI)
- Right: ร.ร.6 (Rama Rajadhipati VI)

=== Military ranks ===
- Field Marshal, Admiral of the Fleet and Captain General of the Wild Tiger Corps
- Honorary General, British Army

=== National honours ===
- Knight (and Sovereign) of the Most Illustrious Order of the Royal House of Chakri
- Knight (and Sovereign) of the Ancient and Auspicious Order of the Nine Gems
- Knight Grand Cordon (and Sovereign) of the Most Illustrious Order of Chula Chom Klao
- Knight of the Ratana Varabhorn Order of Merit
- Knight Grand Commander (and Sovereign) of the Honourable Order of Rama
- Knight Grand Cordon (and Sovereign) of the Most Exalted Order of the White Elephant
- Knight Grand Cordon of the Most Noble Order of the Crown of Thailand
- Member of the Vallabhabhorn Order
- Member of the Vajira Mala Order
- Rajaniyom Medal
- War Medal of B.E. 2461 (WW1)
- Dushdi Mala Medal Pin of Service to the Nation (Military)
- Dushdi Mala Medal Pin of arts and sciences (Civilian)
- Chakra Mala Medal
- King Rama V Royal Cypher Medal, First Class
- King Rama VI Royal Cypher Medal, First Class
- King Rama VI Court Medal, Gold Medal
- King Rama VI Coronation Medal
- Chai Medal

=== Foreign honours ===
- Sweden:
  - Knight of the Order of the Seraphim (RSerafO), 14 July 1897
- Denmark:
  - Knight of the Order of the Elephant (RE), 27 July 1897
- Spain:
  - Knight of the Order of the Golden Fleece, 15 May 1902 - (Note: from Queen Maria Christina, Regent of Spain, when he attended the enthronement ceremonies for King Alfonso XIII in Madrid.)
  - Grand Cross of the Order of Charles III, with Collar, 16 October 1897
- Kingdom of Italy:
  - Knight of the Supreme Order of the Most Holy Annunciation, 1 April 1901
- Austria-Hungary:
  - Grand Cross of the Royal Hungarian Order of St. Stephen, 1902
- United Kingdom:
  - Honorary Grand Cross of the Order of the Bath (GCB)
  - Honorary Knight Grand Commander of the Most Exalted Order of the Star of India (GCSI), 26 April 1918
  - Honorary Grand Cross of the Royal Victorian Order (GCVO), 21 April 1902 (Note: invested by King Edward VII at Buckingham Palace after he reached his majority.)
- German Empire:
  - Knight of the Order of Merit of the Prussian Crown, 30 May 1902 (Note: from Emperor Wilhelm II during an official visit to Berlin.)
- Baden:
  - Knight of the House Order of Fidelity, 1902
- Empire of Japan:
  - Grand Cordon of the Order of the Chrysanthemum, 9 December 1902
- France:
  - Grand Cross of the National Order of the Legion of Honour, 1903
- Netherlands:
  - Knight Grand Cross of the Order of the Netherlands Lion, 1917

== Ancestry ==
Ancestors of Vajiravudh

8. (=12.) King Phutthaloetla Naphalai, Rama II of Rattanakosin
4. (=6.) King Mongkut, Rama IV of Siam
9. (=13.) Princess Bunrot of Rattanakosin
2. King Chulalongkorn, Rama V of Siam
10. Prince Siriwongse, Prince Matyabidhak
5. Princess Ramphoei Siriwong of Siam
11. Noi
1. King Vajiravudh, Rama VI of Siam
12. (=8.) King Phutthaloetla Naphalai, Rama II of Rattanakosin
6. (=4.) King Mongkut, Rama IV of Siam
13. (=9.) Princess Bunrot of Rattanakosin
3. Princess Saovabha Phongsri of Siam
14. Taeng Sucharitakul, Luang Asasamdaeng
7. Piam Sucharitakul
15. Nak, Thao Sucharitthamrong

== See also ==
- 1924 Palace Law of Succession

== Notes ==
Vajiravudh (Rama VI) House of Chakri Born: 1 January 1881 Died: 25 November 1925
Regnal titles
Preceded by Chulalongkorn	King of Siam; 23 October 1910 – 26 November 1925	Succeeded by Prajadhipok
Thai royalty
Preceded by Vajirunhis	Crown Prince of Siam; 4 January 1895 – 23 October 1910	Vacant Title next held by Vajiralongkorn
