= Boy Scout Citation Medal =

Thai civil decoration

Boy Scout Citation Medal เหรียญลูกเสือสดุดี
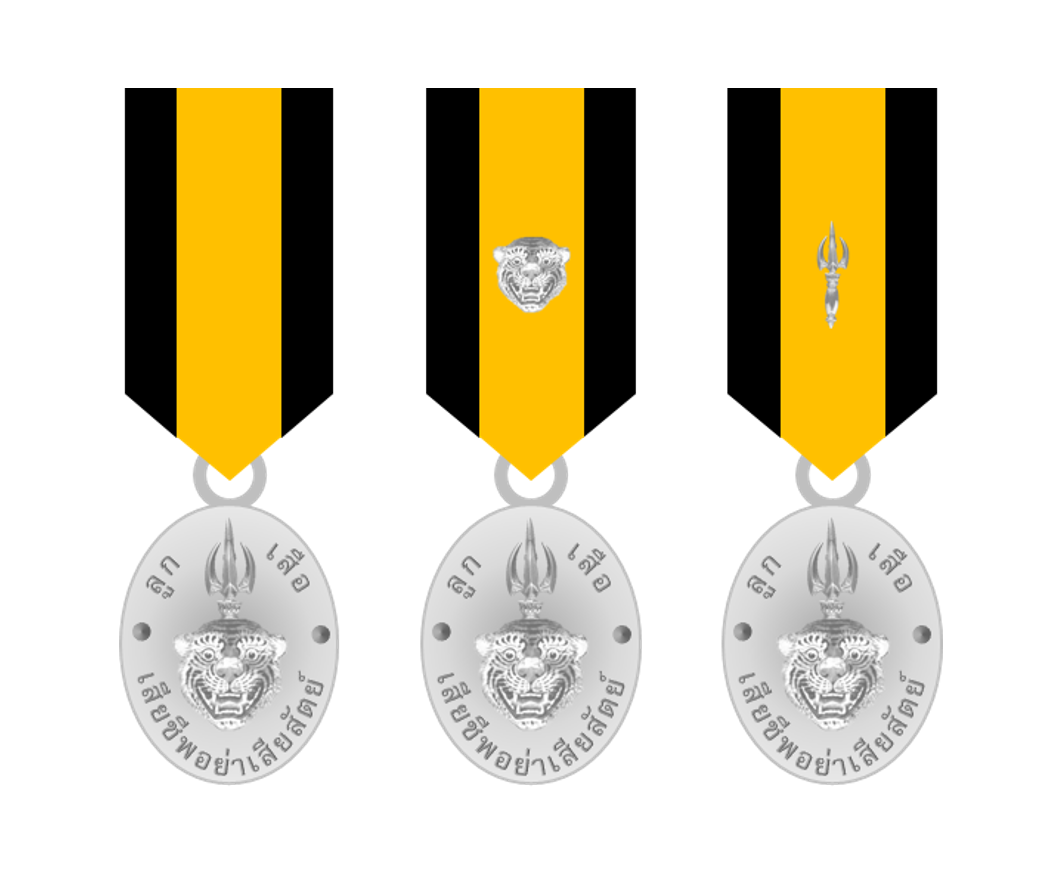

Awarded by the King of Thailand
- Type: Medal
- Established: 1947
- Awarded for: People who devoted their lives in service to the Scouting Movement in Thailand
- Status: Currently constituted
- Founder: HM King Bhumibol Adulyadej
- Sovereign: HM King Vajiralongkorn
- Grades: 3

Statistics
- First induction: Prince Damrong Rajanubhab (posthumous), 1953

Precedence
- Next (higher): Boy Scout Commendation Medal
- Next (lower): Sustainable Scout Medal
- First Class Second Class Third Class; Ribbon bar of the Boy Scout Citation Medal

The Boy Scout Citation Medal (Thai: เหรียญลูกเสือสดุดี) is a civil decoration in the honours system of Thailand, and the sixteenth-ranked medal among those granted for services to the state. The award was established by King Rama IX of Thailand in 1947 to be bestowed onto those who have rendered constant service and support to Boy Scout activities. This medal has three classes.

For recipients of the first class of this medal for five years, will received Order of Ramkeerati.

== Classes ==
This medal has three classes:

- First Class of Boy Scout Citation Medal of Vajira (เหรียญลูกเสือสดุดีชั้นที่ 1)
- Second Class of Boy Scout Citation Medal of Vajira (เหรียญลูกเสือสดุดีชั้นที่ 2)
- Third Class of Boy Scout Citation Medal of Vajira (เหรียญลูกเสือสดุดีชั้นที่ 3)

== Famous recipients ==
=== Thai people ===
- Prince Damrong Rajanubhab
- Sarit Thanarat
- Suchinda Kraprayoon
- Yingluck Shinawatra
- Prawit Wongsuwan

=== Foreign ===
- Bhutan: Jigme Khesar Namgyel Wangchuck
- Sweden: Queen Silvia of Sweden
