= Indrasakdi Sachi =

Queen of Siam from 1923 to 1925

Indarasakdi Sachi; อินทรศักดิศจี
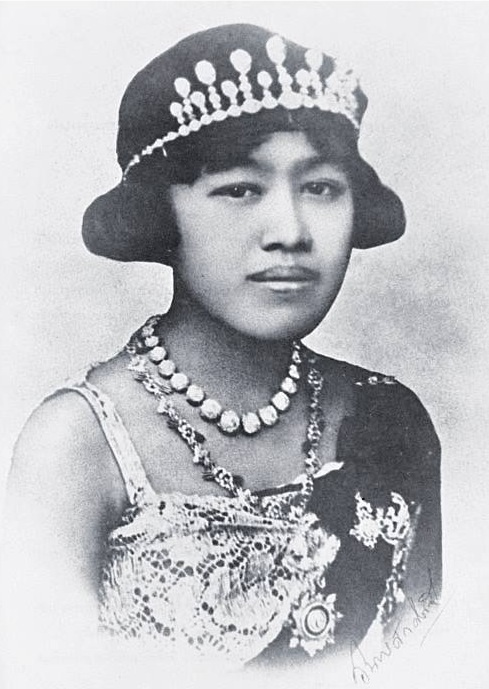

Princess consort of Siam
- Tenure: 10 June 1922 – 1 January 1923; 15 September 1925 – 26 November 1925

Queen consort of Siam
- Tenure: 1 January 1923 – 15 September 1925
- Born: Praphai Sucharitakul; 10 June 1902; Bangkok, Siam
- Died: 30 November 1975 (aged 73); Bangkok, Thailand
- Spouse: Vajiravudh (Rama VI) (m. 1922; died 1925)
- Dynasty: Chakri (by marriage)
- Father: Pluem Sucharitakul
- Mother: Kimlai Tejakambuja
- Religion: Theravada Buddhism

Four wives of Vajiravudh
(by years of marriage)

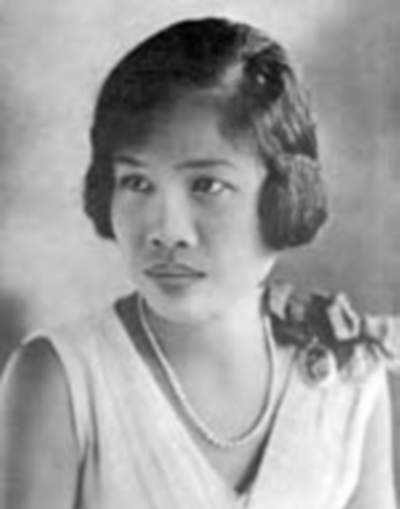
Sucharit Suda
(1921–1925)

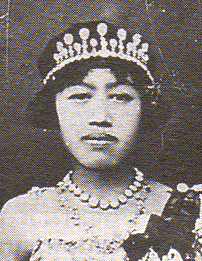
Indrasakdi Sachi
(1922–1925)

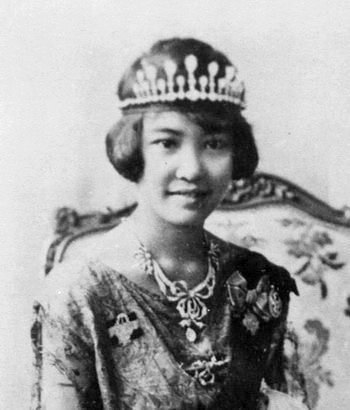
Lakshamilavan
(1922–1925)

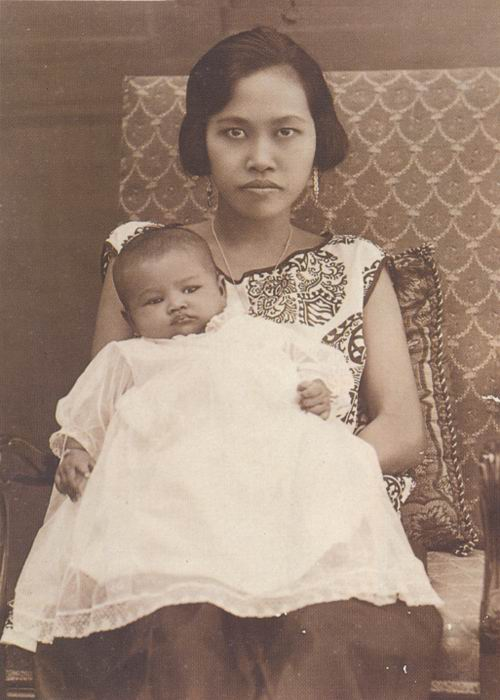
Suvadhana
(1924–1925)

Princess Indrasakdi Sachi (Note: Thai: อินทรศักดิศจี; RTGS: Inthrasak Sachi), formerly Her Majesty Queen Indrasakdi Sachi (10 June 1902 – 30 November 1975), née Praphai Sucharitakul (Note: Thai: ประไพ สุจริตกุล; RTGS: Praphai Sucharitakun), full title Her Highness Princess Indrasakdi Sachi, was a royal consort of King Vajiravudh (Rama VI) of Siam. She was one of the daughters of Chao Praya Sudharm Montri, the younger sister of Pra Sucharit Suda the one concubine of King Vajiravudh. The name means "Sachi (or Indrani), wife of Indra."

Sachi would become queen after falling pregnant with King Vajiravudh's child, who was eager for an heir. However, the Queen miscarried five or six times during her queenship and was later demoted to the rank of Princess Consort.

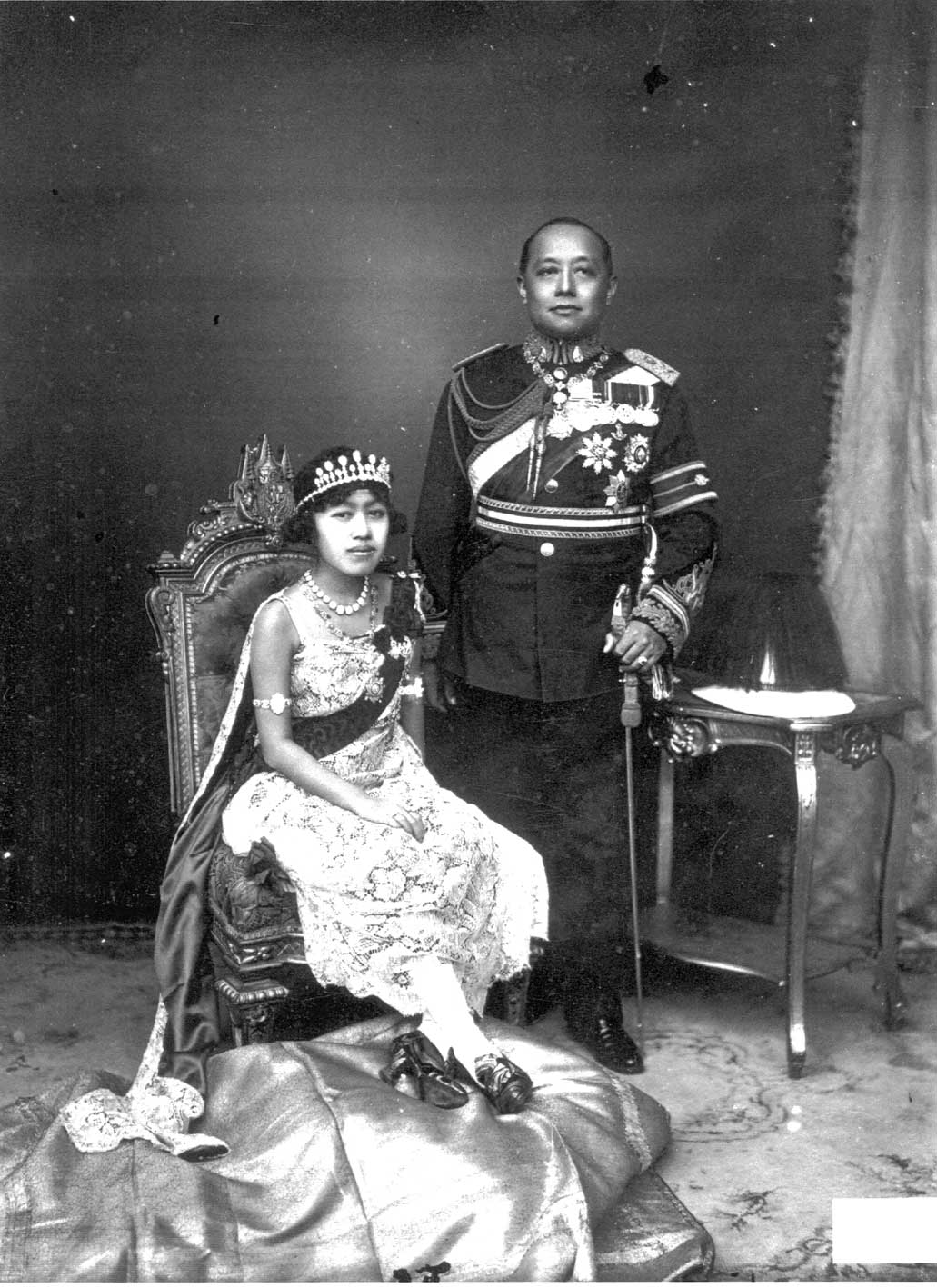
King Vajiravudh and Queen Indrasakdi Sachi in First Wedding Anniversary, 12 January 1922.

== Titles and styles ==
Styles of Princess Indrasakdi Sachi, The Princess consort
- Reference style: Her Highness
- Spoken style: Your Highness

- 10 June 1902 - 12 January 1921 : Praphai Sucharitakul (Thai: ประไพ สุจริตกุล)
- 12 January 1921 - 10 June 1922 : Lady Indranee (Thai: พระอินทราณี; Phra Indranee)
- 10 June 1922 - 1 January 1923 : Her Highness Princess Indrasakdi Sachi, The Royal Consort (Thai: พระวรราชชายาเธอ พระอินทรศักดิศจี; RTGS: Phra Vara Rajachaya Thoe Phra Indrasakdi Sachi)
- 1 January 1923 - 15 September 1925 : Her Majesty The Queen (Thai: สมเด็จพระนางเจ้าอินทรศักดิศจี พระบรมราชินี; RTGS: Somdet Phra Nang Chao Indrasakdi Sachi Phra Boromma Rajini)
- 15 September 1925 - 30 November 1975 : Her Highness Princess Indrasakdi Sachi, The Princess Consort (Thai: สมเด็จพระนางเจ้าอินทรศักดิศจี พระวรราชชายา; RTGS: Somdet Phra Nang Chao Indrasakdi Sachi Phra Vara Rajachaya)

== Notes ==
Thai royalty
| Vacant Title last held by Saovabha Phongsri | Queen consort of Siam; 1923–1925 | Vacant Title next held by Rambai Barni |
