= Vallabha Devi =

Thai princess (1892–1951)

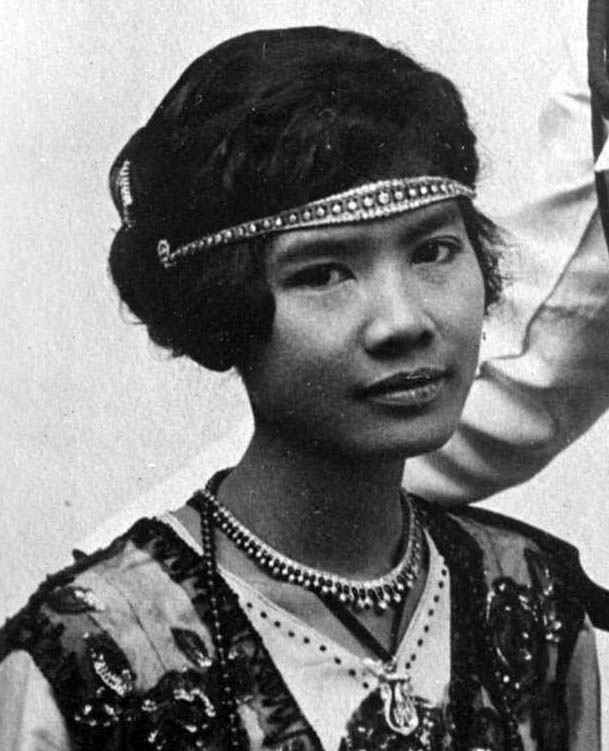
- Born: 25 October 1892; Bangkok, Siam
- Died: 7 April 1951 (aged 58); Siriraj Hospital, Bangkok, Thailand
- House: Vorawan family (Chakri dynasty)
- Father: Worawannakon, Prince Narathip Praphanphong
- Mother: Lady In

Vallabha Devi also spelled Warnrabhathewee (Thai: วัลลภาเทวี; RTGS: Wanlapha Thewi; 25 October 1892 – 7 April 1951), born Princess Wanwimon Worawan (Thai: วรรณวิมล วรวรรณ), was the eldest child and first daughter of Worawannakon, Prince Narathip Praphanphong and Lady In. She was former fiancée of Vajiravudh, King Rama VI of Siam.

Her younger half-sister, Lakshamilavan was elevated to Princess consort of Vajiravudh. However Lakshamilavan separated her residence from her husband.

== Biography ==
Princess Wanwimon Worawan met King Rama VI when she was 27 years old, while King Rama VI was 40. The King was playing bridge at the Phayathai Palace where a painting contest was also being held, with many women in the social circle of the royal family in attendance, when they met. The King and Princess Wanwimon Worawan reportedly connected over their similar tastes in the arts and literature, and shared an appreciation for witty, urbane conversation. Shortly after the news of King Rama VI's engagement to Princess Wanwimon Worawan, she became known by the new name of Vallabha Devi. During their engagement, when the princess came to Chitralada Royal Villa, she frequently spoke on the phone with the King.

Just eight months after their engagement had been first announced, news came that it was to be dissolved—the royal rank of the Princess was reduced and she was requested to reside within the palace for the remainder of the King's reign. The reasons for the sudden withdrawal of the engagement were never publicized. After the death of King Rama VI, Worawan lived at Phra Karuna Niwas Palace at Phichai Road. She died in 1951 at the age of 58.
