= St Mabyn Church of England Primary School =

- View of St Mabyn Primary School from the church tower

Location
- St Mabyn, Cornwall, PL30 3BQ; England
- Coordinates: 50.525°N 4.766°W

Information
- Type: Academy
- Religious affiliation: Church of England
- Established: 1845
- Department for Education URN: 139090 Tables
- Ofsted: Reports
- Headteacher: Joanna Redford-James
- Gender: mixed
- Age: 2 to 11
- Enrolment: 49 (2026)
- Capacity: 84
- Website: https://www.stmabyn-cornwall.co.uk/

St Mabyn C of E Primary School is a Church of England Primary School with academy status located in the village of St Mabyn between Bodmin and Wadebridge in Cornwall, England, UK. The school educates boys and girls between the ages of four and eleven and has 49 pupils with two mixed age classes. The school federated with St Tudy C of E Primary School in January 2010 with Karen Holmes as joint head. It formed part of the Saints Way Multi Academy Trust, until 2022 when it became part of St Barnabas Multi-Academy Trust.

== History ==
The parochial school was founded by a deed of grant dated 1 October 1845. The site was given by Viscount Falmouth on 31 July 1846. The land was part of the manor of Trevisquite, within the parish of St Mabyn. In 1846 the building work was completed at a total cost of £445. The walls of the school cottage were built with stone from Treblethick quarry.

In March 1897 there was a meeting regarding the enlargement of the school buildings and in April 1897 a 3d in the pound rate was levied for a year to fund the building. In June 1897 a tender from Mr A. Hamley for £155-10s for the masonry was accepted by the school committee. In February 1898 Miss Giles was engaged as an additional teacher at a salary of £18 and in March 1898 Edith May was appointed at a salary of £25 a year. The H.M. Inspectors' report of the higher classes in 1899 was so unsatisfactory that the committee asked Miss Giles to resign and in January 1900 Mr and Mrs Giles were given 3 months notice to quit.

In 2009 there was a proposal to replace St Mabyn and St Tudy schools with a purpose built facility at Longstone, an action group (Hands Off Our Schools) was set up and Cornwall Council dropped the plans.

In 2012 the school joined the Saints Way Multi Academy Trust with an assurance that "there was a solemn commitment to ensure that each individual school would retain its own identity and ethos".

== Past headteachers ==
- Thomas Hurcombe (1851)
- Thomas Giles (1893)
- James F. Reid (1901)
- Cyril Hannafore (1935)
- D. A. J. Hicks (1964 - 1979)
- Leonard Truran (1979 - 1981)
- J. Henchley (1981 - 1996)
- Daphne Puttock (1996 - 2009)
- Karen Holmes (2009 - 2017)
- Brigid Howells (2009 - 2024)
- Joanna Redford-James (2024–Present)

== Notable past pupils ==
- Jago – children's book illustrator.
- Ben Oliver – Cornish record holder for the 100m and 400m Wheelchair racing and ranked best in the world at 800 metres, having set a new European record.
- Tristan Stephenson – mixologist and industry expert.

== Ofsted inspections ==
The school was judged by Ofsted as good and improving in 2010. The 2014 Ofsted inspection said that the school required improvement. The principal of the academy complained to Ofsted about "a lack of consistency in the way inspectors reach their headline conclusions.” The 2017 Ofsted rated the school as good.

- May 2002
- June 2007
- May 2010
- January 2017
