= Kateryna Desnytska =

Ukrainian-born nurse and Siamese princess (1886–1960)

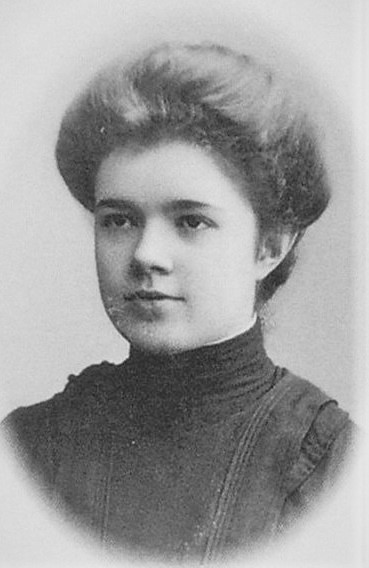
- Kateryna Desnytska aged 14, 1900
- Born: Katerina Ivanovna Desnitskaya; 27 April 1886; Lutsk, Russian Empire
- Died: 3 January 1960 (aged 73); Paris, France
- Other name: Katerin Na Phitsanulok
- Spouse: Chakrabongse Bhuvanath (m. 1906; div. 1919)
- Children: Chula Chakrabongse
- Parents: Ivan Desnitsky (father); Maria Khizhnyakova (mother)

Kateryna Desnytska, Duchess of Phitsanulok (Ukrainian: Катерина Десницька; Thai: คัทริน เดสนิตสกี สโตน; 27 April 1886 – 3 January 1960) was a Ukrainian-born nurse who became a princess as wife of the Siamese prince Chakrabongse Bhuvanath. She was a participant in the Russo-Japanese War and was awarded the Cross of St. George (1904). The royal love story between Kateryna and Chakrabongse is described in literary works and a ballet.

== Early life and education ==
Kateryna Desnytska was born on 27 April 1886 in Lutsk, Volhynian Governorate, Russian Empire (today northwestern Ukraine). Desnytska was one of 12 children born into a wealthy family. Both her parents had children from previous marriages, with four coming from her mother's first marriage; six from her father's first marriage; and their marriage together produced Kateryna and her brother Ivan. Desnytska's father was a chief judge of the Lutsk District Court, but died when she was two. Following his death, her mother sold their family property and moved to Kyiv with her children.

In Kyiv, she studied at the Fundukleyiv Women's Gymnasium, graduating in 1904; the same year her mother died. She and her older brother then travelled to Saint Petersburg to live with their godmother. While her brother studied at university, she attended a Medical Nursing School.

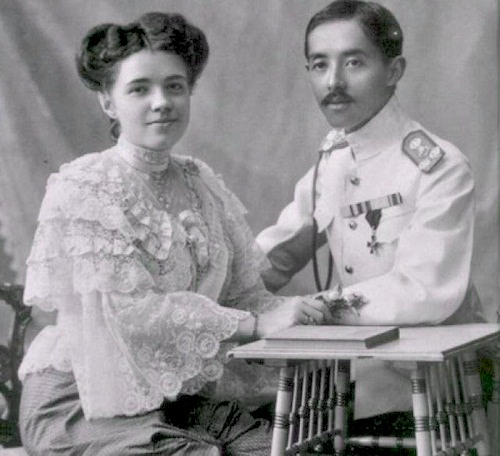
Desnitski and Chakrabongse in 1906

== Marriage ==
During her time in Saint Petersburg, Desnitski became a popular socialite in Russian high society. In March 1905, she attended a grand ball hosted by Tsar Nicholas II where she met her future husband, Chakrabongse Bhuvanat. Chakrabongse was the Prince of Bishnulok and the son of King Chulalongkorn of Siam. He had recently received military education in Saint Petersburg, and was a graduate of the Page Corps.

Despite both being in love with each other, Desnitski volunteered as nurse in Manchuria where she served in the Russo-Japanese War and was awarded three medals. During her time away, Chakrabongse wrote numerous letters to her. Following her return from Manchuria, he proposed to Desnitski, of which she accepted on the condition that she would be his only wife as Siamese society tolerated polygamy for royals. This condition was accepted by Chakrabongse.

The couple sought permission from one of Desnitski's brother, Ivan. However, due to Russian priests refusing to join a Buddhist and Orthodox together in marriage, the two travelled in 1906 to Constantinople in the Ottoman Empire where they found an Orthodox priest who would marry them, marrying in the Greek Church of the Holy Trinity. They then spent their honeymoon in Cairo, before Chakrabongse travelled alone to Siam via Singapore to prepare the Royal Court for his foreign wife, leaving Desnytska in Singapore.

== Life in Siam ==
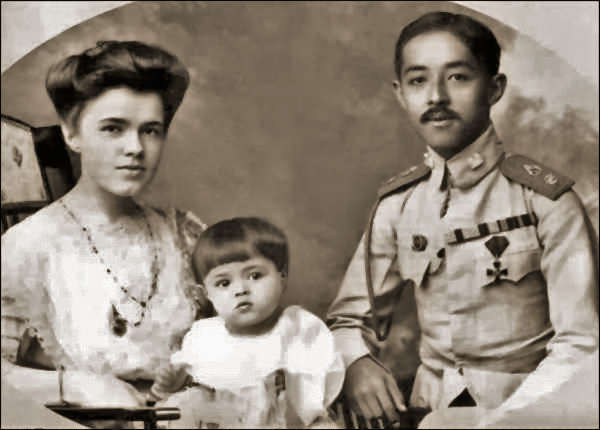
Catherine with Prince Chakrabongse Bhuvanath of Siam and young Chula Chakrabongse

After arriving in Siam, Desnytska learned how to speak Siamese within the first two years, along with English. She was then given the title of Princess Phitsanulok (Mom Katerin Na Phitsanulok), allowing her to officially marry Chakrabongse. The two then had a son called Chula Chakrabongse, who was born on 28 March 1908 at their residence at the Paruskavan Palace in Bangkok.

When Chulalongkorn died on 23 October 1910, he was succeeded by Chakrabongse's older brother Vajiravudh. However, Vajiravudh lack of children meant that Chakrabongse became the heir-apparent as Hereditary Prince of Siam. Together with her husband, they travelled to Saint Petersburg where they were received by Nicholas II, before continuing on to visit her relatives in Kyiv.

However, their relationship began to decline when in 1912, Desnytska discovered that Chakrabongse was having an affair with his 15-year old niece, Chuvalit. Despite swearing his love for Desnytska, he elevated Chuvalit to the status of a royal wife. Not pleased with his polygamy, she divorced Chakrabongse in 1919, but she refused an initial financial settlement for a smaller annual payment of £1,200. The divorce also meant that she had to leave her son in Siam with her father.

== Post-marriage ==
Following their divorce, she moved to Peking where her brother was working as a director of the Chinese Eastern Railway. This was due to the Russian Civil War where she could not return to Ukraine due to conflict. Appalled by Peking's situation, she joined the Russian Benevolent Society, as well as the Red Cross, while also attending events held by the White Russian community. When Chakrabongse died in 1920, his funeral in Bangkok was attended by Desnytska. She then married an American engineer, Harry Clinton Stone. When the Second Sino-Japanese War began in 1937, the two moved to Paris and then Portland, United States. However, Desnytska and Stone divorced and Desnytska subsequently moved to Paris where her brother Ivan's widow lived with her children. Desnytska was buried in Paris following her death on 3 January 1960.

== Personal life ==
Desnytska was an Orthodox Christian, but developed a liking for Buddhism. When she was married to Chakrabongse, the two had two other homes: one across from the Wat Arun in Bangkok, and another in Hua Hin.

=== Descendants ===
She met her only grand-daughter just once – Narisa Chakrabongse (b. 1956), the daughter of her son Chula Chakrabongse and his English wife Elizabeth Hunter. In 1995, Narisa Chakrabongse, in collaboration with Eileen Hunter (her maternal aunt), published the book Katya and the Prince of Siam.

Narisa maintained good relations with her cousins from the Desnitski family in Paris and St. Petersburg. Her son, Catherine's great-grandson, Hugo Chakrabongse Levy, a musician and composer, is married to Thai actress Tasanavalai Ongartittichai.

== Honours ==
- Dame Commander (Second Class, lower grade) of the Most Illustrious Order of Chula Chom Klao
- King Rama VI Royal Cypher Medal, 3rd Class (1911)
