= Hugo (musician) =

Thai American actor and musician (born 1981)

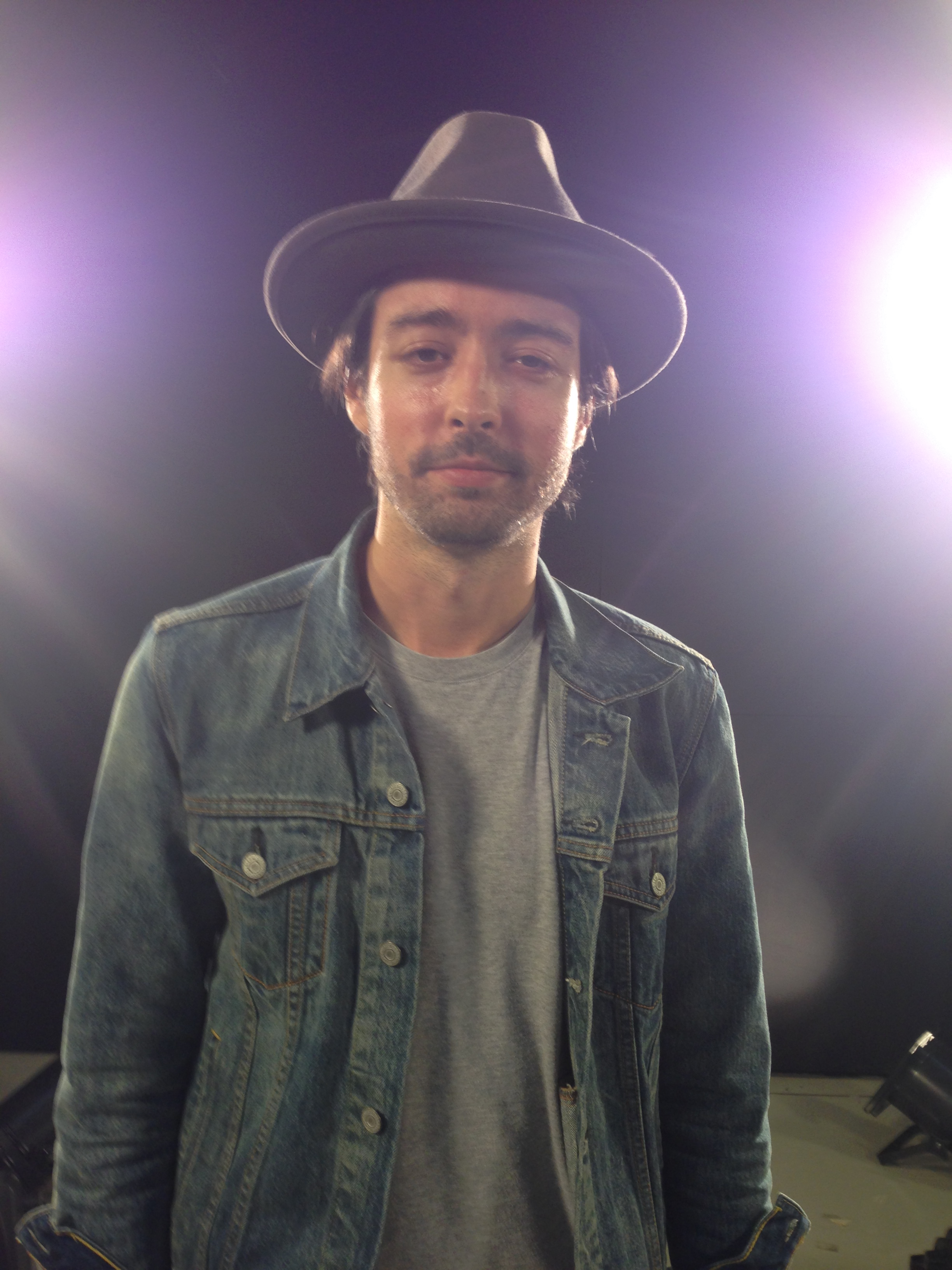
- Hugo at VERY TV in November 2014
- Born: Hugo Chula Alexander Levy; 6 August 1981 (age 45); London, England
- Other name: Chulachak Chakrabongse
- Occupations: Singer; songwriter; actor
- Years active: 2000–present
- Spouse: Tassanawalai Ongartitthichai (m. 2009)
- Children: 2
- Parents: Allen Levy (father); Narisa Chakrabongse (mother)
- Musical career
- Genres: Country; blues rock; bluegrass
- Label: Roc Nation

Hugo Chakrabongse Levy (born 6 August 1981), known under the mononym Hugo or Thai name Chulachak Chakrabongse (Thai: จุลจักร จักรพงษ์; RTGS: Chunlachak Chakkraphong) is a British Thai actor and singer-songwriter. Based in New York City and signed to Jay-Z's Roc Nation label, his musical style has been dubbed by Roc Nation as "gangsta-rock". He is best known for his bluegrass re-working of Jay-Z's "99 Problems". His debut album, Old Tyme Religion, was released on 10 May 2011. He can trace direct royal heritage back from his maternal great-grandfather, Prince Chakrabongse Bhuvanath, a son of King Rama V of Thailand, and is a second cousin once removed of the King of Thailand, King Vajiralongkorn.

== Early life and career ==
Levy was born in London to M.R. Narisa Chakrabongse, raised in Thailand near the Chao Phraya River, and used to live in the Hell's Kitchen neighborhood of New York City. Now he resides in Bangkok, Thailand. He is the grandson of Prince Chula Chakrabongse, the great-grandson of Prince Chakrabongse Bhuvanath, and the great-great-grandson of King Rama V of Siam. He is of English, Russian, Scottish, Thai and Ukrainian heritage.

As a teenager, he released four studio albums with the band Siplor, which had several of its records banned on the radio. After moving to London, he became highly influenced by blues musicians such as Howling Wolf, Son House, Robert Johnson and Skip James as well as more modern musicians and bands such as Guns N' Roses, Nirvana, Dr. Dre, Jeff Buckley, MGMT, Tame Impala, Black Rebel Motorcycle Club, Devendra Banhart, The Big Pink and Jack White. He achieved recognition when his song "Disappear" was featured on Beyoncé's album I Am... Sasha Fierce, beginning a series of collaborations that led to a record deal with Jay-Z's Roc Nation label in 2010.

== Personal life ==
He married his longtime girlfriend, Tassanawalai Ongartitthichai, in 2009. The couple have two children.

== Band ==
- Jon Cornell – bass
- Mark Slutsky – drums
- Chris LoPresto – keyboards
- Jay Barclay – guitar

== Discography ==
=== Studio albums ===
(2011) Old Tyme Religion

1. Old Tyme Religion
2. 99 Problems
3. Bread & Butter
4. Rock 'n' Roll Delight
5. Hopelessly Stoned
6. Hurt Makes It Beautiful
7. Born
8. Mekong River Delta
9. Sweetest Cure
10. Different Lives
11. Just a Shred
12. Wake Alone
13. Sai Lom (สายลม) (Thailand Edition)

(2014) Deep in the Long Grass

1. Twitch and Tug
2. I Need the Truth
3. Secrets and Lies
4. Quiet Fire
5. Hailstorms
6. Nightshift
7. All I Think About
8. A Fire Worth Keeping
9. The Long Grass
10. Down the River
11. Feather

(2017) ดำสนิท

1. ดำสนิท
2. อย่ามาให้เห็น
3. ครอบครอง
4. อานม้า
5. ระวัง
6. แค่มีเธอ
7. แพ้ให้เป็น
8. ยอม
9. Love Song No. 9
10. บันไดสีแดง

=== EP Albums ===
(2020) Lacuna

1. Call of the Void
2. All That I Know
3. The Deals We Make
4. Deeper Still
5. House of Mercy
6. Show Love

(2021) เรือสำราญราตรีอมตะ

(2024) เรือสำราญราตรีอมตะ ภาค 2 อีแร้งแห่งจักรวาล

(2025) D’Electro

1. Deleted Scenes
2. Something Else
3. Crime
4. Intruders
5. If The Devil’s Gonna Use Me
6. It Fades In

== In popular culture ==
Hugo's version of "99 Problems," his first single, was featured in the Natalie Portman/Ashton Kutcher romantic comedy No Strings Attached, in the 2011 remake of Fright Night, and in the pilot episode of the NBC thriller series The Blacklist. "Bread and Butter" was featured on the season two television promo for ABC's comedy-drama series Castle. The same song also featured on the seventh season of HBO's series Entourage.

== See also ==
- Roc Nation albums discography
