= Narisa Chakrabongse =

English activist and publisher

Mom Rajawongse Narisa Chakrabongse
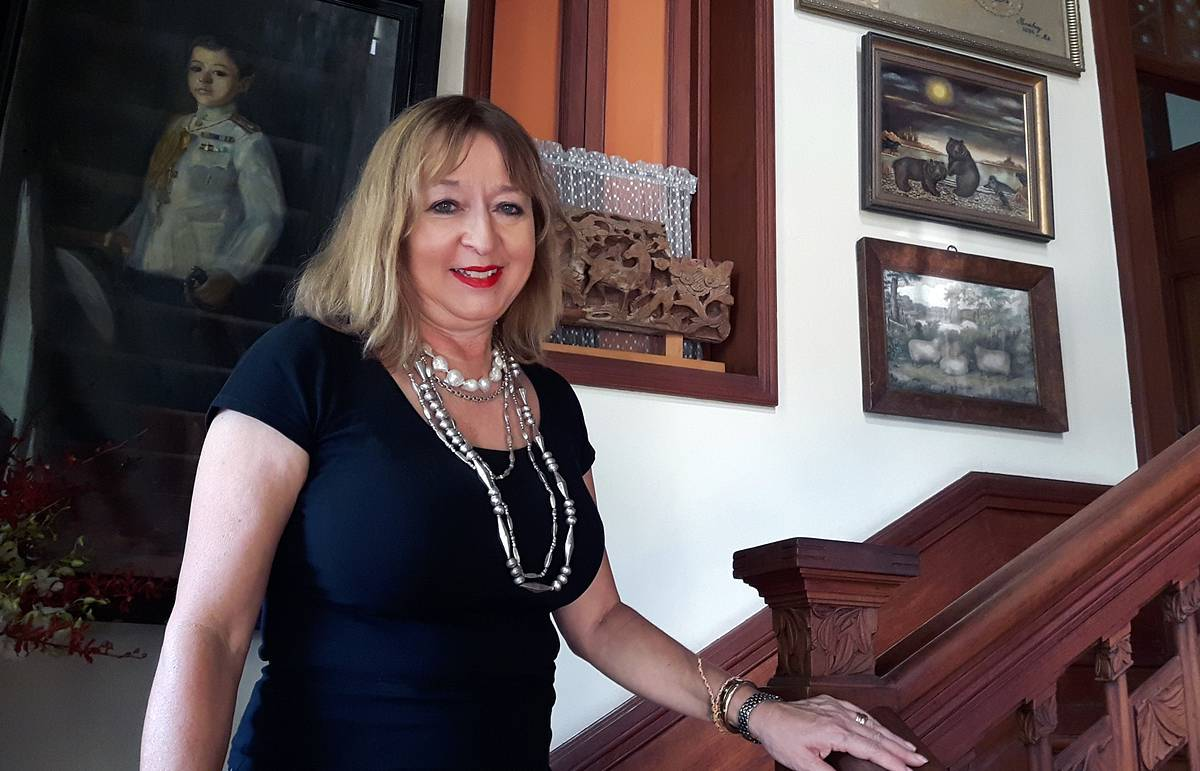
- Narisa Chakrabongse in 2014
- Born: 2 August 1956 (age 70); London, England
- Spouses: Allen Levy (divorced); Korsvasti Svasti Thomson
- Children: Hugo Chula Alexander Levy; Dominic Chakrabongse
- Parents: Chula Chakrabongse (father); Elisabeth Hunter (mother)

Narisa Chakrabongse (born 2 August 1956) is an English-Thai writer, publisher, and environmental activist. The only daughter of Prince Chula Chakrabongse, and the only granddaughter of Prince Chakrabongse and his Ukrainian wife Kateryna Desnytska, a great-granddaughter of the Siamese King Rama V the Great. Her official title is Mom Rajawongse (Thai: หม่อมราชวงศ์นริศรา จักรพงษ์, RTGS: Mom Ratchawong Narisa Chakkraphong).

Chakrabongse is a founder of River Books Publishing (Bangkok, Thailand), an author and a co-author of many books and illustrated guides on history, art and culture of Thailand and Southeast Asia. One of her most significant works is Katya and the Prince of Siam – a renowned book about the love of the Siamese Prince and a Ukrainian girl against a rich historical background of the beginning of the 20th century.

She is a founding president of the Green World Foundation opened in 1990 under the royal patronage of Princess Galyani Vadhana with a focus on environmental education.

== Childhood and education ==
Chakrabongse was born in London and spent her early years in her parents' house in Tredethy, Cornwall, England and in Bangkok. She was a late child, born after her parents, Prince Chula Chakrabongse and Elisabeth Hunter had been married for 18 years.

Chakrabongse's first languages were both English and Thai. She started her first school in Wadebridge, Cornwall. Her father, Prince Chakrabongse, died from cancer when she was just 7 years old. After this she started spending two terms a year at the Cornish school and one term at Chitralada School in the grounds of Chitralada Palace. She was in the same class as King Rama IX's youngest daughter, Princess Chulabhorn. There Chakrabongse also learnt ballet and Thai traditional dance.

When she turned 12 she went to a boarding school in Surrey, England and stopped the dual schooling system as it was becoming increasingly difficult.

Chakrabongse's mother died when she was 15 years old. Chakrabongse moved to London where she lived with her aunt. When she turned 16 she was accepted to St Paul's Girls' School in London, which was considered the best school for girls in England. At this school Narisa started to learn Russian for the first time.

After graduation, following the teachers' advice got Chakrabongse into SOAS London University to study Chinese language and culture. But soon enough she realized this is not what she wanted to do and changed to the Courtauld Institute to study History of Art at the most prestigious school teaching History of Art in England. Three years later Chakrabongse got her First Class Honours degree. She later got her master's degree at SOAS at Southeast Asian studies.

== Family ==
Chakrabongse married Allen Levy at the age of 24. Their son Hugo Chula Alexander Levy (Chulachak Chakrabongse) was born on 6 August 1981; now he is a musician and singer. From her second marriage with Korsvasti Svasti Thomson she has a son, Dominic Puwasawat Chakrabongse (born on 22 May 1991), a prominent environmental activist. She lives in London, and Bangkok where she has made Chakrabongse family house a historical boutique hotel. It is also often used as a venue for various cultural events such as the Bangkok Edge festival.

== Books ==
Chakrabongse is an author and a co-author of many books on her family history, as well as history and culture of Thailand and other South East Asian countries.

=== English language books ===
- Narisa Chakrabongse, Eileen Hunter. Katya & the Prince of Siam. River Books. 1995.
- Narisa Chakrabongse, Naengnoi Suksri. Palaces of Bangkok: Royal residences of the Chakri dynasty. Asia Books. 1996.
- Narisa Chakrabongse, Henry Ginsburg, Santanee Phasuk, and Dawn F. Rooney. Siam in trade and war: Royal maps of the nineteenth century. River Books. 2006.
- Narisa Chakrabongse, Naengnoi Suksri, and Thanit Limpanandhu. The Grand Palace and Old Bangkok. River Books. 2010.
- Narisa Chakrabongse, Worawat Thonglor. Riverside Recipes: Thai Cooking at Chakrabongse Villas. River Books. 2014.
- Narisa Chakrabongse. Letters from St. Petersburg - A Siamese Prince at the Court of the Last Tsar. River Books. 2017.

=== Russian translation ===
- Хантер Эйлин, Чакрабон Нариса. Катя и принц Сиама. – Городец, 2004. - 256 с.

=== Translation to English ===
- Narisa Chakrabongse has also translated several books into English. Buddhist Art by Gilles Beguin from French, The Roots of Thai Art by Piriya Krairœ̄k from Thai.

== Publishing ==
River Books was founded in 1989 to publish books on Southeast Asian art, history and culture. It is committed to recording and preserving unique and vanishing cultures, as well as celebrating the art and architecture of mainland Southeast Asia. Over the past few years it has also developed a fiction list, including novels written about Thailand in English and Thai literature in translation.

River Books publishes a few Thai-language books every year on similar subjects, as well as translations of out-of-print works by travelers in Southeast Asia. Working with acknowledged experts, River Books titles combine photography, design and production values.

As Chakrabongse says in Bangkok 101 interview, "Although it is hard work being a small publisher, it is very satisfying as each book is a new project and one meets so many interesting people."

== Green World Foundation ==
Green World Foundation was founded in 1990 by Chakrabongse, under the patronage of Her Royal Highness Princess Galyani Vadhana, with the aim to provide an easy access of knowledge on the Thai environment through various forms of media.

In the past decade, the foundation has shifted its focus to the urban environment, with a special emphasis on reconnecting city-dwellers with nature. This entails regular outdoor activities to promote awareness of urban biodiversity and their connection to urban health and resilience. One of the goals of the foundation is to make Bangkok a livable and resilient habitat, for humans and co-existing species.

== Chakrabongse Villas ==
Located in Bangkok, on the banks of the Chao Phraya River, Chakrabongse Villas & Residences were built as a retreat by Prince Chakrabongse in 1908. Today, the villa and gardens operate as a boutique hotel.

Chakrabongse Villas is a common venue for various cultural events. "We are collaborating with Museum Siam to organize a festival of art, literature, performance, music, and food called Bangkok edge. It's a lot of work, but we think we are well-placed to do something like that", says Narisa in her interview to Bangkok 101.

== Royal decorations ==
- Dame Grand Cross (First Class) of the Most Exalted Order of the White Elephant (1984)
- Dame Grand Cross (First Class) of the Most Noble Order of the Crown of Thailand (1979)
- Silver Medal (Seventh Class) of the Most Admirable Order of the Direkgunabhorn (2008)
