= Chula Chakrabongse =

Member of the Thai royal family (1908–1963)

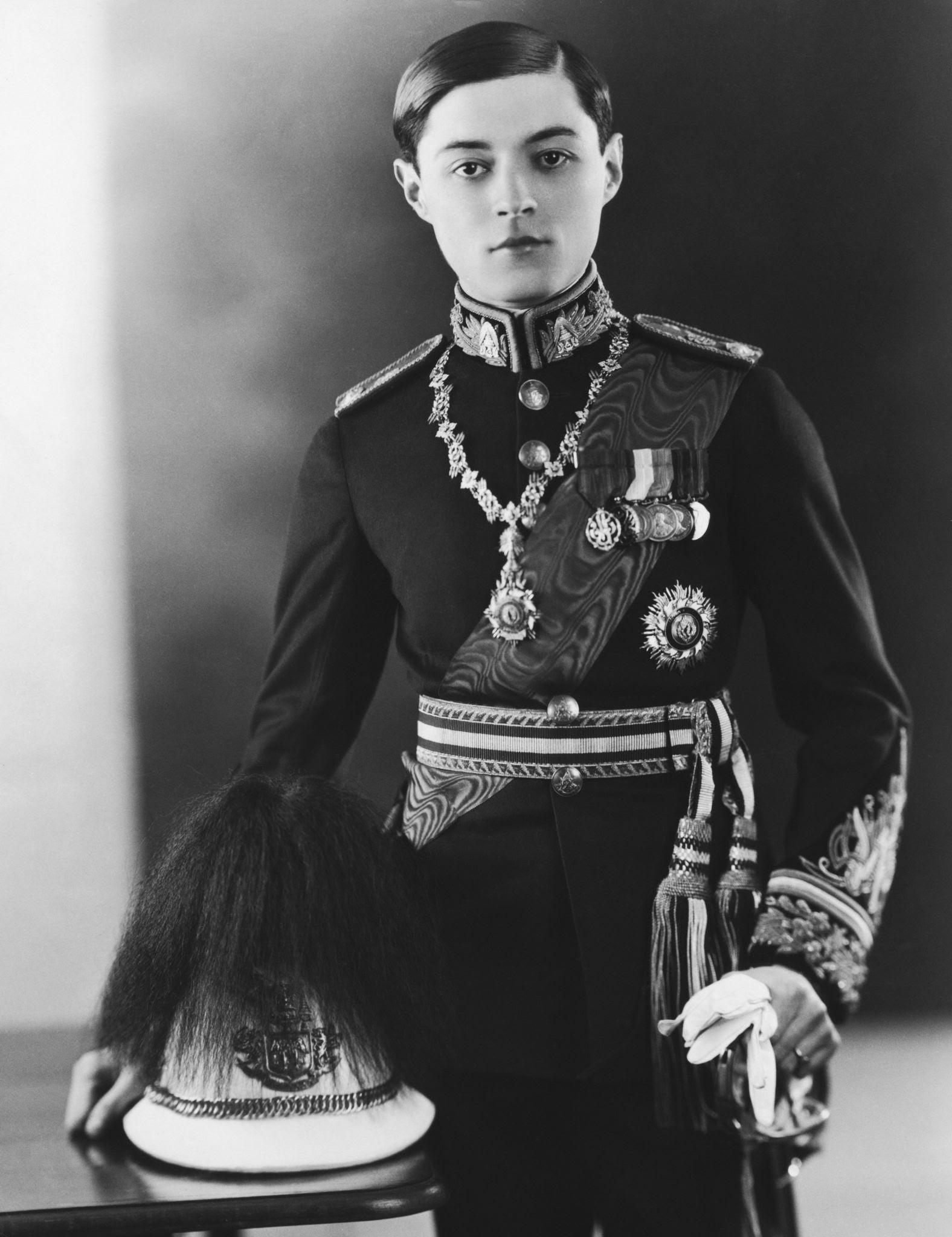
- Prince Chula Chakrabongse
- Born: 28 March 1908; Bangkok, Siam
- Died: 30 December 1963 (aged 55); Cornwall, England
- Spouse: Elisabeth Hunter (m. 1938)
- Issue: Narisa Chakrabongse
- House: Chakrabongse (Chakri)
- Father: Chakrabongse Bhuvanath
- Mother: Kateryna Desnytska
- Military career
- Allegiance: Thailand
- Branch: Royal Thai Army
- Rank: Major general

Chula Chakrabongse (Thai: จุลจักรพงษ์; RTGS: Chunlachakkraphong; 28 March 1908 – 30 December 1963), was a member of the Chakri dynasty of Thailand and of the House of Chakkraphong. He was the only child of Prince Chakrabongse Bhuvanath and his Ukrainian wife Kateryna Desnytska (later Mom Catherine Na Phitsanulok). He was a grandson of King Chulalongkorn.

== Early life and education ==
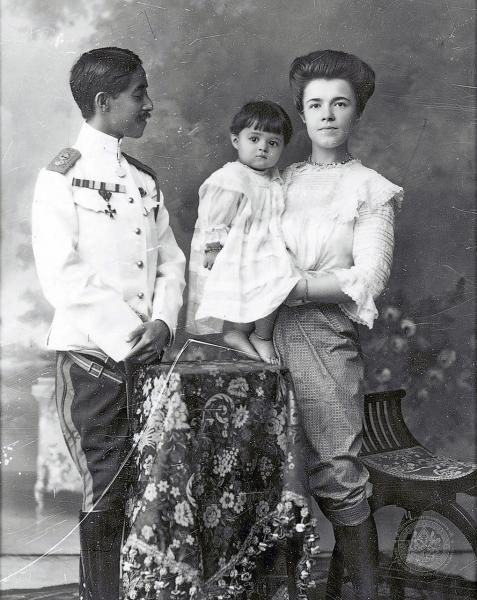
Chakrabongse Bhuvanath, Prince of Phitsanulok, Prince Chula Chakrabongse and Kateryna Ivanivna Desnytska

Prince Chula Chakrabongse was born on 28 March 1908 in Paruskavan Palace, Bangkok, with the title Mom Chao (His Serene Highness). Saovabha Phongsri, his grandmother, gave him the name Phongchak (พงษ์จักร; RTGS: Phongchak). Later his uncle, King Vajiravudh, raised him the higher rank of Phra Chao Worawong Thoe Phra Ong Chao (His Royal Highness Prince) and changed his name to Chula Chakrabongse. Palace officials affectionately called him "the Little Prince" (ท่านพระองค์หนู, Than Phra Ong Nu).

When very young, Prince Chula was sent to study in the United Kingdom, where he spent his teenage years, attending Harrow School. He graduated with Bachelor and Master from Trinity College, University of Cambridge.

There is a granite drinking bowl at Mitcham's Corner in Cambridge, donated in 1934 in memory of Prince Chula's dog Tony.

== Possibility of crown ==
King Prajadhipok (Rama VII) abdicated in 1935 due to political quarrels with the new quasi-democratic government as well as health problems. The king decided to abstain from exercising his prerogative to name a successor to the throne. By that time, the crown had already passed from Prince Mahidol's line to that of his half-brother's when his eldest full brother, Crown Prince Maha Vajirunhis, died as a teenager during King Chulalongkorn's reign. A half-brother, Prince Vajiravudh (as the next eldest) replaced Prince Vajirunhis as the crown prince. He eventually succeeded to the throne in 1910 as King Rama VI. In 1924 the king instituted the Palace Law of Succession in order to govern subsequent successions. The law gave priority to the children of his mother Queen Regent Saovabha Phongsri over the children of King Chulalongkorn's two other royal wives. The law was enacted on the death of King Vajiravudh in 1925 and the crown passed to his youngest brother, Prince Prajadhipok of Sukhothai.

Offering the throne to Prince Prajadhipok was not without a debate. In doing so, another candidate was bypassed: Prince Chula Chakrabongse, son of the late Field Marshal Prince Chakrabongse Bhuvanath of Phitsanulok, who before his death had been the heir-apparent to King Vajiravudh. It was questioned whether the Succession Law enacted by King Vajiravudh actually barred Prince Chakrabongse Bhuvanath (and for that matter, Prince Chula Chakrabongse) from succession on the grounds that he married a foreigner. However, his marriage had taken place before this law was enacted and had been endorsed by King Chulalongkorn himself. There was no clear resolution, but in the end the many candidates were passed over and Prince Prajadhipok was enthroned.

When King Prajadhipok later abdicated, since he was the last remaining son of Queen Saovabha, the crown went back to the sons of the queen whose rank was next to hers: Queen Savang Vadhana, mother of the late Crown Prince Vajirunahis. Besides the late crown prince, she had two more sons who survived to adulthood: Prince Sommatiwongse Varodaya of Nakhon Si Thammarat, who had died without a son in 1899, and Prince Mahidol who, although deceased, had two living sons. It thus appeared that Prince Ananda Mahidol would be the first person in the royal line of succession.

Nevertheless, the same debate over the half-foreign Prince Chula Chakrabongse occurred again. It was argued that King Vajiravudh had virtually exempted the prince's father from the ban in the Succession Law, and the crown might thus be passed to him.

However, since the kingdom was now governed under a constitution, it was the cabinet that would decide. Opinion was split on the right to succession of Prince Chula Chakrabongse. A key figure was Pridi Banomyong, who persuaded the cabinet that the Law should be interpreted as excluding the prince from succession, and that Prince Ananda Mahidol should be the next king. It also appeared more convenient for the government to have a monarch who was only nine years old and studying in Switzerland. On 2 March 1935, Prince Ananda Mahidol was elected by the National Assembly and the Thai government to succeed his uncle, King Prajadhipok, as the eighth king of the Chakri dynasty.

== Later life ==
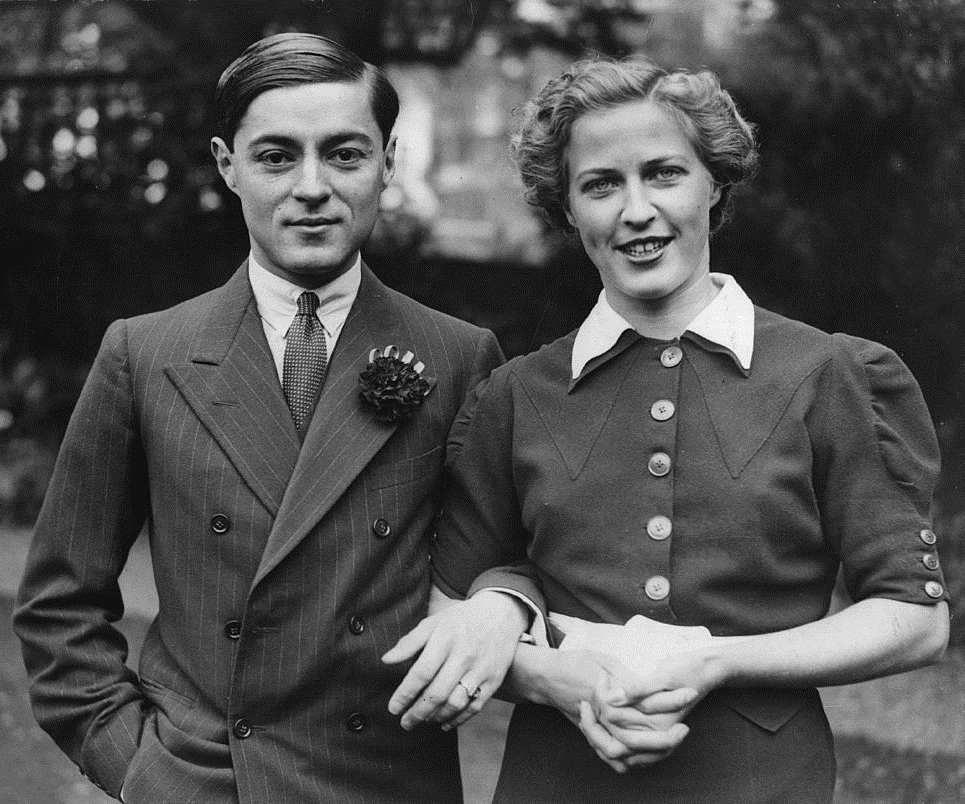
Prince Chula with Elizabeth Hunter in 1936

In 1938 he married Elizabeth Hunter, an English woman (known as Lisba). Their daughter, Mom Rajawongse Narisa Chakrabhongse, was born in 1956. They lived at Tredethy, St Mabyn, in Cornwall, in the 1940s and 1950s.

When Prince Chula's cousin Prince Birabongse Bhanudej ("B. Bira") went to England in 1927, Chula was supervising a racing team called White Mouse Racing. Prince Bira decided to drive for him.

In 1936 Chula's White Mouse team purchased an ERA for Bira, and he quickly became one of the leading exponents of this class of international racing. Bira's partnership with Chula ended in late 1948.

Prince Chula was the author of thirteen books, including a history of the Chakri dynasty, a biography about the race-car driver Richard Seaman and an autobiography. One notable book Prince Chula wrote in 1935, “Wheels At Speed,” recorded his cousin Bira's first try as a race-car driver. The book was originally intended as a book for only friends and family, but after a few copies went public, interest in the book, increased. Publishers G. T. Foulis re-issued the book ten years after it was first written. MG aficionados will enjoy Wheels at Speed.

== Death ==
Prince Chula died of cancer in 1963 at the age of 55.

== Honours ==
=== Thai ===
- Knight of The Most Illustrious Order of the Royal House of Chakri (19 February 1933)
- Knight Grand Cordon (Special Class) of The Most Illustrious Order of Chula Chom Klao
- Knight Grand Cordon (Special Class) of the Order of the White Elephant
- Knight Grand Cordon (Special Class) of the Order of the Crown of Thailand
- King Rama VI Royal Cypher Medal, Third Class
- King Rama VII Royal Cypher Medal, First Class
- King Rama VIII Royal Cypher Medal, First Class
- King Rama IX Royal Cypher Medal, First Class

=== Foreign ===
- Grand Cross of the Order of the White Lion (Czechoslovakia, 20 January 1938)
- Honorary Knight Grand Cross of the Royal Victorian Order (United Kingdom, 2 February 1938)
- Recipient of Queen Elizabeth II Coronation Medal (United Kingdom, 2 June 1953)
- Associate Officer Brother of the Order of St John (United Kingdom, 15 January 1960)

=== Arms ===
Coat of arms of Prince Chula Chakrabongse
Coronet The Chada pin Jigha (coronet) named "Jata Maha Kathin" (A royal crown for the great Kathina festival). Escutcheon Tierced per pall reversed. Orange dexter chief with Or Great Crown of Victory. Rose sinister chief with a Phra kiao (coronet) with halo on top of pillow. Purpure base with a chakram and a baton. Symbolism This is a derivative version of the Coat of arms of Chakrabongse Bhuvanath, the Prince of Phitsanulok. The Great Crown of Victory with a rays of light emitting from the top and a Urna on an orange field represents Prince Chula Chakrabongse is a great-grandson of King Mongkut who was born on Wednesday. Phra kiao (coronet) with halo on top of pillow on a pink field represents the Prince is a grandson of King Chulalongkorn who was born on Tuesday. A chakram and a baton read in Thai language as "Chak-Krabong" (จักร-กระบอง) which sound alike the name "Chakrabongse" ("จักรพงษ์" /Chak-Kra-Phong/) of Prince Chakrabongse Bhuvanath. The name Chakrabongse derives from a Sanskrit word Cakravamsa which mean "a descendant of the god Vishnu, the one who hold a Chakram as his weapon". The god also use a Gada (a type of club, mace or baton) which called Krabong (กระบอง) or Tabong (ตะบอง) in Thai language as his weapon as well. This is the emblem of his descendants in the name of the House of Chakrabongse. In addition, the name of prince Chula Chakrabongse means "little Chakrabongse". Purpure base mean the Prince was born on Saturday, same day to his father. Other versions

== Works ==
Autobiography

- Chula Chakrabongse (1989). Koet Wang Parut เกิดวังปารุสก์ [Born in Parut Palace] (PDF) (in Thai) (10th ed.). Bangkok: Phitsanulok Publishing. ISBN 9748693856. Archived from the original (PDF) on 14 October 2020.
- Chula Chakrabongse (1957). The Twain Have Met: Or, an Eastern Prince Came West. Foulis. OCLC 11760365.

Other works

- Chula Chakrabongse (1993). Chao Chiwit Sayam Kon Yuk Prachathipatai เจ้าชีวิตสยามก่อนยุคประชาธิปไตย [Siamese Lords of Life Prior to Democratic Age] (PDF) (in Thai) (4th ed.). Bangkok: River Books. ISBN 9748358844.
- Chula Chakrabongse (1945). Dick Seaman, Racing Motorist (4th ed.). G. T. Foulis & Company.
- Chula Chakrabongse (1967). Lords of Life: A History of the Kings of Thailand. Alvin Redman.
- Chula Chakrabongse (writing as Prince Chula of Siam). (1946). Road Racing 1936: Being an Account of One Season of B. Bira, the Racing Motorist (2nd ed.). London: G. T. Foulis & Company.
