= National Intelligence Agency (Thailand) =

Thai governmental intelligence agency

- สํานักข่าวกรองเเห่งชาติ

Agency overview
- Formed: 1 January 1954; 72 years ago
- Type: Intelligence agency and Security agency
- Jurisdiction: Government of Thailand
- Headquarters: Paruskavan Palace Bangkok, Thailand
- Motto: Determination, devotion, discipline, sacrifice and dedicated to the nation and its people
- Annual budget: 717.8 million baht (FY2019)
- Minister responsible: Anutin Charnvirakul (PM)
- Agency executive: Tanat Suwannanon, Director
- Parent agency: Office of the Prime Minister
- Website: Official website

The National Intelligence Agency (NIA) (Thai: สํานักข่าวกรองเเห่งชาติ) is the national civilian intelligence and security agency of Thailand tasked with advancing national security through collecting and analyzing intelligence from around the world and conducting clandestine and covert operations. It serves as part of the Office of the Prime Minister (OPM). Its headquarters is in Paruskavan Palace, Bangkok.

Operating under the National Intelligence Act, the National Intelligence Agency (NIA) serves as the nation's central intelligence authority and constitutes one of the three core pillars of the Thailand Intelligence Community, alongside the Armed Forces Security Center (AFSC) and the Royal Thai Police Special Branch Bureau (SBB). The agency holds a statutory mandate to coordinate all intelligence activities, analyze and develop intelligence systems, and safeguard both internal and external national security. Its extensive purview encompasses intelligence gathering and threat evaluation, clandestine and covert operations, counterintelligence, intelligence-led counterterrorism, political warfare against foreign adversaries, and hybrid threat mitigation. Furthermore, the NIA is responsible for protective intelligence—specifically safeguarding the Prime Minister and high-ranking government officials from assassination or assault. In managing the civilian security apparatus, the agency is tasked with establishing a civilian security intelligence network, protecting classified civilian government assets, and implementing robust cybersecurity measures to prevent systemic data breaches. To execute these critical duties, the Director of the NIA reports directly to the Prime Minister of Thailand and the National Security Council (NSC).

== History ==
Paruskavan Palace, Headquarter of NIA in 1930

On 1 January 1954, the Thai government established the Department of State Intelligence under the Council of Ministers of Thailand. Phao Sriyanond, then Director-General of the Royal Police Department was appointed as the first Director-General of the new department.

Later, during the tenure of Sarit Thanarat, the Department of Administrative Intelligence was renamed the Department of Central Intelligence on December 2, 1959. It was renamed again under the premiership of Prem Tinsulanonda as the National Intelligence Agency on August 30, 1985. Since then, it has served as the national intelligence agency directly under the Office of the Prime Minister.

In 1985, the "National Intelligence Act, B.E. 2528 (1985)" made the NIA the lead Thai intelligence agency. The reality as of 2016 was that seven Thai intelligence agencies—the National Intelligence Agency (NIA), Armed Forces Security Center (AFSC), Army Military Intelligence Command (AMIC), Naval Intelligence Department (NID), Directorate of Intelligence, RTAF (INTELLRTAF), Internal Security Operations Command (ISOC), and Special Branch Bureau (SBB)—mostly function independently of one another. In 2017, a plan was hatched to consolidate the efforts of 27 separate Thai intelligence agencies.

In 2019, the government implemented the "National Intelligence Act, B.E. 2562 (2019)," which marked a significant milestone. This act established the National Intelligence Coordination Center (NICC) as an agency within the National Intelligence Agency. The NICC's primary responsibility is to serve as a central hub for coordinating intelligence gathering and counterintelligence efforts with other domestic intelligence agencies and also public authorities.

== Missions ==
The National Intelligence Agency has mission, authority and responsibility in 4 areas including:

- Civil Security;
- Communication, technique, and network intelligence;
- Internal and foreign counterintelligence missions;
- Internal and foreign intelligence missions.

== Budget ==
The FY2019 budget of the NIA is 717.8 million baht.
