= Paruskavan Palace =

Historic mansion in Bangkok

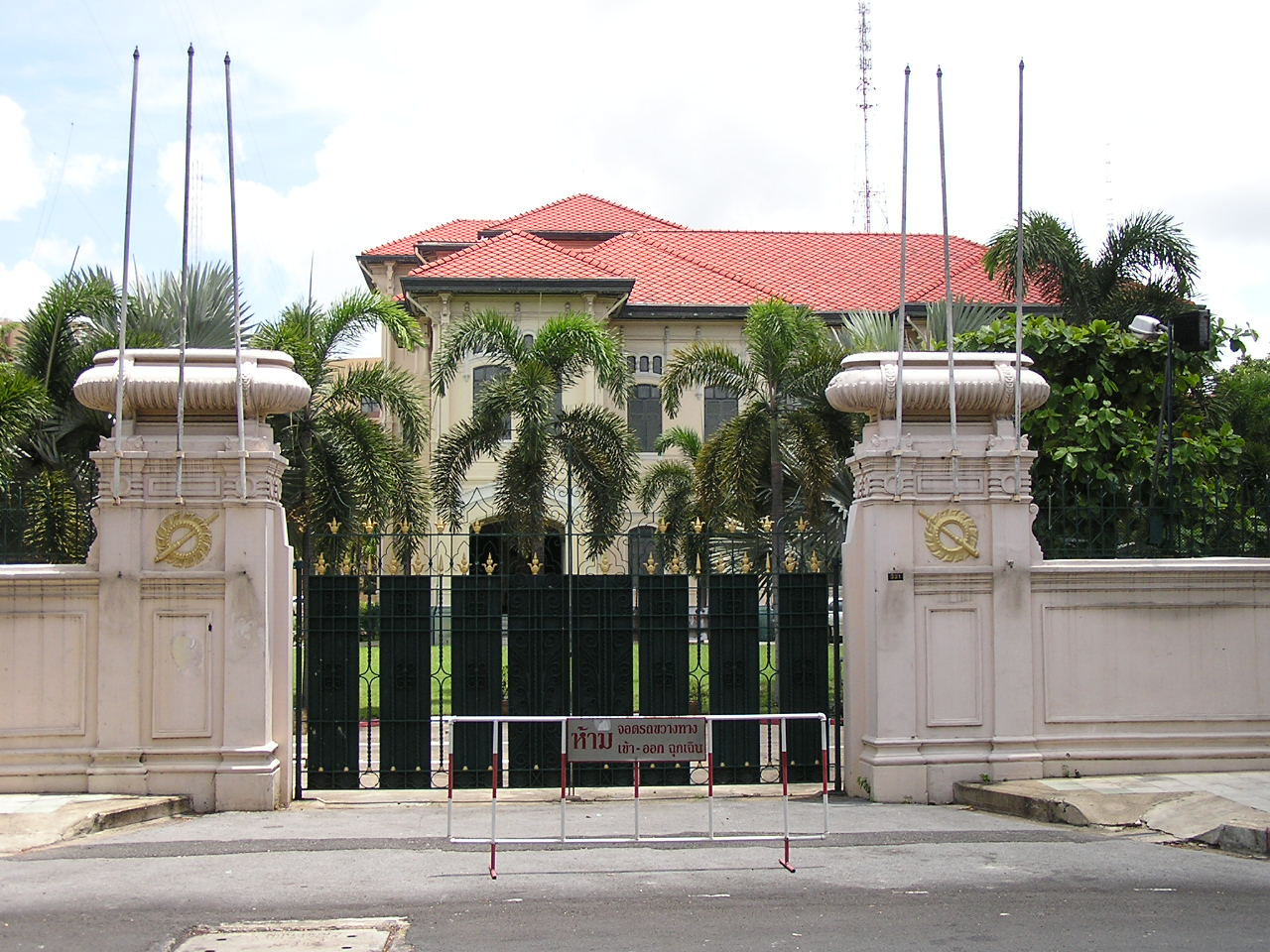
Paruskavan mansion

Paruskavan Palace (Thai: วังปารุสกวัน) is a historic mansion in Bangkok. The house was built for King Chulalongkorn's son, Prince Chakrabongse Bhuvanath and his Ukrainian wife (Kateryna Desnytska or Catherine Desnitski), upon his return after finishing his studies in Russia. Immediately after his return, he was appointed Commandant of the Military College.

For his residence, he was given Paruskavan Palace near Amphorn Sathan Residential Hall, where the King lived. According to "Katya & The Prince of Siam" "the construction of Paruskavan Palace had in fact been begun in 1903 with 22,075 baht being paid for walls of 275 metres in length on 30 December. On 19 April 1904, 61,173 baht was paid upon completion of the walls excluding the roof. Originally three architects were involved but two became ill during the course of work (Mr Tamayo got cholera and had to return to Europe while Mr Scos got smallpox and died). This left Beyrolepi in charge until the work was finished at the end of 1905."

Ekaterina Desnitskaya (Katya) designed the beautiful gardens of the Palace as well as redecorating it to include Western-style sofas and armchairs with a combination of Eastern materials.

Prince and Katya's son Prince Chula Chakrabongse was born on 28 March 1908. After the divorce of the Prince and Katya in 1919, the King ordered the Paruskavan to be returned to the Crown.

According to the Thai Government "When King Prajadhipok, King Rame VII, promulgated a constitution on 10 December 1932 and appointed Phraya Manopakorn Nititada as Prime Minister under the new constitution, his place of work continued to remain at the Ananta Samakhom Throne Hall. On 21 June 1933, General Phraya Phahonphonphayuhasena (Phot Phahonyothin) assumed the premiership.

The Prime Minister's Office was moved to Paruskavan Palace which had already been seized by the people who were responsible for bringing political changes to the country. Furthermore, it was the residence of General Phraya Phahonphonphayuhasena. Initially, the office was alternately known as Paruskavan Palace and the Prime Minister's Office, Paruskavan Palace. Later, however, it was known only by the latter name. When Field Marshal Plaek Phibunsongkhram became Prime Minister on 16 December 1938, the Prime Minister's Office was relocated to Suan Kularb Palace which was near Paruskavan Palace."

Currently used as the headquarters of the National Intelligence Agency; Museums of Police Department and Metropolitan Police Bureau.
