= St Mabyn =

Village in Cornwall, England

Coordinates: 50.526°N 4.764°W

St Mabyn: Cornish: S. Mabon
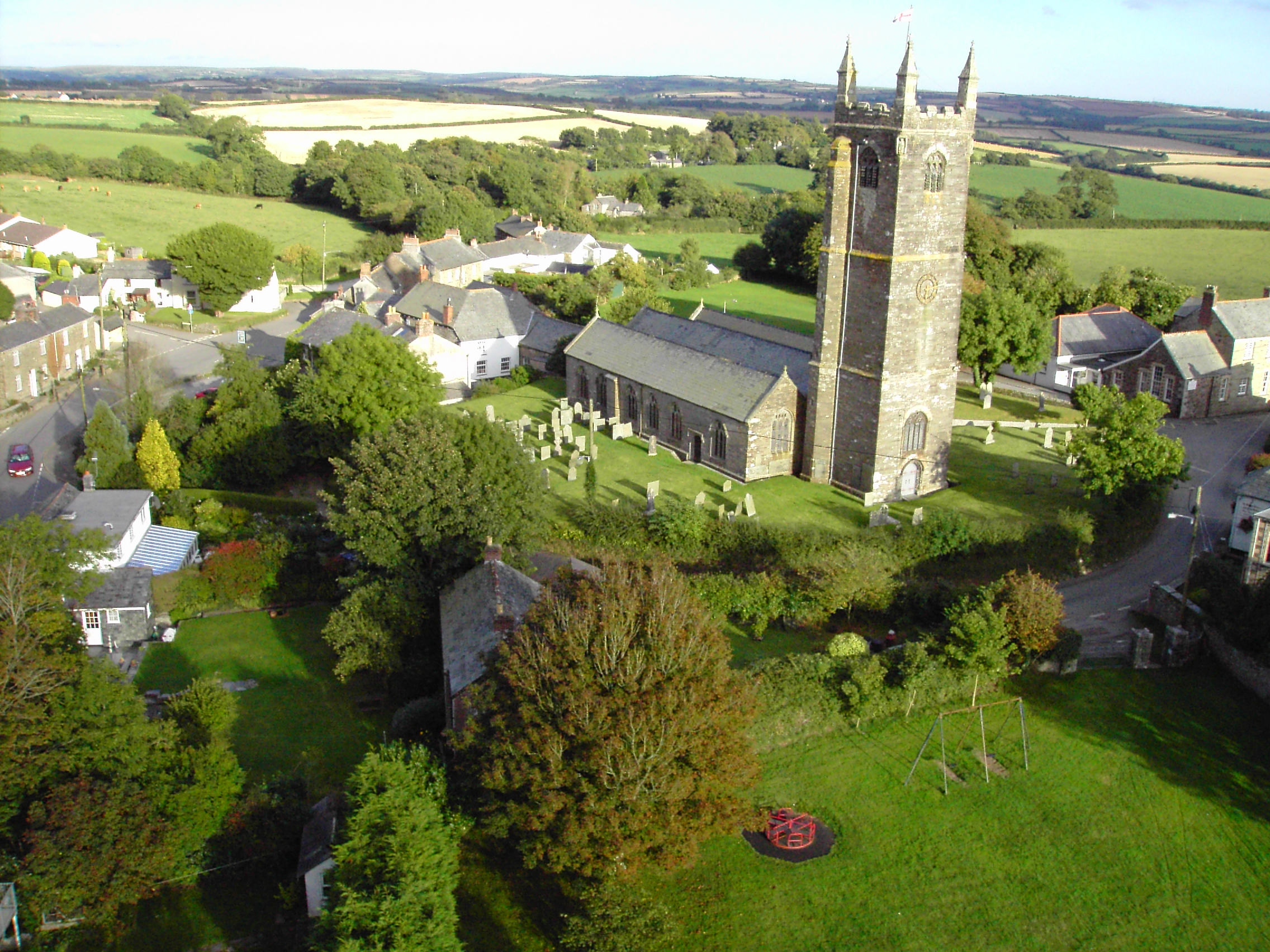
- Aerial view of St Mabyn

- Location within Cornwall
- Population: 628
- OS grid reference: SX041732
- Civil parish: St Mabyn
- Unitary authority: Cornwall
- Ceremonial county: Cornwall
- Region: South West
- Country: England
- Sovereign state: United Kingdom
- Post town: BODMIN
- Postcode district: PL30
- Dialling code: 01208
- Police: Devon and Cornwall
- Fire: Cornwall
- Ambulance: South Western
- UK Parliament: North Cornwall

St Mabyn (Cornish: S. Mabon) is a civil parish and village in Cornwall, England, United Kingdom. The village is situated three miles (5 km) east of Wadebridge. The parish includes a hamlet called Longstone to the east and many small manor houses, including Tregarden, Tredethy, Helligan Barton and Colquite, all built in the 16th and 17th centuries. The area of the parish is 4,101 acres (16.60 km^{2}).

== Etymology ==
The parish is traditionally named after Saint Mabyn or Mabena, said to have been one of the 24 children of Brychan, a Welsh saint and King of Brycheiniog in the 5th century. Sabine Baring-Gould however suggests that the true founder of St Mabyn's Church was actually the male Welsh saint Mabon, and the attribution to a female Mabyn came about after the true history had been lost. Davies Gilbert asserts that the name derives from the Cornish compound word Mab-in, meaning 'son'.

The first recorded mention of the village was in 1234 when it was spelt Sancto Malbano, The ma... prefix can mean ‘place’.

== Demography ==
The population in 2001 was 560 persons, exactly the same as in 1811, having declined from 595 in 1991. Population in 2011 was 628.

In 2013 the proportion of dwellings that were second homes or holiday accommodation was 10.1%.

== Geography ==
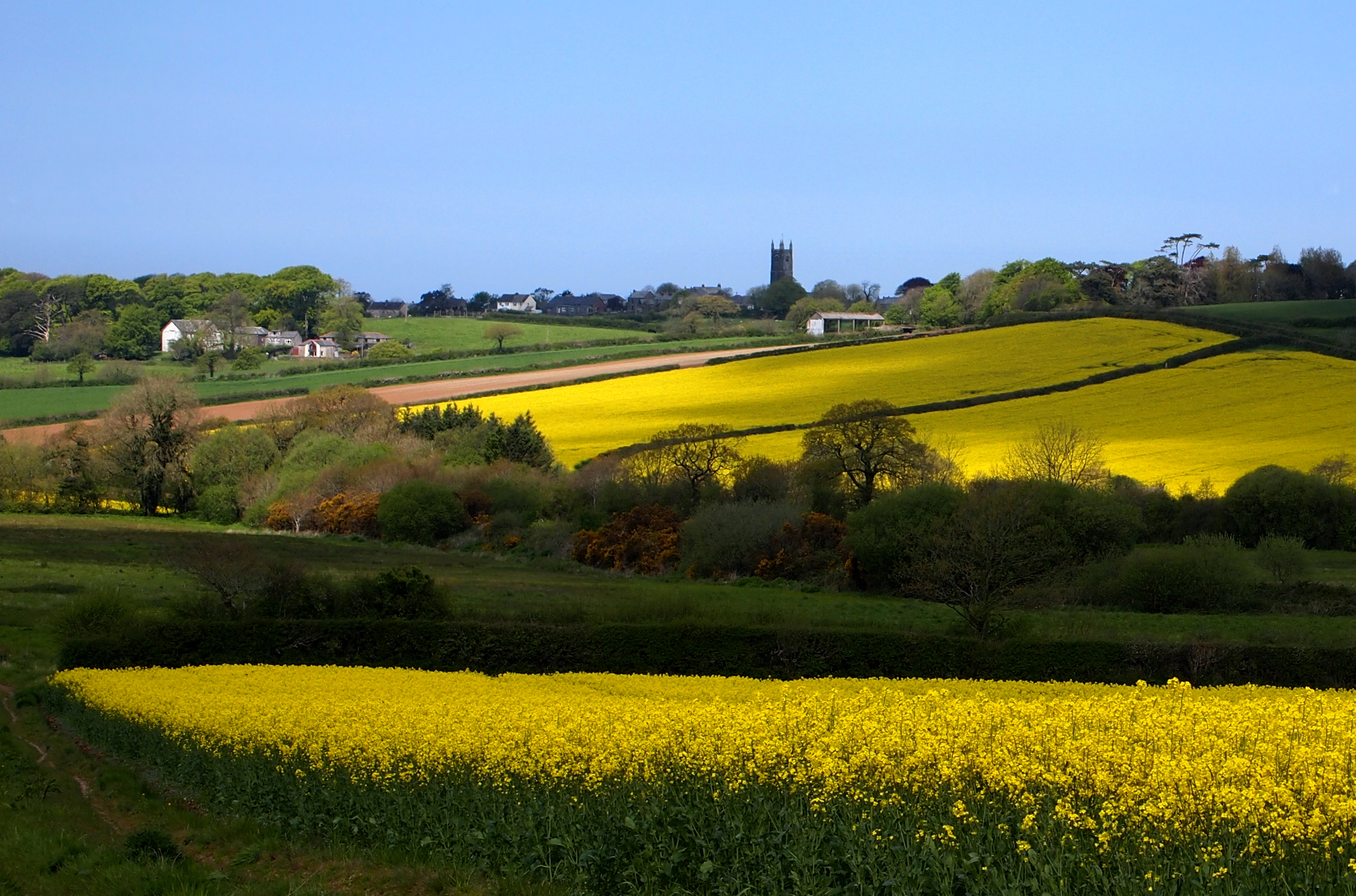
View of St Mabyn with fields of flowering rape

The village is centred on the Grade I listed 15th century St Mabyn Parish Church. Village amenities include a community shop and post office, a public house ‘St Mabyn Inn’ a village hall, a primary school, St Mabyn Church of England Primary School, a pre-school, a scout group, a garden club, and a Young Farmers' group. There is a King George's Field in memorial to King George V and a village green.

The village is surrounded by high quality, undulating farmland. The Allen valley to the north west contains a number of Cornish Nature Conservation Sites. Land to the south-east is designated as an open area of local significance. Four trees in the village are subject to preservation orders. The village has no connection to main sewerage and relies on septic tank drainage.

There was post-war development of local authority housing along Chapel Lane and Wadebridge Road. In the 1980s private housing schemes at Mabena Close and Meadow Court were completed and there was further ribbon development growth along Station Road. A residential development Greenwix Parc, comprising thirty five dwellings including 12 affordable units was completed by Midas Homes in 2011.

== Economy ==
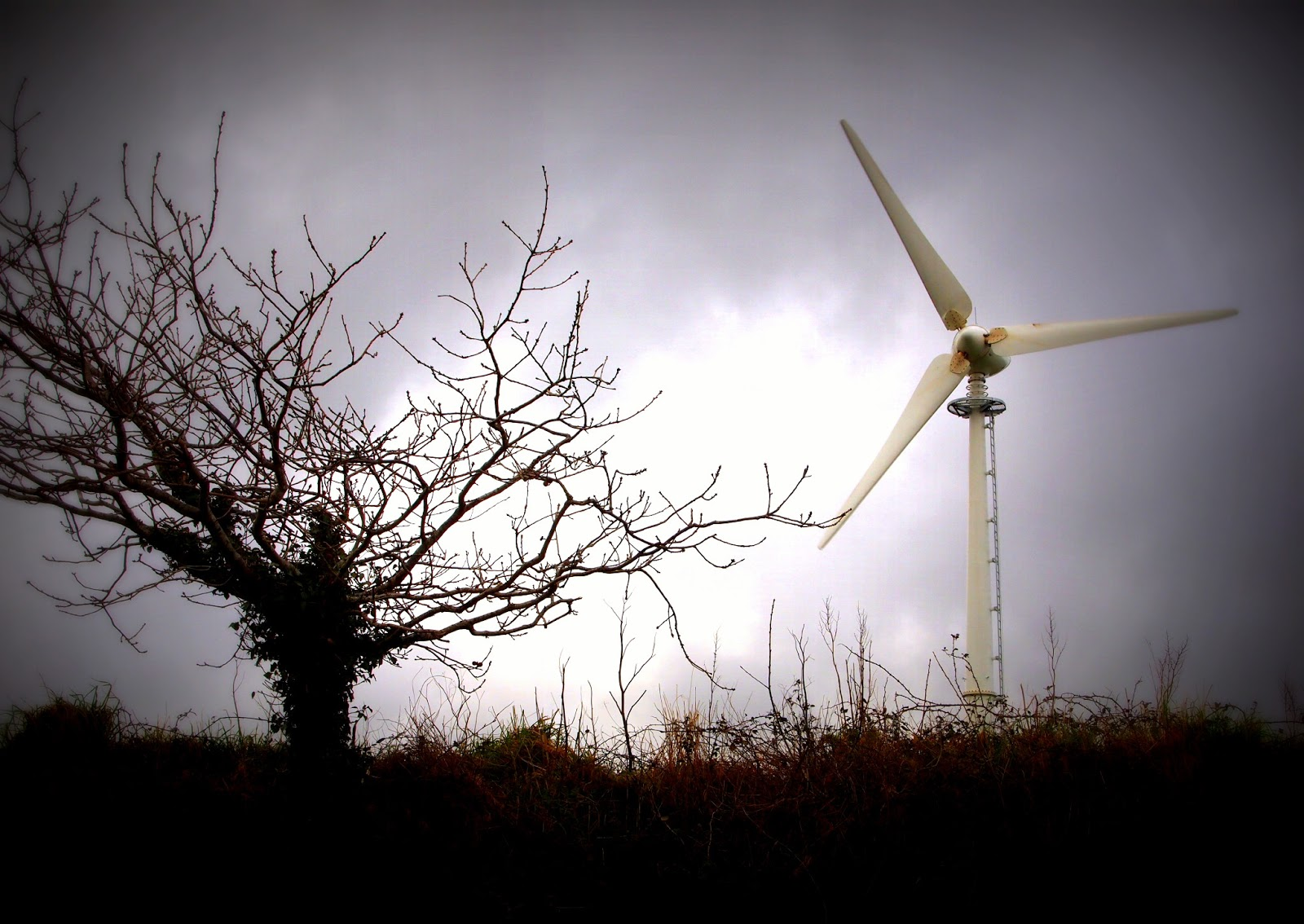
Wind turbine at Burlerrow Farm

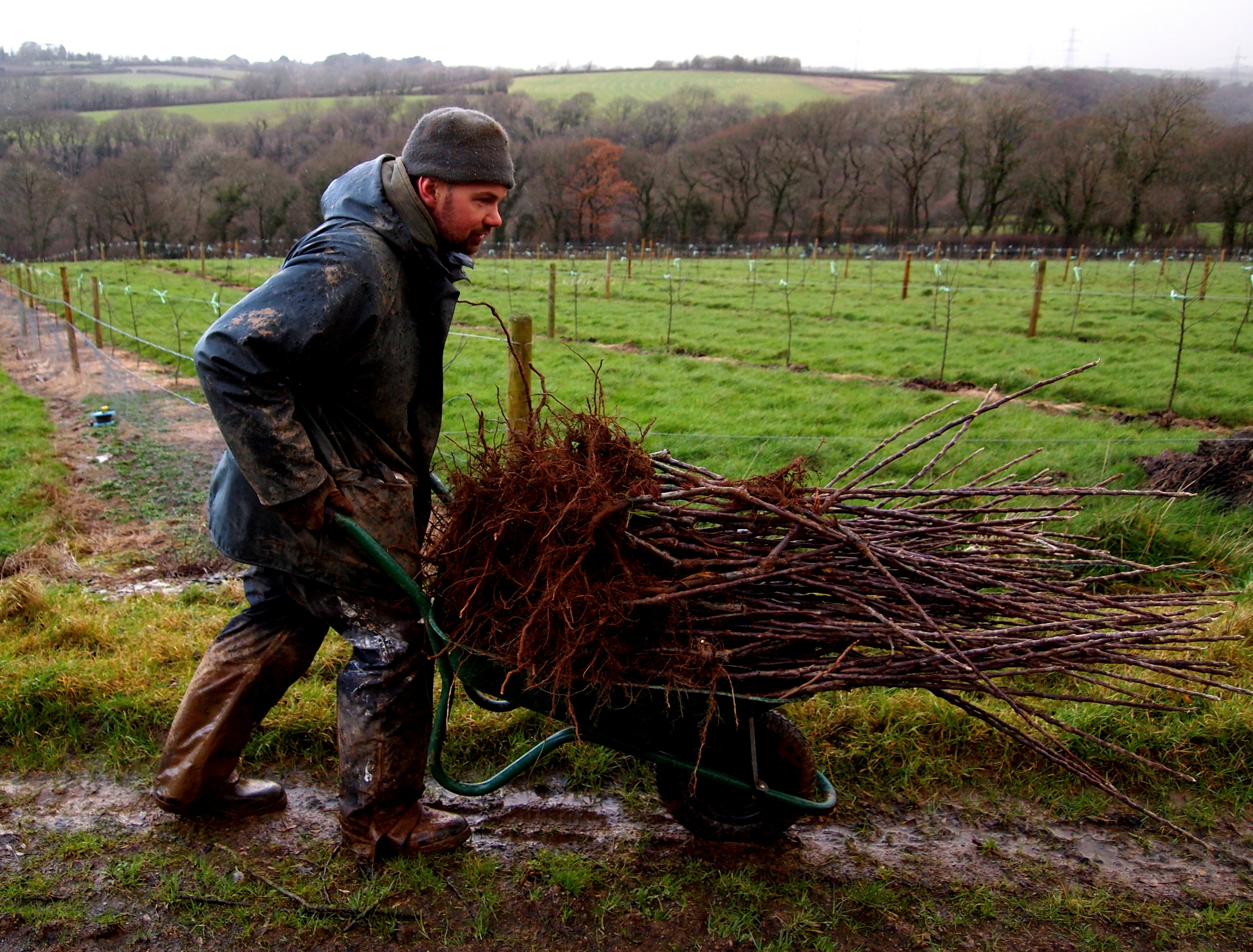
Tom Bray planting apple trees

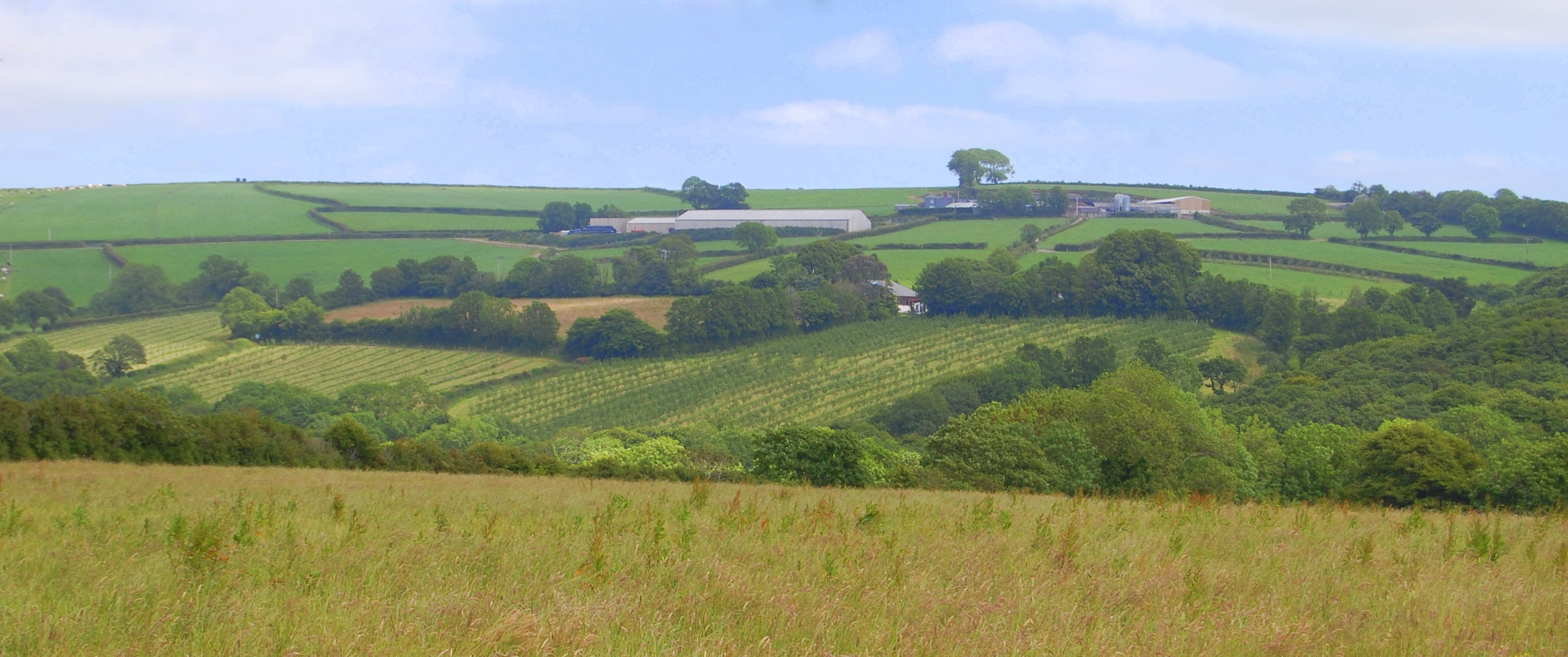
Haywood Farm orchards with Kellow's Farm in the background

The major economic activity in the parish is agriculture and the parish has several large farms. Most agriculture centres on dairying, with arable crops such as potato and rape and some raising of sheep.

James Mutton of Burlerrow Farm was the first farmer in Cornwall to receive a grant from the England Rural Development Programme this enabled him to process Miscanthus giganteus which is grown on his 750-acre farm and around the village, the crop is converted into livestock bedding. The farm generates its own electricity with an Endurance 50 kW wind turbine.

Andrew and Sally Kellow keep a large dairy herd at Treveglos Farm.

Tom Bray produces around 26,000 litres of traditional farm cider a year at Haywood Farm, where he has propagated 5,000 apple trees.

In 2018 with the village shop proposing to close, a community shop opened on the site of the old school dinner hut, previously a petrol station.

== Parish church ==
The church comprises a chancel and nave with north and south aisles. The arcades each comprise seven four-centred arches of granite, supported on monolith granite pillars with sculptured capitals of St Stephens porcelain stone. There is a south porch, a north door, and priest's door. The tower is 75 feet (23 m) high and has three stages. It has a parapet with pinnacles. The earliest recorded Priest-in-charge was Roger de Warlegan in 1267. Canon David John Elkington is the present incumbent.

== History ==
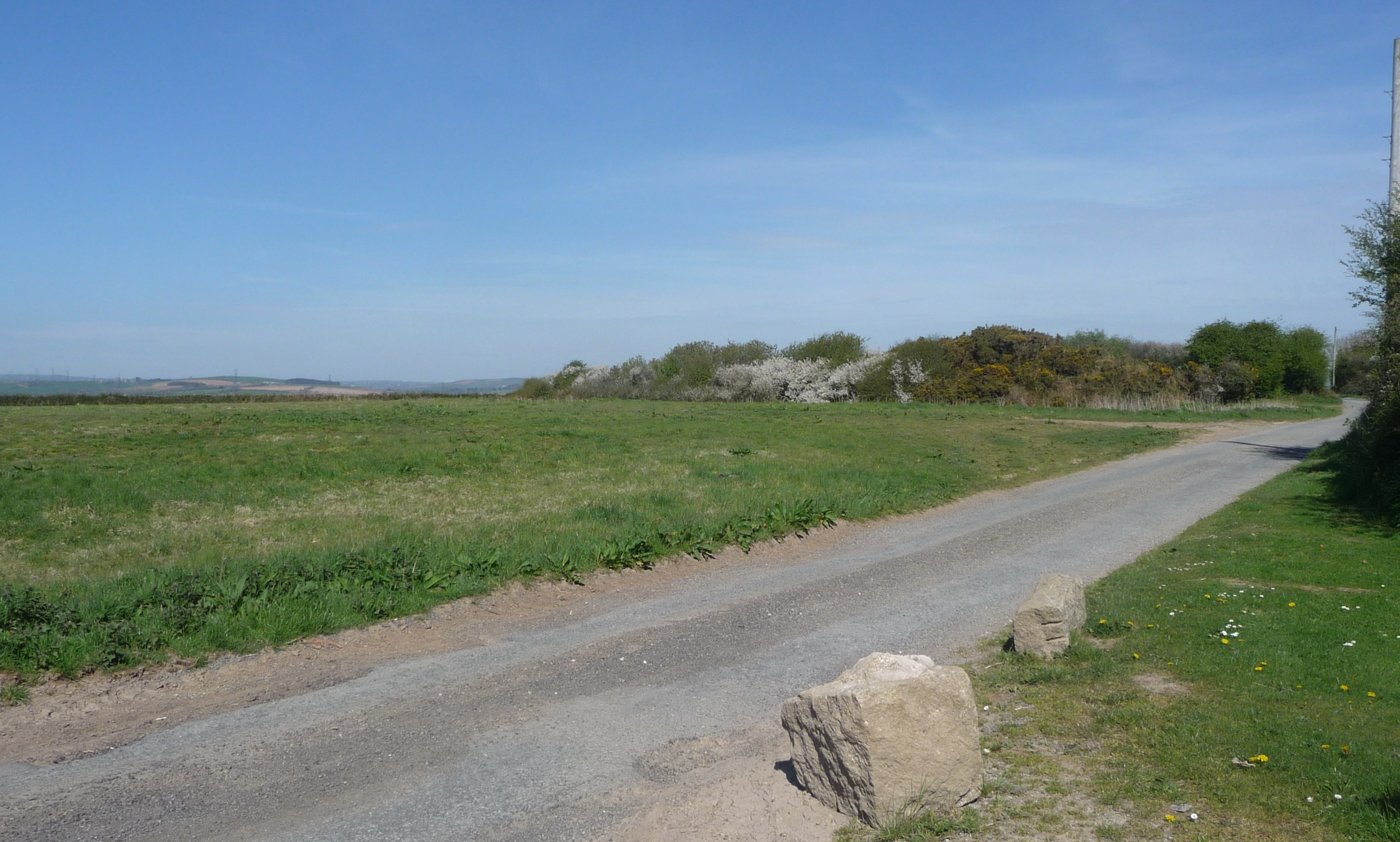
Kelly Rounds

The earliest signs of habitation are at the Iron Age hill fort of Kelly Rounds or Castle Killibury. Radiocarbon dating gives a date of occupation between 400 and 100 BC.

An archaeological excavation at Chapelfields in 2016 uncovered evidence of two domestic Romano British enclosures (AD 43 to 410), finds included a rare copper alloy brooch, Samian pottery dated AD 150–230 and a slate game piece. In January 2021 the Chapelfield site was subject to a second archaeological excavation which revealed finds including rotary querns, glass table ware and a large range of local and imported pottery.

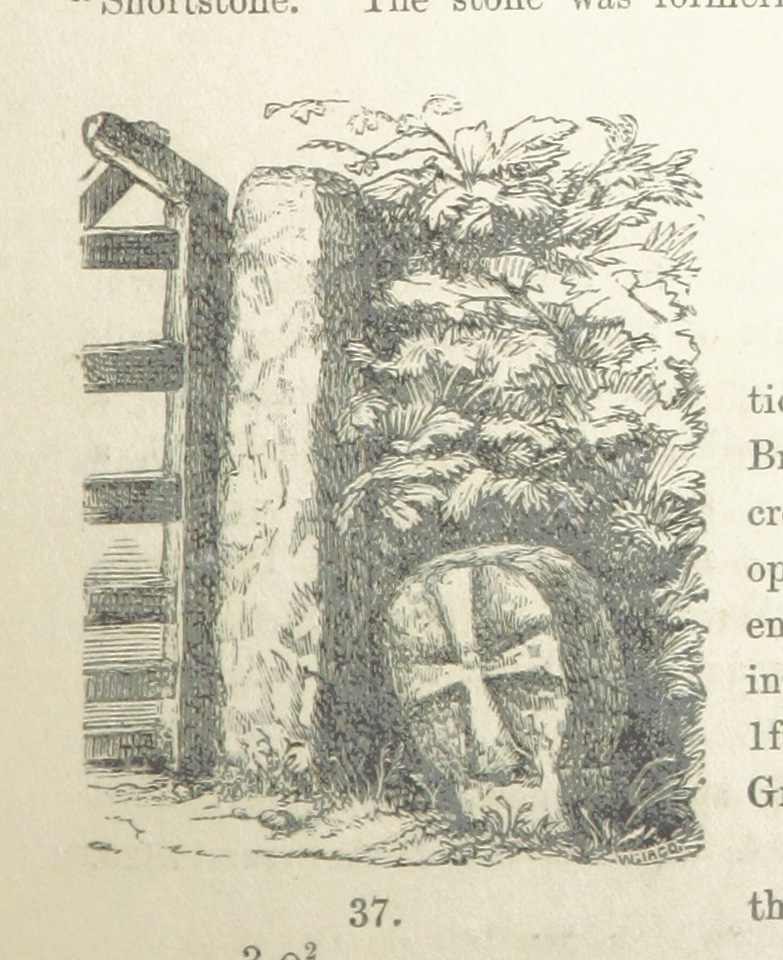
The cross at Cross Hill

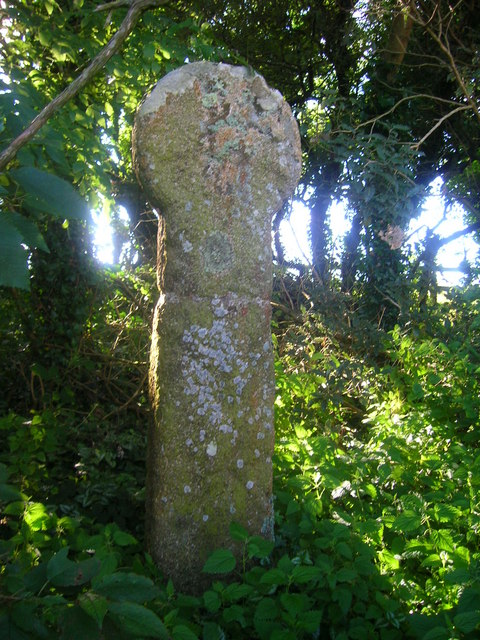
Penwine Cross

Arthur Langdon (1896) records four Cornish crosses in the parish: one in the churchyard and others at Colquite, Cross Hill and Penwine. The Penwine cross is at Longstone.

The parish was part of the ancient hundred of Triggshire. In the Domesday Book of 1086 this district was taxed under the jurisdiction of Treu-es-coit (translated as "town of the wood", now called Trevisquite). Trethevey in St Mabyn parish was a manor recorded in the Domesday Book as Tewardevi. Both manors were held by Richard from Robert, Count of Mortain. Trevisquite had land for 12 ploughs, 25 households, a mill, 20 acres of woodland and 50 of pasture; its value was 25 shillings a year. Trethevey had land only for one plough, 3 households and 30 acres of pasture; its value was only 2 shillings though it had formerly been 5 shillings. The St Mabyn Trethevey has the meaning "manorial centre on the river Dewey" (Ty war Duwy) unlike other Cornish places called Trethevy or Trethevey.

The inquisition of the bishops of Lincoln and Winchester in 1294 gave the Cornish benefice "Ecclesia de Maben in decanatu de Trig Minorshire" a rateable value of £8. In Cardinal Thomas Wolsey's inquisition of 1521 it is rated at £36.

Sir Richard Serjeaux of Colquite in St Mabyn became High Sheriff of Cornwall in 1389. Below Colquite House is the ruin of a manor house possibly of the late 15th century which may have been a first-floor hall house.

The Long Sentry field south east of the church, has been identified as the possible location of the most northerly Plain-an-gwarry or playing place (Cornish: Plen an Gwari) a Cornish Medieval amphitheatre it is mentioned in a church terrier of 1613 and 1679.

Grade II listed Dinham's Bridge, built in the early 19th century crosses over the River Allan on the parish boundary with St Kew parish.

=== Modern period ===
A United Methodist Free Church chapel was built with funding from Richard Hambly Andrew of Tredinnick in 1820 during the incumbency of Leveson-Gower but is now a private house.

St Mabyn's standing stone was broken up for gateposts in 1850 and the stump re-located to the crossroads at Longstone.

The main land owners in 1875, apart from the church, were The Viscount Falmouth, the Trustees of William Molesworth, John Tremayne from Heligan, the heirs of the late John Peter-Hoblyn, Francis John Hext and Mrs. Hooper and Richard Hambly Andrew. There was an annual fair held on 14 February.

In 2012 a parish councillor became the first in Cornwall to be disqualified from holding public office, and was banned for two years for bullying and showing disrespect to members.

== Cornish wrestling ==
Cornish wrestling tournaments for prizes were held in the old bowling green, adjoining the Old Inn, in St Mabyn churchtown.

== Notable residents ==
- Nicholas Kendall, a member of parliament and High Sheriff of Cornwall in 1847.
- Samuel Lawry, Methodist minister and administrator.
- Jill Murphy, children's author.
- Samuel Penhallow, an early American colonist emigrated in 1686 and settled in Portsmouth, New Hampshire USA.
- Tristan Stephenson, mixologist, drinks industry expert and director of Fluid Movement.
