= Samuel Lawry =

New Zealand Methodist minister and administrator

Samuel Lawry (22 August 1854 – 26 July 1933) was a New Zealand Methodist minister and administrator. He was born in St Mabyn, Cornwall, England on 22 August 1854.
