= Tredethy =

Country house in St. Mabyn, Cornwall, England

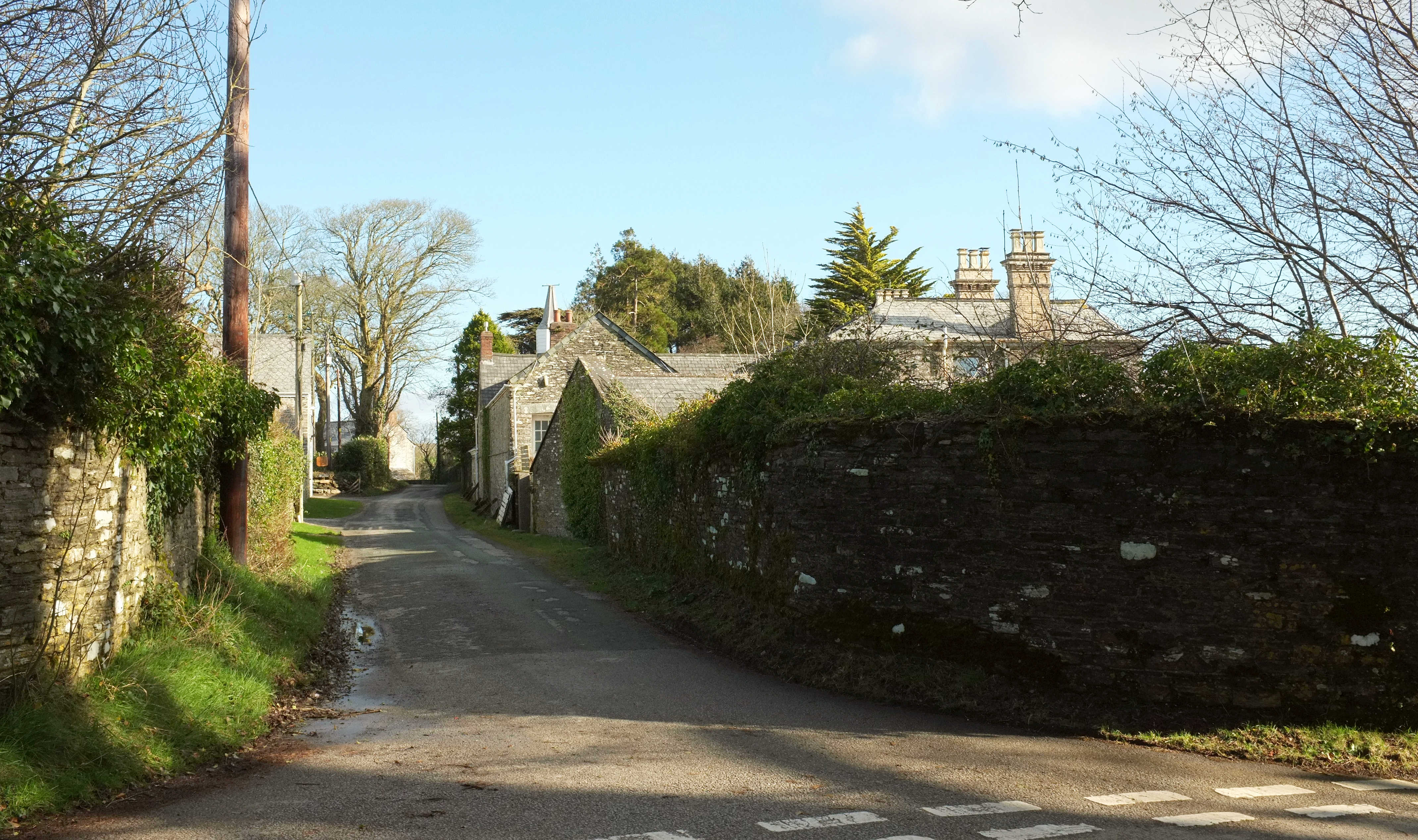
- Tredethy House

- Location within Cornwall
- 50.51371°N 4.73533°W
- Location: St Mabyn, Cornwall, England

Listed Building – Grade II
- Official name: Tredethy Country House Hotel
- Designated: 16 November 2010
- Reference no.: 1327967

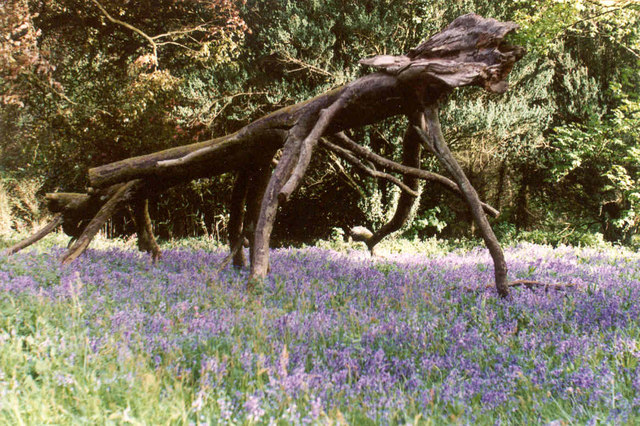
Wood at Tredethy

Tredethy is a house and estate in the civil parish of St Mabyn, Cornwall, UK, at Grid reference SX 06 71. It occupies seven acres and is one of a number of small manor houses in the parish all built in the 16th and 17th centuries. The house was extensively restored in 1892 by the prominent Cornish architect Silvanus Trevail.

This was the seat of the Rev. Charles Peters (1690–1774), a Hebrew scholar.

Later it became the home of Prince Chula Chakrabongse of Thailand who married Elizabeth Hunter, an English woman in 1938. Their daughter, Mom Rajawongse Narisa Chakrabhongse, was born in 1956. They lived at Tredethy in the 1940s and 1950s. At Bodmin there is an ornate granite drinking bowl which serves the needs of thirsty dogs at the entrance to Bodmin's Priory car park which was donated by Prince Chula. There is a similar granite drinking bowl at Mitchem’s Corner in Cambridge, donated in 1934 in memory of Prince Chula’s dog called Tony.

In the 1960s Tredethy was converted to a hotel with 11 en-suite bedrooms.
