= List of King George V Playing Fields in Cornwall =

Cornwall
Location	Formal name	Local name (if any)	National Grid Reference	Dates		External links
Location	Formal name	Local name (if any)	National Grid Reference	Purchase	Opening	External links
Delabole	King George V Playing Field		SX072842			
Gunnislake	King George V Playing Field		SX432716			
Helston	King George V Playing Field		SW664277			
Liskeard	King George V Playing Field		SX250647			
Lostwithiel	King George V Playing Field		SX100596			
Madron	King George V Playing Field		SW452320			
Probus	King George V Playing Field		SW898478			
St Mabyn	King George V Playing Field		SX039732			
Perranwell	King George V Playing Field		SW898478			
