= Ben Oliver (athlete) =

English wheelchair racer

Ben Oliver (born 17 October 1995) is the current Cornwall county record holder for the 100m and 400m Wheelchair racing.

Oliver who lives in Bodmin Cornwall started competing in the sport in 2013 and is ranked best in the world at 800 metres, having set a new European record. Oliver is classified as a T33 athlete for athletes who have Cerebral palsy and is studying Sports Coaching Science with Disability Sport at Worcester University.

Oliver is a former pupil of St Mabyn Church of England Primary School and Truro and Penwith College.

Oliver currently resides in Cornwall.
