= Longstone, Cornwall =

Hamlet in Cornwall, England

Coordinates: 50.5281°N 4.7371°W

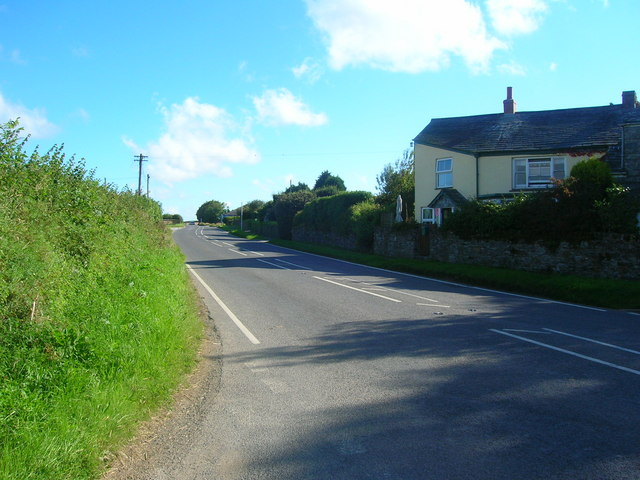
Longstone

Longstone is a hamlet in Cornwall, England, UK. It is part of the civil parish of St Mabyn, and is about one mile east of St Mabyn village on the B3266 road. It is named after the menhir which formerly stood here.

The "Longstone" was a standing stone which was broken up for gateposts around 1850. It was said to have been inscribed, thus making it early medieval.

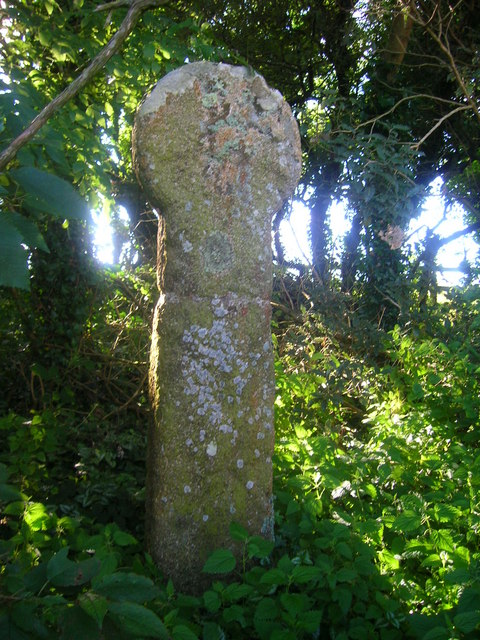
The medieval cross

There is however a later medieval cross by the crossroads. It consists of a medieval crosshead placed on a modern rough hewn shaft which has been set into a medieval moorstone slab base.

There was a Wesleyan Methodist chapel, built is 1872 and Sunday School, however, these have both been converted to private homes.

The hamlet previously had a garage, which has now been demolished to make way for a housing estate, 'Gwel an Menhir'.
