= Chakrabongse Bhuvanath =

Prince of Phitsanulok (1883–1920)

Chakrabongse Bhuvanath; จักรพงษ์ภูวนาถ
- Prince of Phitsanulok
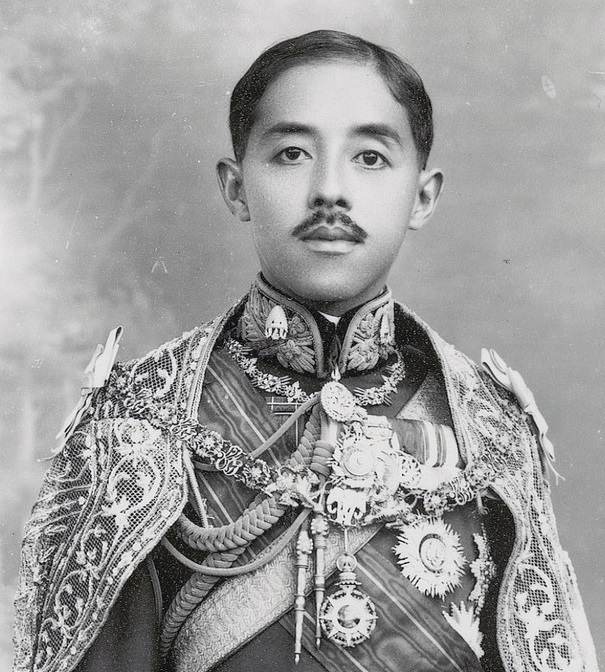
- Chakrabongse Bhuvanath c. 1910s
- Born: 3 March 1883; Bangkok, Siam
- Died: 13 June 1920 (aged 37); Bangkok, Siam
- Spouse: Kateryna Desnytska (m. 1906; div. 1919) Javalit Rabibadhana (m. 1919)
- Issue: Prince Chula Chakrabongse
- House: Chakrabongse (Chakri)
- Father: Chulalongkorn (Rama V)
- Mother: Saovabha Phongsri
- Military career
- Allegiance: Kingdom of Siam
- Branch: Royal Siamese Army
- Rank: Field marshal

Chakrabongse Bhuvanath (Thai: จักรพงษ์ภูวนาถ; RTGS: Chakkraphong Phuwanat; 3 March 1883 – 13 June 1920), was the 40th child of King Chulalongkorn and the fourth child of Queen Sri Bajarindra.

== Early life and education ==
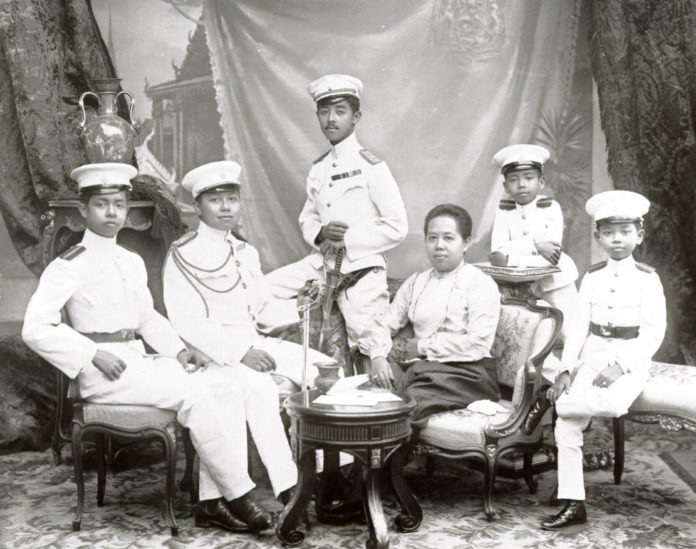
Queen Saovabha and her sons, circa 1900 (from left to right: Prince Asdang, Crown Prince Maha Vajiravudh, Prince Chakrabongse, Queen Saovabha, Prince Prajadhipok, and Prince Chudadhut)

The prince was sent to the Russian Empire in his teens, where he studied at the Page Corps and became an officer of His Majesty's Hussar Life Guards Regiment.

== Family ==
He returned to Siam with a wife, Catherine Desnitski from Lutsk (at that time part of the Russian Empire, nowadays part of Ukraine), whom he had married in 1906. The Prince and his wife lived with their son, Prince Chula Chakrabongse, in Paruskavan Palace in Bangkok. They later divorced and he remarried the year before his death.

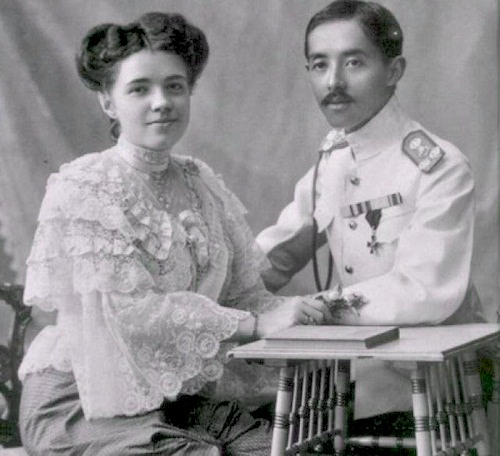
Desnitski and Chakrabongse in 1906

== Royal careers ==
The prince was a favourite son of both the King and Queen. He travelled extensively, visiting among other countries the US and United Kingdom in 1902. He also represented his father on foreign visits, such as for the funeral of King Umberto I of Italy in 1900, the wedding of Crown Prince Wilhelm and Crown Princess Cecilie of Prussia in 1905, and the coronation of King George V and Queen Mary of the United Kingdom in 1911.

He and his brother Prince Purachatra, Commander of the Army Engineers, were instrumental in the development of aviation in the Kingdom. Prince Chakrabongse is best remembered today as the father of the army's Royal Aeronautical Service, a forerunner to the Royal Thai Air Force.

Prince Chakrabongse also served as Chief of Staff of the Royal Siamese Army until his death.

== Death ==
He died from pneumonia in 1920 at the age of 37.

== Honours ==
Emblem of Chakrabongse Bhuvanath as a knight of the Order of the Seraphim

=== National honours ===
- Knight of the Most Illustrious Order of the Royal House of Chakri (1891)
- Knight of the Ancient and Auspicious Order of the Nine Gems (1894)
- Knight Grand Cordon (Special Class) of the Most Illustrious Order of Chula Chom Klao (1900)
- Member of the Ratana Varabhorn Order of Merit (1911)
- Knight Grand Commander (First Class) of the Honourable Order of Rama (1918)
- Knight Grand Cordon (Special Class) of the Most Exalted Order of the White Elephant (1913)
- Knight Grand Cordon (Special Class) of the Most Noble Order of the Crown of Thailand (1918)
- Dushdi Mala Medal for Arts (1903)
- Chakra Mala Medal (1914)
- King Rama IV Royal Cypher Medal, 2nd Class (1908)
- King Rama V Royal Cypher Medal, 1st Class (1908)
- King Rama VI Royal Cypher Medal, 1st Class (1910)

=== Foreign honours ===
- Denmark:
  - Knight of the Order of the Elephant (7 August 1911)
- Sweden:
  - Knight of the Order of the Seraphim (10 September 1911)

=== Arms ===
Coat of arms of the Prince of Phitsanulok
| Crest The Great Crown of Victory emitting from the top and the Emblem of the Chakri dynasty. Escutcheon Per fess, the chief per pale. Orange dexter chief with Or Great Crown of Victory. Rose sinister chief with a Phra kiao (coronet) with halo on top of pillow. Purpure base with a chakram and a baton. Symbolism A Great Crown of Victory with rays of light emitting from the top and a Urna on an orange field represents the Prince is a grandson of King Mongkut who was born on Wednesday. Phra kiao (coronet) with halo on top of pillow on a pink field represents the Prince is a son of King Chulalongkorn who was born on Tuesday. A chakram and a baton read in Thai language as "Chak-Krabong" (จักร-กระบอง) which sounds like his name "Chakrabongse" ("จักรพงษ์" /Chak-Kra-Phong/). The name Chakrabongse derives from a Sanskrit word Cakravamsa which means "a descendant of the god Vishnu, the one who hold a Chakram as his weapon". The god also uses a Gada (a type of club, mace or baton) which is called Krabong (กระบอง) or Tabong (ตะบอง) in Thai language as his weapon as well. Purpure base mean the Prince was born on Saturday. Other versions |

Military offices
| New title Service established | Commander of the Royal Aeronautical Service; 1913–1915 | Succeeded by Phraya Chalerm Akas |
