= Baston (weapon) =

Weapon in Arnis and Filipino martial arts

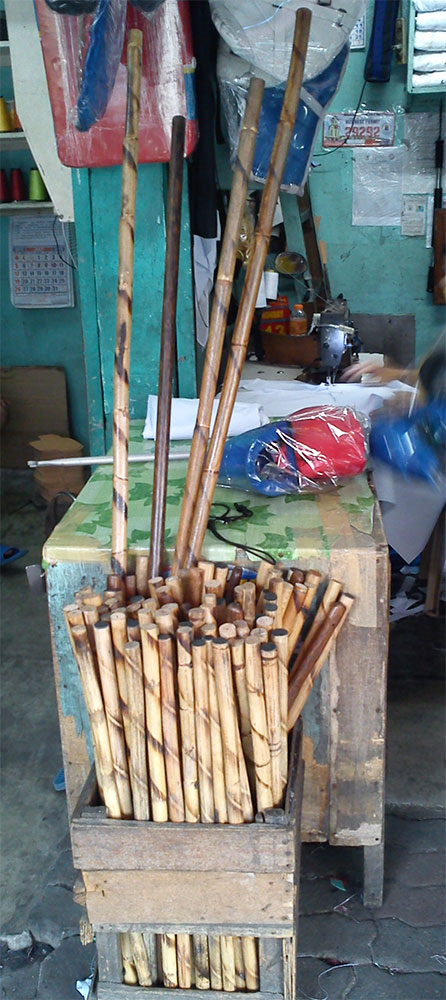
Rattan and bahi bastons and bangkaws being sold in Quiapo, Manila.

The baston or "kali sticks" (Spanish and Filipino for "cane") are one of the primary weapons of Arnis and Filipino martial arts. It is also known as yantok, olisi, palo, pamalo, garrote, caña, cane, arnis stick, eskrima stick or simply, stick.

== History ==
The usage of bastons for historical fencing (esgrima in Spanish) has been recorded at least as far back as 400 years ago. In Fr. Pedro de San Buenaventura's "Vocabulario de la Lengua Tagala" published in 1613 in Pila, Laguna, it states:

Esgrimir: Calis pp: dos con palos o canas, nagcacalis. (Fencing: Kalis pp. two with sticks or canes, nagkakalis)

Another instance where it is recorded is in "Vocabulario de la lengua Pampanga en Romance" by Fr. Diego Bergaño published in 1732:

CALIS. (pp.) N.S. Espada, ó daga. V. de Mi, de compañia esgrimir, ó pelear con ellas. Picalisin, el motivo, ut dama, y el lugar y tambien el de compañia: Micalis, ludir ut cañas, espadas, y todo lo demás. (Micalis, to rub canes, swords and everything else)

== Material ==
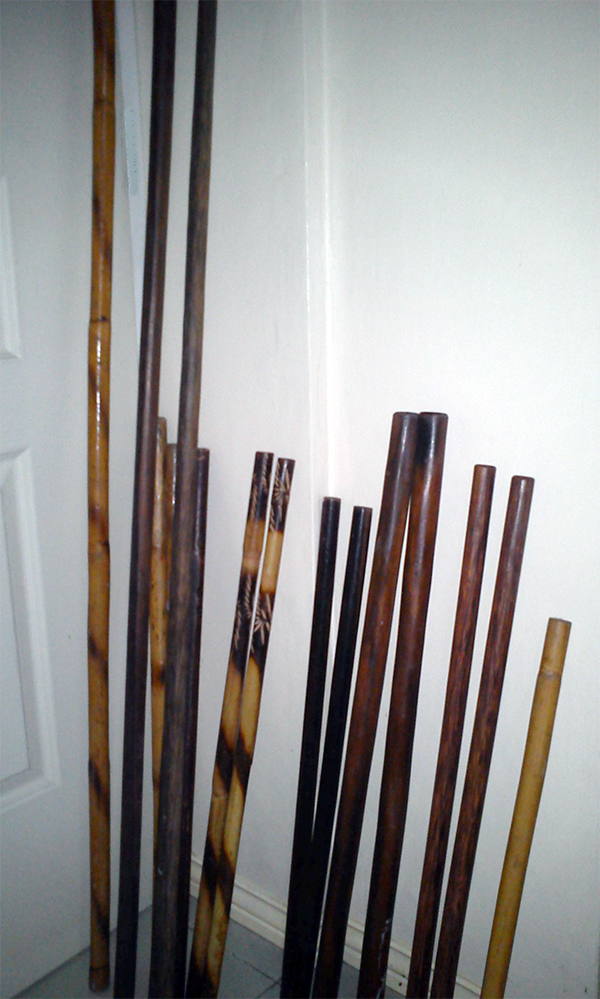
Various rattan, kamagong and bahi bangkaws and bastons of different sizes.

Traditional common materials for wooden bastons are usually rattan, kamagong, and bahi wood.

=== Rattan ===
Rattan is the most commonly used material for bastons in Arnis training. They are light, flexible and good for training in speed. They are made from dried and cut reeds and are typically cut 26–30 in (66–76 cm) in length, 0.75 to 1 in (1.9 to 2.5 cm) in diameter, and rounded at both ends. Prolonged impact training with rattan sticks will tend to splinter their ends so some practitioners use electrical or duct tape in order to protect their bastons, as they are more expensive outside of the Philippines.

=== Kamagong ===
Kamagong (also known as Mabolo) is a dark, dense, expensive type of wood known for its weight and hardness. It is said that bone will break before a good kamagong baston will, but those of low quality can splinter or shatter on impact due to their hardness and lack of flexibility. Kamagong is also an endangered species of ebony wood, and its export outside the Philippines is illegal without a permit.

=== Bahi ===
Bahi is a type of wood made from the heart of a palm tree. In weight and density, it is similar to kamagong, but is made of a porous material, which tends to slightly dent on impact, making it less prone to shattering than kamagong. Kamagong is a critically endangered lumber species so it is recommended that practitioners purchase bahi instead.

=== Modern materials ===
More modern materials are also used such as fiberglass and plastics, as well as metals like aluminum.

== Training ==
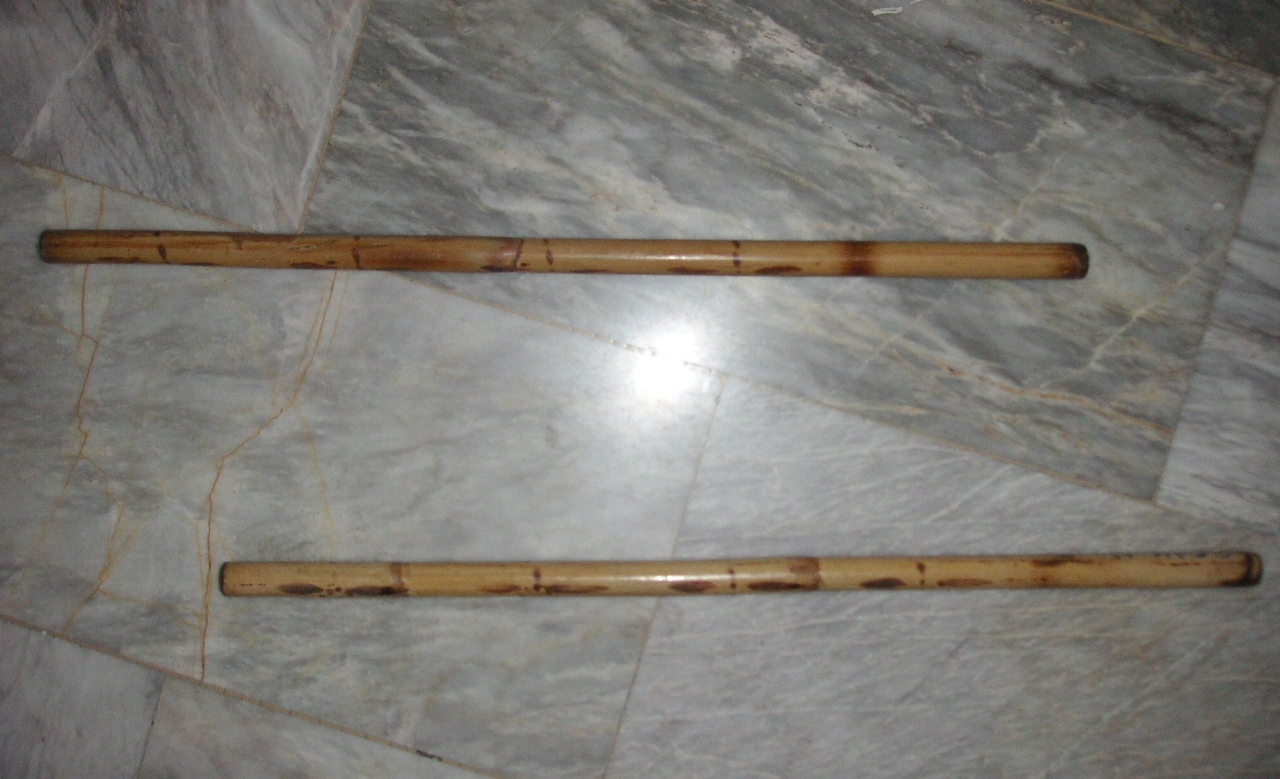
A pair of rattan bastons

In Arnis and Filipino martial arts, aside from being a primary weapon, bastons are also used as implements to train in bladed weapons such as bolos, machetes and other Philippine knives and swords as many motions using the canes are applicable when translated to blades and vice versa. Using wooden training weapons like the baston in lieu of live blades is also done for safety considerations.

For training in espada y daga styles, a baston and a balisong knife is a common combination. Hitting suspended or mounted vehicle tires is also a common practice in order to build speed, power and impact by practitioners.

== See also ==
- Jogo do pau
- Baton (law enforcement)
- Club (weapon)
- Shillelagh (club)
- Tanbō
- Tonfa
