= Tristan Stephenson =

British bartender, author and businessman

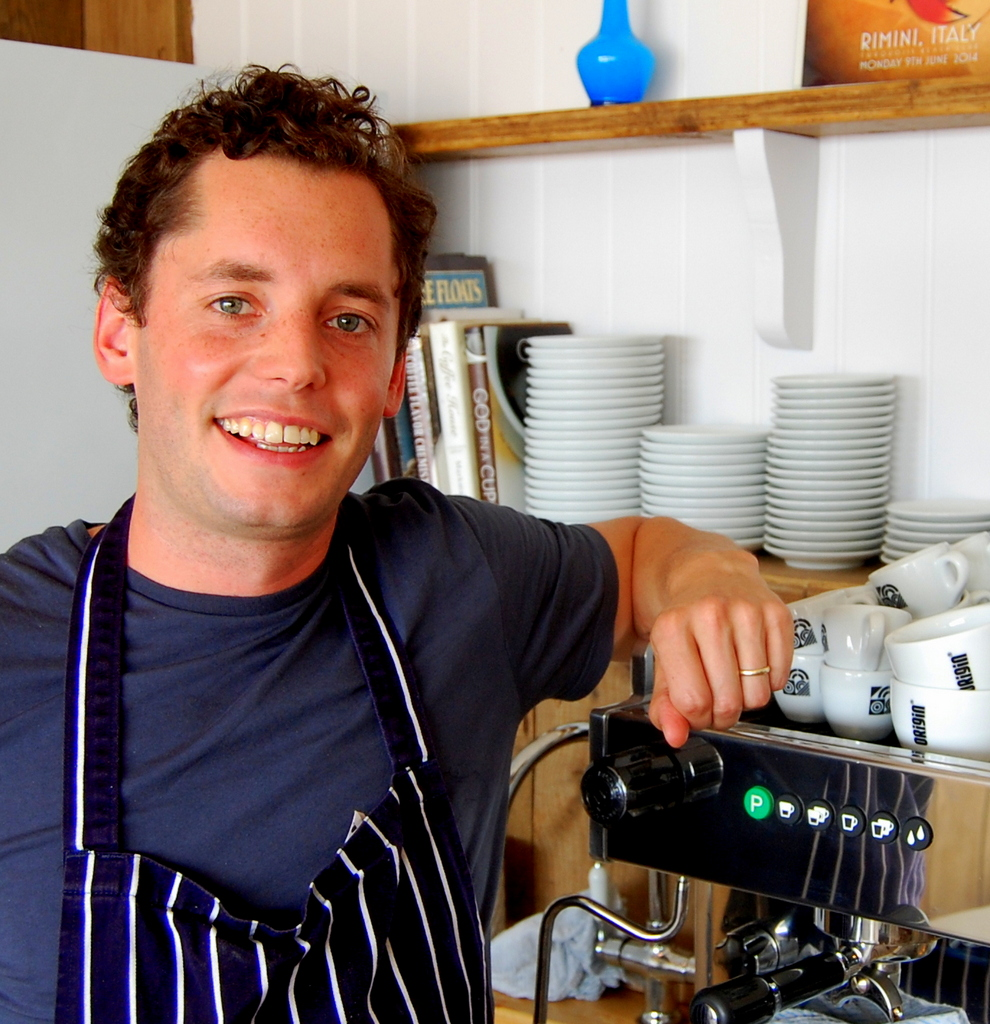
- Tristan Stephenson 2014
- Born: 14 November 1982 (age 44)
- Occupations: Bartender, writer, and businessman.

Tristan Stephenson (born 14 November 1982) is a British bartender, author, and businessperson.

== Life and career ==
Stephenson spent two years with Jamie Oliver's Fifteen restaurant in Cornwall, having set up their bar in 2005. Whilst there he was one of a team which harvested and roasted Arabica coffee beans, grown in the rainforest biome at the Eden Project to make what it believes to be the first cup of coffee made from beans grown in Britain. He became Brand ambassador for the Reserve Brands Group in 2007, and was on the training staff of The Connaught, The Dorchester and The Ritz London Hotel.

Stephenson came 3rd in 2009's UK Barista Championships having been trained by Origin Coffee of Constantine, Cornwall.

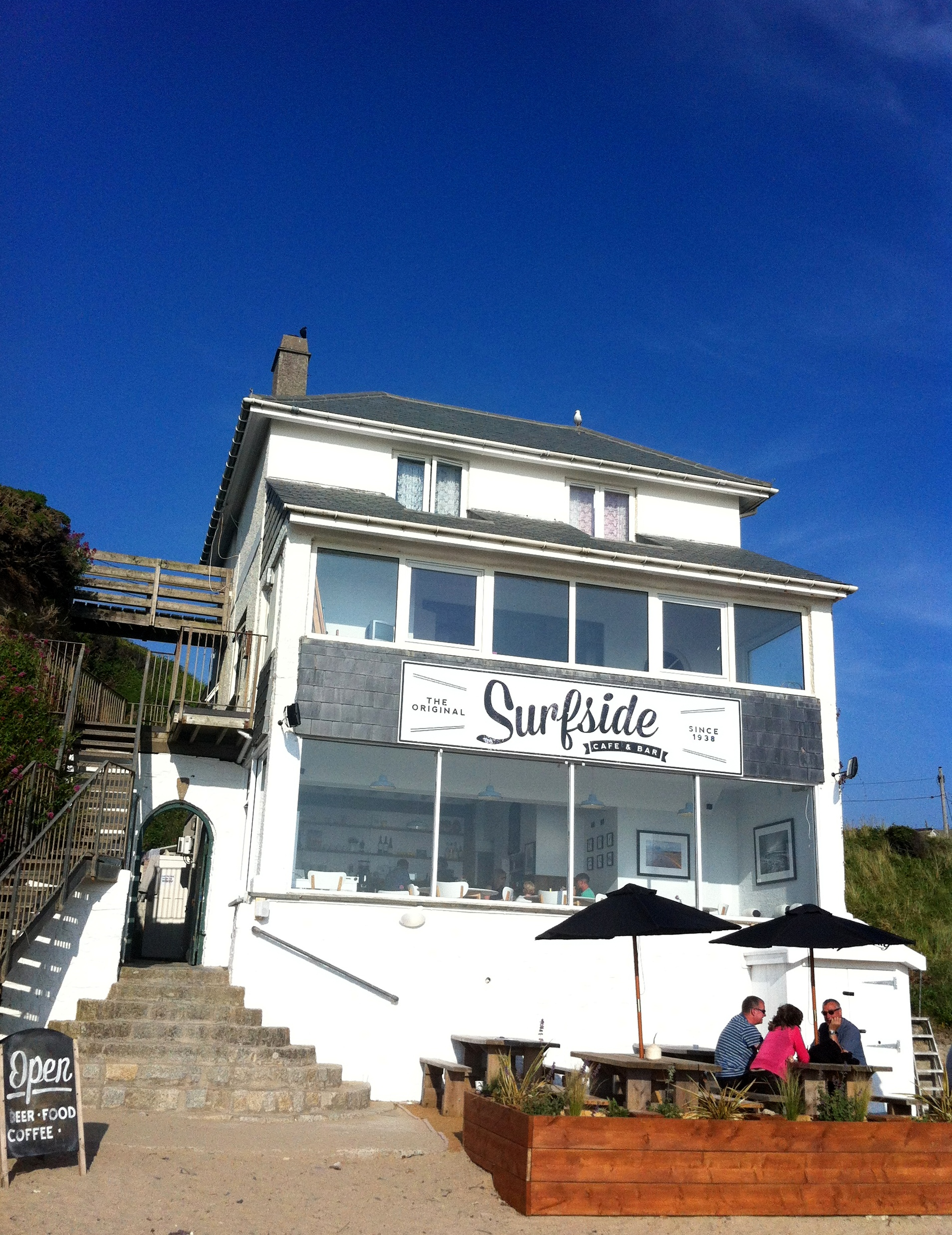
Surfside cafe Polzeath Cornwall

Stephenson co-founded Fluid Movement with Thomas Aske, a consultancy company for the drinks industry which pioneers molecular mixology. Stephenson opened his first cocktail bar Purl in Marylebone in 2010, the Worship Street Whistling Shop in Shoreditch in 2011, and in 2012, Dach & Sons in Hampstead Whistling Shop was awarded Time Out London's best new bar in 2011 and for three consecutive years was in the World's Fifty Best Bars.

He was awarded "CLASS Bartender of the Year" in 2011 and was referred to as one of "London's best bartenders" in a 2013 Telegraph article. Stephenson was also included in the Evening Standard's Top 1000 influential Londoners in 2012 in the category of "scenesters and drinkers". In 2018 he featured in Harpers Hot 50, recognising and celebrating the key influencers, innovators and drivers of quality drinks offers in the on-trade. He was also awarded Innovator of The Year in Imbibe Magazines Bar Personality Awards 2018.

In 2013 Stephenson partnered with Diageo to open a pop up gin palace in Covent Garden London to mark the birthday of Tanqueray's founder Charles Tanqueray and appeared in their 2013 adverts.

He has also released the Curious Bartender series of drinks books. His book The Curious Bartender: The Artistry & Alchemy of Creating the Perfect Cocktail was an Evening Standard Bestseller. The Curious Bartender: An Odyssey of Malt, Bourbon & Rye Whiskies was shortlisted for the 2015 Tales of the Cocktail Best New Spirits Book Award.

In March 2017 Supermarket retailer Lidl hired Stephenson as a consultant to advise on their spirits range.

In May 2021 Stephenson appeared on BBC1s Dragons Den and negotiated a joint investment of £75,000 from Deborah Meaden, Peter Jones and Tej Lalvani.

== Bars & restaurants ==
- Surfside Cafe Polzeath Cornwall
- The Worship Street Whistling Shop, London (closed)
- Black Rock, London
- The Napoleon Hotel, London (closed)
- Dach & Sons, Hampstead (closed)
- Sack, London (closed)
- The Devil's Darling, London (closed)
- Black Rock Tavern, London
- Black Rock, Bristol

== TV appearances ==
- Something for the Weekend
- Good Food Channel's Market Kitchen

== Books ==
- The Curious Bartender: The Artistry and Alchemy of Creating the Perfect Cocktail Ryland Peters & Small (2013) ISBN 978 1849754378
- The Curious Bartender: An Odyssey of Malt, Bourbon & Rye Whiskies Ryland Peters & Small (2014) ISBN 1849755620
- The Curious Barista's Guide to Coffee Ryland Peters & Small (2015) ISBN 9781849755634
- The Curious Bartender's Gin Palace Ryland Peters & Small (2016) ISBN 1849757011
- The Curious Bartender's Rum Revolution Ryland Peters & Small (2017) ISBN 1849758239
- The Curious Bartender Volume II: The New Testament of Cocktails Ryland Peters & Small (2018) ISBN 184975893X
- The Curious Bartender's Guide to Gin: How to appreciate gin from still to serve Ryland Peters & Small (2018) ISBN 1788790391
- The Curious Bartender's Whiskey Road Trip Ryland Peters & Small (2019) ISBN 1788791592
