= Phra Chuthathut Palace =

Former summer royal residence in Thailand

Coordinates: 13.15°N 100.82°E

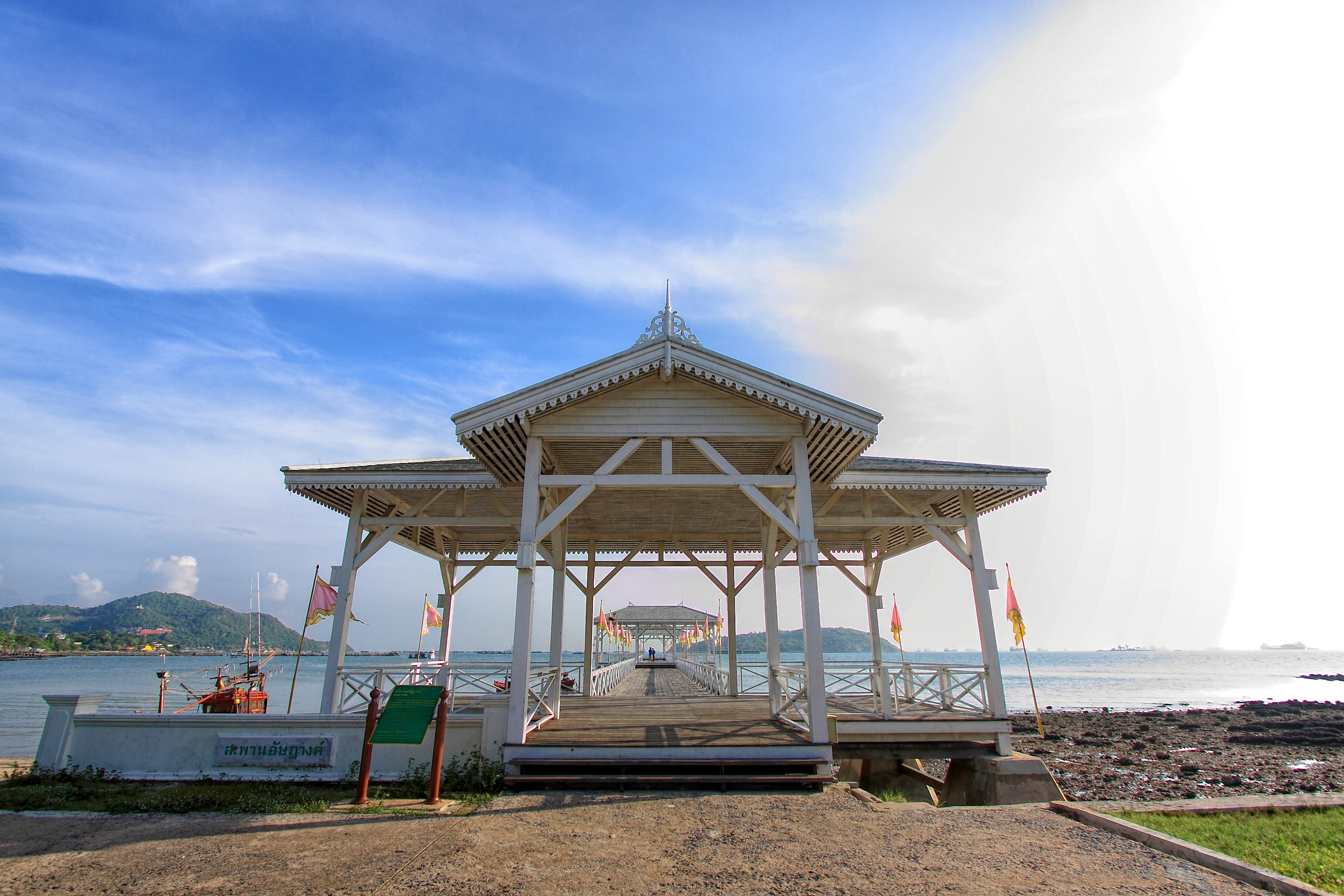
Saphan Asadang balcony of Phra Chuthathut Palace

The Phra Chuthathut Palace (Thai: พระจุฑาธุชราชฐาน Phra Chuthathut Ratchathan) or Sichang Palace (พระราชวังสีชัง Phra Ratcha Wang Sichang) is a former summer royal residence built during the reign of King Chulalongkorn the Great on the Sichang Island in Chonburi Province. After the French occupied the island during a conflict with Thailand over control of neighboring Laos in 1893, the royal residence was largely abandoned. Parts of the unfinished halls were removed and were used for the new Vimanmek Mansion in Bangkok. Since leaving the royal control, the palace has been used by various affiliations and authorities. Today, Chulalongkorn University occupies the palace for its "Sichang Marine Science Research and Training Station" and established the Chutathut Palace Museum of Chulalongkorn University, maintaining and preserving the palace.

== History ==
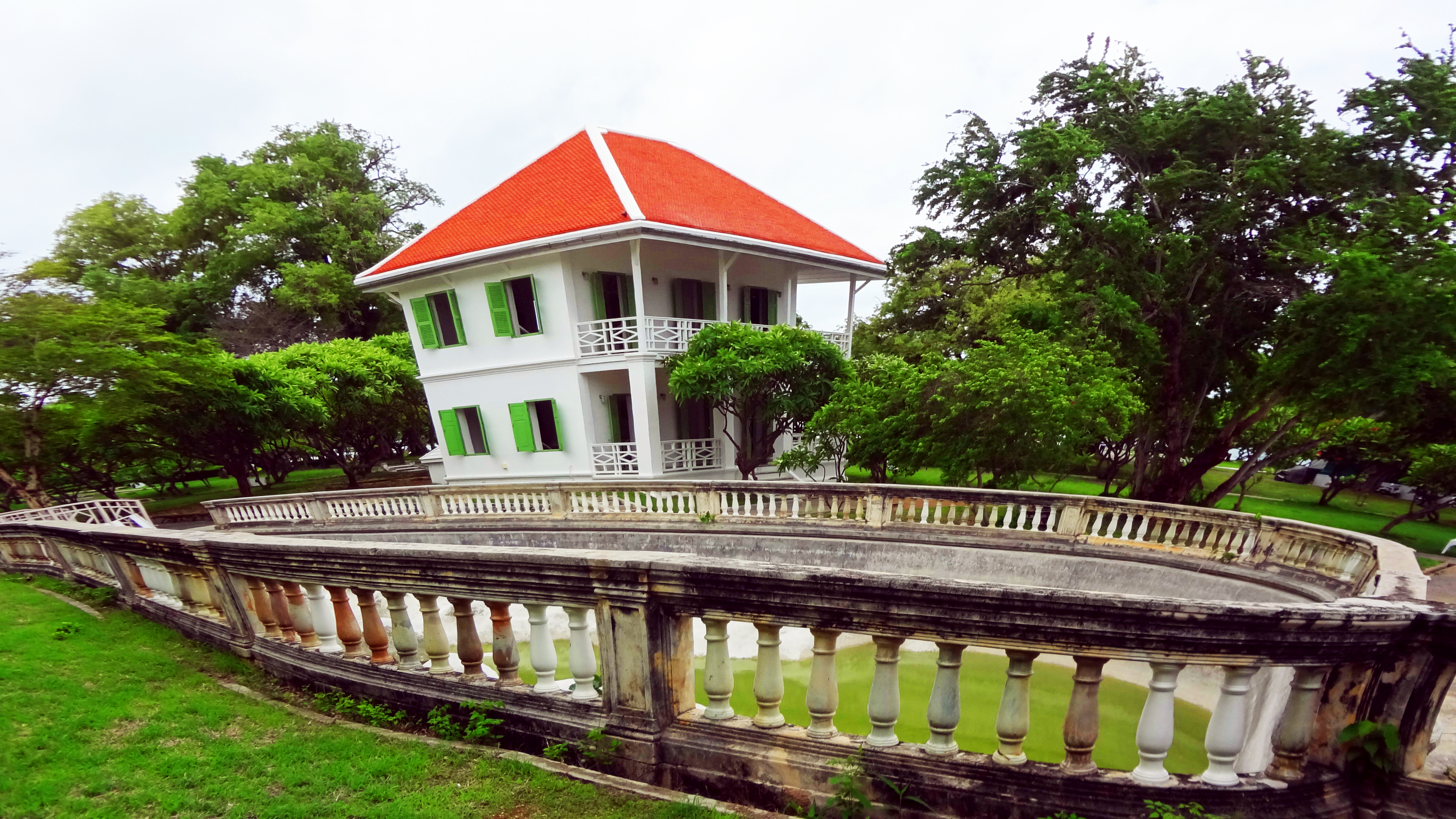
Vadhana Building

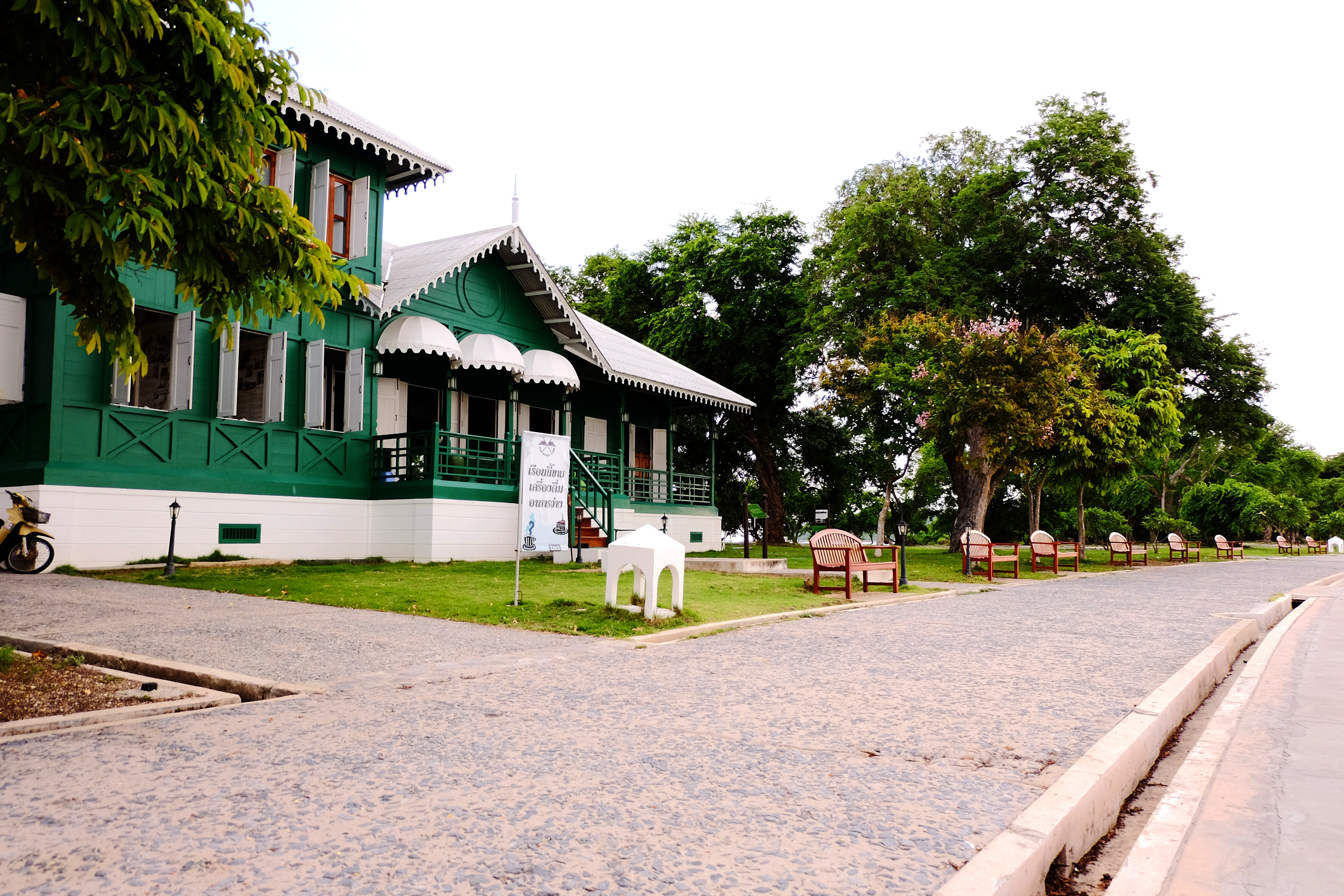
Sea View Building

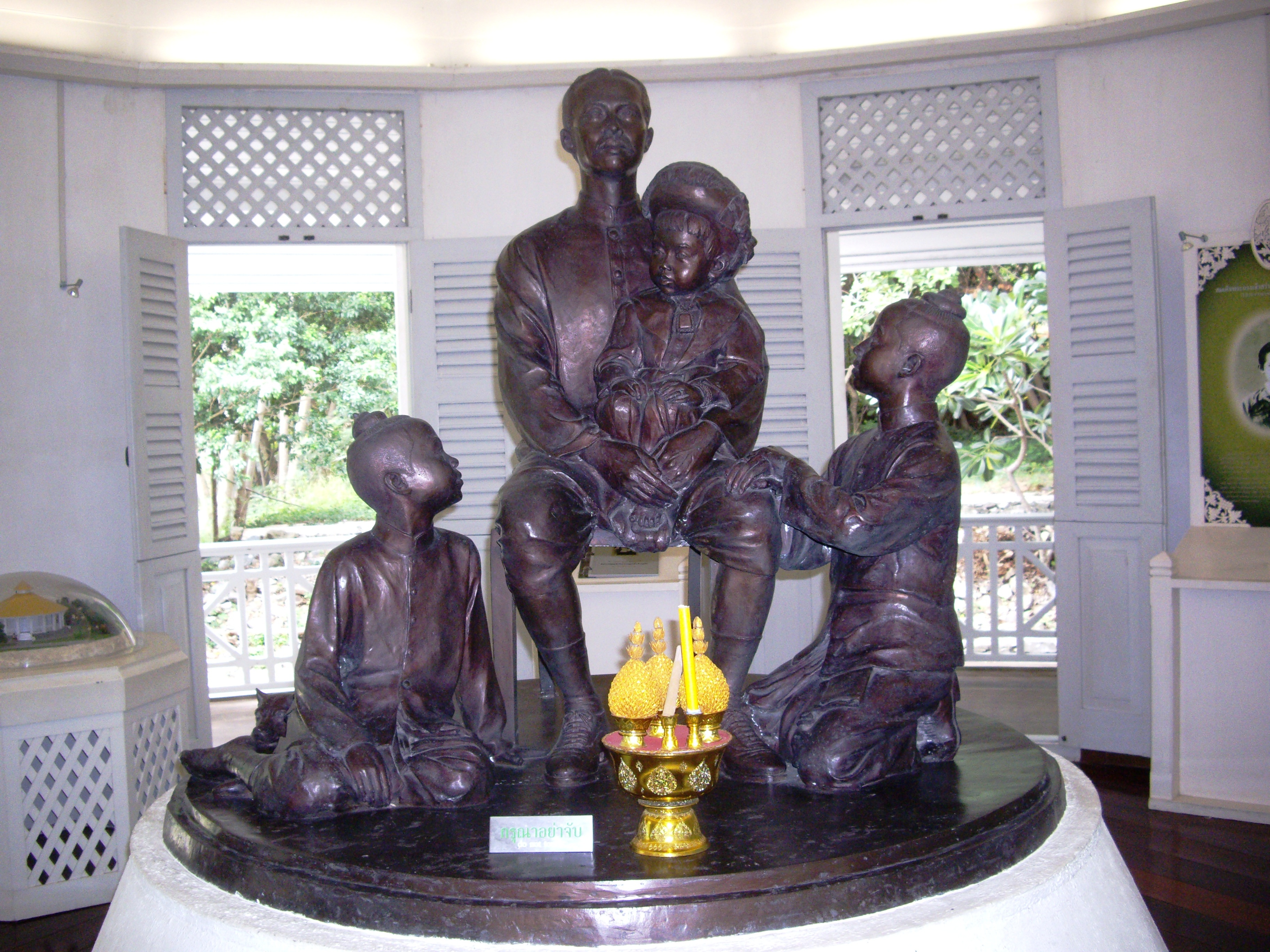
Statue of King Rama V with his children in Phongsri Building

In 1888 Queen Saovabha Phongsri and Crown Prince Vajiravudh were sick and were advised by their physician to stay at Ko Sichang until better. Ko Sichang was also where Prince Asdang Dejavudh recovered from an illness. In 1889, King Chulalongkorn built three patient wards, naming them the "Vadhana Building" after Queen Savang Vadhana, the "Phongsri Building" after Queen Saovabha Phongsri, and the "Apirom Building" after Princess Saisavali Bhiromya. In 1892, King Chulalongkorn was resting at Ko Sichang. At that time Queen Saovabha Phongsri was pregnant, so the king built a summer palace and named it "Phra Chuthathut Palace" after his son, Prince Chudadhuj Dharadilok who was born on the island. The palace was composed of four throne hall and 14 royal houses.

The royal residence was abandoned in 1893 after the French occupied the island during a conflict with Thailand over control of neighboring Laos in the Franco-Siamese crisis. In 1900 the parts of the palace were torn down and reassembled in Bangkok, part of the Vimanmek Mansion.

Phra Chuthathut Palace is the only royal palace in Thailand on an island.

== Museum ==
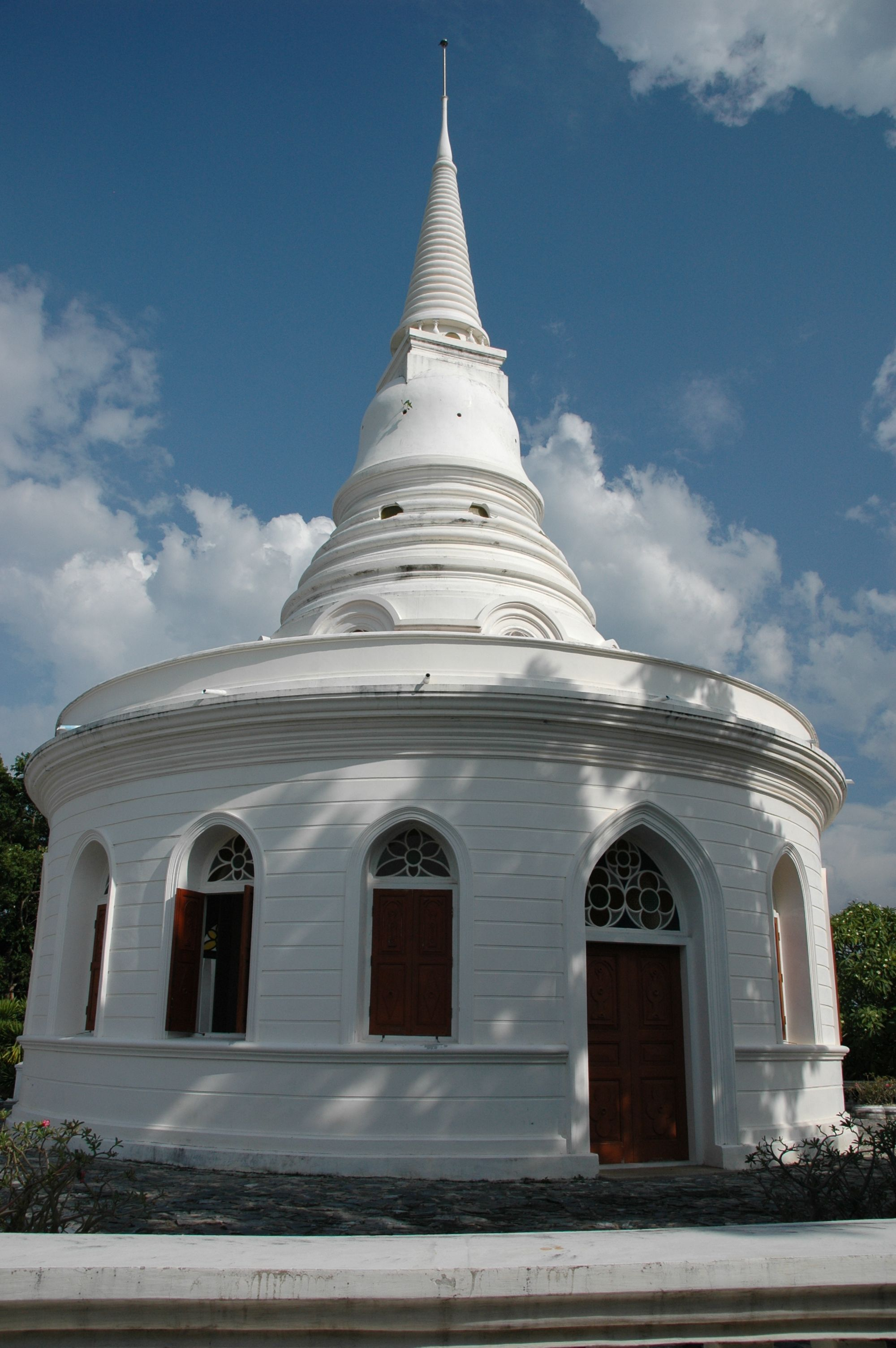
Pagoda of Wat Atsadang Nimit

In 2002, Chulalongkorn University renovated facilities for a museum. Princess Maha Chakri Sirindhorn presided over the opening ceremony of Phra Chuthathut Palace Museum on 12 January 2004.

The buildings renovated and now used as exhibition halls are the Pagoda of Wat Atsadang Nimit; the Sea View Building; Vadhana Building; Phongsri Building; and the Apirom Building.
