= Asdang Dejavudh =

Prince of Thailand province

- Prince of Nakhon Ratchasima
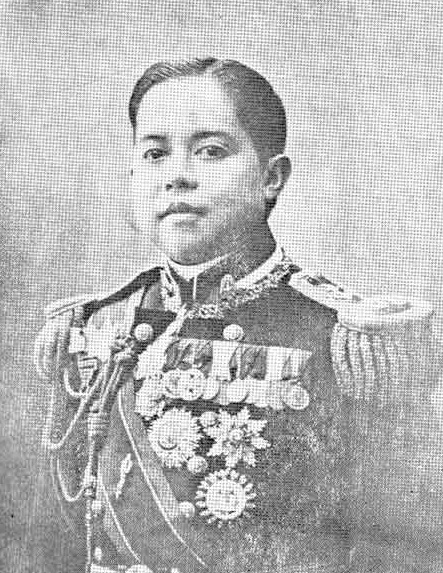

Director-General of the Royal Siamese Navy
- In office 1 July 1923 – 31 March 1924
- Preceded by: Abhakara Kiartivongse (as the Minister)
- Succeeded by: Vudhijaya Chalermlabh (as the Minister)
- Born: 12 May 1889; Bangkok, Siam
- Died: 9 February 1925 (aged 35); Bangkok, Siam
- Spouse: Paew Suddhiburana
- House: Chakri dynasty
- Father: Chulalongkorn (Rama V)
- Mother: Saovabha Phongsri

Asdang Dejavudh, Prince of Nakhon Ratchasima (Thai: อัษฎางค์เดชาวุธ; RTGS: Atsadang Dechawut, 12 May 1889 – 9 February 1925) was a son of King Chulalongkorn and Queen Saovabha Phongsri of Siam. He was given nickname as Eiad-lek or Prince Eiad-lek (Thai: เอียดเล็ก) and best known in the palace by his nickname of "Thunkramom Eiad-lek".

== Early life and education ==
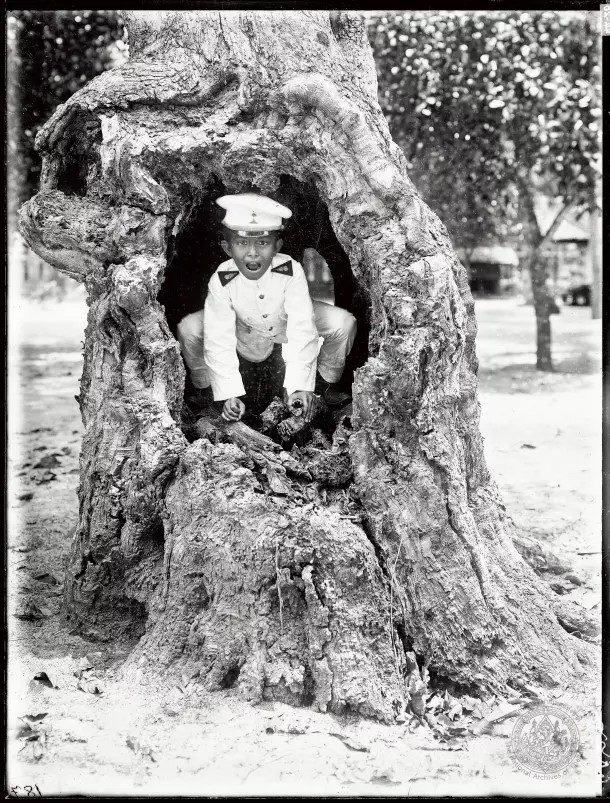
As a child in the 1890s

Prince Asdang Dejavudh was born on 12 May 1889 to King Chulalongkorn and Queen Saovabha Phongsri. When the prince was three-years old in 1891, he began suffering from a disease which doctors said could not be cured if the prince stayed in Bangkok. For that reason, Chulalongkorn brought Asdang Dejavudh to the island of Ko Sichang off the coast of modern-day Chonburi province. Chulalongkorn had previously brought another son, Prince Vajiravudh, when he was seven to recover from another illness. Asdang Dejavudh spent several months on Ko Sichang before he got well again. To celebrate his son's recovery, Chulalongkorn built the Asdang Bridge near the Phra Chuthathut Palace on the island. The bridge's royal opening ceremony was held on 23 August 1891 after construction began on 10 August.

On 5 July 1903 at age 14, Asdang Dejavudh entered monkhood. In 1905, he was sent to England for his education along with his brother Chudadhuj Dharadilok, and half brother Mahidol Adulyadej. Asdang Dejavudh however did not stay long in England and went to Singapore for education. He returned to Siam in 1908 and entered the Siamese Military Academy.

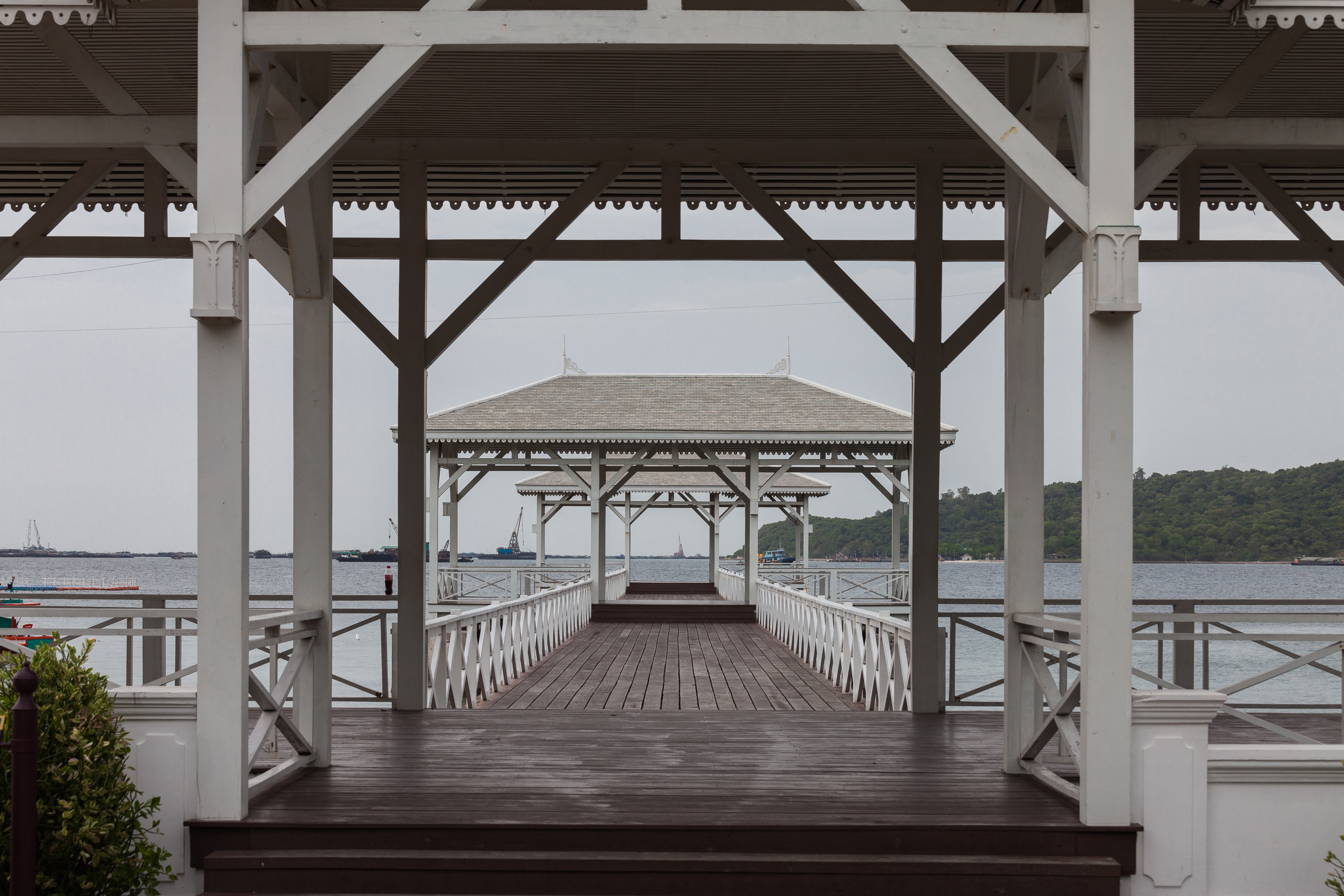
Asdang Bridge in 2018 on Ko Sichang

== As heir ==
After the death of his older brother, Prince Chakrabongse Bhuvanath in 1920, he became the heir presumptive to his brother King Vajiravudh. Asdang Dejavudh however never became King of Thailand as he died on 9 February 1925 from kidney disease, 9 months and 17 days before King Vajiravudh died, being succeeded instead by their younger brother Prajadhipok.

== Monogram and Coat of arms ==
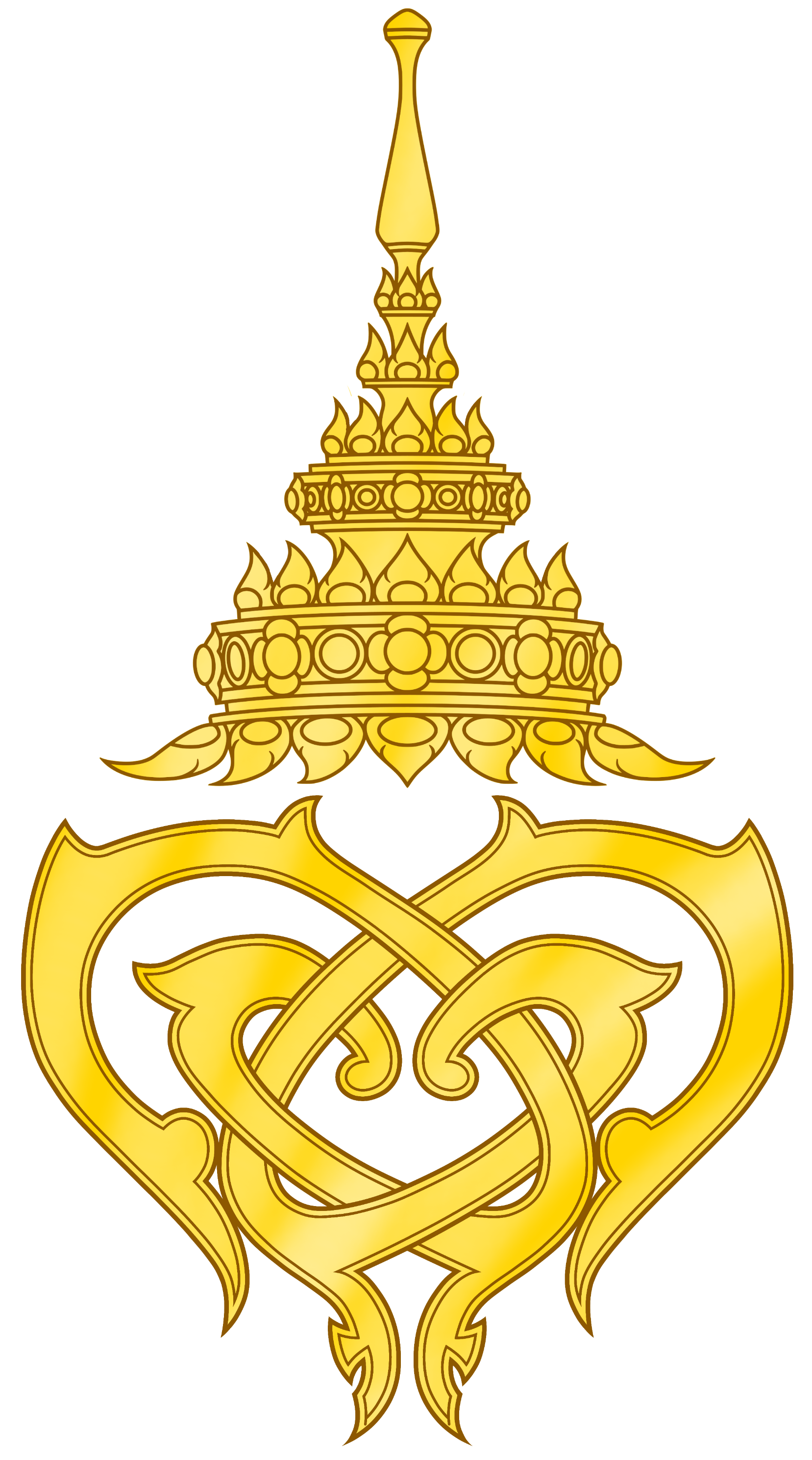
Monogram of Prince Asdang Dejavudh

Coat of arms of Prince Asdang Dejavudh

Escutcheon (variant design)

The personal emblem

== Royal Decorations ==
- The Most Illustrious Order of the Royal House of Chakri
- The Ancient and Auspicious Order of the Nine Gems
- Knight Grand Cross (First Class) of The Most Illustrious Order of Chula Chom Klao
- Ratana Varabhorn Order of Merit
- Knight Grand Cordon (Special Class) of The Most Noble Order of the Crown of Thailand
- King Rama IV Royal Cypher Medal (Second Class)
- King Rama V Royal Cypher Medal (First Class)
- King Rama VI Royal Cypher Medal (First Class)
