= Siriraj Kakudhabhand =

Prince of Siam, son of Chulalongkorn

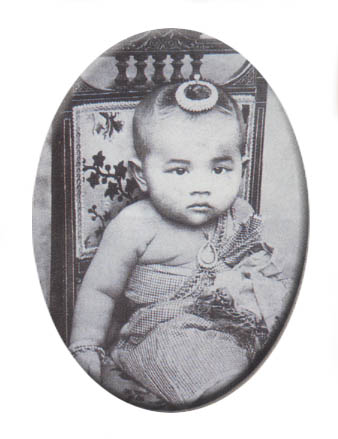
- Born: 27 November 1885; Bangkok, Siam
- Died: 31 May 1887 (aged 1); Bangkok, Siam
- House: Chakri dynasty
- Father: Chulalongkorn (Rama V)
- Mother: Saovabha Phongsri

Prince Siriraj Kakudhabhand (Thai: ศิริราชกกุธภัณฑ์; RTGS: Sirirat Kakutthaphan; 27 November 1885 – 31 May 1887) was the Prince of Siam (later Thailand). He was a member of the Siamese royal family and was the son of King Chulalongkorn and Queen Saovabha Phongsri.

Siriraj Hospital is named after him. He was the 53rd child of King Chulalongkorn and the fifth child of Queen Saovabha Phongsri.
