= Tribejrutama Dhamrong =

Prince of Siam, son of Chulalongkorn

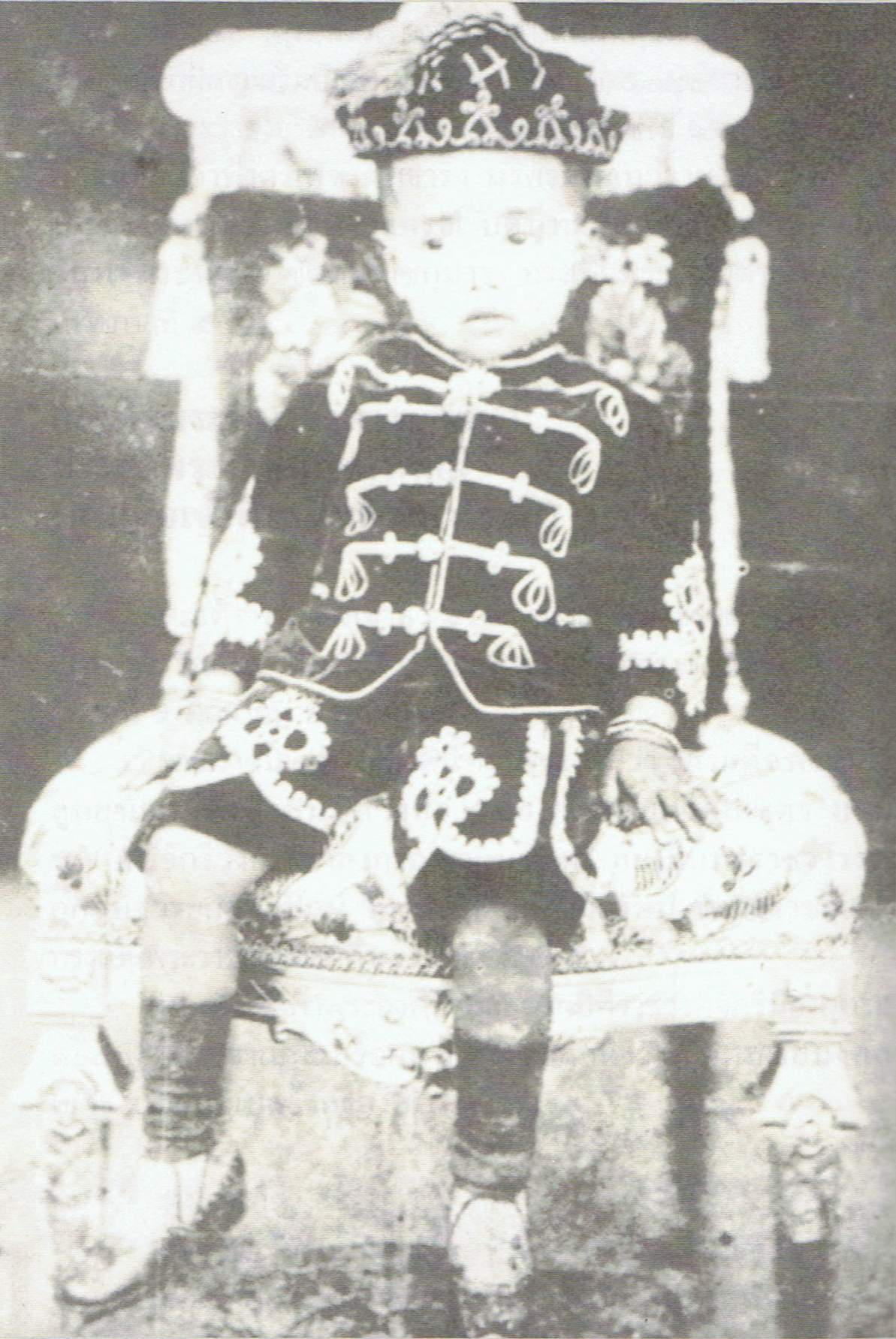
- Born: 8 February 1882; Bangkok, Siam
- Died: 22 November 1887 (aged 5); Bangkok, Siam
- House: Chakri Dynasty
- Father: Chulalongkorn (Rama V)
- Mother: Saovabha Phongsri

Tribejrutama Dhamrong (Thai: ตรีเพ็ชรุตม์ธำรง; RTGS: Triphetcharutthamrong; 8 February 1882 – 22 November 1887) was a Prince of Siam (later Thailand). He was a member of the Siamese Royal Family. He was a son of Chulalongkorn.

== Biography ==
Prince Tribejrutama Dhamrong was born on 8 February 1881, at Grand Palace, Bangkok. He was the 36th son of King Chulalongkorn, and the third son of the King and Queen Saovabha Phongsri (bestowed as Queen Sri Bajrindra, the Queen Mother in a later reign). After birth, his father gave him the full name as Tribejrutama Dhamrong Narisaravongs Devarajvarobhatojatbisudhi Ratanaburusaya Chulalongkorn Badindorndebayavaroros Adulyayosvisudhikrasatri Kattiyarajakumarn (Thai: ตรีเพ็ชรุตม์ธำรง นริศรวงศ์ เทวราชวโรภโตชาตวิสุทธิ์ รัตนบุรุษย์จุฬาลงกรณ์ บดินทรเทพยาวโรรส อดุลยยศวิสุทธิ์กระษัตริย์ ขัตติยราชกุมาร)

He died on 22 November 1887, at age 5. He died 3 months after the death of his elder sister, Princess Bahurada Manimaya, and 6 months after his younger brother, Prince Siriraja Kakudhabhandh, who died on 31 May 1887.
