= Bahurada Manimaya =

Princess of Siam, daughter of Chulalongkorn

- Princess Debnariratana
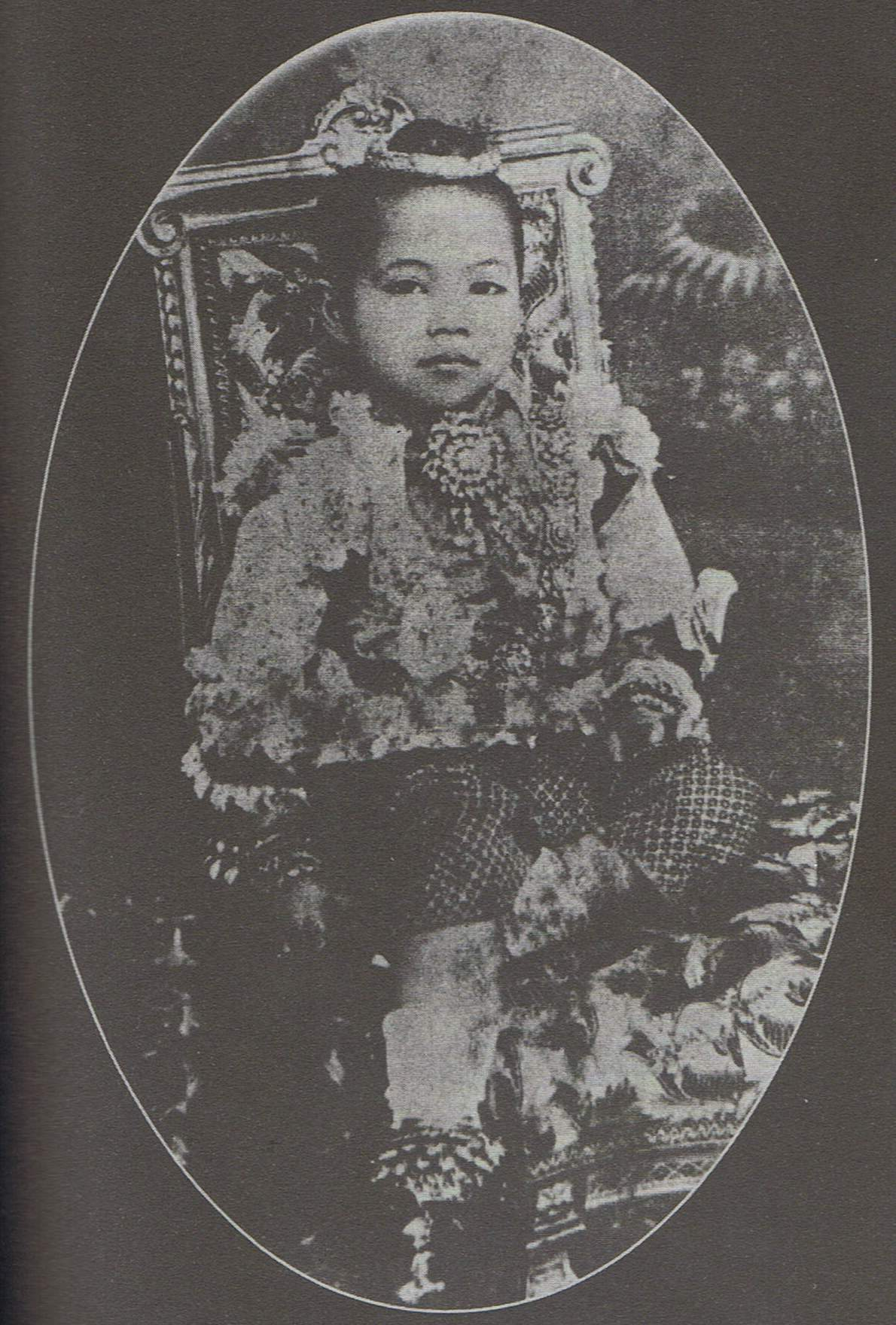
- Born: 19 December 1878; Grand Palace, Bangkok, Siam
- Died: 27 August 1887 (aged 8); Grand Palace, Bangkok, Siam
Names
- Bahurada Manimaya Prabaibannabichitra Narisarajakumari
- House: Chakri Dynasty
- Father: Chulalongkorn (Rama V)
- Mother: Saovabha Phongsri

Bahurada Manimaya, Princess Debnariratana (Thai: พาหุรัตมณีมัย; RTGS: Phahuratmanimai; 19 December 1878 – 27 August 1887), was a Princess of Siam (later Thailand). She was a member of the Siamese royal family. She was a daughter of Chulalongkorn, King Rama V of Siam.

== Biography ==
Princess Bahurada Manimaya was the first daughter of King Chulalongkorn (Rama V the Great) of Siam and Queen Saovabha Phongsri together, (later Queen Sri Bajrindra, the Queen Mother). She was born on 19 December 1878 at the Grand Palace. After she was born, her father, King Chulalongkorn named her Bahurada Manimaya Prabaibannabichitra Narisarajakumari (Thai: พาหุรัตมณีมัย ประไพพรรณพิจิตร นริศราชกุมารี; RTGS: Phahuratmanimai Praphaiphanphichit Naritratchakumari). She was also called Thunkramom Ying Yai, which means the eldest daughter of the king, even though the king had older daughters by other mothers.

In poor health all of her life, she died on 27 August 1887 at the age of only 8. This greatly saddened her parents and all members of the royal family. A royal cremation was held for her and two younger brothers, Prince Siriraja Kakudhabhandh, the 4th son of King Chulalongkorn and Queen Saovabha Phongsri, who died on 31 May 1887, and Prince Tribejrutama Dhamrong, who died 3 months later.

After she died, Queen Saovabha Phongsri, her mother, gave her first daughter's properties to the government to create a road and named it after her, Bahurada road, also spelled as Phahurat or Pahurat road, in remembrance of her.

On 9 November 1915, in King Vajiravudh (Rama VI)'s reign, her younger brother gave her the posthumous title, and the Krom rank Princess Debnariratana or Kromma Phra Debnariratana (Thai: กรมพระเทพนารีรัตน์), the second level of the Krom ranks.
