= Saovabha Phongsri =

Queen of Siam from 1897 to 1910

Saovabha Phongsri; สมเด็จพระนางเจ้าเสาวภาผ่องศรี
- Queen Mother of Siam; Queen Sri Bajarindra
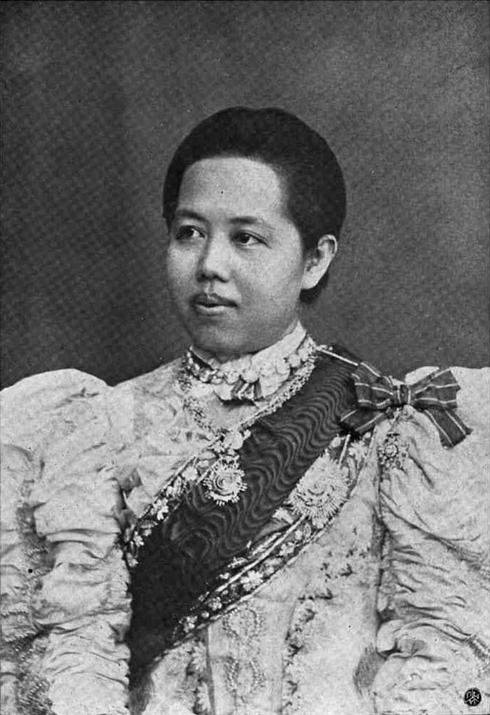

Queen consort of Siam
- Tenure: 4 April 1897 – 23 October 1910

Queen regent of Siam
- Regency: 7 April 1897 – 16 December 1897
- Monarch: Chulalongkorn (Rama V)
- Born: 1 January 1864; Bangkok, Siam
- Died: 20 October 1919 (aged 55); Bangkok, Siam
- Spouse: Chulalongkorn (Rama V)
- Issue Detail: Bahurada Manimaya; Vajiravudh (Rama VI); Tribejrutama Dhamrong; Chakrabongse Bhuvanath; Siriraj Kakudhabhand; Asdang Dejavudh; Chudadhut Dharadilok; Prajadhipok (Rama VII)
Names
- Somdet Phra Nang Chao Saovabha Phongsri Phra Boromma Rajininat
- Dynasty: Chakri
- Father: Mongkut (Rama IV)
- Mother: Piam Sucharitakul
- Religion: Theravada Buddhism
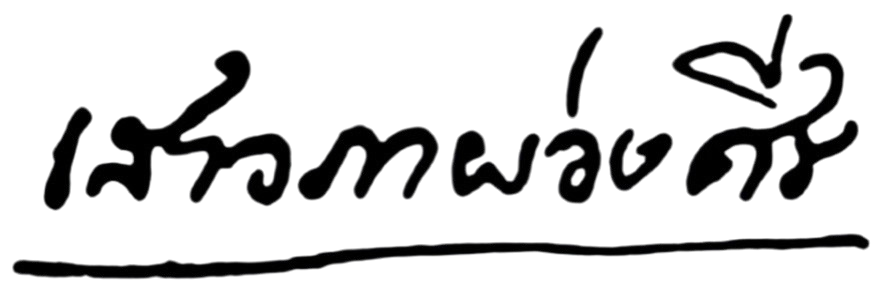
- Signature

Royal wives of Chulalongkorn

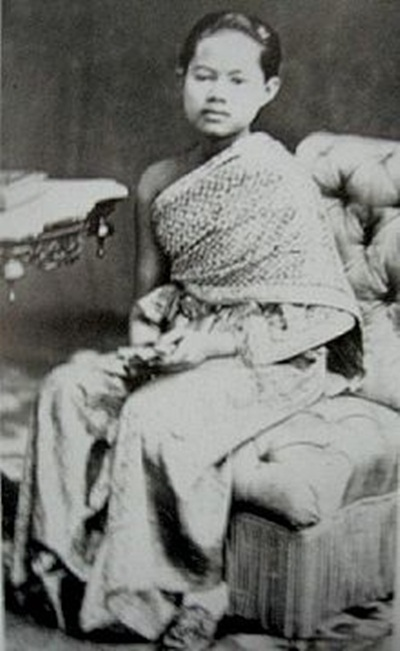
Sunanda Kumariratana

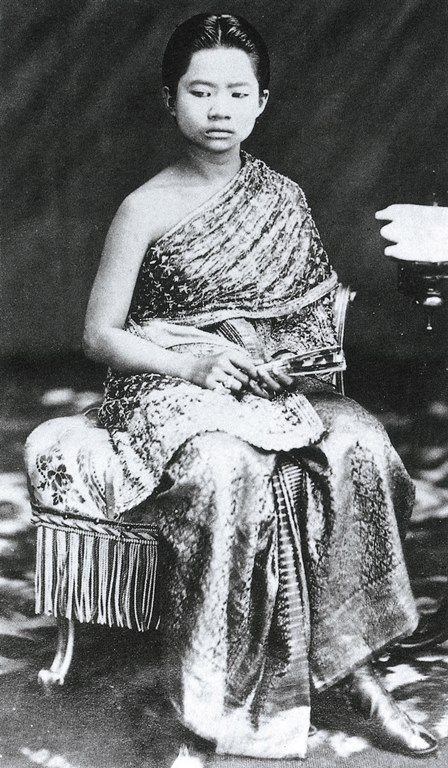
Sukhumala Marasri

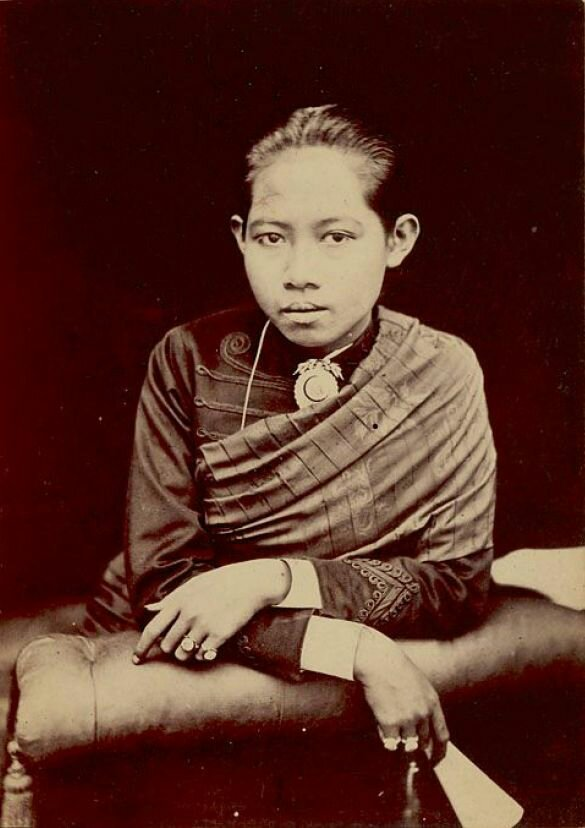
Savang Vadhana

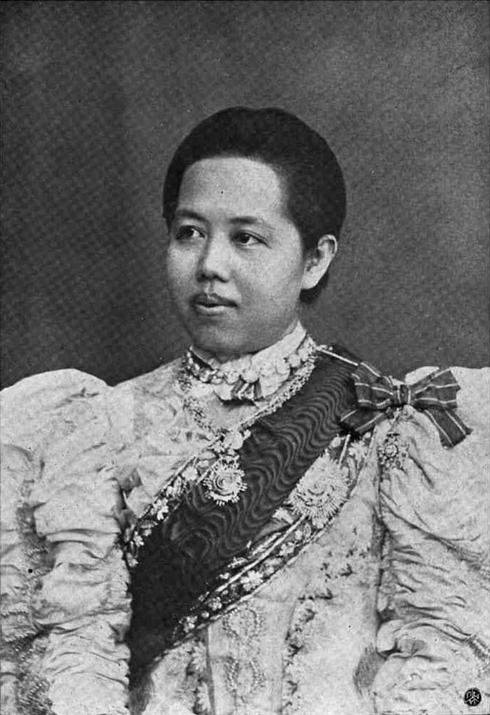
Saovabha Phongsri

Saovabha Phongsri (Thai: เสาวภาผ่องศรี, RTGS: Saowapha Phongsi; 1 January 1864 – 20 October 1919) was an agnatic half-sister, royal wife and queen consort of King Chulalongkorn (Rama V) of Thailand, and mother of both King Vajiravudh (Rama VI) and King Prajadhipok (Rama VII). As in accordance with Thai royal tradition, King Vajiravudh later bestowed on his mother the title of "Queen Mother Sri Bajarindra" (Thai: ศรีพัชรินทร; RTGS: Si Phatcharin).

== Life ==
Saovabha was born as a Princess of Siam to King Mongkut (or Rama IV) and Princess Consort Piyamavadi (Lady Piam Sucharitakul). She was the youngest sister of the future Queen Sunanda Kumariratana and Queen Savang Vadhana. Saovabha became the consort of her half-brother King Chulalongkorn sometime in 1878. She gave him 9 children, 5 would survive to adulthood (one died in infancy), two would eventually become King of Siam.

In 1897, Queen Saovabha became the first female Regent of Siam, when her husband went on a tour of Europe. When he returned he bestowed upon her the title of "Somdet Phra Nang Chao Saowapha Phongsi Praborommarachininat" (RTGS) (Thai: สมเด็จพระนางเจ้าเสาวภาผ่องศรี พระบรมราชินีนาถ) (roughly equivalent to H.M. the Queen Regent). During her time as queen, she took many interests, especially in the issues concerning women. In 1904 she established one of the first schools for girls in Siam; the "Rajini School" or Queen's School in Bangkok.

She was a Buddhist adherent who had faith in Theravada Buddhism and prayed with the Hindu ritual ceremonies of the Suthasri Abiromya throne hall.

When she died in 1919 at the age of 58, she was given a grand Royal Funeral, attended by all members of the Siamese Royal Family, and the ceremony was presided over by her son King Vajiravudh. She played a prominent posthumous role in the 1924 Palace Law of Succession, in which her son King Vajiravudh stipulated that her children would take precedent among all others over the line of succession. This guaranteed the accession of her youngest son Prince Prajadhipok to the throne in 1925, despite there being more senior and learned sons of Chulalongkorn. The Queen Saovabha Memorial Institute was named after her.

== Children ==
She had 9 children with King Chulalongkorn:

Name	Birth	Death	Spouse	Children
Bahurada Manimaya, Princess Debanariratana	19 December 1878	27 August 1887		
Vajiravudh	1 January 1881	25 November 1925	Prabai Sucharitakul	None
Vajiravudh	1 January 1881	25 November 1925	Princess Wanphimon Varavan	None
Vajiravudh	1 January 1881	25 November 1925	Prueng Sucharitakul	None
Vajiravudh	1 January 1881	25 November 1925	Krueakaew Abhayavongsa	Princess Bejaratana Rajasuda
Prince Tribejrutama Dhamrong	8 February 1882	22 November 1887		
Chakrabongse Bhuvanath, Prince of Bisnulok	3 March 1883	13 June 1920	Ekaterina Ivanovna Desnitskaya	Prince Chula Chakrabongse
Chakrabongse Bhuvanath, Prince of Bisnulok	3 March 1883	13 June 1920	Princess Javalit Obhas Rabibadhana	None
Prince Siriraj Kakudhabhanda	27 November 1885	3 May 1887		
Princess (Unnamed)	13 December 1887	13 December 1887		
Asdang Dejavudh, Prince of Nakhon Rajasima	12 May 1889	9 February 1924	Paew Suddhiburana	None
Chudadhuj Dharadilok, Prince of Bejraburana	5 July 1892	8 July 1923	La-or Sirisambandh	Princess Sudasiri Sobha
Chudadhuj Dharadilok, Prince of Bejraburana	5 July 1892	8 July 1923	Ravi Kayananda	Prince Varananda Dhavaj
Chudadhuj Dharadilok, Prince of Bejraburana	5 July 1892	8 July 1923	Princess Bunchiradhorn Jumbala	None
Prajadhipok	8 November 1893	30 May 1941	Princess Rambai Barni Svastivatana	None

In addition, the queen also adopted one of Savang Vadhana's daughters, Princess Valaya Alongkorn and raised as her own daughter.

== See also ==
- 1924 Palace Law of Succession
- Savang Vadhana
- Chulalongkorn
- Vajiravudh
- Prajadhipok

Sri Bajarindra House of Chakri Born: 1 January 1864 Died: 20 October 1919
Thai royalty
Vacant Title last held by Ramphoei Siriwong	Queen consort of Siam; 1878–1910	Vacant Title next held by Praphai Sucharitakul
Non-profit organization positions
First	President of Siamese Red Cross Society; 1893–1919	Vacant Title next held by Savang Vadhana
