= Chudadhuj Dharadilok =

Chudadhuj Dharadilok จุฑาธุชธราดิลก
- Prince of Phetchabun
- Born: 4 July 1892; Sichang Island, Siam
- Died: 8 July 1923 (aged 31); Bangkok, Siam
- Spouse: Bunchiradhorn Jumbala; Ravi Kayananda; La-or Sirisambandh
- Issue: Princess Sudasiri Sobha; Prince Varananda Dhavaj
- House: Chudadhut family (Chakri dynasty)
- Father: Chulalongkorn (Rama V)
- Mother: Saovabha Phongsri

Prince Chudadhuj Dharadilok, Prince of Phetchabun (Thai: จุฑาธุชธราดิลก, RTGS: Chuthathut Tharadilok; 4 July 1892– 8 July 1923), was a son of Chulalongkorn and Saovabha He was one of the most senior Thai princes during the rule of his full brother, King Vajiravudh.

== Biography ==
Prince Chudadhuj was born on July 5, 1892 at Morakut Sutta Palace, Ko Sichang, Chonburi province in which the King gave the name of the royal court Phra Chuthathut Palace according to the name "Prince Chudadhuj" who was born at that place. When he was young, he was named "Thun Kramom Tew". King Chulalongkorn sent Prince Chudadhuj to study in England along with Prince Asdang Dejavudh and Prince Mahidol Adulyadej. In 1905 he studied at Magdalene College, University of Cambridge and then he returned to government service as a professor at Chulalongkorn University. He taught English at Faculty of Political Science on October 4, 1918, and was the commander of Poh-Chang Academy of Arts in 1918.

Prince Chudadhuj's passion for art and played the grand piano, harp, and violin, theater arts and has written an ancient drama.

Prince Chudadhuj died at Sa Pathum Palace on July 8, 1923 at 31 years old.

== Marriage and family ==
Prince Chudadhuj married Princess Bunchiradhorn Jumbala on 25 August 1922 (Thai: บุญจิราธร ชุมพล; RTGS: Bunchirathon Chumphon) - however, he did not produce a child with her.

He had two illegitimate children with commoners, who nevertheless received the royal rank of Phra Worawong Ther Phra Ong Chao (Thai: พระวรวงศ์เธอ พระองค์เจ้า) :

- Princess Sudasiri Sobha (Thai: สุทธสิริโสภา; RTGS: Sutthasirisopha, 1918–1998) produced by Mom La-or Sirisambandh (Thai: ลออ ศิริสัมพันธ์; RTGS: La-o Sirisamphan), who married Prince Suvinit Kitiyakara had issue.
- Prince Varananda Dhavaj (Thai: วรานนท์ธวัช; RTGS: Waranonthawat, 1920–1990) produced by Mom Ravi Kayananda (Thai: ระวี ไกยานนท์), who married Pamela Smee, Princess Galyani Vadhana Mahidol, Princess Kawkaewprakaikavila Na Chiangmai and Srisalai Suchatwut. He had issue with Smee.

Name	Birth	Death	Marriage		Their children
Name	Birth	Death	Date	Spouse	Their children
By La-or Sirisambandh
Princess Sudasiri Sobha	16 December 1918	2 February 1998 (aged 79)	Unknown	Prince Suvinit Kitiyakara	Mom Rajawongse Sunida Kitayakara
Princess Sudasiri Sobha	16 December 1918	2 February 1998 (aged 79)	Unknown	Prince Suvinit Kitiyakara	Mom Rajawongse Saowanit Kitayakara
By Ravi Kayananda
Prince Varananda Dhavaj	19 August 1922	15 September 1990 (aged 68)	10 June 1950	Pamela Smee	Mom Rajawongse Dilok Nicholas Chudadhuj
Prince Varananda Dhavaj	19 August 1922	15 September 1990 (aged 68)	10 June 1950	Pamela Smee	Mom Rajawongse Dara Jane Chudadhuj
Prince Varananda Dhavaj	19 August 1922	15 September 1990 (aged 68)	24 September 1969	Galyani Vadhana, Princess of Naradhiwas	None

== See also ==
- 1924 Palace Law of Succession
