= Paew Snidvongseni =

Thai dancer (1903–2000)

Thanphuying Paew Snidvongseni
- แผ้ว สนิทวงศ์เสนี
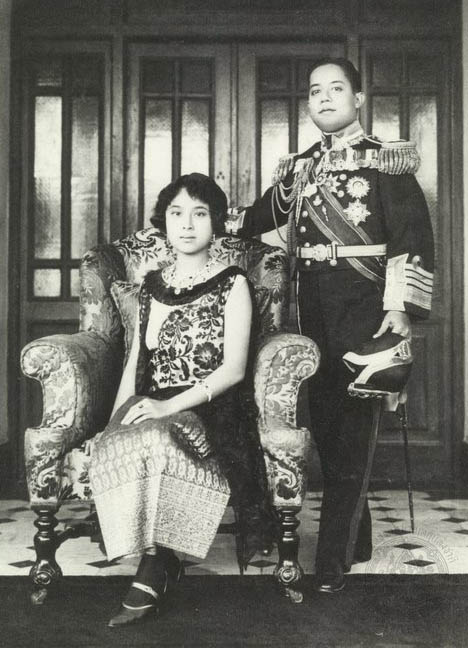
- Paew and Asdang Dejavudh
- Born: Paew Suddhiburana; 25 December 1903; Chachoengsao, Siam
- Died: 24 September 2000 (aged 96); Bangkok, Thailand
- Other name: Paew Nakhonratchasima
- Occupations: Actress; dancer
- Spouses: Asdang Dejavudh, Prince of Nakhon Ratchasima; Mom Snidvongseni (Tan Snidvongs)
- Children: Taeo Snidvongs; Nuanphong Senanarong; Toem Snidvongs; Tuang Snidvongs

Signature
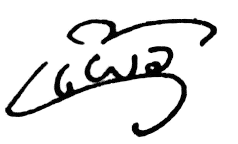

Thanphuying Paew Snidvongseni (Thai: แผ้ว สนิทวงศ์เสนี; RTGS: Phaeo Sanitwongseni, 25 December 1903 – 24 September 2000), née Paew Suddhiburana (Thai: แผ้ว สุทธิบูรณ์; RTGS: Phaeo Sutthibun), was an expert on classical Thai dance. She was married to Prince Asdang Dejavudh.

== Biography ==
Paew Suddhiburana was born on 25 December 1903. She was presented to the palace of Prince Asdang Dejavudh at the age of eight, and learned the art from royal instructors. She eventually married the prince, but the prince died young at the age of 36. Paew remarried to Mom Rajawongse Tan Snidvongs (titled Mom Snidvongseni), who was a diplomat, and she would observe the dance cultures of various countries during their frequent travels. She later joined the Fine Arts Department as an expert on Thai dance. She made new interpretations and created numerous dance styles, drawing inspiration from the foreign movements as well as traditional methods. For her contributions to the art, she was named National Artist in performing arts in its inaugural award in 1985.

== Royal Decorations ==
- - Order of Chula Chom Klao - 2nd Class lower
- - Order of the Crown of Thailand - Special Class (Thailand)
