= Ko Sichang district =

Ko Sichang เกาะสีชัง
- District
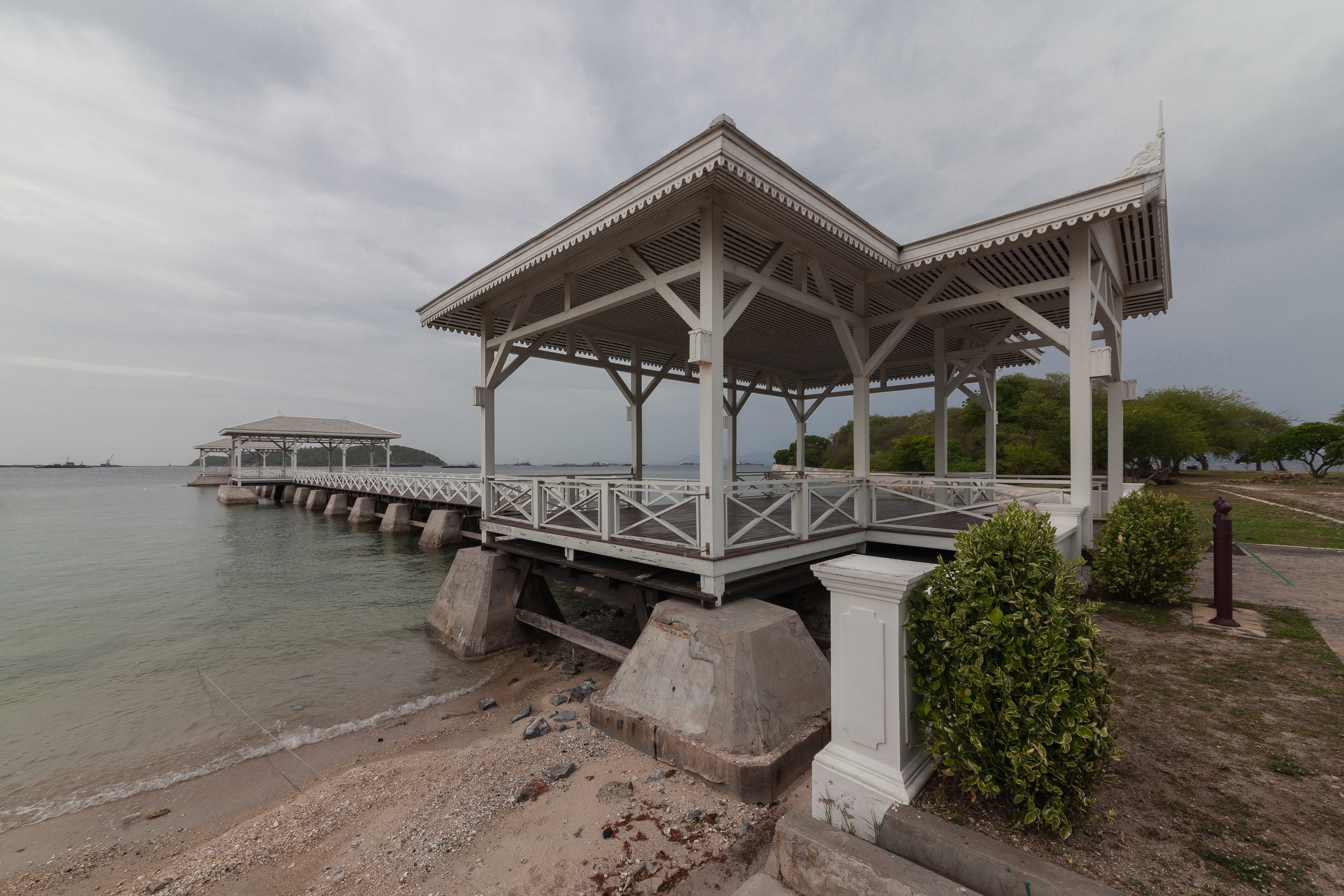
- Phra Chuthathut Palace

- District location in Chonburi province
- Coordinates: 13°09′48″N 100°48′30″E
- Country: Thailand
- Province: Chonburi
- Seat: Tha Thewawong

Area
  - Total: 17.3 km^{2} (6.7 sq mi)

Population (2005)
  - Total: 5,038
  - Density: 291/km^{2} (750/sq mi)
- Time zone: UTC+7 (ICT)
- Postal code: 20120
- Geocode: 2008

Ko Sichang (or Koh Sichang, Thai: เกาะสีชัง, pronounced [kɔ̀ʔ̚ sǐː.t͡ɕʰāŋ]) is a district (amphoe) of Chonburi province, Thailand. It consists of the island of Ko Sichang and its adjoining islands. Ko Sichang is in the Gulf of Thailand, 12 km off the shore of Si Racha district.

== History ==
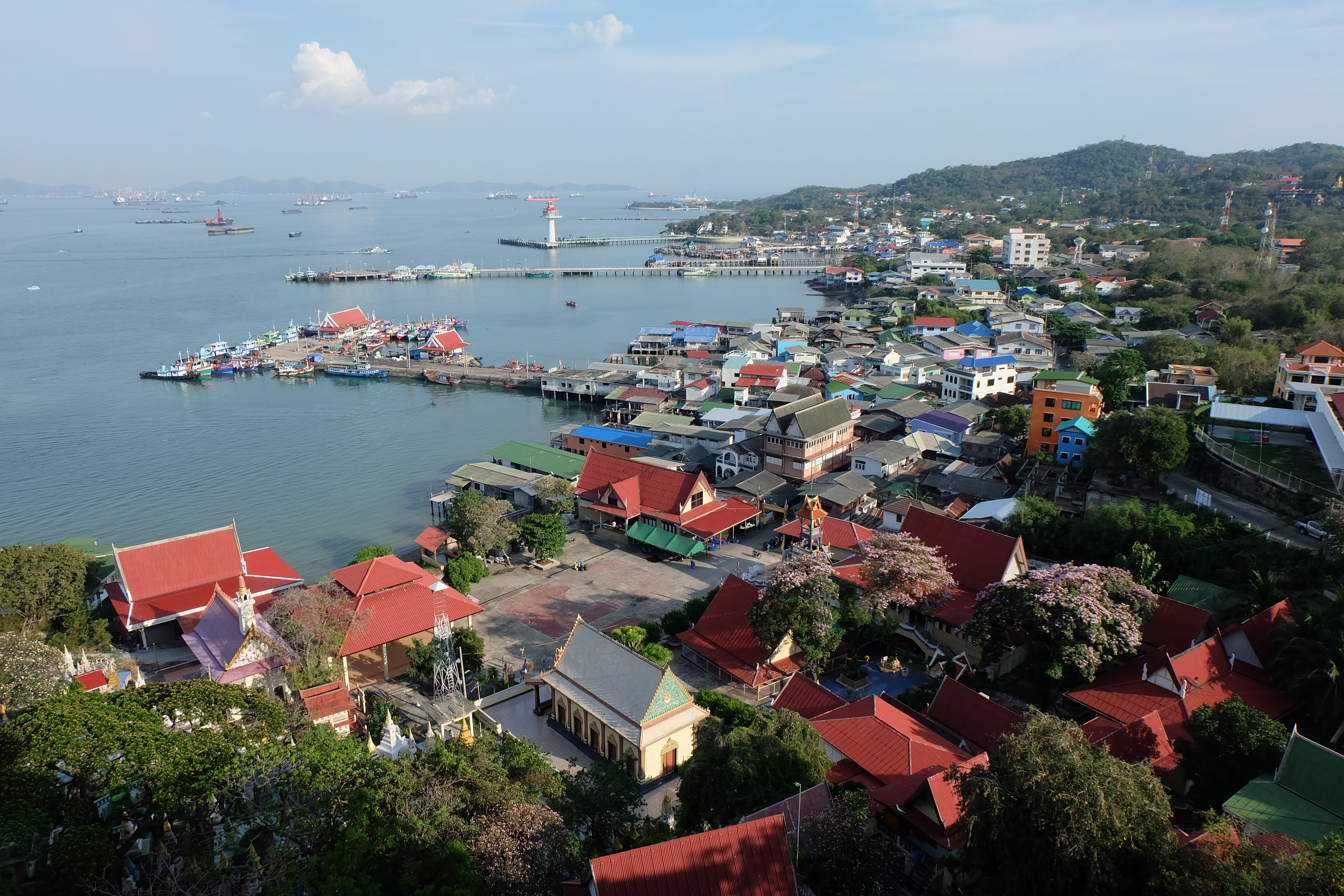
Town and piers of Ko Sichang, shot from the Chao Pho Khao Yai Shrine on the peak of Kaya Sira mount

Three kings of the Chakri Dynasty, King Rama IV, Rama V, and Rama VI, occasionally visited the island for rest. King Rama V built a summer palace, Phra Chuthathut Palace (Thai: พระจุฑาธุชราชฐาน), named after his son who was born on this island, Prince Chuthathut. The royal residence was largely abandoned in 1893 after the French occupied the island during a conflict with Thailand over control of neighboring Laos. In 1900, parts of the palace was torn down and reassembled as part of Vimanmek Mansion in Bangkok.

The British diplomat John Crawfurd, visiting the islands in 1822 during his mission, described the island in his book Journal of an embassy from the Governor-General of India to the courts of Siam and Cochin-China: exhibiting a view of the actual state of those kingdoms. He reported that Francis Buchanan-Hamilton called the islands of Ko Sichang District the "Dutch Islands", and Ko Sichang itself "Amsterdam", due to frequent visits by ships of the Dutch East India Company during the 17th century. American diplomat Edmund Roberts visited the island in the 1830s, describing the area as being occupied by "a few fisherman" who also grew yams, bananas, capsicums, gourds, and cucumbers.

The island was originally a minor district (king amphoe) under the Mueang Samut Prakan district of Samut Prakan province. On 1 January 1943, it was reassigned to the Si Racha district of Chonburi province. On 4 July 1994 the minor district was upgraded to a full district.

== Climate ==
Ko Sichang has a tropical savanna climate (Köppen climate classification Aw). Maximum temperatures remain fairly hot throughout the year, ranging from 29.6 °C (85.3 °F) in December to 32.9 °C (91.2 °F) in April. The monsoon season runs from May through October, with heavy rainfall.

Climate data for Ko Sichang (1991–2020, extremes 1959-present)
Month	Jan	Feb	Mar	Apr	May	Jun	Jul	Aug	Sep	Oct	Nov	Dec	Year
Record high °C (°F)	35.6 (96.1)	36.6 (97.9)	36.1 (97.0)	39.5 (103.1)	38.0 (100.4)	34.7 (94.5)	35.6 (96.1)	34.8 (94.6)	34.8 (94.6)	36.4 (97.5)	34.5 (94.1)	34.6 (94.3)	39.5 (103.1)
Mean daily maximum °C (°F)	30.7 (87.3)	31.3 (88.3)	32.0 (89.6)	33.1 (91.6)	32.8 (91.0)	32.2 (90.0)	31.7 (89.1)	31.5 (88.7)	31.2 (88.2)	31.4 (88.5)	31.2 (88.2)	30.5 (86.9)	31.6 (89.0)
Daily mean °C (°F)	26.7 (80.1)	27.7 (81.9)	28.8 (83.8)	29.8 (85.6)	29.8 (85.6)	29.5 (85.1)	29.0 (84.2)	28.8 (83.8)	28.3 (82.9)	27.7 (81.9)	27.5 (81.5)	26.7 (80.1)	28.4 (83.0)
Mean daily minimum °C (°F)	23.1 (73.6)	24.6 (76.3)	26.1 (79.0)	27.1 (80.8)	27.0 (80.6)	26.8 (80.2)	26.3 (79.3)	26.2 (79.2)	25.3 (77.5)	24.6 (76.3)	24.3 (75.7)	23.1 (73.6)	25.4 (77.7)
Record low °C (°F)	15.2 (59.4)	17.0 (62.6)	17.4 (63.3)	17.2 (63.0)	21.8 (71.2)	21.0 (69.8)	15.0 (59.0)	20.0 (68.0)	20.0 (68.0)	19.1 (66.4)	15.5 (59.9)	14.8 (58.6)	14.8 (58.6)
Average precipitation mm (inches)	21.6 (0.85)	19.3 (0.76)	46.6 (1.83)	72.3 (2.85)	127.0 (5.00)	135.9 (5.35)	109.7 (4.32)	131.5 (5.18)	241.2 (9.50)	199.8 (7.87)	41.5 (1.63)	8.6 (0.34)	1,155 (45.5)
Average precipitation days (≥ 1.0 mm)	1.3	1.5	3.2	4.2	9.6	9.8	9.8	10.4	14.8	12.6	3.1	1.2	81.5
Average relative humidity (%)	73.3	75.8	77.1	76.4	77.1	77.0	77.7	78.4	81.8	82.6	75.0	70.2	76.9
Average dew point °C (°F)	21.2 (70.2)	22.8 (73.0)	24.2 (75.6)	25.1 (77.2)	25.2 (77.4)	24.9 (76.8)	24.7 (76.5)	24.6 (76.3)	24.8 (76.6)	24.3 (75.7)	22.4 (72.3)	20.5 (68.9)	23.7 (74.7)
Mean monthly sunshine hours	240.6	224.4	252.4	243.2	199.5	155.6	154.6	149.2	146.6	175.6	221.5	233.8	2,397
Source 1: World Meteorological Organization
Source 2: Thai Meteorological Department (extremes)

== Administration ==
The district consists of a single sub-district (tambon) Tha Thewawong (ท่าเทววงษ์), which is further subdivided into seven villages (mubans). The district is completely covered by the township (thesaban tambon) Ko Sichang.

== Nearby islands ==
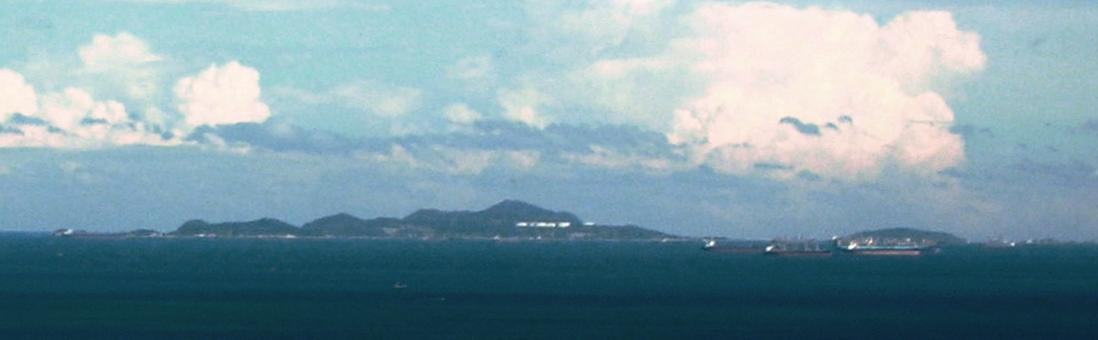
Ko Sichang and some nearby islands seen from the south.

- Ko Sampan Yue
- Ko Kham Noi
- Ko Kham Yai
- Ko Prong
- Ko Ran Dok Mai
- Ko Yai Thao
- Ko Khangkhao
- Ko Thai Ta Muen

== See also ==
- List of islands of Thailand
