= Pravitra Vadhanodom =

- Prince of Prachinburi
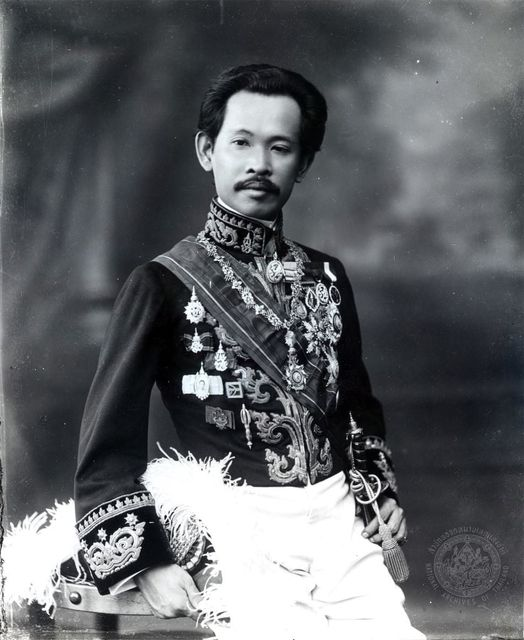

Royal Secretary
- Tenure: 24 June 1912 – 9 December 1919
- Successor: Chaophraya Mahithorn (La-or Krairoek)
- Born: May 27, 1875
- Died: December 9, 1919 (aged 44)
- Dynasty: Chakri
- Father: Chulalongkorn
- Mother: Chaem Krairiksh
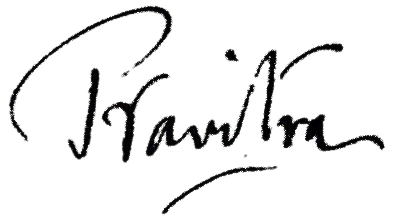
- Signature

Prince Pravitra Vadhanodom, Prince of Prachinburi (Thai: พระเจ้าบรมวงศ์เธอ กรมหลวงปราจิณกิติบดี; 27 May 1875 — 9 December 1919) was a privy councillor and royal secretary during the reign of King Vajiravudh, the founder of the Pravitra family.

== Life ==
=== Birth ===
Prince Pravitra Vadhanodom was the 15th son of King Chulalongkorn, born to Chao Chom Manda Chaem on May 27, 1875.

=== First Ordination ===
On Friday, May 8, 1885, he was ordained as a Samanera at Wat Phra Kaew, along with three other royal children, with His Royal Highness Prince Pavares Variyalongkorn as his preceptor. After the ordination, he resided at Wat Bowonniwet Vihara.

=== Education ===
He studied basic Thai language at the school of Phraya Sisunthonwohan and Suankularb Wittayalai School.

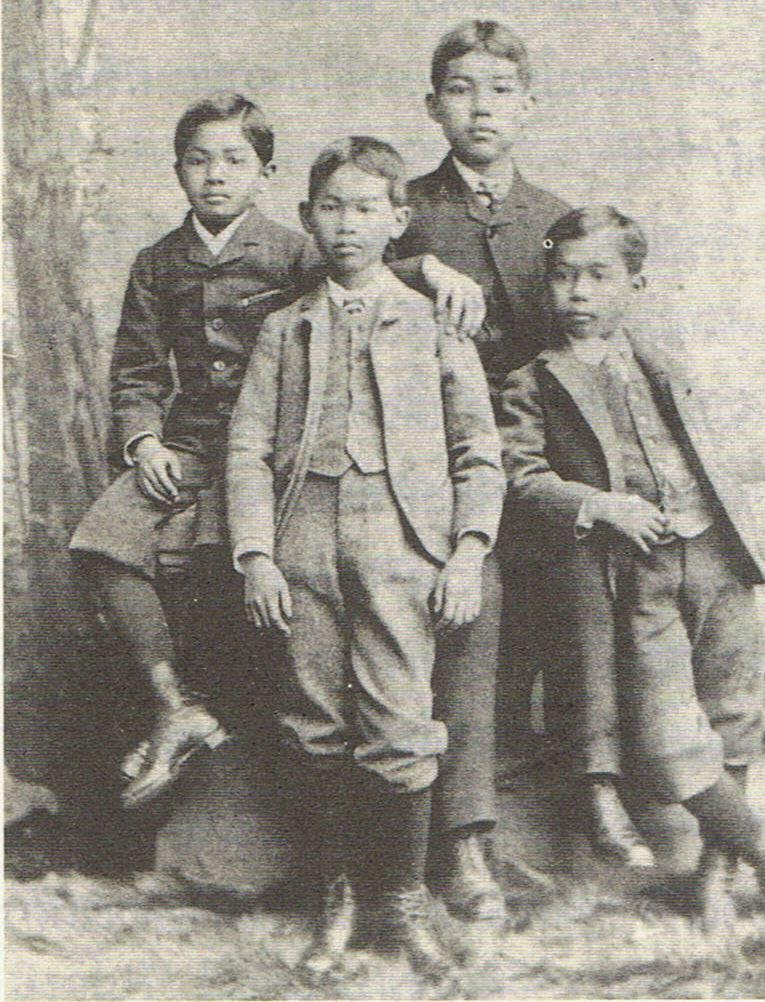

His Royal Highness Prince Pravitra Vadhanodom was the first of four sons of King Chulalongkorn who went to study in Europe in 1885 at the same time:

1. Prince Kitiyakara Voralaksana
2. Prince Raphi Phatthanasak
3. Prince Pravitra Vadhanodom
4. Prince Chirapravati Voradej

His Royal Highness Prince Pravitra Vadhanodom studied literature in England and France.

=== Second Ordination ===
On July 18, 1899, he was ordained as a monk at Wat Phra Kaew together with His Royal Highness Prince Kitiyakara Voralaksana, his half-older brother, and Mom Chao Butaratananop, with Somdej Phra Ariyavangsagatayana (Sa Pussadeva) as the preceptor and His Royal Highness Prince Vajirananavarorasa as the kammavachacariya. After the ordination, he resided at Wat Bowonniwet Vihara. He was ordained for 15 days before disrobing.

=== Civil service ===
His Royal Highness Prince Pravitra Vadhanodom began his civil service in the Office of the Royal Secretary. He was the personal secretary to Her Majesty Queen Saovabha Phongsri, when she was the regent during the first European tour of King Chulalongkorn in 1897. He was appointed a privy councilor during the reign of His Majesty King Vajiravudh and was promoted to the rank of Krom Luang Prachinkitibodi.

=== Death ===
His Royal Highness Prince Pravitra Vadhanodom fell ill and died of a kidney failure at the Palace on Luk Luang Road on December 9, 1919 at 11:00 p.m. at the age of 44.
