= The Royal Ordination Ceremony of Bhumibol Adulyadej =

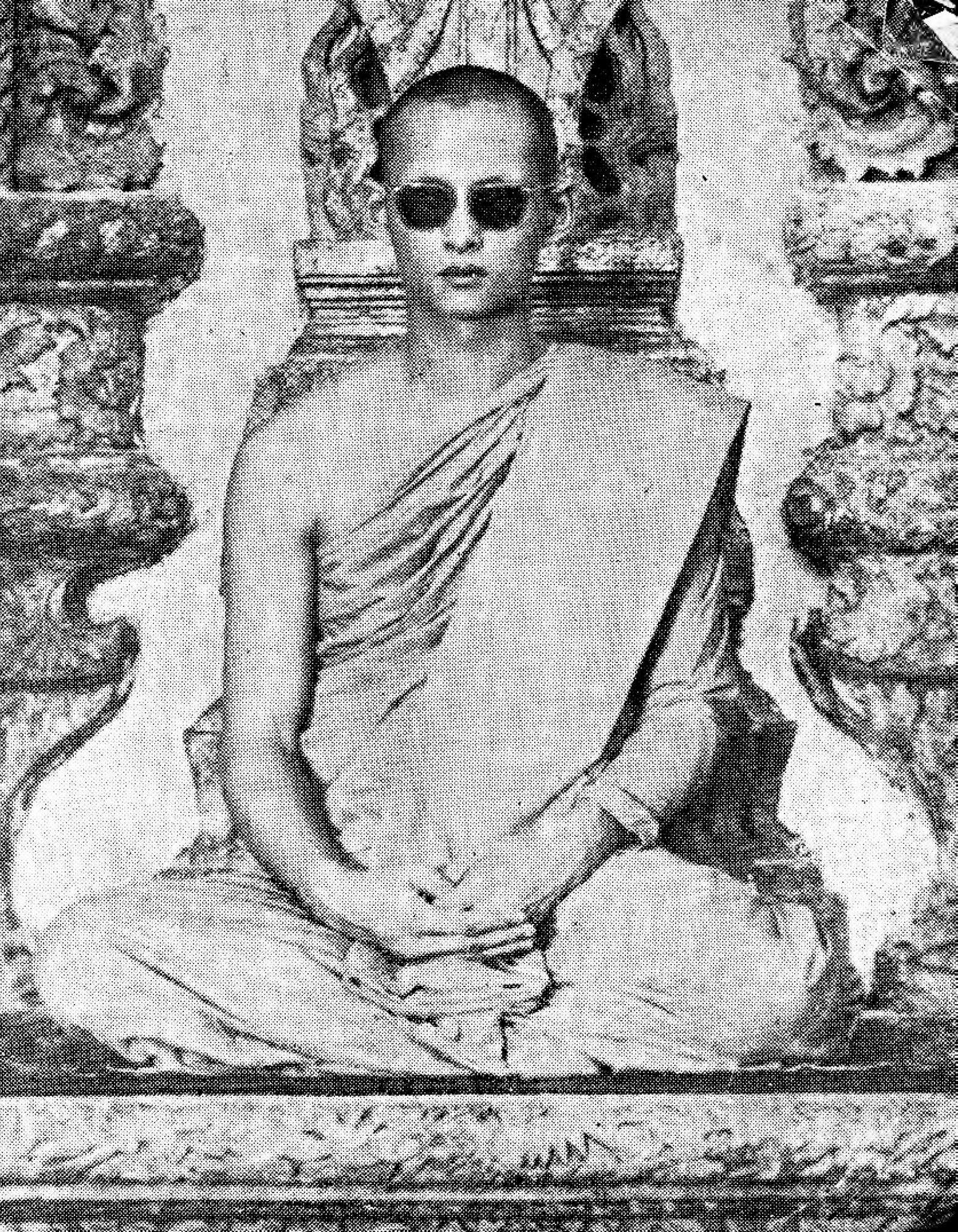
- Bhumibhalo Bhikkhu
- Date: October 22 – November 5, 1956
- Venue: Wat Phra Kaew (Ordination); Wat Boworn Niwet (to reside)
- Location: Phra Nakhon province Thailand
- Participants: Bhumibol Adulyadej
- Outcome: Sirikit as Regent

In 1956, Bhumibol Adulyadej, a devout buddhist with deep faith in Buddhism.He wished to be ordained as a Buddhist monk in accordance with royal tradition. Field Marshal Plaek Phibunsongkhram, the Prime Minister at the time, humbly offered to manage the royal ordination on behalf of the government and the Thai people. Additionally, with the approval of the 7th House of Representatives, He graciously appointed Sirikit to serve as regent.

Bhumibol Adulyadej was ordained as a Buddhist monk for a period of 15 days, from October 22 to November 5, 1956. The chronological events during his royal ordination are as follows:

== The Royal Ceremony ==
=== Thursday, October 18, 1956 ===
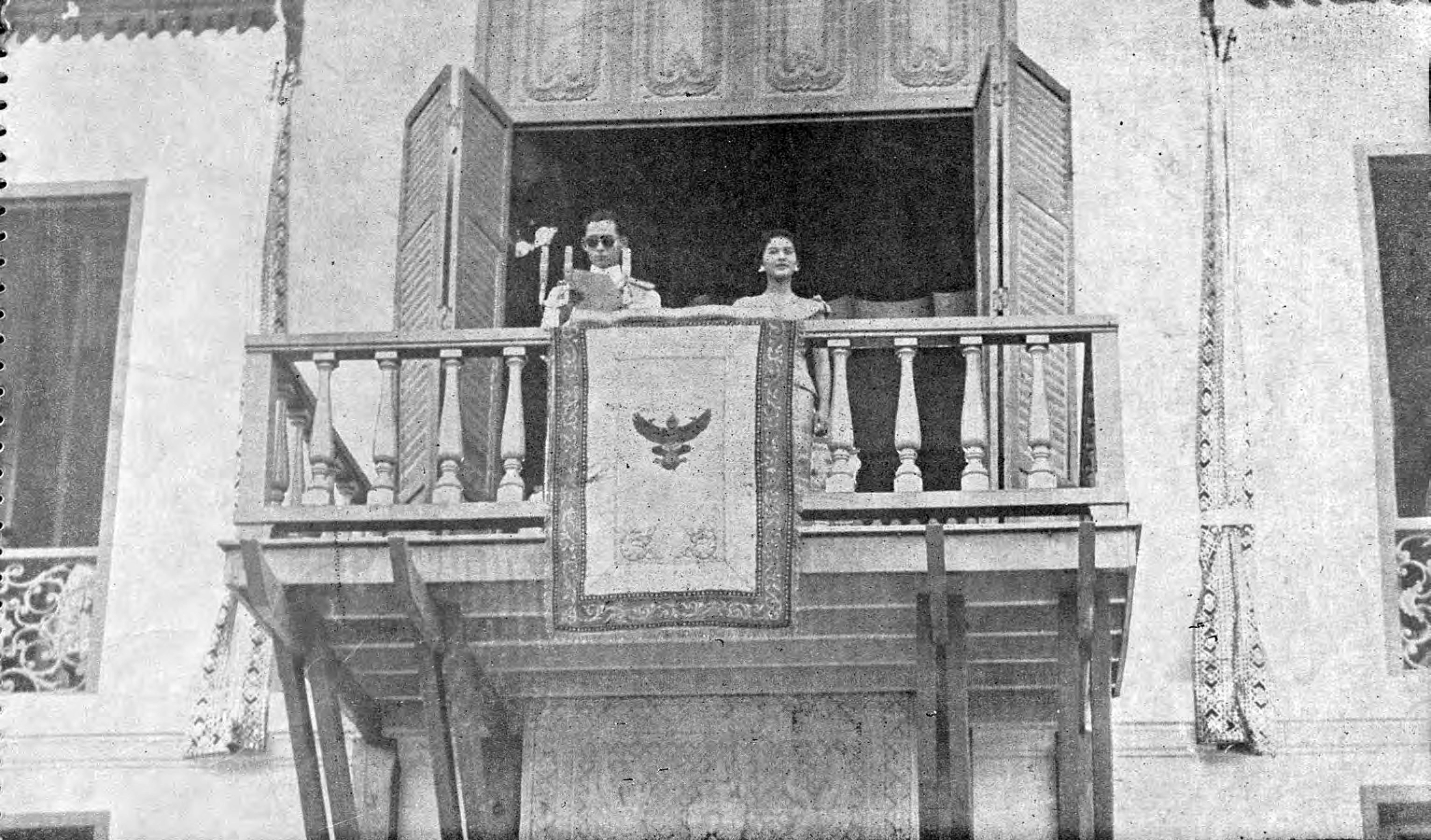
October 18, 1956: He appeared on the royal balcony of the Suddhaisavarya Prasad Throne Hall to announce his upcoming ordination to the public

Bhumibol Adulyadej granted an audience to members of the royal family, government officials, and the diplomatic corps at the Amarin Winitchai Throne Hall in the Grand Palace to announce his intention to be ordained. He also granted an audience to the public in front of the Suddhaisavarya Prasad Throne Hall, delivering a royal address, a part of which stated:

I am pleased that you all have gathered here today. I would like to take this opportunity to inform all citizens of my intention to be ordained into the monkhood.

=== Monday, October 22, 1956 ===
At 2:00 p.m., Bhumibol Adulyadej and Sirikit proceeded to Wat Phra Kaew. Prior to this, his hair was ritually cut, with the Princess Mother Srinagarindra cutting the first lock for auspiciousness. Clad in white robes, he lit incense and candles to pay respects to the Emerald Buddha, Phra Samphutthaphannee, and the statues of Rama I and Rama II. He then received the monastic robes from the Princess Mother and entered the holy ordination among the assembly of monks, presided over by the Supreme Patriarch (Somdej Phra Wachirayanawong). Following the ceremony, the newly ordained monk, who was given the monastic name 'Bhumibhalo,' accepted a robe offered by Sirikit in her capacity as Regent, followed by offerings from the Princess Mother.

Following that, Bhumibhalo Bhikkhu proceeded to the Phra Phuttha Rattana Sathan to undergo the Thalhikamma (the re-ordination ceremony according to the Thammayut tradition). The ceremony was predominated by the Supreme Patriarch (Somdej Phra Wachirayanawong) as his preceptor, and Phra Satsanasophon (Chuan Utthayi) as his ordination teacher. After completing the rituals according to royal traditions, he went to reside at Phra Tamnak Panya inside Wat Boworn Niwet. During his time in the monkhood, Bhumibhalo Bhikkhu strictly practiced monastic duties like all other monks. This included attending the ordination hall for morning and evening prayers, as well as studying the Dhamma and Vinaya (Buddhist doctrine and discipline). He also performed other special royal duties, such as:

=== Wednesday, October 24, 1956 ===
He traveled to Wat Phra Kaew to participate in the assembly of monks for the ordination ceremony of royal ordinands under royal patronage.

=== Sunday, October 28, 1956 ===
He traveled to receive food offerings from members of the royal family and government officials at the Amphorn Sathan Residential Hall. On this occasion, Vajiralongkorn, then the Prince, also attended to enter the royal presence.
