= 1977 in Thailand =

- Decades: 1950s; 1960s; 1970s; 1980s; 1990s
- See also: Other events of 1977; Timeline of Thai history

The year 1977 was the 196th year of the Rattanakosin Kingdom of Thailand. It was the 32nd year in the reign of King Bhumibol Adulyadej (Rama IX), and is reckoned as year 2520 in the Buddhist Era.

== Incumbents ==
- King: Bhumibol Adulyadej
- Crown Prince: Vajiralongkorn
- Prime Minister:
  - until 20 October: Thanin Kraivichien
  - 20 October - 10 November: National Revolutionize Council (junta)
  - starting 11 November: Kriangsak Chamanan
- Supreme Patriarch: Ariyavangsagatayana VII
