= 1851 in Siam =

- Decades: 1830s; 1840s; 1850s; 1860s; 1870s
- See also: Other events of 1851; Timeline of Siamese history

The year 1851 was the 70th year of the Rattanakosin Kingdom of Siam (now known as Thailand). It was the 28th and last year in the reign of King Nangklao (Rama III), and the first year in the reign of King Mongkut (Rama IV).

== Incumbents ==
- King:
  - until 2 April: Nangklao (Rama III); starting 2 April: Mongkut (Rama IV)
- Front Palace:
  - starting 25 May: Pinklao
- Supreme Patriarch:
  - starting 1 August: Paramanuchitchinorot

== Events ==
=== May ===
- May 15 - King Rama IV (Mongkut) is crowned, and takes as his wife Somanass Waddhanawathy. This is the first time foreigners have been invited to a coronation ceremony in Siam. The ceremony, which had previously been held according to Hindu rites, also incorporates the recitation of the Buddhist "Paritta Suttas".
- May 25 - Pinklao begins his tenure as Front Palace (vice-king) of Siam.

=== Ongoing ===
- Burmese–Siamese War (1849–55)
- France makes approaches to Siam, in an effort to establish trade relations.

== Deaths ==
- April 2 - Rama III, 63, King of Siam
- August 9 - Karl Gützlaff, 48, German missionary
