= 1975 in Thailand =

- Decades: 1950s; 1960s; 1970s; 1980s; 1990s
- See also: Other events of 1975; Timeline of Thai history

The year 1975 was the 194th year of the Rattanakosin Kingdom of Thailand. It was the 30th year in the reign of King Bhumibol Adulyadej (Rama IX), and is reckoned as year 2518 in the Buddhist Era.

== Incumbents ==
- King: Bhumibol Adulyadej
- Crown Prince: Vajiralongkorn
- Prime Minister:
  - until 26 February: Sanya Dharmasakti
  - 15 February – 13 March: Seni Pramoj
  - starting 14 March: Kukrit Pramoj
- Supreme Patriarch: Ariyavangsagatayana VII

== Events ==
=== January ===
- 57 primary school teachers quit in Yala province, sending 1,000 students back home. This was due to fears among teachers that they may face violence from separatists.
- 26 January - 1975 Thai general election

=== February ===
- 17 February - A 6.0 magnitude earthquake near the Myanmar border is felt in 9 provinces including Bangkok.
- 30 April - the Stock Exchange of Thailand officially starts trading.

== Births ==
- 17 June – Phiyada Akkraseranee, actress
