= 1987 in Thailand =

- Decades: 1960s; 1970s; 1980s; 1990s; 2000s
- See also: Other events of 1987; Timeline of Thai history

The year 1987 was the 206th year of the Rattanakosin Kingdom of Thailand. It was the 42nd year in the reign of King Bhumibol Adulyadej (Rama IX), and is reckoned as year 2530 in the Buddhist Era.

== Incumbents ==
- King: Bhumibol Adulyadej
- Crown Prince: Vajiralongkorn
- Prime Minister: Prem Tinsulanonda
- Supreme Patriarch: Ariyavangsagatayana VII

== See also ==
- 1987 in Thai television
- List of Thai films of 1987
