= 1875 in Siam =

- Decades: 1850s; 1860s; 1870s; 1880s; 1890s
- See also: Other events of 1875; Timeline of Siamese history

The year 1875 was the 94th year of the Rattanakosin Kingdom of Siam (now known as Thailand). It was the eighth year in the reign of King Chulalongkorn (Rama V).

== Incumbents ==
- Monarch: Chulalongkorn (Rama V)
- Front Palace: Wichaichan
- Supreme Patriarch: Pavares Variyalongkorn

== Events ==
- 2 January – The Front Palace crisis escalades when Prince Wichaichan, the second king, fled to the British Consulate claiming that his life was in danger. Chulalongkorn fails to convince him to leave. The king writes to Sir Andrew Clarke the Governor of the Straits Settlements for help.
- 18 February – Sir Andrew Clarke arrives from Singapore and begins negotiations between the two kings to resolve the dispute and misunderstanding between them.
- 24 February – Prince Wichaichan agrees to a settlement and signs the document. The prince would remain as Front Palace, with all former privileges, however his private army and navy must be disbanded.
- 6 April – A total eclipse of the Sun occurred in parts of Siam.
- 14 April – King Chulalongkorn created the Ministry of the Treasury (later renamed the Ministry of Finance) by splitting the Ministry of Ports. The remainder of the Ministry of Ports was reorganised and renamed the Ministry of Foreign Affairs. Both reorganisations were part of the king's modernization of the government.
- 5 December – Monsignor Jean-Louis Vey was appointed Apostolic Vicar of Siam until 1908.

=== Exact date unknown ===
- The Revenue Department was created to collected taxes.
- The Telegram Department was created, its first office was located near the Ministry of Defence building in Bangkok. The first telegram was sent from Bangkok to nearby Samut Prakan. The service was originally reserved for official use only, at 12 satang per word. The service survived until 2008. Its first director was Prince Bhanurangsi Savangwongse, the king's brother.
- King Chulalongkorn granted a house to the French ambassador to Siam for use as a residence.
- The Haw wars; the Royal Siamese Army crossed the Mekong River at Nong Khai and commenced an advance against Chinese Black Flag forces based at Chiang Kham. The Chinese refused to give battle and instead retreated into the mountains. The Siamese army later crossed back into Siam without having destroyed the bandits.

== Ongoing ==
- Haw wars (1865–1890)
- Front Palace crisis (28 December 1874–25 February 1875)
