= 1967 in Thailand =

- Decades: 1940s; 1950s; 1960s; 1970s; 1980s
- See also: Other events of 1967; Timeline of Thai history

The year 1967 was the 186th year of the Rattanakosin Kingdom of Thailand. It was the 22nd year in the reign of King Bhumibol Adulyadej (Rama IX), and is reckoned as year 2510 in the Buddhist Era.

== Incumbents ==
- King: Bhumibol Adulyadej
- Crown Prince: (vacant)
- Prime Minister: Thanom Kittikachorn
- Supreme Patriarch: Ariyavongsagatanana V

== Events ==
=== June ===
- 6-29- King Bhumibol Adulyadej and Queen Sirikit visits the United States for a second time.

== Births ==
- 21 June - Yingluck Shinawatra, Former Thai Prime Minister
