= 1973 in Thailand =

- Decades: 1950s; 1960s; 1970s; 1980s; 1990s
- See also: Other events of 1973; Timeline of Thai history

The year 1973 was the 192nd year of the Rattanakosin Kingdom of Thailand. It was the 28th year in the reign of King Bhumibol Adulyadej (Rama IX), and is reckoned as year 2516 in the Buddhist Era. It most significantly marked by the 14 October uprising, which toppled the military government of Thanom Kittikachorn.

== Incumbents ==
- King: Bhumibol Adulyadej
- Crown Prince: Vajiralongkorn
- Prime Minister:
  - until 14 October: Thanom Kittikachorn
  - starting 14 October: Sanya Dharmasakti
- Supreme Patriarch:
  - until 7 December: Ariyavangsagatayana VI
