= 1979 in Thailand =

- Decades: 1950s; 1960s; 1970s; 1980s; 1990s
- See also: Other events of 1979; Timeline of Thai history

The year 1979 was the 198th year of the Rattanakosin Kingdom of Thailand. It was the 34th year in the reign of King Bhumibol Adulyadej (Rama IX), and is reckoned as year 2522 in the Buddhist Era.

== Incumbents ==
- King: Bhumibol Adulyadej
- Crown Prince: Vajiralongkorn
- Prime Minister: Kriangsak Chamanan
- Supreme Patriarch: Ariyavangsagatayana VII
