= 1971 in Thailand =

- Decades: 1950s; 1960s; 1970s; 1980s; 1990s
- See also: Other events of 1971; Timeline of Thai history

The year 1971 was the 190th year of the Rattanakosin Kingdom of Thailand. It was the 26th year in the reign of King Bhumibol Adulyadej (Rama IX), and is reckoned as year 2514 in the Buddhist Era.

== Incumbents ==
- King: Bhumibol Adulyadej
- Crown Prince: (vacant)
- Prime Minister: Thanom Kittikachorn
- Supreme Patriarch:
  - until 18 December: Ariyavangsagatayana V
