= 1974 in Thailand =

- Decades: 1950s; 1960s; 1970s; 1980s; 1990s
- See also: Other events of 1974; Timeline of Thai history

The year 1974 was the 193rd year of the Rattanakosin Kingdom of Thailand. It was the 29th year in the reign of King Bhumibol Adulyadej (Rama IX), and is reckoned as year 2517 in the Buddhist Era.

== Incumbents ==
- King: Bhumibol Adulyadej
- Crown Prince: Vajiralongkorn
- Prime Minister: Sanya Dharmasakti
- Supreme Patriarch:
  - starting 22 June: Ariyavangsagatayana VIII

== Births ==
- 15 June – Saysunee Jana, wheelchair fencer
