= 1982 in Thailand =

- Decades: 1960s; 1970s; 1980s; 1990s; 2000s
- See also: Other events of 1982; Timeline of Thai history

The year 1982 was the 201st year of the Rattanakosin Kingdom of Thailand, which celebrated its bicentenary on 6 April. It was the 37th year in the reign of King Bhumibol Adulyadej (Rama IX), and is reckoned as year 2525 in the Buddhist Era.

The year saw several assassination attempts and tensions with the Communist insurgency, culminating in several terrorist attacks.

== Incumbents ==
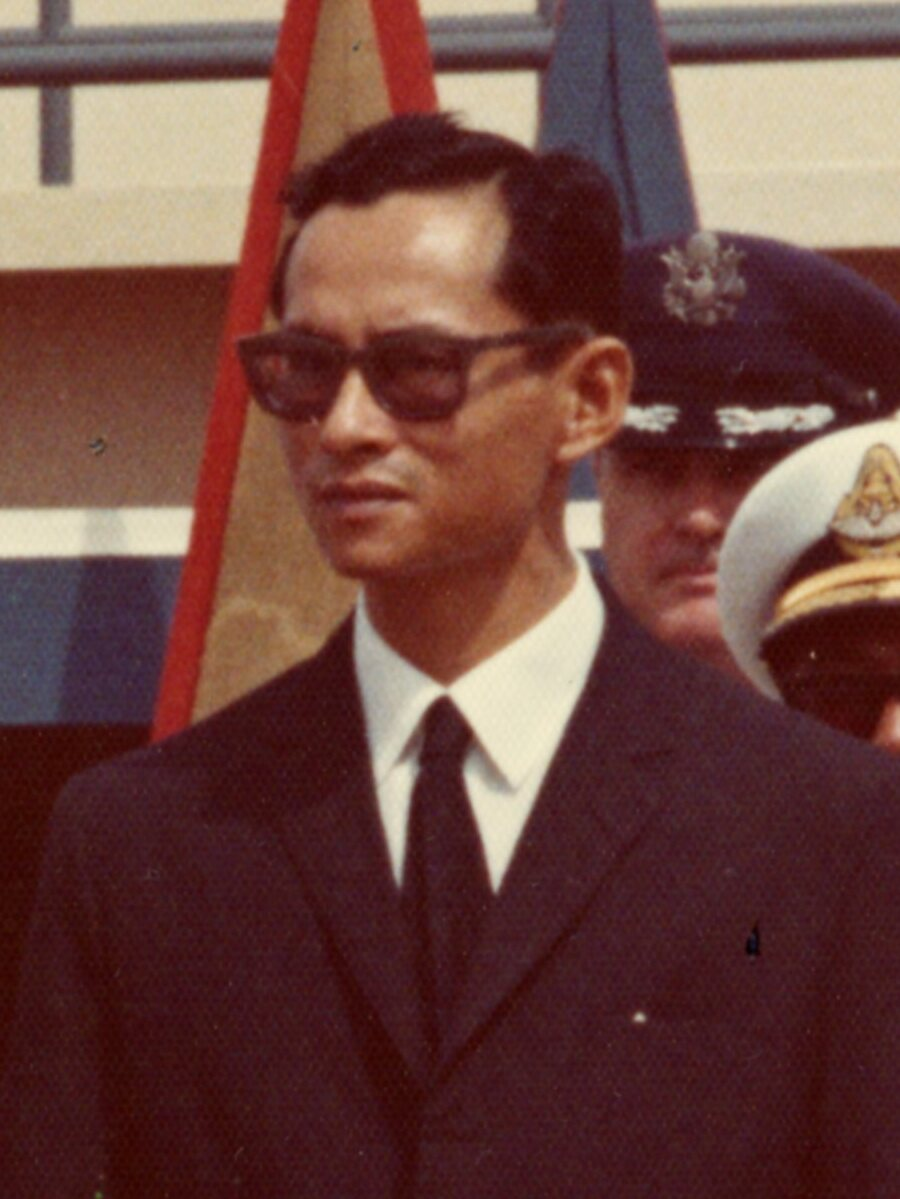
King
Bhumibol Adulyadej

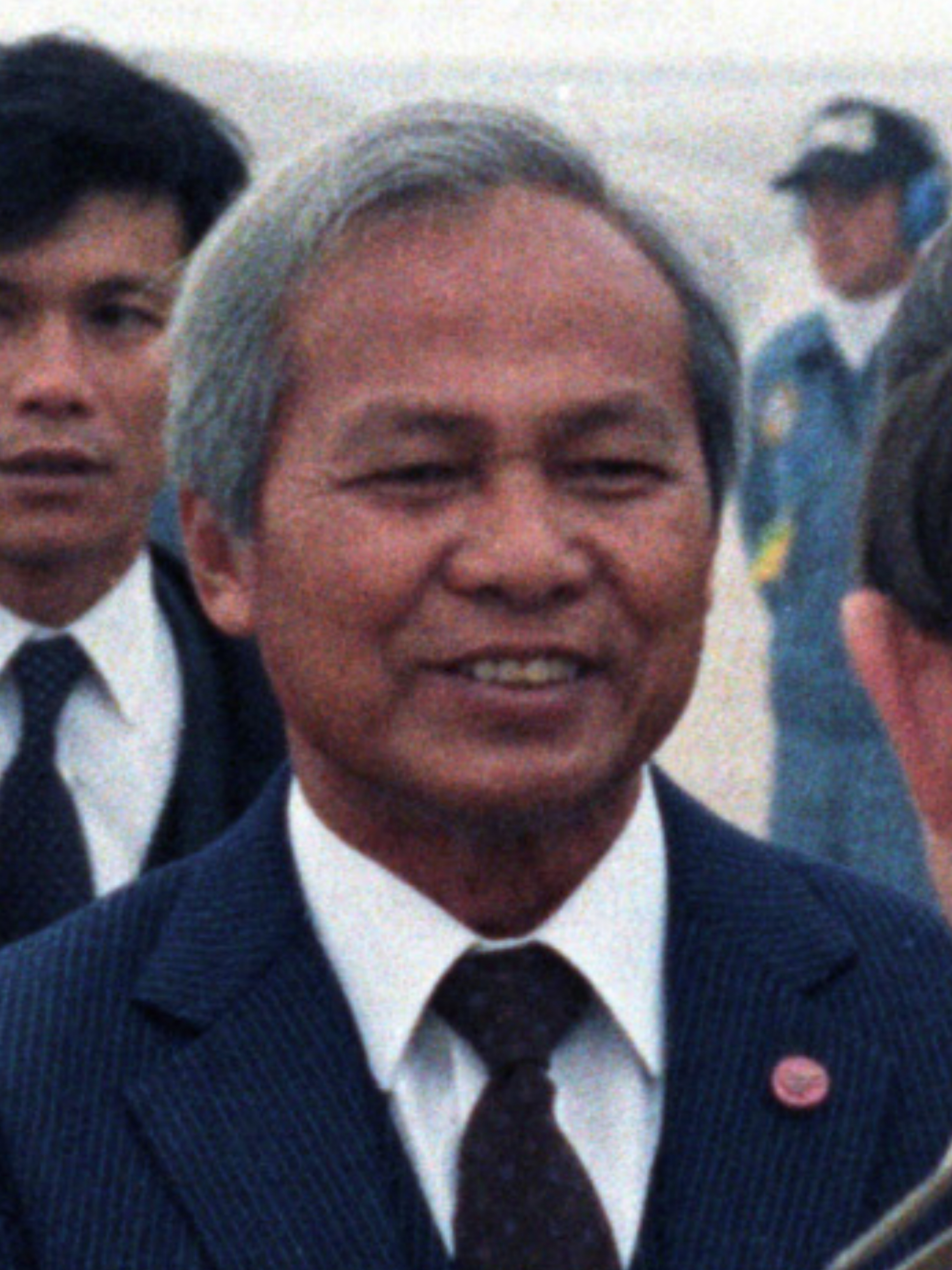
Prime-minister
Prem Tinsulanoda

- King: Bhumibol Adulyadej
- Crown Prince: Vajiralongkorn
- Prime Minister: Prem Tinsulanonda
- Supreme Patriarch: Ariyavangsagatayana VIII

== Events ==
=== January ===
- Date unknown: Thai soldiers and police battle with Khun Sa for four days before Khun Sa is forced back into Myanmar.

=== April ===
- April 6 - Bangkok and the Chakri dynasty celebrate their bicentennials. The King and Queen Sirikit led a flotilla of 51 royal barges down the Chao Phraya river in Bangkok along with other members of the royal family. The King, Queen, Crown Prince and his then wife Soamsawali, were all carried down the river in the Suphannahong. The day was declared a national holiday by the government.

=== March ===
- March 6–7 - Plans for an assassination attempt on general Arthit Kamlang-ek were discovered.
- March 8–25 - Another attempt on Arhit's life was attempted when he was visiting his hospitalized wife.
- March 20 - A bomb exploded in the provincial headquarters in Surat Thani. The Thai Communist insurgency is believed responsible, whilst the attack caused 4 deaths and 50 injuries.

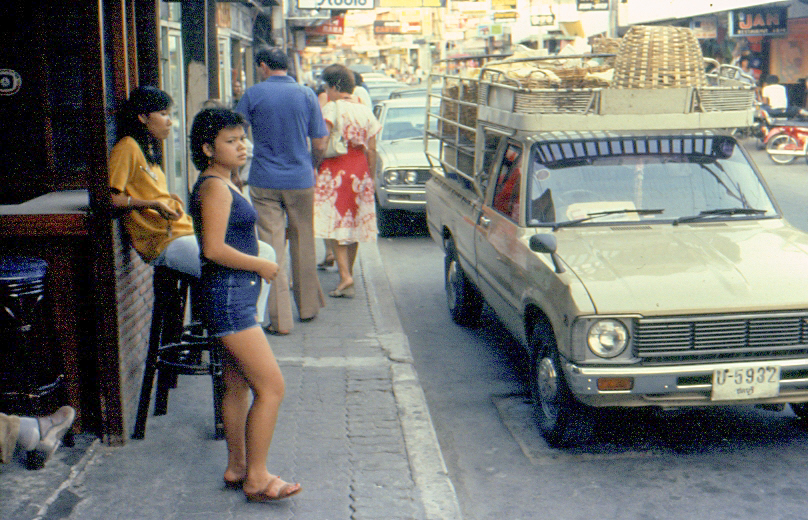
Bangkok Street in 1982

=== May ===
- May 5 - A car exploded opposite of Arhit's residence in front of Santirat Commercial School. It was planned to explode when he arrived home but exploded earlier than intended.
- May 6 - Thaksin bridge is opened by the King and Queen.

=== June ===
- June 3 - Another plan for an assassination attempt on Arhit was discovered.

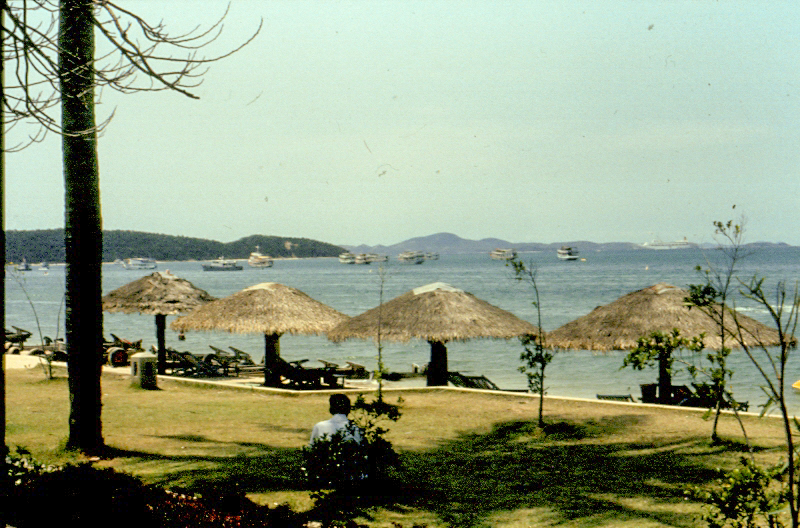
Pattaya in 1982

=== July ===
- July 16 - Prime-minister Prem Tinsulanoda presided over the inauguration of a statue of former Prime-minister Plaek Phibulsongkram in Lopburi province. 5 soldiers however fired a M-72 rocket at him, but instead struck a tree.
- July 25 - News of the assassination attempt on Prem appears in public news for the first time.

=== August ===
- August 5 and 7 - The five soldiers responsible for the July assassination attempt on Prem were arrested. Two however escaped. Major Pairat, who was one of the two, went into hiding in a house in Bangkok until his house was surrounded by police. He committed suicide before being arrested.
- August 15 - A hand grenade was thrown into the Prime-minister's house, causing only structural damage.

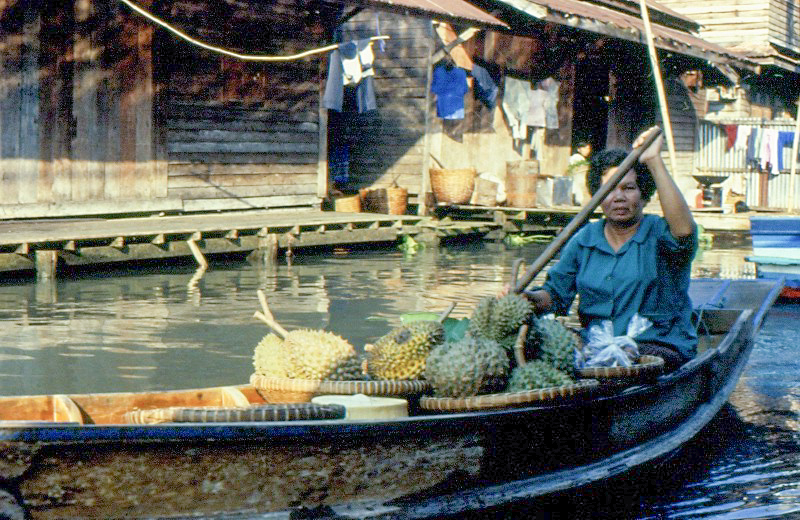
Thai woman selling durians at the Bangkok floating market

=== September ===
- September 9 - A bomb explodes near the Ministry of Defence, injuring four officers. This occurred below the floor of the Prime-minister's office.
- September 13 - Don Muang security guards discover a time bomb within the departure lounge. The bomb failed to explode.

=== October ===
- October 1 - Opening ceremony of the Queen's Cup. Preparations were made for an assassination attempt on the Thai Royal Family during the opening of the Queen's Cup.
- October 17 - 3rd plans for an assassination on Arhit's life were discovered.
- October 20 - Closing ceremony of the Queen's Cup. More plans to assassinate the Royal Family along with general Prem Lapol Art were discovered.
- October 24 - Deputy Commerce Minister, Thavee Kraikupt, resigns with other high-ranking officials over bribery accusations.
- October 26 - 20 Members of parliament signed a partition which urges the Prime-minister to use his emergency powers against Communist insurgents.
- October 28 - General Arthit Kamlang-ek announces on all four television channels the creation of a new emergency police telephone number, which aims to supplement the already present 191 number for the police. He also told viewers to summon the army with the number 123.
- October 31 - More plans for an assassination on Arhit's life were discovered.

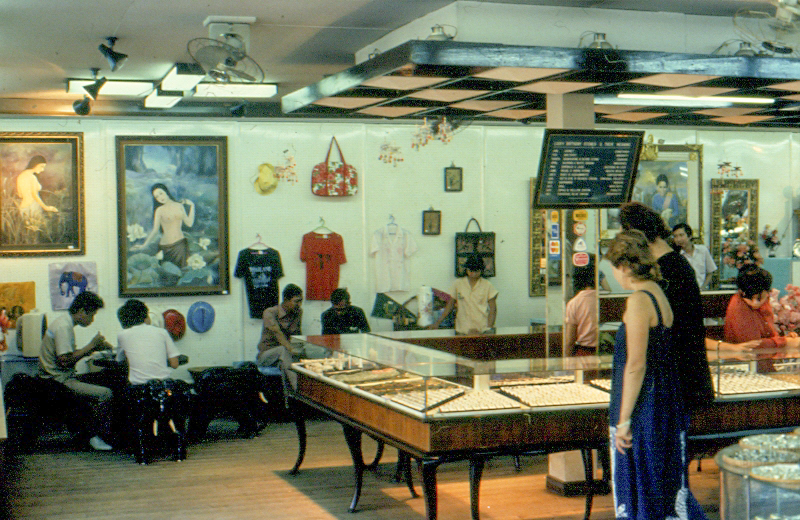
Bangkok tourist shop

=== November ===
- November 19 - Thailand participates at the 1982 Asian Games in Delhi, India. They earned 10 medals in total through until December 4.

=== December ===
- December 1 - Around 1,000 Thai Communists lay down their weapons and surrender to the Thai government in Banbak, Sakon Nakhon province. This is the largest surrender, with 250 of the Communists being guerrilla fighters whilst the other 750 supported them through various means.
