= 1900 in Siam =

- Decades: 1880s; 1890s; 1900s; 1910s; 1920s
- See also: Other events of 1900; Timeline of Siamese history

The year 1900 was the 119th year of the Rattanakosin Kingdom of Siam (now known as Thailand). It was the 33rd year in the reign of King Chulalongkorn (Rama V) and is reckoned as years 118 (1 January – 31 March) and 119 (1 April – 31 December) in the Rattanakosin Era.

== Incumbents ==
- Monarch: Chulalongkorn (Rama V)
- Crown Prince: Vajiravudh
- Supreme Patriarch: Ariyavangsagatayana (Sa Pussadeva)

== Events ==
- 23 February – King Chulalongkorn gives the Phra Racha Wang Derm (or Thonburi Palace) to the Royal Siamese Navy, the Naval Academy later moved into the compound.
- 25 May – King Chulalongkorn arrives in Kota Bharu and meets with Sultan Muhammad IV of Kelantan on board his royal yacht.
- 21 December – The Bangkok to Khorat rail line was officially opened, with a branch line to Lopburi also under construction.

== Births ==
11 May – Pridi Banomyong was born in Ayutthaya Province
