= 1983 in Thailand =

- Decades: 1960s; 1970s; 1980s; 1990s; 2000s
- See also: Other events of 1983; Timeline of Thai history

The year 1983 was the 202nd year of the Rattanakosin Kingdom of Thailand. It was the 38th year in the reign of King Bhumibol Adulyadej (Rama IX), and is reckoned as year 2526 in the Buddhist Era.

== Incumbents ==
- King: Bhumibol Adulyadej
- Crown Prince: Vajiralongkorn
- Prime Minister: Prem Tinsulanonda
- Supreme Patriarch: Ariyavangsagatayana VII

== See also ==
- 1983 in Thai television
- List of Thai films of 1983
