= 1957 in Thailand =

- Decades: 1930s; 1940s; 1950s; 1960s; 1970s
- See also: Other events of 1957; Timeline of Thai history

The year 1957 was the 176th year of the Rattanakosin Kingdom of Thailand. It was the 12th in the reign of King Bhumibol Adulyadej (Rama IX), and is reckoned as year 2500 in the Buddhist Era.

== Incumbents ==
- King: Bhumibol Adulyadej
- Crown Prince: (vacant)
- Prime Minister:
  - until 16 September: Plaek Phibunsongkhram
  - 16 - 21 September: National Revolutionize Council (junta)
  - 21 September - 26 December: Pote Sarasin
  - 26 - 31 December: National Revolutionize Council (junta)
- Supreme Patriarch: Vajirananavongs

== Events ==
=== January ===
- 1 January - Lèse majesté in Thailand is strengthened to include "insult" and changed to a crime against national security, after the Thai criminal code of 1956 went into effect.

=== July ===
- 4 July - Queen Sirikit gives birth to a fourth child and third daughter Chulabhorn.

== Births ==
- 4 July - Chulabhorn Thai Princess
