= 1969 in Thailand =

- Decades: 1940s; 1950s; 1960s; 1970s; 1980s
- See also: Other events of 1969; Timeline of Thai history

The year 1969 was the 188th year of the Rattanakosin Kingdom of Thailand. It was the 24th year in the reign of King Bhumibol Adulyadej (Rama IX), and is reckoned as year 2512 in the Buddhist Era.

== Incumbents ==
- King: Bhumibol Adulyadej
- Crown Prince: (vacant)
- Prime Minister: Thanom Kittikachorn
- Supreme Patriarch: Ariyavongsagatanana V

== Events ==
- 28-30 June - King Bhumibol Adulyadej welcomed and met US President Richard Nixon for a visit.
