= 1972 in Thailand =

- Decades: 1950s; 1960s; 1970s; 1980s; 1990s
- See also: Other events of 1972; Timeline of Thai history

The year 1972 was the 191st year of the Rattanakosin Kingdom of Thailand. It was the 27th year in the reign of King Bhumibol Adulyadej (Rama IX), and is reckoned as year 2515 in the Buddhist Era.

== Incumbents ==
- King: Bhumibol Adulyadej
- Crown Prince:
  - starting 28 December: Vajiralongkorn
- Prime Minister: Thanom Kittikachorn
- Supreme Patriarch:
  - starting 21 July: Ariyavangsagatayana VI
