= 1976 in Thailand =

- Decades: 1950s; 1960s; 1970s; 1980s; 1990s
- See also: Other events of 1976; Timeline of Thai history

The year 1976 was the 195th year of the Rattanakosin Kingdom of Thailand. It was the 31st year in the reign of King Bhumibol Adulyadej (Rama IX), and is reckoned as year 2519 in the Buddhist Era. It is most significantly marked by the Thammasat University massacre on 6 October, which brought an end to a three-year period of civilian rule.

== Incumbents ==
- King: Bhumibol Adulyadej
- Crown Prince: Vajiralongkorn
- Prime Minister:
  - until 20 April: Kukrit Pramoj
  - 20 April – 6 October: Seni Pramoj
  - 6 October - 8 October: National Administrative Reform Council (junta)
  - starting 8 October: Thanin Kraivichien
- Supreme Patriarch: Ariyavangsagatayana VII
