= 1965 in Thailand =

- Decades: 1940s; 1950s; 1960s; 1970s; 1980s
- See also: Other events of 1965; Timeline of Thai history

The year 1965 was the 184th year of the Rattanakosin Kingdom of Thailand. It was the 20th year in the reign of King Bhumibol Adulyadej (Rama IX), and is reckoned as year 2508 in the Buddhist Era.

== Incumbents ==
- King: Bhumibol Adulyadej
- Crown Prince: Vajiralongkorn
- Prime Minister: Thanom Kittikachorn
- Supreme Patriarch:
  - until 15 May: Ariyavongsagatanana IV
  - starting 25 November: Ariyavongsagatanana V

== Events ==
=== July ===
- 24 July - Miss Thailand Apasra Hongsakula won the crown title of the Miss Universe 1965 held in Miami Beach, Florida, United States.
