= 1985 in Thailand =

- Decades: 1960s; 1970s; 1980s; 1990s; 2000s
- See also: Other events of 1985; Timeline of Thai history

The year 1985 was the 204th year of the Rattanakosin Kingdom of Thailand. It was the 40th year in the reign of King Bhumibol Adulyadej (Rama IX), and is reckoned as year 2528 in the Buddhist Era.

== Incumbents ==
- King: Bhumibol Adulyadej
- Crown Prince: Vajiralongkorn
- Prime Minister: Prem Tinsulanonda
- Supreme Patriarch: Ariyavangsagatayana VII

== See also ==
- 1985 in Thai television
- List of Thai films of 1985
