= 1991 in Thailand =

- Decades: 1970s; 1980s; 1990s; 2000s; 2010s
- See also: Other events of 1991; Timeline of Thai history

The year 1991 was the 208th year of the Rattanakosin Kingdom of Thailand. It was the 46th year of the reign of King Bhumibol Adulyadej (Rama IX), and is reckoned as the year 2534 in the Buddhist Era. Significant events include the coup d'état against the government of Chatichai Choonhavan and the tragedy of Lauda Air Flight 004.

== Incumbents ==
- King: Bhumibol Adulyadej
- Crown Prince: Vajiralongkorn
- Prime Minister:
  - until 23 February: Chatichai Choonhavan
  - 24 February-2 March: National Peace Keeping Council (junta)
  - starting 2 March: Anand Panyarachun
- Supreme Patriarch: Nyanasamvara Suvaddhana

== Events ==
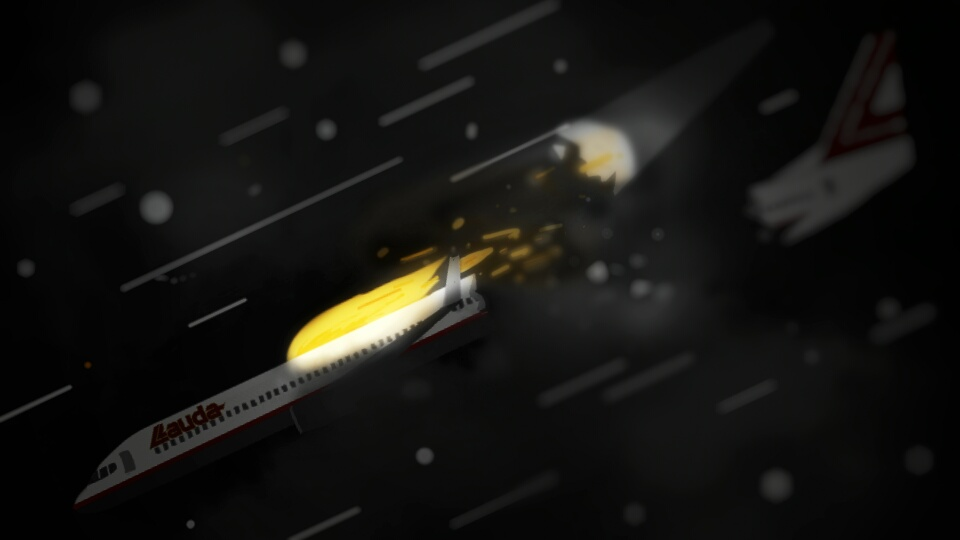
May 26, 1991: Lauda Air Flight 004 Tragedy

- 23 February – 1991 Thai coup d'état
- 26 May – Lauda Air Flight 004

== Births ==
- December 17 – Nadech Kugimiya, actor and model

== See also ==
- 1991 Thailand national football team results
