= 1978 in Thailand =

- Decades: 1950s; 1960s; 1970s; 1980s; 1990s
- See also: Other events of 1978; Timeline of Thai history

The year 1978 was the 197th year of the Rattanakosin Kingdom of Thailand. It was the 33rd year in the reign of King Bhumibol Adulyadej (Rama IX), and is reckoned as year 2521 in the Buddhist Era.

== Incumbents ==
- King: Bhumibol Adulyadej
- Crown Prince: Vajiralongkorn
- Prime Minister: Kriangsak Chamanan
- Supreme Patriarch: Ariyavangsagatayana VII

== Events ==
=== December ===
- 9-20- The 1978 Asian Games were held in Bangkok again for the third time.
