= 1980 in Thailand =

- Decades: 1960s; 1970s; 1980s; 1990s; 2000s
- See also: Other events of 1980; Timeline of Thai history

The year 1980 was the 199th year of the Rattanakosin Kingdom of Thailand. It was the 35th year in the reign of King Bhumibol Adulyadej (Rama IX), and is reckoned as year 2523 in the Buddhist Era.

== Incumbents ==
- King: Bhumibol Adulyadej
- Crown Prince: Vajiralongkorn
- Prime Minister:
  - until 3 March: Kriangsak Chamanan
  - starting 3 March: Prem Tinsulanonda
- Supreme Patriarch: Jinavajiralongkorn
