= 1981 in Thailand =

- Decades: 1960s; 1970s; 1980s; 1990s; 2000s
- See also: Other events of 1981; Timeline of Thai history

The year 1981 was the 200th year of the Rattanakosin Kingdom of Thailand. It was the 36th year in the reign of King Bhumibol Adulyadej (Rama IX), and is reckoned as year 2524 in the Buddhist Era.

== Incumbents ==
- King: Bhumibol Adulyadej
- Crown Prince: Vajiralongkorn
- Prime Minister: Prem Tinsulanonda
- Supreme Patriarch: Ariyavangsagatayana VII

== Events ==
=== March ===
- March 28 - Garuda Indonesia Flight 206 was hijacked and flown from Indonesia to Thailand.
- March 31 - At 2:40 pm in Bangkok, Indonesian commandos successfully rescued all hostages on board the hijacked Garuda Indonesia Flight 206, after getting permission from Thai authorities.

=== April ===
- April 3 - After two days, the attempted coup d'état was put down as thousands of troops took back control of Bangkok without a fight. Prime Minister Prem Tinsulanonda had taken King Bhumibol Adulyadej and the royal family with him to the city of Korat after General Sant Chipatima had seized control on Wednesday.
