= 1984 in Thailand =

- Decades: 1960s; 1970s; 1980s; 1990s; 2000s
- See also: Other events of 1984; Timeline of Thai history

The year 1984 was the 203rd year of the Rattanakosin Kingdom of Thailand. It was the 39th year in the reign of King Bhumibol Adulyadej (Rama IX), and is reckoned as year 2527 in the Buddhist Era.

== Incumbents ==
- King: Bhumibol Adulyadej
- Crown Prince: Vajiralongkorn
- Prime Minister: Prem Tinsulanonda
- Supreme Patriarch: Ariyavangsagatayana VII

== See also ==
- 1984 in Thai television
- List of Thai films of 1984
