= 1862 in Siam =

- Decades: 1840s; 1850s; 1860s; 1870s; 1880s
- See also: Other events of 1862; Timeline of Siamese history

The year 1862 was the 81st year of the Rattanakosin Kingdom of Siam (now known as Thailand). It was the twelfth year in the reign of King Mongkut.

== Incumbents ==
- King: Mongkut
- Front Palace: Pinklao
- Supreme Patriarch: Pavares Variyalongkorn

== Events ==
=== February ===
- 7 February- A Prussian envoy signed a friendship treaty with the Kingdom of Siam. This would be the foundation of modern day diplomatic relations between Germany and Thailand.

=== March ===
- 15 March- British Governess Anna Leonowens arrived in Bangkok with her son Louis to teach English to 82 children. There she met His Majesty King Mongkut.

== Births ==
- 21 June - Prince Tisavarakumarn is born in Bangkok.

== Deaths ==
- 18 June - Jean-Baptiste Pallegoix died in Bangkok.
