= 1986 in Thailand =

- Decades: 1960s; 1970s; 1980s; 1990s; 2000s
- See also: Other events of 1986; Timeline of Thai history

The year 1986 was the 205th year of the Rattanakosin Kingdom of Thailand. It was the 41st year in the reign of King Bhumibol Adulyadej (Rama IX), and is reckoned as year 2529 in the Vajiralongkorn

== Incumbents ==
- King: Bhumibol Adulyadej
- Prime Minister: Prem Tinsulanonda
- Supreme Patriarch: Ariyavangsagatayana VII

== Births ==
- November 10 – Nong-O Hama, Muay Thai kickboxer, Coach, and former ONE Bantamweight Muay Thai World Champion

== See also ==
- 2019in Thai television
- List of Thai films of 1986
