= 1966 in Thailand =

- Decades: 1940s; 1950s; 1960s; 1970s; 1980s
- See also: Other events of 1966; Timeline of Thai history

The year 1966 was the 185th year of the Rattanakosin Kingdom of Thailand. It was the 20th year in the reign of King Bhumibol Adulyadej (Rama IX), and is reckoned as year 2509 in the Buddhist Era.

== Incumbents ==
- King: Bhumibol Adulyadej
- Crown Prince: Vajiralongkorn
- Prime Minister: Thanom Kittikachorn
- Supreme Patriarch: Ariyavongsagatanana V

== Events ==
=== October ===
- 27-30 October - His Majesty King Bhumibol Adulyadej welcomed U.S. President Lyndon Johnson for a State Visit.

=== December ===
- 9-20 December - The 1966 Asian Games are held in Bangkok.
