= 1968 in Thailand =

- Decades: 1940s; 1950s; 1960s; 1970s; 1980s
- See also: Other events of 1968; Timeline of Thai history

The year 1968 was the 187th year of the Rattanakosin Kingdom of Thailand. It was the 23rd year in the reign of King Bhumibol Adulyadej (Rama IX), and is reckoned as year 2511 in the Buddhist Era.

== Incumbents ==
- King: Bhumibol Adulyadej
- Crown Prince: Vajiralongkorn
- Prime Minister: Thanom Kittikachorn
- Supreme Patriarch: Ariyavongsagatanana V
