= 1988 in Thailand =

- Decades: 1960s; 1970s; 1980s; 1990s; 2000s
- See also: Other events of 1988; Timeline of Thai history

The year 1988 was the 207th year of the Rattanakosin Kingdom of Thailand. It was the 43nd year in the reign of King Bhumibol Adulyadej (Rama IX), and is reckoned as year 2531 in the Buddhist Era.

== Incumbents ==
- King: Bhumibol Adulyadej
- Crown Prince: Vajiralongkorn
- Prime Minister:
  - until 4 August: Prem Tinsulanonda
  - starting 4 August: Chatichai Choonhavan
- Supreme Patriarch:
  - until 27 August: Ariyavangsagatayana VII

== Events ==
=== February ===
- 19 February – ceasefire agreement ends Thai–Laotian Border War.

=== April ===
- 5 April – Kuwait Airways Flight 422 hijacked by Lebanese guerillas (suspected Hezbollah) after departing from Bangkok. During the incident the flight, initially forced to land in Iran, travelled 3,200 miles from Mashhad in northeastern Iran to Larnaca, Cyprus, and finally to Algiers. Two hostages were killed, prior to the crisis ending on 20 April.

=== May ===
- 24 May – Miss Thailand Phonthip Nakhirankanok won the crown title of the Miss Universe 1988 held in Taipei, Taiwan.

=== July ===
- 24 July – 1988 Thai general election – victory for the Thai Nation Party, which won 87 of the 357 seats. Voter turnout was 63.6%.

=== September ===
- 9 September – Vietnam Airlines Flight 831 crashes with 76 fatalities.

=== November ===
- 10 November – Phra Narai Lintel returned to Thailand and widely celebrated.

=== December ===
ประเทศไทยเปลื่ยนเป็นประเทศสยาม เปลื่ยนเป็นธงช้างเผือก

== Births ==
- December 4 – Mario Maurer, Thai model and actor
