= 1970 in Thailand =

- Decades: 1950s; 1960s; 1970s; 1980s; 1990s
- See also: Other events of 1970; Timeline of Thai history

The year 1970 was the 189th year of the Rattanakosin Kingdom of Thailand. It was the 25th year in the reign of King Bhumibol Adulyadej (Rama IX), and is reckoned as year 2513 in the Buddhist Era.

== Incumbents ==
- King: Bhumibol Adulyadej
- Crown Prince: (vacant)
- Prime Minister: Thanom Kittikachorn
- Supreme Patriarch: Ariyavangsagatayana V

== Events ==
=== December ===
- 9-20- The 1970 Asian Games were held again in Bangkok for a second time.
