= 1960 in Thailand =

- Decades: 1940s; 1950s; 1960s; 1970s; 1980s
- See also: Other events of 1960; Timeline of Thai history

The year 1960 was the 179th year of the Rattanakosin Kingdom of Thailand. It was the 15th year in the reign of King Bhumibol Adulyadej (Rama IX). It is reckoned as year 2503 in the Buddhist Era.

== Incumbents ==
- King: Bhumibol Adulyadej
- Crown Prince: (vacant)
- Prime Minister: Sarit Thanarat
- Supreme Patriarch:
  - starting 4 May: Ariyavongsagatanana III

== Events ==
=== June ===
- 14 June - 14 July - 33 years after his birth in Cambridge, His Majesty King Bhumibol Adulyadej made the first of two return visits to the United States. And the rest of the Royal Family heads for a state visit.

== See also ==
- List of Thai films of 1960
- 1960 in Thai television
