= 1800 in Siam =

- Decades: 1780s; 1790s; 1800s; 1810s; 1820s
- See also: Other events of 1800; Timeline of Siamese history

The year 1800 was the 19th year of the Rattanakosin Kingdom of Siam (now known as Thailand). It was the nineteenth year in the reign of King Rama I.

== Incumbents ==
- Monarch: Rama I
- Front Palace: Maha Sura Singhanat
- Rear Palace: Anurak Devesh
- Supreme Patriarch: Ariyavangsayana (Suk)

== Events ==
- A fire spreads through the Chinatown neighbourhood in Bangkok.
