= 1958 in Thailand =

- Decades: 1930s; 1940s; 1950s; 1960s; 1970s
- See also: Other events of 1958; Timeline of Thai history

The year 1958 was the 177th year of the Rattanakosin Kingdom of Thailand. It was the 13th year in the reign of King Bhumibol Adulyadej (Rama IX), and is reckoned as year 2501 in the Buddhist Era.

== Incumbents ==
- King: Bhumibol Adulyadej
- Crown Prince: (vacant)
- Prime Minister:
  - 1 January - 20 October: Thanom Kittikachorn
  - starting 20 October: National Revolutionize Council (junta)
- Supreme Patriarch:
  - until 11 November: Vajirananavongs

== Births ==
- Vichai Srivaddhanaprabha, Thai billionaire businessman (d. 2018)

== See also ==
- List of Thai films of 1958
- 1958 in Thai television
