= 1959 in Thailand =

- Decades: 1930s; 1940s; 1950s; 1960s; 1970s
- See also: Other events of 1959; Timeline of Thai history

The year 1959 was the 178th year of the Rattanakosin Kingdom of Thailand. It was the 14th year in the reign of King Bhumibol Adulyadej (Rama IX), and is reckoned as year 2502 in the Buddhist Era.

== Incumbents ==
- King: Bhumibol Adulyadej
- Crown Prince: (vacant)
- Prime Minister:
  - until 9 February: National Revolutionize Council (junta)
  - starting 9 February: Sarit Thanarat
- Supreme Patriarch: (vacant)

== Deaths ==
- 9 February - Luang Pu Sodh Candasaro

== See also ==
- List of Thai films of 1959
- 1959 in Thai television
