= 1925 in Siam =

- Decades: 1900s; 1910s; 1920s; 1930s; 1940s
- See also: Other events of 1925; Timeline of Siamese history

The year 1925 was the 143rd year of the Rattanakosin Kingdom of Siam (now known as Thailand). It was the sixteenth and last year in the reign of King Vajiravudh (Rama VI) and first year in the reign of King Prajadhipok (Rama VII), and is reckoned as years 2467 (1 January – 31 March) and 2468 (1 April – 31 December) in the Buddhist Era.

== Incumbents ==
- Monarch: Vajiravudh (Rama VI) (until 26 November), Prajadhipok (Rama VII)
- Supreme Patriarch: Jinavorn Sirivaddhana

== Events ==
- 26 November – King Vajiravudh dies at the age of 44. He was succeeded by his younger brother and King Chulalongkorn's youngest son Prince Prajadhipok Sakdidej, the Prince of Sukhothai, who became Rama VII.

== Births ==
- 20 September - Prince Ananda Mahidol was born in Heidelberg, Germany.
- 24 November - Princess Bejaratana was born at the Grand Palace, Bangkok.

== Deaths ==
- 26 November - King Vajiravudh died at the Grand Palace, Bangkok.
