= 1992 in Thailand =

- Decades: 1970s; 1980s; 1990s; 2000s; 2010s
- See also: Other events of 1992; Timeline of Thai history

The year 1992 was the 211th year of the Rattanakosin Kingdom of Thailand. It was the 47th year of the reign of King Bhumibol Adulyadej (Rama IX), and is reckoned as the year 2535 in the Buddhist Era. It is most significantly the year which saw the events of Black May, a pivotal moment in Thailand's political history. 1992 was designated 'Thai Women's Tourist Year' by the government, in an effort to "promote the status of Thai women".

== Incumbents ==
- King: Bhumibol Adulyadej
- Crown Prince: Vajiralongkorn
- Prime Minister:
  - until 23 March: Anand Panyarachun
  - 7 April-24 May: Suchinda Kraprayoon
  - 24 May-10 June: Meechai Ruchuphan (acting)
  - 10 June-22 September: Anand Panyarachun
  - starting 20 September: Chuan Leekpai
- Supreme Patriarch: Nyanasamvara Suvaddhana

== Events ==
- 31 July – Thai Airways International Flight 311
- 12 August – Queen Sirikit's 60th birthday

== See also ==
- Miss Universe 1992
