= 1962 in Thailand =

- Decades: 1940s; 1950s; 1960s; 1970s; 1980s
- See also: Other events of 1962; Timeline of Thai history

The year 1962 was the 181st year of the Rattanakosin Kingdom of Thailand. It was the 17th year in the reign of King Bhumibol Adulyadej (Rama IX), and is reckoned as year 2505 in the Buddhist Era.

== Incumbents ==
- King: Bhumibol Adulyadej
- Crown Prince: (vacant)
- Prime Minister: Sarit Thanarat
- Supreme Patriarch:
  - until 17 June Ariyavongsagatanana III

== Events ==
- Establishment of Bangkok University
- October - Tropical Storm Harriet
- 25 December - Thai-language tabloid newspaper Thairath is founded
