= 1989 in Thailand =

- Decades: 1960s; 1970s; 1980s; 1990s; 2000s
- See also: Other events of 1989; Timeline of Thai history

The year 1989 was the 208th year of the Rattanakosin Kingdom of Thailand. It was the 44th year of the reign of King Bhumibol Adulyadej (Rama IX), and is reckoned as the year 2532 in the Buddhist Era.

== Incumbents ==
- King: Bhumibol Adulyadej
- Crown Prince: Vajiralongkorn
- Prime Minister: Chatichai Choonhavan
- Supreme Patriarch: Nyanasamvara Suvaddhana

== Events ==
- 31 August - The separatist group Patani Malays People's Consultative Council is founded.
- 4 November - Typhoon Gay makes landfall in Chumphon Province after having surprised forecasters in its development.

== Births ==
- February 8 – Chai Hansen, actor
