= 1990 in Thailand =

- Decades: 1970s; 1980s; 1990s; 2000s; 2010s
- See also: Other events of 1990; Timeline of Thai history

The year 1990 was the 209th year of the Rattanakosin Kingdom of Thailand. It was the 45th year of the reign of King Bhumibol Adulyadej (Rama IX), and is reckoned as the year 2533 in the Buddhist Era.

== Incumbents ==
- King: Bhumibol Adulyadej
- Crown Prince: Vajiralongkorn
- Prime Minister: Chatichai Choonhavan
- Supreme Patriarch: Nyanasamvara Suvaddhana

== Events ==
- 16 April - The Doi Luang National Park, covering areas in Chiang Rai, Lampang, and Phayao provinces, was inaugurated.
- 23 September – An accident with a tour boat capsized at Ubol Ratana Dam, Khon Kaen causing the deaths of 39 people.
- 24 September - 1990 Bangkok gas explosion, Bangkok, Thailand

== Births ==
- February 14 – Preechaya Pongthananikorn, model and actress
