= 1963 in Thailand =

- Decades: 1940s; 1950s; 1960s; 1970s; 1980s
- See also: Other events of 1963; Timeline of Thai history

The year 1963 was the 182nd year of the Rattanakosin Kingdom of Thailand. It was the 18th year in the reign of King Bhumibol Adulyadej (Rama IX), and is reckoned as year 2506 in the Buddhist Era.

== Incumbents ==
- King: Bhumibol Adulyadej
- Crown Prince: (vacant)
- Prime Minister:
  - until 8 December: Sarit Thanarat
  - starting 9 December: Thanom Kittikachorn
- Supreme Patriarch:
  - starting 4 May: Ariyavongsagatanana IV

== Deaths ==
- 8 December - Field Marshal Sarit Thanarat, Thai Prime Minister
