= 1850 in Siam =

- Decades: 1830s; 1840s; 1850s; 1860s; 1870s
- See also: Other events of 1850; Timeline of Siamese history

The year 1850 was the 69th year of the Rattanakosin Kingdom of Siam (now known as Thailand). It was the twenty-seventh year in the reign of King Rama III.

== Incumbents ==
- Monarch: Rama III
- Supreme Patriarch: Ariyavangsayana (Nag)

== Events ==
- March – Mission led by Joseph Balestier on behalf of the United States of America arrives in Bangkok to discuss trade and diplomatic treaties, mission fails to achieve anything.
- August – Mission led by James Brooke on behalf of the United Kingdom of Great Britain and Ireland arrives in Bangkok to discuss a new and more favourable trade treaty, mission fails to achieve anything.
