= 1825 in Siam =

- Decades: 1800s; 1810s; 1820s; 1830s; 1840s
- See also: Other events of 1825; Timeline of Siamese history

The year 1825 was the 44th year of the Rattanakosin Kingdom of Siam (now known as Thailand). It was the first year in the reign of King Rama III.

== Incumbents ==
- Monarch: Rama III
- Front Palace: Sakdiphonlasep
- Supreme Patriarch: Ariyavangsayana (Don)

== Events ==
- July – Negotiations between Siam and the United Kingdom of Great Britain and Ireland begins in Bangkok for what would be known later as the Burney Treaty, named after Henry Burney an agent of the British East India Company.
