= 1993 in Thailand =

- Decades: 1970s; 1980s; 1990s; 2000s; 2010s
- See also: Other events of 1993; Timeline of Thai history

The year 1993 was the 212th year of the Rattanakosin Kingdom of Thailand. It was the 48th year of the reign of King Bhumibol Adulyadej (Rama IX) and is reckoned as the year 2536 in the Buddhist Era.

== Incumbents ==
- King: Bhumibol Adulyadej
- Crown Prince: Vajiralongkorn
- Prime Minister: Chuan Leekpai
- Supreme Patriarch: Nyanasamvara Suvaddhana

== Births ==
- 18 March – Urassaya Sperbund, actress and model
- 24 March – Capitan Petchyindee Academy, Muay Thai kickboxer and South East Asian Games medalist
- 11 May – Jirapong Meenapra, Thai sprinter
- 13 June – Danial Williams, Thai-Australian Muay Thai kickboxer and mixed martial artist
- 21 July – Luksika Kumkhum, professional female tennis player

== See also ==
- 1993 in Thai television
- List of Thai films of 1993
