= 1932 in Siam =

- Decades: 1910s; 1920s; 1930s; 1940s; 1950s
- See also: Other events of 1932; Timeline of Siamese history

The year 1932 was the 151st year of the Rattanakosin Kingdom of Siam (now known as Thailand). It was the eighth year in the reign of King Prajadhipok (Rama VII), and is reckoned as year 2474 (1 January – 31 March) and 2475 (1 April – 31 December) in the Buddhist Era. The year is most notable in the history of Thailand as the year in which the abolition of absolute monarchy by the Khana Ratsadon took place, on 24 June.

== Incumbents ==
- King: Prajadhipok (Rama VII)
- Prime Minister: Phraya Manopakorn Nititada (starting 28 June)

== Events ==
- 6 April – Chakri dynasty celebrates its 150th anniversary of rule over Siam.
  - Opening of the Memorial Bridge by King Prajadhipok.
- 11 May - Siam took itself off the gold standard.
- 24 June – Siamese revolution of 1932, King Prajadhipok forced to accept demands by the Khana Ratsadon (or the People's party) to change the system of government from an absolute monarchy to a constitutional monarchy.
- 27 June - Promulgation of a temporary constitution of Siam by the People's party. The king later rejected this charter.
- 28 June - Phraya Manopakorn Nititada becomes the first prime minister.
- 10 December – Promulgation of the first permanent constitution by the king at the Ananta Samakhom Throne Hall. The National Assembly of Siam was established.

== Births ==
- 15 May - Chavalit Yongchaiyudh born in Nonthaburi.
- 9 August - Anand Panyarachun born in Bangkok.
- 19 August - Banharn Silpa-archa born in Suphanburi
