= Insult (legal) =

Infringement of another human's honor

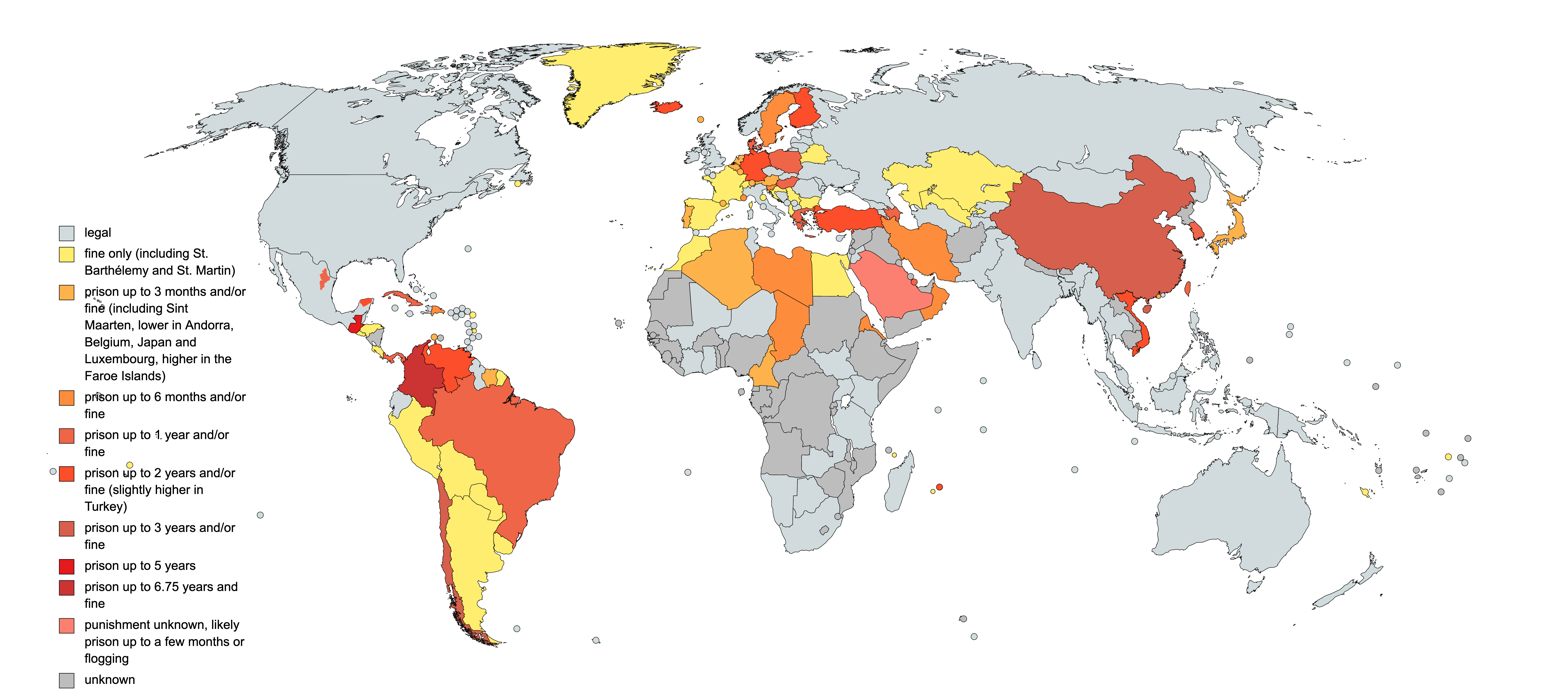
The legal status of insult

Insult is the infringement of another human's honor by whatsoever means of expression, in particular an offensive statement or gesture communicated, and is a crime in some countries. In a few countries seen as the same, in most the distinction between insult and defamation is that, from a focusing point of view, the former ascribes a value whereas the latter attributes or imputes a fact.

Insult is reserved to countries of civil law but a similar behavior in public can be considered public disorder in common law, especially in that of the United Kingdom and former colonies of the British Empire after 1776. The difference is that in civil law there is a personal target and the damaged legal good is their honor but in common law the public is targeted and the damaged legal good is the public order. The unlikeness persists also in public insults of civil law.

== Legal elements ==
=== Legal good ===
Cross-culturally and widely cited are honor or dignity as legal goods harmed but others named are esteem, consideration or, rather anachronistically, even decor. In the democratic states of East Asia, it is found to be credit or reputation, presumably in the sense or notion of honorability.

=== Means of expression ===
On the objective side, the means of expression can be a spoken, written or symbolic statement, a gesture, picture, other content like a video or non-violent assault that is regarded as offensive or injurious to honor.

On the subjective side, the commission requires an intent to insult the victim, sometimes called "contemptuous intent". This is only brought into question when the offensive or insulting quality of, for example, a statement has remained sufficiently unclear.

The act of expression has to be communicated to either the victim or a third person.

=== Justification ===
Justifications are frequently the exercise of official duties like statements during trial and the scope of civil rights and liberties, which notably includes freedom of speech e.g. in politics, science, arts or literature or some kinds of activities in those. Very narrowly, the self-defense of honor may function as a justification but reciprocal insults are not considered as self-defenses of honor. Authoritarian or one-party states are not expected to allow for criticism of their governing and politics when it comes to insult.

=== Prosecution ===
Prosecution nearly always requires a complaint by the victim.

=== Freeing from punishment ===
In cases of reciprocal insults, the judge can oftentimes free either one or both the accused from punishment. Contrasting with this, in China no such exception is made.

== Laws by jurisdiction ==
=== Africa ===
==== Algeria ====
Insult (Arabic: سَبَّة, sabba, French: injure) is punishable by prison up to three months or a fine from 10,000 DZD (ca. $78.50) to 25,000 DZD (ca. $196) or both.

==== Angola ====
Insult (injúria) is punishable by prison up to six months or by a fine up to 60 daily units.

==== Benin ====
Public insult (injure) is punishable by a fine from 500,000 XOF (ca. $923) to 2,000,000 XOF (ca. $3,694).

==== Burkina Faso ====
Public insult (injure) is punishable by prison up to six months and by a fine from 250,000 XOF (ca. $461) to 1,000,000 XOF (ca. $1,847).

==== Burundi ====
Public insult (injure) is punishable by prison up to one year, a fine from 10,000 BIF (ca. $5.01) to 100,000 BIF (ca. $50.18) or both.

==== Cameroon ====
Public insult (injure) is punishable either by prison from five days to three months, a fine from 5,000 XAF (ca. $8.96) to 100,000 XAF (ca. $179) or both.

==== Chad ====
Public insult (injure) not through press is punishable by prison up to six months or a fine from 25,000 XAF (ca. $41) to 50,000 XAF (ca. $82.50) or both.

==== Egypt ====
Public insult (سَبَّة, sabba) is punishable by a fine from 2,000 EGP (ca. $126) to 10,000 EGP (ca. $633). If the insult is published in a newspaper or elsewhere, the penalty is a fine from 4,000 EGP (ca. $253) to 20,000 EGP (ca. $1,266).

==== Eritrea ====
Insult is punishable by prison up to one month or by a fine from 1 ERN (ca. $0.06) to 1,000 ERN (ca. $66.50). If the insult is grossly obscene, refers to the profession or is otherwise severe, the penalty is prison up to six months or a fine from 5,001 ERN (ca. $333) to 20,000 ERN (ca. $1,333).

==== Gabon ====
Public insult (injure) is punishable by prison up to six months, a fine up to 1,000,000 XAF (ca. $1,847) or both.

==== Guinea ====
Public insult (injure) is punishable by prison up to three months, a fine from 500,000 GNF (ca. $49.19) to 1,000,000 GNF (ca. $98.38) or both.

==== Libya ====
Insult is punishable by prison up to six months or by a fine up to 25 LYD (ca. $18). Libyan criminal law may still be applied despite the transitional Government of National Accord and military occupations.

==== Mauritius ====
Insult (injure) is punishable by a fine up to 50,000 MUR (ca. $1,223). Mauritius is one of a few countries with mixed common and civil law that explicitly names the crime of insult, according to the Napoleonic model. If the insult is committed in public, the penalty is a fine up to 100,000 MUR (ca. $2,447). For publicly written insult, the penalty is prison up to two years and a fine up to 100,000 MUR.

==== Morocco ====
Public insult (سَبَّة, sabba) is punishable by a fine from 5,000 MAD (ca. $543) to 50,000 MAD (ca. $5,430).

==== Mozambique ====
Insult (injúria) is punishable by a fine up to three monthly units. If the insult is committed in public or divulged publicly, the penalty is prison up to six months and a fine up to six monthly units. For insult by assault in public, the penalty is prison up to one year and a fine up to 12 monthly units.

==== Rwanda ====
Public insult (Kinyarwanda: gutukana, French: injure) is punishable by prison from 15 days to two months, a fine from 100,000 RWF (ca. $100) to 200,000 RWF (ca. $200) or public work up to 15 days.

==== Togo ====
Public insult (injure) is punishable by a fine from 100,000 XOF (ca. $183) to 500,000 XOF (ca. $919).

=== Asia ===
==== Azerbaijan ====
Public insult (təhqir) is punishable either by prison up to six months, a fine from 1,000 AZN (ca. $588) to 1,500 AZN (ca. $882), income subtraction from 5% to 20% for up to one year or public work from 60 to 120 days. If the insult is committed with a pseudonymous profile or account in the Internet, the penalty is either prison up to one year, a fine from 1,000 AZN to 2,000 AZN (ca. $1,176), income subtraction from 5% to 20% for up to two years or public work from 90 to 120 days.

==== Cambodia ====
Public insult (ប្រមាថជាសាធារណៈ) is punishable by a fine ranging from KHR 100,000 (ca. USD 25) to KHR 10,000,000 (ca. USD 2,500). Insulting a public official, or a holder of public office acting in discharge of their official functions, is punishable by imprisonment from one day to six days, and a fine from KHR 1,000 (ca. USD 0.25) to KHR 100,000. Insulting Buddhist monks, nuns and laymen, in the exercise or the occasion of the exercise of their functions is punishable by imprisonment from one day to six days and a fine from KHR 1,000 to KHR 100,000.

Furthermore, Cambodia amended its Criminal Code in 2018 to include lèse-majesté provisions, according to which, insulting the King is punishable by imprisonment from one to five years, and a fine of KHR 2,000,000 (ca. USD 500) to KHR 10,000,000. In addition to this, juridical persons may be subject to fines ranging from KHR 10,000,000 to KHR 50,000,000 (ca. USD 12,500), as well as other sanctions.

==== China ====
Serious public insult (侮辱, wǔrǔ) by assault or other means is punishable by prison up to three years, intermediary detention up to six months or public surveillance up to two years. If the insult by assault is too serious, it may be subsidiary to violent crimes instead. China has got the most conditions for criminal insult. In Macau, insult (Chinese: 侮辱, wǔrǔ, Portuguese: injúria) is punishable by prison up to three months or by a fine up to 120 daily units.

==== Iran ====
Satirization is punishable by prison up to six months.

==== Japan ====
Public insult (侮辱, bujoku) is punishable by prison up to one year or by a fine from ¥300,000.

==== Kazakhstan ====
Insult (қорлау, qorlay) is punishable by a fine of up to 100 monthly calculation indices. If the insult is committed in public, by mass media or telecommunication networks, the penalty is a fine of up to 200 monthly calculation indices.

==== Laos ====
Serious insult (ອັບອາຍ, apay) is punishable by prison up to one year or income subtraction from 5% to 20% for up to one year and either way a fine from 1,000,000 LAK (ca. $105) to 5,000,000 LAK (ca. $528).

==== Nepal ====
Scolding (गाली, gālī) is punishable by prison up to one year, a fine up to 10,000 NPR (ca. $84) or both.

==== Oman ====
Insult is punishable by prison up to three months, a fine from 100 OMR (ca. $259) to 300 OMR (ca. $777) or both. If the insult is committed in public, the penalty is prison up to six months, a fine from 200 OMR to 500 OMR (ca. $1,295) or both.

==== Qatar ====
Insult (سَبَّة, sabba) is punishable by prison up to three months or by a fine up to 1,000 QAR (ca. $272). If the insult is committed in public, the penalty is prison up to one year or a fine up to 5,000 QAR (ca. $1,362).

==== South Korea ====
Public insult (모욕, moyok) is punishable by prison up to one year or by a fine up to ₩2 million (ca. $1,600).

==== Taiwan ====
Public insult (侮辱, wǔrù) is punishable by prison up to two months or by a fine up to 9,000 TWD (ca. $297). If the insult is committed by assault, the penalty is prison up to one year or a fine up to 15,000 TWD (ca. $495).

==== Turkey ====
Insult (hakaret) is punishable by prison up to two years or by fine. If the insult is committed in public, the penalty is prison up to 2.33 years or a fine increased by up to a sixth.

==== Uzbekistan ====
Only the second insult (haqorat qilish) after an administrative measure is punishable either by a fine up to 200 basic calculation units, income subtraction from 10% to 30% for up to one year or up to 60 days of public work. If the insult is printed or otherwise reproduced, the penalty is either a fine from 200 to 400 basic calculation units, income subtraction from 10% to 30% for one to two years or public work from 60 to 75 days.

==== Vietnam ====
Serious insult (làm nhục) is punishable by a fine from 10,000,000 VND (ca. $421) to 30,000,000 VND (ca. $1,265) or community service up to three years, which means public work and partial income subtraction. For insult against someone who teaches, nurtures, cares for or cures the offender and for insult by means of a computer network, telecommunication network or electronic device, the penalty is prison up to two years.

=== Europe ===
==== Albania ====
Insult (fyerje) is punishable by a fine of 40,000 ALL (ca. $350) to 1 million ALL (ca. $8,350). If the insult is committed in public, the penalty is a fine from 40,000 ALL to 3 million ALL (ca. $25,100).

==== Andorra ====
Grave or public insult (injúria) is punishable by prison up to 1.57 months.

==== Austria ====
Insult (Beleidigung) or derision (Verspottung) in public or in front of multiple people is punishable by prison up to three months or by a fine up to 180 daily units.

==== Belarus ====
Insult (оскорбление, oskorblenie) in public, in a public work or telecommunication network is punishable by fine or restriction of liberty up to three years.

==== Belgium ====
Public insult (injure) or insult in front of someone else is punishable by prison up to two months or by a fine from €26 (ca. $28) to €500 (ca. $540).

==== Bulgaria ====
Insult (обида, obida) is punishable by a fine from 1,000 BGN (ca. $550) to 3,000 BGN (ca. $1,675). If the insult is committed in public, divulged through print or some other way, the penalty is a fine from 3,000 BGN to 10,000 BGN (ca. $5,570).

==== Croatia ====
Insult (uvreda) is punishable by a fine up to 90 daily units. If the insult is committed through press, radio, television, a public computer system or network, at a public gathering or otherwise made publicly accessible, the penalty is a fine up to 180 daily units.

==== Denmark ====
Dishonoring (ærekrænkelse) through words or other means is punishable by prison up to one year or by fine. In the Faroe Islands, dishonoring (ærumeiðing) through words or other conduct is punishable by prison up to four months or by fine. In Greenland, dishonoring (nikanarsaat) through words or another action is punishable by a fine.

==== France ====
Public insult (injure) is punishable by a fine up to €12,000 (ca. $14,543). The same applies also in the French overseas collectivities and New Caledonia.

==== Finland ====
Disparagement (halvennus) is punishable by fine. If the disparagement causes great suffering or damage and is gross on the whole, the penalty is prison up to two years or a fine. The comprising law is indifferently referred to as "defamation" (kunnianloukkaus) but also contains disparagement.

==== Germany ====
Insult (Beleidigung) is punishable by prison up to one year or by fine. If the insult is committed in public or by assault, the penalty is prison up to two years or a fine.

==== Greece ====
Insult (εξύβριση, exívrisi) is punishable by prison up to six months or by fine. If the insult is committed in public, the penalty is prison up to one year or a fine.

==== Hungary ====
Insult (becsületsértés) relating to the job, mandate or public interest or insult in front of a large audience is punishable by prison up to one year.

==== Iceland ====
Dishonoring (ærumeiðing) is punishable by prison up to one year or by fine. For serious insult (móðgun) against one's spouse, ex-spouse, child or close relative, the penalty is prison up to two years. Upbraiding (brigsl) without a reason is punishable by a fine.

==== Liechtenstein ====
Insult (Beleidigung) or derision (Verspottung) in front of someone else is punishable by prison up to one month or by a fine up to 60 daily units. If the insult occurs in public or in front of multiple people, the penalty is prison up to three months or a fine up to 180 daily units.

==== Luxembourg ====
Public insult (injure) or insult before multiple people is punishable by prison from eight days to two months, a fine from €251 (ca. $293) to €5,000 (ca. $5,856) or both. For insult against one's spouse, ex-spouse, close relative, an impaired, ill, pregnant or otherwise vulnerable person or a subordinate, the penalty is prison from 16 days to two months or a fine from €502 (ca. $587) to €5,000 or both.

==== Monaco ====
Public insult (injure) is punishable by prison from six days to two months, a fine from €2,250 (ca. $2,726) to €9,000 (ca. $10,907) or both. Public insult with a false name, identity or by another disguise is punishable by prison from six days to six months, a fine from €9,000 to €18,000 (ca. $21,814) or both.

==== Netherlands ====
Insult (belediging) not protecting public goods intentiously is punishable by prison up to three months or a fine up to €4,350 (ca. $4,739). In Sint Maarten, insult is punishable by prison up to three months or by a fine up to $250. In Aruba, it is punishable by prison up to three months or by a fine up to 300 AWG (ca. $165).

==== Poland ====
Insult (zniewaga) is punishable by fine or restriction of liberty. If the insult is committed by mass media, the penalty is either prison up to one year, a fine or restriction of liberty.

==== Portugal ====
Insult (injúria) is punishable by prison up to three months or by a fine up to 120 daily units.

Romania

Since 2006, insult is no longer a crime in Romania.

==== San Marino ====
Insult (ingiuria) in front of multiple people is punishable by a fine of 10 to 40 daily units.

==== Serbia ====
Insult (uvreda) is punishable by a fine from 20 to 100 daily units or from 40,000 RSD (ca. $367) to 200,000 RSD (ca. $1,835). If the insult is committed through the press, radio, television, other media or at a public gathering, the penalty is a fine from 80 to 240 daily units or from 150,000 RSD (ca. $1,376) to 450,000 RSD (ca. $4,130).

==== Slovenia ====
Insult (razžalitev) that, not contemptuously intended, does not pertain to a scientific, literary or artistic work, serious criticism, official duty, social or political activity, defense of a right or protection of justified benefits is punishable by prison up to three months or by fine. If the insult is committed through press, radio, television, on a website or through other media, the penalty is prison up to six months or a fine.

==== Spain ====
Insult (injuria) of grave nature, with these effects or circumstances according to public conception is punishable by a fine of 3 to 7 monthly units. If such insult is committed in public, the penalty is a fine from 6 to 14 monthly units.

==== Sweden ====
Insult (förolämpning) is punishable by fine. If the insult is gross, the penalty is prison up to six months or a fine.

==== Switzerland ====
Insult (German: Beschimpfung, French: injure, Italian: ingiuria, Romansh: ingiuria) is punishable by a fine up to 90 daily units.

=== North America and the Caribbean ===
==== Costa Rica ====
Insult (injuria) is punishable by a fine from 10 to 50 daily units. If the insult is committed in public, the penalty is a fine from 15 to 75 daily units.

==== Cuba ====
Insult (injuria) is punishable by prison up to one year or by a fine from 100 to 300 units.

==== Dominican Republic ====
Public insult (injuria) is punishable by prison up to six months and by fine.

==== El Salvador ====
Insult (injuria) is punishable by a fine from 50 to 100 daily units. If the insult is committed in public, the penalty is a fine from 100 to 180 daily units.

==== Guatemala ====
Insult (injuria) is punishable by prison up to one year. If the insult is divulged publicly and, unlikely, can provoke loathing or discredit or, more likely, attacks the related legal goods in front of society, the penalty is prison up to five years. The qualified version of the deed is indistinctively called "defamation" (difamación) both for calumny and insult.

==== Honduras ====
Insult (injuria) of grave nature, with these effects or circumstances according to public conception is punishable by a fine from 100 to 200 daily units. If such insult is committed in public, the penalty is a fine from 200 to 500 daily units.

==== Mexico ====
In Yucatán, insult (injuria) is punishable by prison from three days up to two years or by a fine from 2 to 20 daily units. In Nuevo León, insult (injuria) is punishable by prison from three days up to one year or by a fine from 1 to 10 units or both.

==== Panama ====
Insult (injuria) is punishable by a fine from 60 to 120 daily units. If the insult is committed by a communication network, the penalty is prison from six months up to one year or a fine.

=== South America ===
==== Argentina ====
Insult (injuria) not referring to or protecting public goods is punishable by a fine of 1,500 ARS (ca. $23) to 20,000 ARS (ca. $309).

==== Bolivia ====
Insult (injuria) by means of mass diffusion is punishable by a fine from 100 to 250 daily units.

==== Brazil ====
Insult (injúria) is punishable by prison up to six months or by fine. If the insult is committed by assault or is demeaning its nature or means, the penalty is prison up to one year and a fine.

==== Chile ====
Insult (injuria) is punishable by prison up to two months or by fine. Written or public insults are punishable by prison up to 1.48 years and by a fine from 6 to 10 monthly units. Written or public insults of affronting nature, occasion or circumstances according to public conception and written or public insults grave due to the state, dignity and circumstances of the offended one and the offender are punishable by prison up to three years and by a fine from 11 to 20 monthly units.

==== Colombia ====
Insult (injuria) by assault is punishable by prison up to 2.25 years and a fine from 7.16 to 750 monthly calculation units. For insult by assault in front of someone else, the penalty is prison up to 4.5 years and a fine from 13.33 to 1,500 monthly calculation units. If the insult by assault is simultaneously divulged publicly or committed at a public gathering, the penalty is prison up to 6.75 years and a fine from 15.46 to 2,250 monthly calculation units. The non-assaultive basic crime is by what it appears a more general kind of defamation due to the attributive characteristic.

==== Paraguay ====
Insult (injuria) is punishable by a fine up to 90 daily units. If the insult is committed in front of someone else, the penalty is a fine up to 180 daily units.

==== Peru ====
Insult (injuria) is punishable by a fine from 60 up to 90 daily units or by public work from 10 to 40 days.

==== Suriname ====
Insult (belediging) not protecting public goods intentiously is punishable by prison up to three months, a fine up to 10,000 SRD (ca. $1,329) or both.

==== Uruguay ====
Insult (injuria) is punishable by a fine from 60 UR (ca. $1,700) to 400 UR (ca. $11,450). If the insult is committed in public or divulged publicly, the penalty is a fine from 70 UR (ca. $2,000) to 533.33 UR (ca. $15,250).

==== Venezuela ====
Insult (injuria) before multiple people is punishable by prison up to one year and a fine from 50 to 100 tributary units. If the insult is committed to the address of the offended one, in writing or in public, the penalty is prison up to 1.33 years and a fine from 66.66 to 133.33 tributary units. For insult both in addressing of the offended one and in public, the penalty is prison up to 1.5 years and a fine from 75 to 150 tributary units. For insult in a public document, publicly divulged writings or other public media, the penalty is prison up to two years and a fine from 200 to 500 tributary units.
