= Thailand national football team results (1990–1999) =

This article lists the results for the Thailand national football team between 1990 and 1999.

- Only record the results that affect the FIFA/Coca-Cola World Ranking. See FIFA 'A' matches criteria.

== 1990 ==
Date	Opponent	Result	Score	Venue	Competition
29 January 1990	Kenya	W	2–1	Bangkok, Thailand	International Friendly
5 February 1990	Indonesia	D	1–1	Bangkok, Thailand	International Friendly
23 September 1990	Yemen	D	0–0	Beijing, China	1990 Asian Games – Group C
25 September 1990	Hong Kong	W	2–0	Beijing, China	1990 Asian Games – Group C
27 September 1990	Kuwait	W	2–1	Beijing, China	1990 Asian Games – Group C
1 October 1990	China	W	1–0	Beijing, China	1990 Asian Games – Quarterfinals
3 October 1990	North Korea	L	0–1	Beijing, China	1990 Asian Games – Semifinals
5 October 1990	South Korea	L	0–1	Beijing, China	1990 Asian Games – Third place

== 1991 ==
Date	Opponent	Result	Score	Venue	Competition
25 November 1991	Singapore	D	0–0	Manila, Philippines	1991 Southeast Asian Games – Group A
27 November 1991	Myanmar	W	4–0	Manila, Philippines	1991 Southeast Asian Games – Group A
2 December 1991	Philippines	W	6–2	Manila, Philippines	1991 Southeast Asian Games – Semifinals
4 December 1991	Indonesia	D	0–0(a.e.t.); 3–4(pen.)	Manila, Philippines	1991 Southeast Asian Games – Final
15 December 1991	Vietnam	D	2–2	Bangkok, Thailand	International Friendly

== 1992 ==
Date	Opponent	Result	Score	Venue	Competition
21 June 1992	South Korea	W	2–1	Bangkok, Thailand	1992 AFC Asian Cup qualification
23 June 1992	Bangladesh	W	1–0	Bangkok, Thailand	1992 AFC Asian Cup qualification
29 October 1992	Qatar	D	1–1	Hiroshima, Japan	1992 AFC Asian Cup – Group B
31 October 1991	China	D	0–0	Hiroshima, Japan	1992 AFC Asian Cup – Group B
2 November 1992	Saudi Arabia	L	0–4	Onomichi, Hiroshima, Japan	1992 AFC Asian Cup – Group B

== 1993 ==
Date	Opponent	Result	Score	Venue	Competition
7 February 1993	Malaysia	D	1–1	Kuala Lumpur, Malaysia	International Friendly (1993 Merdeka Tournament)
9 February 1993	Singapore	D	1–1	Kuala Lumpur, Malaysia	International Friendly (1993 Merdeka Tournament)
8 April 1993	Japan	L	0–1	Kobe, Japan	1994 FIFA World Cup qualification
11 April 1993	Sri Lanka	W	1–0	Kobe, Japan	1994 FIFA World Cup qualification
13 April 1993	United Arab Emirates	L	0–1	Tokyo, Japan	1994 FIFA World Cup qualification
18 April 1993	Bangladesh	W	4–1	Tokyo, Japan	1994 FIFA World Cup qualification
28 April 1993	Japan	L	0–1	Dubai, United Arab Emirates	1994 FIFA World Cup qualification
30 April 1993	United Arab Emirates	L	1–2	Al Ain, United Arab Emirates	1994 FIFA World Cup qualification
3 May 1993	Sri Lanka	W	3–0	Dubai, United Arab Emirates	1994 FIFA World Cup qualification
5 May 1993	Bangladesh	W	4–1	Dubai, United Arab Emirates	1994 FIFA World Cup qualification
7 June 1993	Myanmar	W	2–0	Kallang, Singapore	1993 Southeast Asian Games – Group A
11 June 1993	Brunei	W	5–2	Kallang, Singapore	1993 Southeast Asian Games – Group A
13 June 1993	Laos	W	4–1	Kallang, Singapore	1993 Southeast Asian Games – Group A
15 June 1993	Malaysia	W	2–0	Kallang, Singapore	1993 Southeast Asian Games – Group A
17 June 1993	Indonesia	W	1–0	Kallang, Singapore	1993 Southeast Asian Games– Semifinals
20 June 1993	Myanmar	W	4–3	Kallang, Singapore	1993 Southeast Asian Games – Final
17 September 1993	Saudi Arabia	L	0–4	Dammam, Saudi Arabia	International Friendly
20 September 1993	Saudi Arabia	L	0–3	Dammam, Saudi Arabia	International Friendly
12 December 1993	Cambodia	W	8–0	Bangkok, Thailand	International Friendly

== 1994 ==
Date	Opponent	Result	Score	Venue	Competition
3 October 1994	Hong Kong	L	1–2	Hiroshima, Japan	1994 Asian Games – Group B
5 October 1994	Saudi Arabia	L	2–4	Hiroshima, Japan	1994 Asian Games – Group B
7 October 1994	Uzbekistan	L	4–5	Hiroshima, Japan	1994 Asian Games – Group B
9 October 1994	Malaysia	D	1–1	Hiroshima, Japan	1994 Asian Games – Group B

== 1995 ==
Date	Opponent	Result	Score	Venue	Competition
10 March 1995	India	W	5–0	Calcutta, India	International Friendly (1995 Nehru Cup)
14 March 1995	Iraq	L	1–3	Calcutta, India	International Friendly (1995 Nehru Cup)
4 December 1995	Indonesia	W	2–1	Chiang Mai, Thailand	1995 Southeast Asian Games – Group A
6 December 1995	Malaysia	D	0–0	Chiang Mai, Thailand	1995 Southeast Asian Games – Group A
10 December 1995	Vietnam	W	3–1	Chiang Mai, Thailand	1995 Southeast Asian Games – Group A
12 December 1995	Cambodia	W	9–0	Chiang Mai, Thailand	1995 Southeast Asian Games – Group A
14 December 1995	Singapore	W	1–0	Chiang Mai, Thailand	1995 Southeast Asian Games – Semifinals
16 December 1995	Vietnam	W	4–0	Chiang Mai, Thailand	1995 Southeast Asian Games – Final

== 1996 ==
Date	Opponent	Result	Score	Venue	Competition
9 February 1996	Finland	W	1–0	Bangkok, Thailand	International Friendly (1996 King's Cup)
16 February 1996	Finland	W	5–2	Bangkok, Thailand	International Friendly (1996 King's Cup)
27 June 1996	Maldives	W	8–0	Bangkok, Thailand	1996 AFC Asian Cup qualification
29 June 1996	Myanmar	W	5–1	Bangkok, Thailand	1996 AFC Asian Cup qualification
1 July 1996	Singapore	D	1–1	Bangkok, Thailand	1996 AFC Asian Cup qualification
4 July 1996	Maldives	W	8–0	Kallang, Singapore	1996 AFC Asian Cup qualification
7 July 1996	Myanmar	W	7–1	Kallang, Singapore	1996 AFC Asian Cup qualification
9 July 1996	Singapore	D	2–2	Kallang, Singapore	1996 AFC Asian Cup qualification
2 September 1996	Philippines	W	5–0	Kallang, Singapore	1996 AFF Championship – Group B
6 September 1996	Brunei	W	6–0	Kallang, Singapore	1996 AFF Championship – Group B
8 September 1996	Malaysia	D	1–1	Kallang, Singapore	1996 AFF Championship – Group B
10 September 1996	Singapore	W	1–0	Kallang, Singapore	1996 AFF Championship – Group B
13 September 1996	Vietnam	W	4–2	Kallang, Singapore	1996 AFF Championship – Semifinals
15 September 1996	Malaysia	W	1–0	Kallang, Singapore	1996 AFF Championship – Final
8 November 1996	Bulgaria	L	0–4	Bangkok, Thailand	International Friendly
5 December 1996	Saudi Arabia	L	0–6	Dubai, United Arab Emirates	1996 AFC Asian Cup – Group B
9 December 1996	Iran	L	1–3	Dubai, United Arab Emirates	1996 AFC Asian Cup – Group B
11 December 1996	Iraq	L	1–4	Dubai, United Arab Emirates	1996 AFC Asian Cup – Group B

== 1997 ==
Date	Opponent	Result	Score	Venue	Competition
9 February 1997	Japan	D	1–1	Bangkok, Thailand	International Friendly (1997 King's Cup)
11 February 1997	Sweden	D	0–0	Bangkok, Thailand	International Friendly (1997 King's Cup)
16 February 1997	Sweden	L	1–3	Bangkok, Thailand	International Friendly (1997 King's Cup)
2 March 1997	South Korea	L	1–3	Bangkok, Thailand	1998 FIFA World Cup qualification
9 March 1997	Hong Kong	W	2–0	Bangkok, Thailand	1998 FIFA World Cup qualification
15 March 1997	Japan	W	3–1	Bangkok, Thailand	International Friendly
30 March 1997	Hong Kong	L	2–3	Wan Chai, Hong Kong	1998 FIFA World Cup qualification
21 May 1997	Northern Ireland	D	0–0	Bangkok, Thailand	International Friendly
1 June 1997	South Korea	D	0–0	Seoul, South Korea	1998 FIFA World Cup qualification
September 1997	Vietnam	W	3–0	Bangkok, Thailand	International Friendly
6 October 1997	Myanmar	W	2–1	Jakarta, Indonesia	1997 Southeast Asian Games – Group B
8 October 1997	Brunei	W	6–0	Jakarta, Indonesia	1997 Southeast Asian Games – Group B
12 October 1997	Cambodia	W	4–0	Jakarta, Indonesia	1997 Southeast Asian Games – Group B
14 October 1997	Singapore	D	0–0	Jakarta, Indonesia	1997 Southeast Asian Games – Group B
16 October 1997	Vietnam	W	2–1	Jakarta, Indonesia	1997 Southeast Asian Games – Semifinals
18 October 1997	Indonesia	D	1–1(a.e.t.); 4–2(pen.)	Jakarta, Indonesia	1997 Southeast Asian Games – Final

== 1998 ==
Date	Opponent	Result	Score	Venue	Competition
25 January 1998	Egypt	D	1–1	Bangkok, Thailand	International Friendly (1998 King's Cup)
29 January 1998	South Korea	L	0–2	Bangkok, Thailand	International Friendly (1998 King's Cup)
22 March 1998	Kazakhstan	W	1–0	Bangkok, Thailand	International Friendly
26 March 1998	Kazakhstan	W	1–0	Bangkok, Thailand	International Friendly
27 August 1998	Myanmar	D	1–1	Ho Chi Minh City, Vietnam	1998 AFF Championship – Group A
29 August 1998	Philippines	W	3–1	Ho Chi Minh City, Vietnam	1998 AFF Championship – Group A
31 August 1998	Indonesia	W	3–2	Ho Chi Minh City, Vietnam	1998 AFF Championship – Group A
3 September 1998	Vietnam	L	0–3	Hanoi, Vietnam	1998 AFF Championship – Semifinals
3 September 1998	Indonesia	D	3–3(a.e.t.); 4–5(pen.)	Ho Chi Minh City, Vietnam	1998 AFF Championship – Third place
21 November 1998	Turkmenistan	D	3–3	Bangkok, Thailand	International Friendly
2 December 1998	Hong Kong	W	5–0	Bangkok, Thailand	1998 Asian Games – Preliminary round Group F
4 December 1998	Oman	W	2–0	Bangkok, Thailand	1998 Asian Games – Preliminary round Group F
8 December 1998	Kazakhstan	D	1–1	Bangkok, Thailand	1998 Asian Games – Second round Group 4
10 December 1998	Lebanon	W	1–0	Bangkok, Thailand	1998 Asian Games – Second round Group 4
12 December 1998	Qatar	L	1–2	Bangkok, Thailand	1998 Asian Games – Second round Group 4
14 December 1998	South Korea	W	2–1(a.e.t.)	Bangkok, Thailand	1998 Asian Games – Quarterfinals
16 December 1998	Kuwait	L	0–3	Bangkok, Thailand	1998 Asian Games – Semifinals
19 December 1998	China	L	0–3	Songkhla, Thailand	1998 Asian Games – Third place

== 1999 ==
Date	Opponent	Result	Score	Venue	Competition
16 June 1999	New Zealand	D	2–2; 4–3(pen.)	Bangkok, Thailand	International Friendly (Four Nations' Cup 1999)
30 July 1999	Philippines	W	9–0	Bandar Seri Begawan, Brunei	1999 Southeast Asian Games – Group A
1 August 1999	Laos	W	4–1	Bandar Seri Begawan, Brunei	1999 Southeast Asian Games – Group A
5 August 1999	Vietnam	D	0–0	Bandar Seri Begawan, Brunei	1999 Southeast Asian Games – Group A
8 August 1999	Myanmar	W	7–0	Bandar Seri Begawan, Brunei	1999 Southeast Asian Games – Group A
12 August 1999	Singapore	W	2–0	Bandar Seri Begawan, Brunei	1999 Southeast Asian Games – Semifinals
14 August 1999	Vietnam	W	2–0	Bandar Seri Begawan, Brunei	1999 Southeast Asian Games – Final
