= 1961 in Thailand =

- Decades: 1940s; 1950s; 1960s; 1970s; 1980s
- See also: Other events of 1961; Timeline of Thai history

The year 1961 was the 180th year of the Rattanakosin Kingdom of Thailand. It was the 16th year in the reign of King Bhumibol Adulyadej (Rama IX), and is reckoned as year 2504 in the Buddhist Era.

== Incumbents ==
- King: Bhumibol Adulyadej
- Crown Prince: (vacant)
- Prime Minister: Sarit Thanarat
- Supreme Patriarch: Ariyavongsagatanana III

== Events ==
=== April ===
An advance party of the 6010th Tactical Group, USAF, arrived at Don Muang at the request of the Royal Thai government to establish an aircraft warning system. Six F-100s from the 510TFS/405FW based at Clark Air Base were deployed to Don Muang in operation "Bell Tone".

=== November ===
Four RF-101C reconnaissance aircraft of the 45th Tactical Reconnaissance Squadron stationed at Misawa AB, Japan, and their photo lab arrived at Don Muang under "Operation Able Marble". The RF-101s were sent to assist RTAF RT-33 aircraft in performing aerial reconnaissance flights over Laos. Detachment 10, 13th Air Force was established to support USAF operations.

== Births ==
- Chuwit Kamolvisit – politician, one-time massage parlor owner
- Sudarat Keyuraphan – politician, served as the Minister of Agriculture and Cooperatives
- Apirak Kosayodhin – former business executive and former governor of Bangkok
- Jira Maligool – film director, screenwriter and producer
- Noppadon Pattama – politician, Foreign Minister of Thailand 2008
- Panna Rittikrai – martial arts action choreographer, film director, screenwriter and actor
- Pongpat Wachirabunjong – singer, actor and film directo

== See also ==
- List of Thai films#1960s
