= 1994 in Thailand =

- Decades: 1970s; 1980s; 1990s; 2000s; 2010s
- See also: Other events of 1994; Timeline of Thai history

The year 1994 was the 213th year of the Rattanakosin Kingdom of Thailand. It was the 49th year of the reign of King Bhumibol Adulyadej (Rama IX) and is reckoned as the year 2537 in the Buddhist Era.

== Incumbents ==
- King: Bhumibol Adulyadej
- Crown Prince: Vajiralongkorn
- Prime Minister: Chuan Leekpai
- Supreme Patriarch: Nyanasamvara Suvaddhana

== Births ==
- 10 September – Saemapetch Fairtex, Muay Thai kickboxer

== See also ==
- 1994 in Thai television
- List of Thai films of 1994
