= 1964 in Thailand =

- Decades: 1940s; 1950s; 1960s; 1970s; 1980s
- See also: Other events of 1964; Timeline of Thai history

The year 1964 was the 183rd year of the Rattanakosin Kingdom of Thailand. It was the 19th year in the reign of King Bhumibol Adulyadej (Rama IX), and is reckoned as year 2507 in the Buddhist Era.

== Incumbents ==
- King: Bhumibol Adulyadej
- Crown Prince: (vacant)
- Prime Minister: Thanom Kittikachorn
- Supreme Patriarch: Ariyavongsagatanana IV
