= Paramanuchitchinorot =

7th Supreme Patriarch of Thai Buddhism and Thai Prince

Somdet Phra Maha Samana Chao Kromma Phra Paramanuchitchinorot
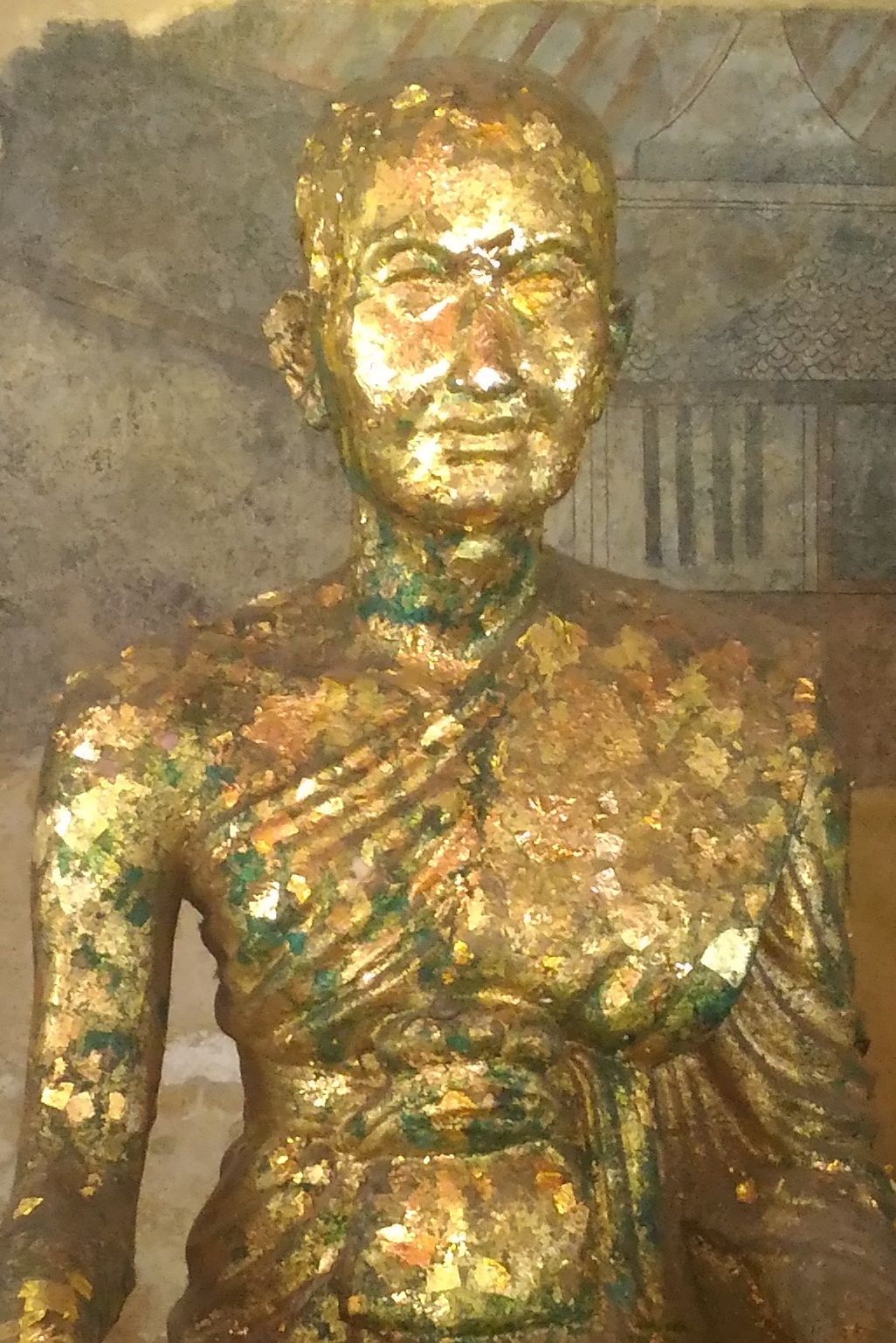
- Statue of Kromma Phra Paramanuchitchinorot at Wat Pho

Supreme Patriarch of Siam
- In office 1851 – 9 December 1853

Personal life
- Born: Prince Wasukri; 11 December 1790 Grand Palace, Bangkok, Siam
- Died: 9 December 1853 (aged 63) Wat Pho, Bangkok, Siam

Religious life
- Religion: Buddhism
- School: Theravada
- Dharma name: Suvaṇṇaraṃsi

Senior posting
- Predecessor: Ariyavangsayana (Nag)
- Successor: Pavares Variyalongkorn

Paramanuchitchinorot (Thai: ปรมานุชิตชิโนรส, RTGS: Paramanuchitchinorot or Poramanuchitchinorot; also spelt Paramanujita Jinorasa, Paramanujit Jinoros, etc.; 11 December 1790 – 9 December 1853) was a Buddhist writer and a prince of the Chakri dynasty. One of his well-known epic poems is Lilit Taleng Phai. In 1851 he was appointed the Supreme Patriarch of the Rattanakosin kingdom and remained in that position until his death.

== Biography ==
Paramanuchitchinorot was the 28th son of Rama I, born to Chao Chom Manda Chui (จุ้ย; later elevated to the title Thao Songkandan) on 11 December 1790 (B.E. 2333). His royal title at birth was Prince Wasukri (วาสุกรี).

He was ordained as a novice monk at the age of 12 in 1802 (B.E. 2345), and later, upon full ordination as a bhikkhu, received the Pali monastic name Suvannaraṃsi. He took residence at Wat Phra Chetuphon Vimolmangklararm (Wat Pho), where he studied Thai literature, Pali, and other subjects under Somdet Phra Phonrat of Wat Phra Chetuphon. He became highly accomplished in both worldly and spiritual knowledge, authoring a large number of literary and religious works.

During the reign of Rama III, the King reorganized the monasteries within the Bangkok area into one administrative division called Khana Klang (Central Monastic Order) and elevated Krom Muen Nuchit Chinoros to a rank equivalent to a Deputy Supreme Patriarch, appointing him as head of the Central Order.

Under Rama IV, he was elevated from Krom Muen Nuchit Chinoros to the title:

Somdet Phra Borommawong Thoe Krom Somdet Phra Paramanuchit Chinoros Srisukotkhattiyawong Boromphongsathibodi Chakkri Borommanat Pathom Phanthum Maharachawarangkul Paramenthararendrasuri Sammana Bhisakkarodom Satharn Ariyasamsilacharn Phiset Mahawimon Mongkol Thamma Chedi Yuttamutawadi Suwiramanun Adulya Khun Khonathan Maholanar Metta Abhithaya Srai Traipitak Kalakoson Benjapadon Sewetchat Siriratnopalakkana Maha Samanuttama Phisekaphisit Phromuk Kritsana Samanasakthamrong Mahasongkhaparinayok Phutthasasanadilok Lokuttama Mahabandit Sunthon Wijit Patiphan Waiyatti Nyana Mahakarawi Phutthathi Sirirattanatray Khunaraks Eka Akkhara Maha Anagariyarat Sayamathilok Patipatthaputthabhorisatyanet Samanakhanintrathibet Sakonphutthachakkroprakarnkit Srisuthiprakarn Mahapamok Prathan Warodom Borommanat Bophit.

(Later, during the reign of Rama VI, the prefix was changed from Krom Somdet Phra to Krom Phra according to the royal hierarchy of the departmental princes.)

He was conferred the rank of Supreme Ecclesiastical Head (Mahasangkha Parinayok) throughout the kingdom, and a royal ordination ceremony, the Maha Samanuttamabhisek, was held at Wat Phra Chetuphon Vimolmangklararm. This ceremony included both Buddhist and Brahmanical rituals, resembling the royal coronation ceremony — marking the first such event in the history of the Thai Sangha.

After his passing, the position of Supreme Patriarch remained vacant throughout the reign of King Mongkut (Rama IV), as no senior monk possessed the necessary qualifications according to traditional royal criteria. By ancient custom, only monks of exceptional virtue — those serving as royal preceptors or senior preceptors (upajjhaya) older than the reigning monarch — were eligible for appointment as Supreme Patriarch or Somdet Phra Rajakhana.

Although the Supreme Patriarchate was vacant, the governance of the Sangha continued smoothly. Traditionally, the monarch held supreme responsibility over ecclesiastical administration, delegating authority to royal or noble officials in the position of Chao Krom Sangkhakari (Director of Sangha Affairs). The Supreme Patriarch served as a venerated figurehead, not a direct administrator. This system was later changed during the reign of Rama VI.

Subsequently, King Vajiravudh observed that the royal family members who served as heads of the Sangha had previously been titled according to their royal rank, not their ecclesiastical status — that is, they were not called Somdet Phra Ariyavongsagatayana (Supreme Patriarch). To correctly reflect their dual royal and monastic standing, he ordered that such royal monks should bear the prefix Somdet Phra Maha Samana Chao. Thus, the title was officially changed to Somdet Phra Maha Samana Chao Krom Phra Paramanuchit Chinoros.

== Legacy ==
Following his death, no new Supreme Patriarch was appointed during the remainder of King Rama IV’s reign, as no monk was deemed sufficiently qualified according to royal and traditional standards—those requiring the candidate to be a preceptor, a teacher of the King, or a senior monk older than the King.

Despite the vacancy, the Sangha (monastic community) remained well-governed under the oversight of royal officials (chao krom sanghakari), who handled ecclesiastical affairs on behalf of the monarch.

In 1921 (B.E. 2464), King Rama VI issued a royal decree changing how titles were assigned to royal monks serving as Supreme Patriarchs. Previously, they retained their princely styles; however, Rama VI determined that such monks should also bear a formal ecclesiastical title. Therefore, Prince Paramanuchitchinorot was posthumously renamed:

Somdet Phra Maha Samana Chao Krom Phra Paramanuchitchinorot (สมเด็จพระมหาสมณเจ้า กรมพระปรมานุชิตชิโนรส)

This marked the first instance in Thai history where the Supreme Patriarch title ("Somdet Phra Ariyavongsagatayana") was officially combined with a princely style to reflect both religious and royal stature.

His contributions to Thai Buddhism, particularly in the realms of scripture, language, and poetry, remain celebrated to this day.

== Accomplishments ==
His Holiness Somdej Phra Maha Samana Chao Krom Phra Paramanuchitchinorot had many talents. In literature, he wrote the Chan Mata Phriti and Wan Phriti, the Klong Klon Bot, and Kham Kritsadee, etc. He also wrote many poems, all of which are valuable and have been the gems of Thai literature throughout.

In terms of religious literature, he wrote the Pathom Somphothikatha, the Maha Vessantara Jataka, or the Mahachat, which are considered masterpieces of Buddhist literature during the Rattanakosin period. He also wrote many other stories, such as the Lilit Talaeng Phai, the Royal Chronicles of His Holiness Somdej Phra Paramanuchitchinorot, the Sermon of the Chronicles of Ayutthaya, the Lilit Krabuan Payu Yatra, the Kathin Sathon Marak, and the Chonlamak, etc.

In terms of Buddhist art, He designed various Buddha statues for King Nangklao. He selected 37 postures from the life of the Buddha, starting from the posture of asceticism to the posture of subduing Mara. These Buddha statues

In 1990, the United Nations Educational, Scientific and Cultural Organization (UNESCO) announced the recognition of His Holiness the Supreme Patriarch Prince Paramanuchitchinorot was awarded the World Cultural Outstanding Person of the Year in 1990. He is the first monk to receive this honor.

=== His writings ===
- Saraphasit Khamchan
- Samutkhot Khamchan, late part
- Kritsana Son Nong Khamchan
- Dussadee Sangwey Lullaby for Female Elephant
- Kap Khap Mai Lullaby for Female Elephant
- Matraphruti Chan
- Wanaphruti Chan
- Lilit Taleng Phai
- Lilit Khruen Payu Yatra Phra Kathin Sathalamak and Chonlamak
- Klong Yo Phrakiat Phra Bat Somdet Phra Nangklao Chao Yu Hua when he renovated Wat Phra Chetuphon
- Kwannakhon Raksin rhyme
- Mahachat Sermon 11 sections
- Various Buddhist scriptures
- Pathamasambodhi
- Sermons of the Ayutthaya Chronicles
- Lilit Chakkratipani (a textbook on astrology)
- Long Songs of the Lord
- Kham Ritsati (a book on vocabulary)
- Various miscellaneous poems, such as the Rishi Datton poem, the different language poem
- Chan Sangwey Klong Vinicchai Pheri
- Kuruthammachataka, etc.

Buddhist titles
Preceded by Ariyavongsanana	Supreme Patriarch of Thailand; 1851–1853	Succeeded by Pavares Variyalongkorn
