= Ariyavangsagatayana (Sa Pussadeva) =

9th Supreme Patriarch of Thai Buddhism

His Holiness Somdet Phra Ariyavamsagatañāṇa (Sa Pussadeva) Somdet Phra Sangharaja
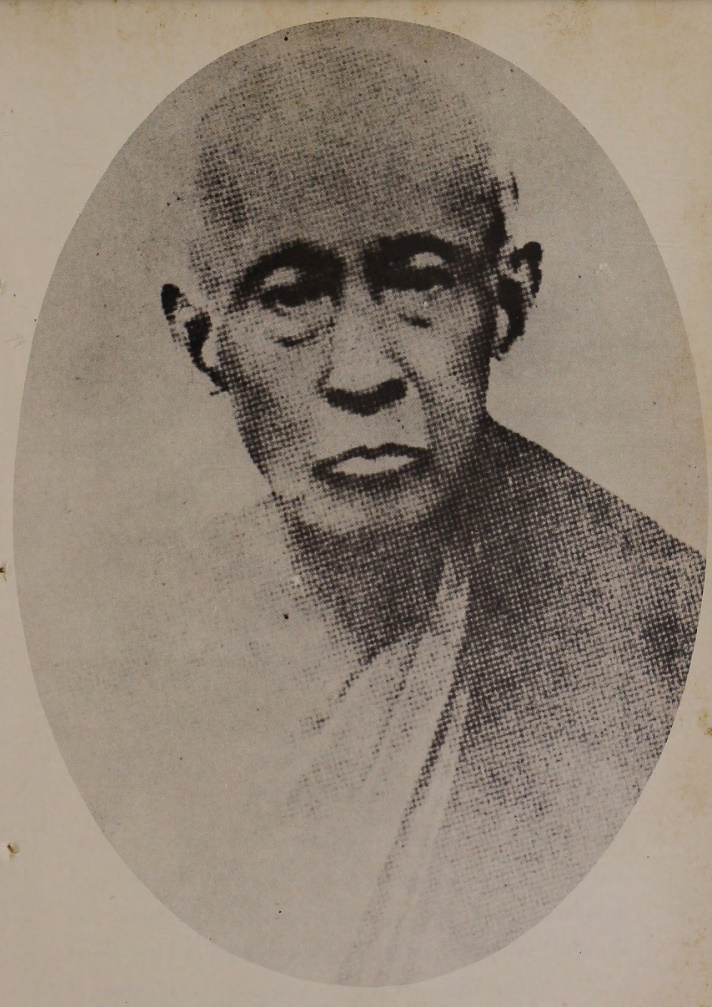

Supreme Patriarch of Siam
- In office 29 November 1893 – 11 January 1900

Personal life
- Born: Sa; August 19, 1812 Nonthaburi, Thailand
- Died: January 11, 1899 (aged 85) Bangkok, Thailand

Religious life
- Religion: Buddhism
- School: Theravada, Dhammayuttika Nikaya
- Dharma name: Pussadevo

Senior posting
- Predecessor: Pavares Variyalongkorn
- Successor: Vajirananavarorasa

Somdet Phra Ariyawongsakhatayan Somdet Phra Sangharaja (also known as Ariyavangsagatayana II; birth name Sa, monastic title Pussadevo) was the 9th Supreme Patriarch of Thailand (Sangharaja Sakolmahasanghaparinayok) during the Rattanakosin era.

He was born in 1812 in Nonthaburi Province and became widely known as the most famous Naga Luang novice in the Rattanakosin Kingdom, being the first novice in the kingdom’s history to pass the Parian Dhamma examination with all nine grades, earning him the title “Genius Novice of Rattanakosin.”

Before his appointment as Supreme Patriarch, he served as abbot of Wat Ratchapradit and resided at Wat Ratchaburana Sata Mahasima Ram Ratchaworawihan during the reign of King Chulalongkorn (Rama V). He succeeded Pavares Variyalongkorn as Supreme Patriarch in 1893 (B.E. 2436) and held the position until his death in 1899 (B.E. 2442) at the age of 87. He was succeeded by Vajirananavarorasa.

== Biography ==
Somdet Phra Ariyawongsakhatayan (Sa Pussadevo) was a native of Bang Phai Subdistrict, Nonthaburi Province, born during the reign of King Rama II on Thursday, the 8th waning moon of the 9th lunar month, Year of the Rooster, Chulasakarat 1175, corresponding to 19 August 1813 (B.E. 2356). His family originally lived in Bang Choeng Kran, Ratchaburi Province. His father, Chan, was once ordained and well-versed in the Milindapañha and Mālāyasutra, earning the nickname “Chan Milindamalai.” His mother’s name was Suk. He had four siblings—Uap, Chang, Sa, Sang, and Im. His younger brother, Sang, was ordained at Wat Bowonniwet Vihara and later held the title Phra Samutmuni, but subsequently disrobed. It is unknown what surname Somdet Phra Ariyawongsakhatayan (Sa) used before ordination. During his lay life, he had a wife and descendants who adopted the surnames “Pussadet” and “Pussadevo,” families that still exist in Nonthaburi Province today.

=== Education ===
He was ordained as a novice during the reign of Rama III. Initially residing at Wat Mai in Khlong Bang Khun Thian, Ban Mo, Bang Tanawsi, Nonthaburi (now Wat Nakhon In), he later moved to Wat Sangwet Witsayaram and then to the palace of the Vice King to study Pali with Teacher On and his own father, who was also an instructor there. At age 14, he took the Pali translation examination for the first time and translated two sections, though not enough to earn the “Parian” title, but was informally called “Parian Wang Na” (“Scholar of the Front Palace”).

Later, he became a disciple of Rama IV while the latter was still a monk at Wat Samorai (now Wat Ratchathiwas), famed for his Pali expertise. Under his tutelage, Novice Sa mastered the language and, at only 18, became the first novice in Rattanakosin to pass all nine grades of the Parian Dhamma examination. His oral examination (translation recited directly before judges) was so extraordinary that he became widely known across the capital. King Rama III later appointed him as the first “Naga Luang” (royal novice) in the Parian Dhamma lineage.

=== First Ordination and Disrobing ===
He was ordained at Wat Ratchathiwas in 1833 (B.E. 2376) under Phra Sumetmuni (Sai Puttawongso), a Mon elder, as preceptor, with King Mongkut as instructor, receiving the ordination name “Pusso.” Contrary to some scholars’ belief, he did not pass the 9th grade exam at Wat Bowonniwet, but later moved there in 1836 after ordination, following Phra Wachirayan. Thus, he became the first royal novice-scholar to reside at Wat Bowonniwet, though he had earned his 9th grade before joining this monastery. In 1839 (B.E. 2382), King Rama III conferred upon him the ecclesiastical title Phra Amornmoli. He later disrobed for a period.

=== Second Ordination — “The 18-Grade Patriarch” ===
When King Mongkut ascended the throne, he invited Nai Sa to reordain. He accepted, and in 1851 (B.E. 2394) at age 39, was reordained at Wat Bowonniwet with Prince Bowonrangsisuriyaporn (later Pavares Variyalongkorn) as preceptor, receiving the new monastic title Pussadevo. He reportedly re-sat the Parian Dhamma exams and again passed all nine grades—earning the nickname “18-Grade Patriarch.” In 1858 (B.E. 2401), he was promoted to Phra Sasanasopon with royal stipend equivalent to the “Deva” class of ecclesiastical title, though officially still at the “Common” rank. He was colloquially called “Chao Khun Sa.”

In 1865 (B.E. 2408), King Mongkut completed Wat Ratchaburana Sata Mahasima Ram—the first newly established Dhammayuttika Nikaya temple—and appointed Phra Sasanasopon (Sa Pussadevo) as abbot, bringing with him 20 monks from Wat Bowonniwet. In 1872 (B.E. 2415), he was promoted to Phra Dhammaworodom, assistant Supreme Ecclesiastical head, and later, in 1879 (B.E. 2422), to Somdet Phra Phutthaghosa Chariya, Great Ecclesiastical Chief of the Northern Division.

=== Supreme Patriarch ===
In 1891 (B.E. 2434), he was elevated to Somdet Phra Ariyawongsakhatayan and installed as Supreme Patriarch of Thailand in 1893 (B.E. 2436), holding the position for six years. He retained his previous royal inscription but received a new royal endorsement, expanding his authority to 16 subordinate positions (normally 15).

== Works ==
He composed numerous Buddhist sermons and treatises, including concise versions of Pathamasambodhi for Vesak, Caturangkasannibat and Ovadapatimokkha for Magha Puja, as well as extensive commentaries for preaching. His works—around 20 translated suttas and 70 sermon volumes—remain in use among monks and novices to this day.

In 1888 (B.E. 2431), under King Chulalongkorn, he co-led the editing and printing of the Tipitaka in Thai script, replacing Khmer palm-leaf manuscripts, resulting in the R.S. 112 Edition of 1,000 sets (39 volumes each), published in 1893.

He also composed the verse inscription on the gable of the Ministry of Defence and designed the national coat of arms under King Rama V.

== Ecclesiastical Ranks ==
- 1839 (B.E. 2382) – Phra Amornmoli
- Later – Disrobed
- 1851 (B.E. 2394) – Reordained as Phra Pussadevo
- 1858 (B.E. 2401) – Phra Sasanasopon
- 1872 (B.E. 2415) – Phra Dhammaworodom
- 1879 (B.E. 2422) – Somdet Phra Phutthaghosa Chariya
- 1891 (B.E. 2434) – Somdet Phra Ariyawongsakhatayan
- 1893 (B.E. 2436) – Installed as Supreme Patriarch of Thailand

== Passing ==
Somdet Phra Ariyawongsakhatayan (Sa Pussadevo) suffered from dysentery beginning December 30, 1898, and died on Thursday, January 11, 1899 (B.E. 2442/2443). The next evening, King Chulalongkorn came from Bang Pa-In Palace to preside over the bathing ceremony. His royal cremation was held jointly with that of Pavares Variyalongkorn at Wat Bowonniwet Vihara on January 6, 1900. The ashes were enshrined at Wat Ratchaburana Sata Mahasima Ram on February 14, 1900. Following his death, King Chulalongkorn did not appoint another Supreme Patriarch for the remaining eleven years of his reign.

Buddhist titles
Preceded by Pavares Variyalongkorn	Supreme Patriarch of Thailand; 1893–1899	Succeeded by Vajirananavarorasa
