= Ariyavangsagatayana (Pun Puṇṇasiri) =

17th Supreme Patriarch of Thai Buddhism

Somdet Phra Ariyavamsagatañāṇa (Pun Puṇṇasiri) Somdet Phra Sangharāja Sakalamahāsaṅghapariṇāyaka
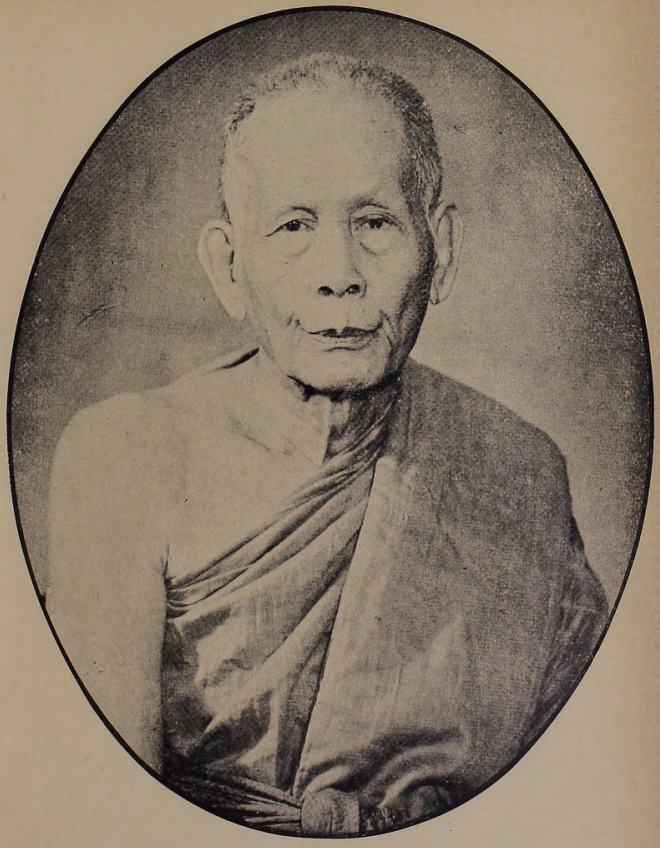

17th Supreme Patriarch of Thailand
- In office 21 July 1972 – 7 December 1973

Personal life
- Born: Pun Sukcharoen; 1896 Song Phi Nong, Suphan Buri, Thailand
- Died: 7 December 1973 (aged 77) Bangkok, Thailand

Religious life
- Religion: Buddhism
- School: Theravada, Maha Nikaya
- Dharma name: Puṇṇasiri

Senior posting
- Predecessor: Ariyavangsagatayana (Chuan Utthayi)
- Successor: Jinavaralongkorn

Somdet Phra Ariyavangsagatayana Somdet Phra Sangharaja, or simply known as Ariyavangsagatayana VII, was briefly the 17th Supreme Patriarch of Thailand (1972–1973, 2515–2516 Thai calendar). He was born in 1896 as Pun Punnasiri in Song Phi Nong District, Suphan Buri Province. He was a member of the Chetupon Temple. He reigned only for 1 year and 4 months. His predecessor was Ariyavangsagatayana, 16th Supreme Patriarch of Thailand and his successor was Jinavajiralongkorn (Vasana Vasano).

Somdejphrasangkharach XVII Hospital, the main hospital of Song Phi Nong District, is named after his title.

Buddhist titles
| Preceded by Ariyavangsagatayana (Chuan Utthayi) | Supreme Patriarch of Thailand; 1972–1973 | Succeeded by Jinavajiralongkorn |
