= Pavares Variyalongkorn =

8th Supreme Patriarch of Thai Buddhism and Thai Prince

Somdet Phra Maha Samana Chao Kromma Phraya Pavares Variyalongkorn
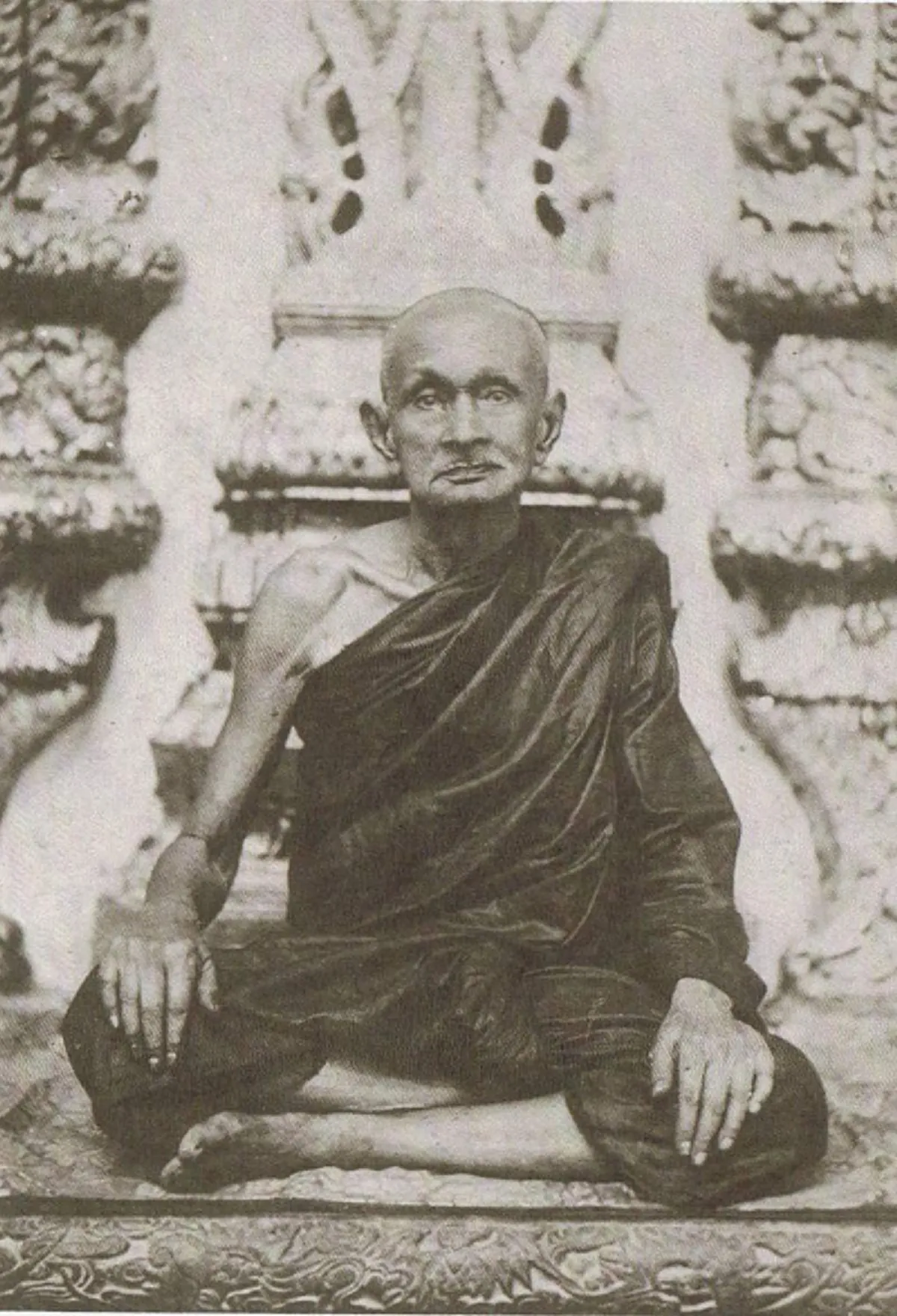

Supreme Patriarch of Siam
- In office December 1891 – 28 September 1892

Personal life
- Born: Prince Rurk; 14 September 1809 Front Palace, Bangkok, Siam
- Died: 28 September 1892 (aged 83) Wat Bowonniwet Vihara, Bangkok, Siam

Religious life
- Religion: Buddhism
- School: Theravada
- Dharma name: Paññāaggo

Senior posting
- Predecessor: Paramanuchitchinorot
- Successor: Ariyavongsagatanana II

Pavares Variyalongkorn (Thai: ปวเรศวริยาลงกรณ์, RTGS: Pawaret Wariyalongkon, etc.; 14 September 1809 – 28 September 1892) was a Buddhist scholar, historian and a prince of the Chakri dynasty. A son of the Viceroy Maha Senanurak and Noi Lek, the prince became a monk in 1830 and was given the dharma name Paññāaggo (Thai: ปญฺญาอคฺโค). In 1851 he succeed Mongkut as the second abbot of Wat Bowonniwet Vihara, upon the latter's accession to the throne as king. In the same year he was elevated in princely rank and received a new name; Krom Muen Bowonrangsisuriphan (Thai: กรมหมื่นบวรรังษีสุริยพันธุ์). In 1873 he was once again elevated in princely rank and became Krom Phra Pavares Variyalongkorn. In 1891 he was appointed Supreme Patriarch by King Chulalongkorn. He remained in this position until his death in 1892.

He kept a daily record of rainfall and significant events (Thai: จดหมายเหตุบัญชีน้ำฝน, lit. 'rainwater ledger chronicle') for 45 years from 1855 to 1890. The compilation took up thirteen folding-book manuscripts. The chronicle is a significant historical record of weather and society during the reigns of King Mongkut and King Chulalongkorn.

Order of precedence
Preceded by Prince Devesara vatcharin	Eldest Royal Member of the Chakri Dynasty; 1873–1892	Succeeded by Princess Nivesn
Buddhist titles
Preceded by Paramanuchitchinorot	Supreme Patriarch of Thailand; 1891–1892	Succeeded by Ariyavangsagatayana (Sa Pussadeva)
