= Ariyavangsagatayana (Chuan Utthayi) =

16th Supreme Patriarch of Thai Buddhism

Somdet Phra Ariyavamsagatañāṇa (Chuan Uṭṭhāyī) Somdet Phra Sangharāja Sakalamahāsaṅghapariṇāyaka
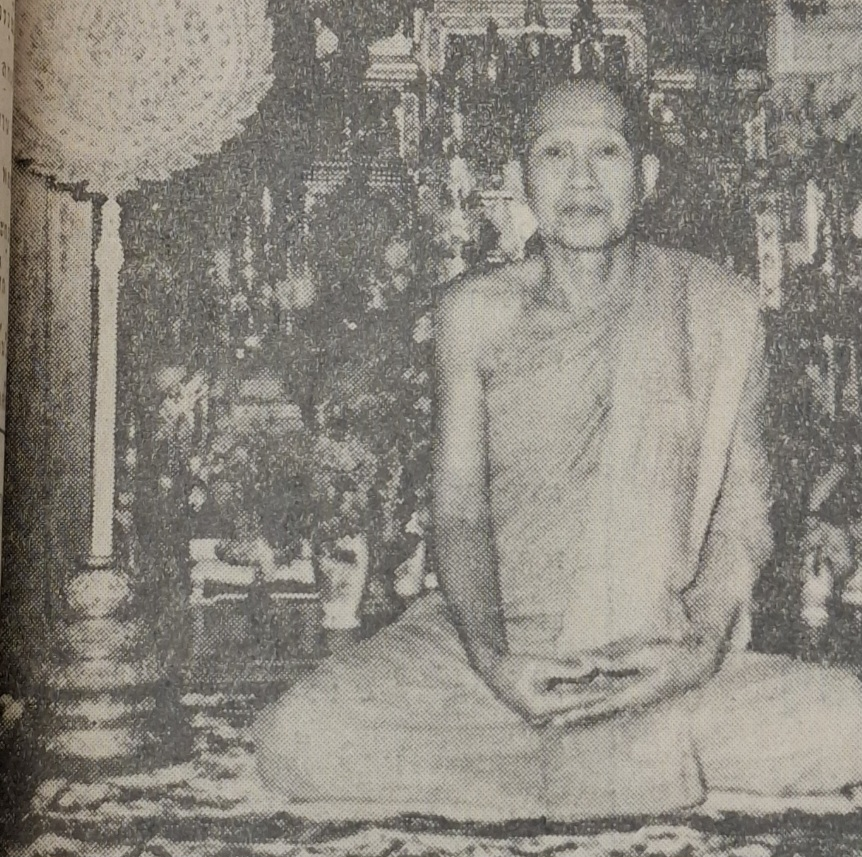

16th Supreme Patriarch of Thailand
- In office 26 November 1965 – 18 December 1971

Personal life
- Born: Chuan Sirisom; 16 January 1897 Ban Pong, Ratchaburi, Siam
- Died: 18 December 1971 (aged 74) Bang Phli, Samut Prakan, Thailand

Religious life
- Religion: Buddhism
- School: Theravada, Dhammayuttika Nikaya
- Dharma name: Uṭṭhāyī

Senior posting
- Predecessor: Ariyavangsagatayana (Yoo Ñāṇodayo)
- Successor: Ariyavangsagatayana (Pun Puṇṇasiri)

Somdet Phra Ariyavangsagatayana, also known as Ariyavangsagatayana VI, was the 16th Somdet Phra Sangharaja 1965–1971 (2508–2514 Thai calendar). He was born in 1897 as Juan Sirisom in Ratchaburi Province. He also served as the abbot of Wat Makut until he died in 1971. His predecessor was Ariyavangsagatayana (Yoo Ñāṇodayo) and his successor was Ariyavangsagatayana (Pun Puṇṇasiri).

Buddhist titles
Preceded by Ariyavangsagatayana (Yoo Ñaṇodayo)	Supreme Patriarch of Thailand; 1965–1971	Succeeded by Ariyavangsagatayana (Pun Puṇṇasiri)
