= Jinavaralongkorn =

18th Supreme Patriarch of Thai Buddhism

Somdet Phra Sangharaja Chao Krommaluang Jinavaralongkorn

18th Supreme Patriarch of Thailand
- In office 1974–1988

Personal life
- Born: Vasana Nilprapha; 2 March 1897 Nakhon Luang, Ayutthaya, Thailand
- Died: 27 August 1988 (aged 91) Bangkok, Thailand

Religious life
- Religion: Buddhism
- School: Theravada, Dhammayuttika Nikaya
- Dharma name: Vasano

Senior posting
- Predecessor: Ariyavangsagatayana (Pun Puṇṇasiri)
- Successor: Vajirañāṇasaṃvara

Somdet Phra Sangharaja Chao Krommaluang Jinavaralongkorn (Vasana Vāsano) (Thai: สมเด็จพระสังฆราชเจ้า กรมหลวงชินวราลงกรณ (วาสน์ วาสโน)), or Ariyavangsagatayana VIII (Vasana Vāsano) was the 18th Supreme Patriarch of Thailand 1973–1988 (Thai Calendar 2517–2531). He was born on 2 March 1897 (2440) within the Ayutthaya province as Vasana Nilprapha (Thai: วาสน์ นิลประภา). His dharma name in Pali was Vasano (Thai: วาสโน). He was a monk of the Wat Ratchabophit. He died in 1988, at age 91, after a reign of 14 years and 2 months.

Buddhist titles
Preceded by Ariyavangsagatayana (Pun Puṇṇasiri)	Supreme Patriarch of Thailand; 1973–1988	Succeeded by Vajirañāṇasaṃvara
