= Jinavara Visuddhidevaryavongse =

11th Supreme Patriarch of Thailand

Somdet Phra Maha Samana Chao Kromma Phra Jinavara Visuddhidevaryavongse
- สมเด็จพระมหาสมณเจ้า กรมพระชินวรวิสุทธิเทวารยวงศ์
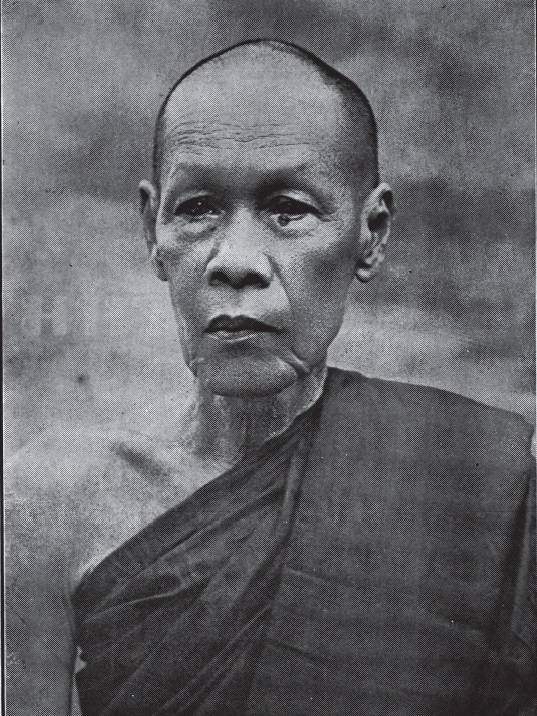
- Jinavara Sirivaddhana

11th Supreme Patriarch of Thailand
- In office 20 August 1921 – 25 August 1937

Personal life
- Born: Prince Bhujong Jombunud; 16 December 1859 Bangkok, Siam
- Died: 25 August 1937 (aged 77) Wat Ratchabophit, Bangkok, Siam

Religious life
- Religion: Buddhism
- School: Theravada, Dhammayuttika Nikaya
- Dharma name: Sirivaḍḍhana

Senior posting
- Predecessor: Vajirananavarorasa
- Successor: Ariyavangsagatayana (Phae Tissadeva)

Somdet Phra Maha Samana Chao Kromma Phra Jinavara Visuddhidevaryavongse (Thai: สมเด็จพระมหาสมณเจ้า กรมพระชินวรวิสุทธิเทวารยวงศ์; Pali: Sirivaḍḍhana Mahāthera; 16 December 1859 – 25 August 1937), born Prince Bhujong Jombunud, was the 11th Supreme Patriarch of Thailand and a senior monk of the Dhammayuttika Nikaya. He served as Supreme Patriarch from 20 August 1921 until his death in 1937. During his lifetime, he was styled Somdet Phra Sangharaja Chao Kromma Luang Jinavara Sirivaddhana, also styled HRH Prince-Patriarch Jinavara. In July 2025, King Vajiralongkorn posthumously elevated his royal and ecclesiastical rank to the title Somdet Phra Maha Samana Chao. During his tenure, he oversaw the Dhammayuttika order, chaired Mahamakut Buddhist College, and supervised the revision and publication of the Siamrat edition of the Pāli Canon.

== Early life and education ==
Jinavara was born on 16 December 1859 as Prince Bhujong Jombunud, the eldest son of Prince Charoenphon Phulsawat, founder of the Jombunud family line, and Mom Pun. He belonged to the Chakri dynasty through the line of King Rama III.

As a child, he studied Thai letters with his grandmother, Chao Chom Manda Samrit. After his tonsure ceremony, King Vajiravudh sent him to study at Raffles School in Singapore for about nine months. He later continued his English studies in Bangkok and studied Khmer script under Phraya Si Sunthon Wohan.

== Ordination and monastic studies ==
In 1873, at the age of 14, he was ordained as a novice at Wat Phra Si Rattana Satsadaram. His preceptor was Pavares Variyalongkorn, and Prince Arun Niphakhunakon acted as the karmavācācariya. After his ordination, he resided at Wat Ratchabophit.

He received full ordination on 29 June 1879 at Wat Phra Si Rattana Satsadaram. His preceptor was Somdet Phra Wannarat (Thap Buddhasiri), while Ariyavangsagatayana (Sa Pussadeva) of Wat Ratchapradit served as karmavācācariya. His Pali dharma name was Sirivaḍḍhana.

As a novice, he studied Pali with Phra Khru Banthon Thammasamothan, Thai with Phraya Owat Worakit, and Sanskrit with Brahmin teachers. After full ordination, he continued his Buddhist scriptural studies under Ariyavangsagatayana while the latter held the rank of Phra Thamwarodom. Jinavara passed the fourth grade of Pali studies in 1882 and the fifth grade in 1887.

== Ecclesiastical career ==
Jinavara became the second abbot of Wat Ratchabophit in 1901, succeeding Prince Arun Niphakhunakon. In 1906, he was elevated as a senior ecclesiastical dignitary with the princely rank of Phra Worawong Thoe Phra Ong Chao.

On 22 January 1910, he was promoted with the title Kromma Muen Chinavorn Sirivaddhana. In 1913, he was appointed deputy head of the Dhammayuttika order.

Following the death of Vajirananavarorasa on 2 August 1921, King Vajiravudh appointed Jinavara as Supreme Patriarch on 20 August 1921. He was the first Supreme Patriarch of the Rattanakosin period to receive the style Somdet Phra Sangharaja Chao. On 20 April 1926, King Prajadhipok promoted him from Kromma Muen to Kromma Luang.

Jinavara held the office of Supreme Patriarch during the reigns of Vajiravudh, Prajadhipok, and Ananda Mahidol. He also succeeded Vajirananavarorasa as head of the Dhammayuttika order and served as chairman of Mahamakut Buddhist College from 1921 until his death.

== Scholarship and religious work ==
=== Siamrat edition of the Tipiṭaka ===
During his tenure as Supreme Patriarch, Jinavara chaired the revision and printing of the Siamrat edition of the Tipiṭaka. King Prajadhipok ordered the project in 1925 in honour of King Vajiravudh. The revision used the 35-volume printed Tipiṭaka of 1893 as its basis and expanded the revised edition to 45 volumes.

In addition to presiding over the revision committee, Jinavara personally revised the Aṅguttara Nikāya portion of the Sutta Piṭaka, amounting to five printed volumes. The Siamrat edition was completed in 1930. After its completion, King Prajadhipok granted ownership of the edition to Mahamakut Buddhist College for use in Buddhist education.

=== Mahamakut Buddhist College and education ===
Jinavara served as chairman of Mahamakut Buddhist College from 1921 until his death. During his chairmanship, he helped establish the Mahamakut Buddhist University Foundation, which was intended to use income from the college's assets to support Pali studies and Buddhist propagation. He became the foundation's first chairman.

The 2025 royal proclamation referred to his work in Buddhist education, the Siamrat Tipiṭaka edition, the Mahamakut Buddhist University Foundation, and the Dhamma studies examination system for laypeople.

Jinavara was also a patron of Wat Rajabopit School. A later account by the Public Relations Department states that the school preserved his initials, ช.ส., as a school emblem and used the Pali motto viriyena dukkhamacceti, translated in Thai as "one overcomes suffering through effort".

=== Writings ===
Jinavara's works included translations and textbooks such as the Abhidhānappadīpikā, a Pali–Thai dictionary, the Mahānipāta Jātaka, Nithan Ton Banyat, and Samanera-sikkha. These works were used in Pali and Buddhist studies by monks, novices, and laypeople.

== Dhamma Studies and wider access to Buddhist education ==
Jinavara considered the study of Buddhist doctrine to be beneficial not only to monks and novices, but also to lay Buddhists. He established the Dhamma Studies curriculum as a lay counterpart to the Nak Tham monastic curriculum. The programme comprised elementary, intermediate, and advanced levels, with its content adapted for lay life by replacing the monastic disciplinary syllabus with instruction on the Five Precepts, the five ennobling virtues, and the Eight Precepts.

The first Dhamma Studies examination was instituted on 24 August 1929. By extending organized instruction and examinations beyond monastic institutions, the system enabled laypeople, including women and young people, to study Buddhist doctrine and receive formal assessment. This broadened access to religious and moral education regardless of gender, age, or social status.

The system expanded throughout Thailand, becoming an established component of Buddhist education for students and the general public. In 2026, the Sangha Supreme Council of Thailand approved a project commemorating the forthcoming centenary of the programme. The council designated Jinavara's work as a significant development in educational expansion and lifelong learning, associating its legacy with educational access, cultural preservation, and peace.

== Personal symbols ==
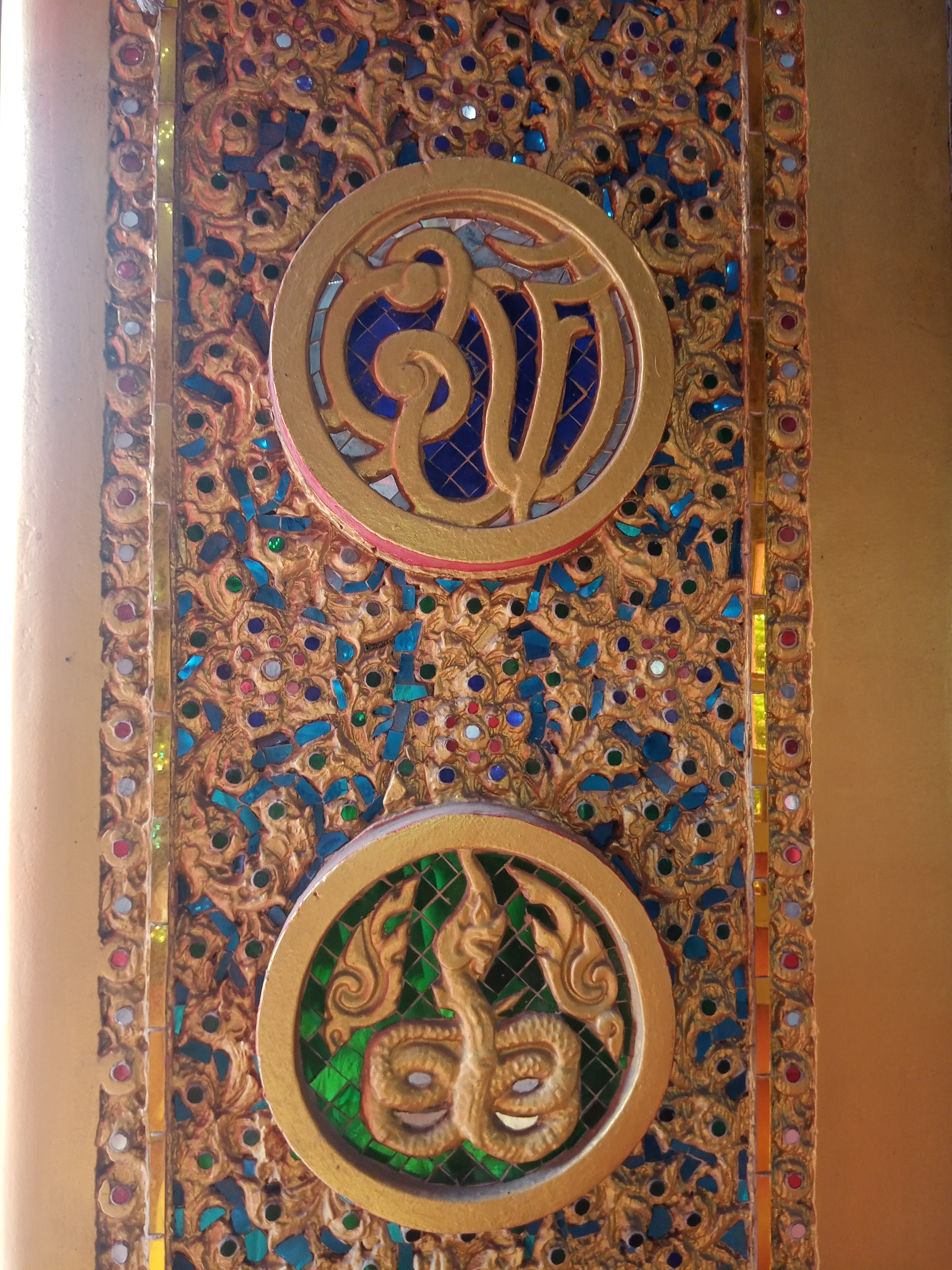
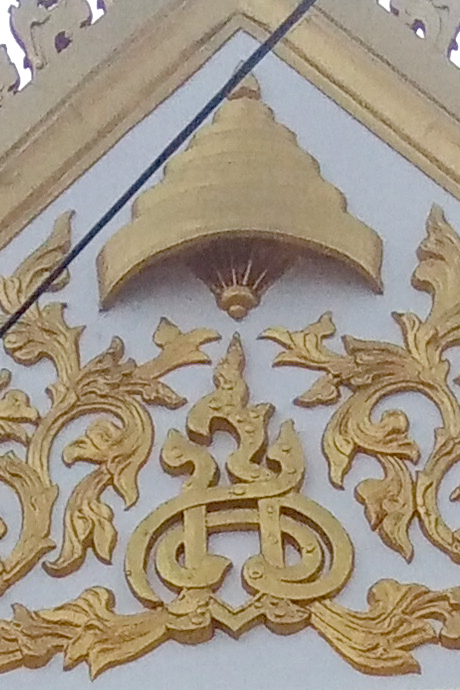
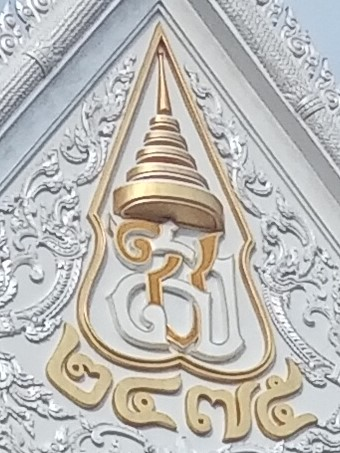
Monograms of Jinavara Sirivaddhana at Wat Jinavararam in Pathum Thani Province.
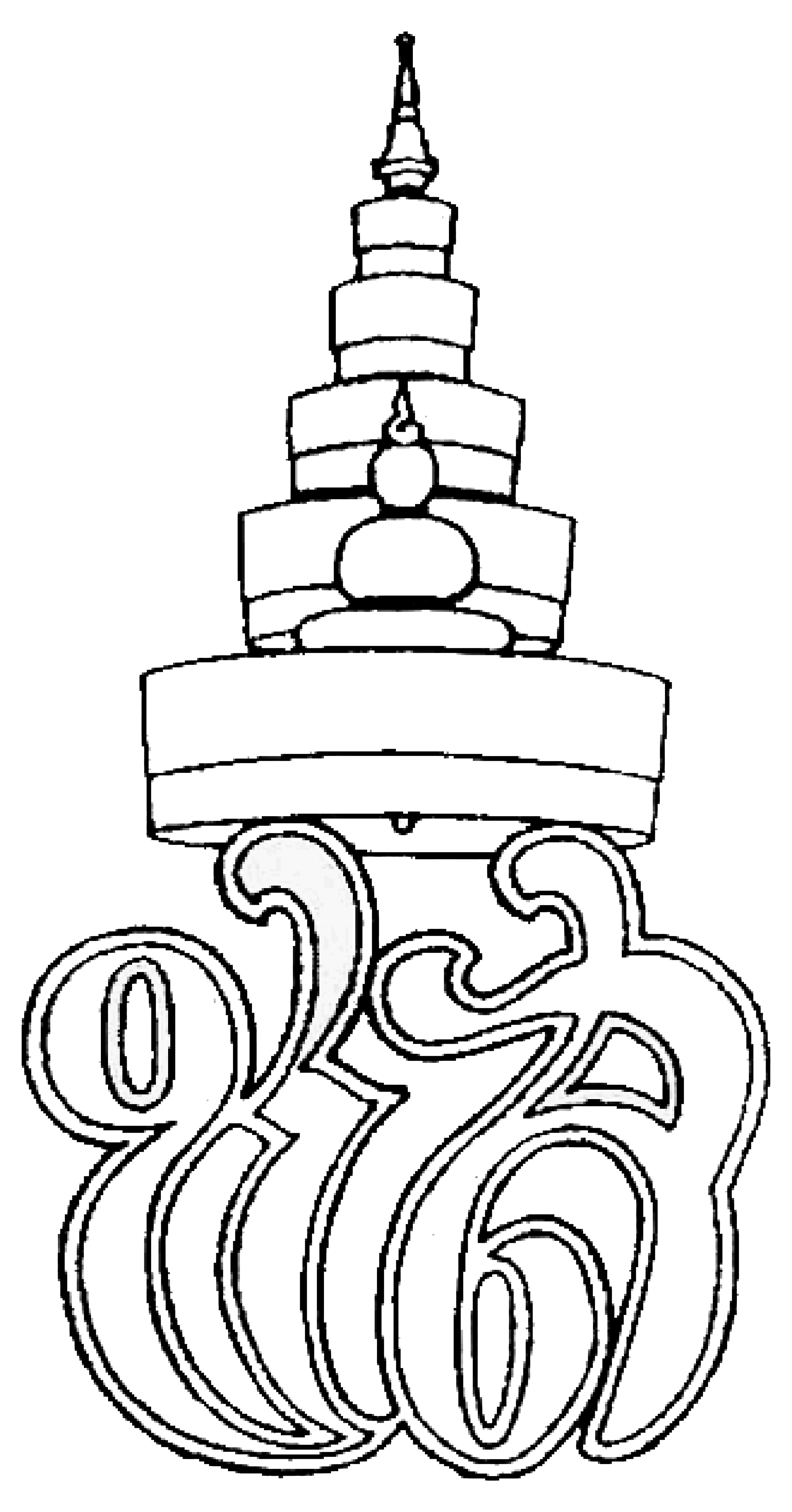
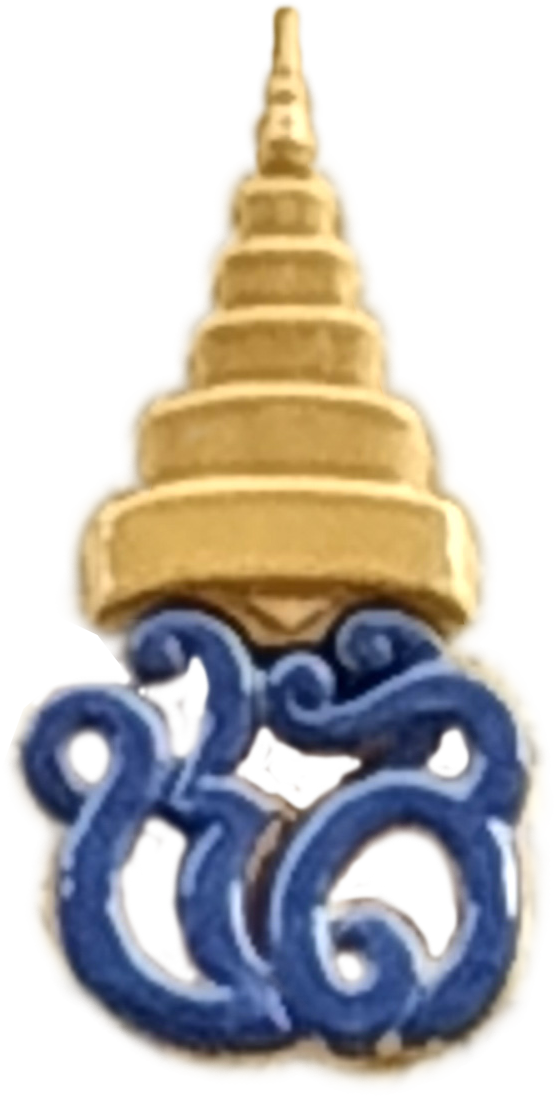
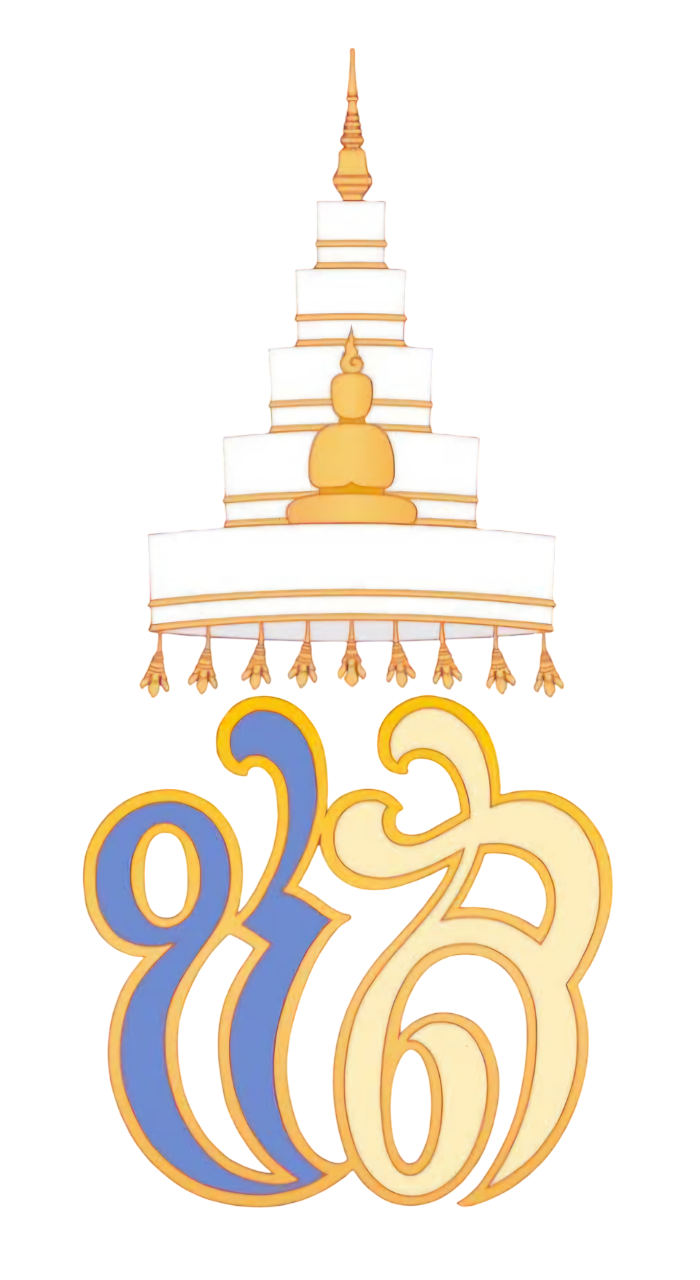
Monograms of Jinavara Sirivaddhana, posthumously designed in 1948 by Prince Narisara Nuvadtivongs and a revised version for his rank as Somdet Phra Maha Samana Chao in 2025.

During his lifetime, Kromma Luang Jinavara Sirivaddhana used several personal emblems based on his Thai initials, ช.ส. (Jinavara Sirivaddhana). Some featured a five-tier yellow umbrella signifying his rank as Somdet Phra Sangharaja Chao. Following his death, Prince Narisara Nuvadtivongs designed a revised version of the initialed, umbrella-topped emblem for the memorial fan distributed at Jinavara's royal cremation.

== Death and cremation ==
Jinavara died at Wat Ratchabophit on 25 August 1937 at the age of 77, after 59 years in the monkhood. His royal cremation was held on 21 February 1938 at Wat Thepsirinthrawat.

== Posthumous elevation ==
On 17 July 2025, King Vajiralongkorn posthumously elevated Jinavara's royal remains in both royal and ecclesiastical rank. The proclamation elevated him from Phrachao Worawong Thoe Kromma Luang Jinavara Sirivaddhana, Somdet Phra Sangharaja Chao to Phrachao Borommawong Thoe Kromma Phra, residing at the rank of Somdet Phra Maha Samana Chao. The short form of the new title was Somdet Phra Maha Samana Chao Kromma Phra Jinavara Visuddhidevaryavongse.

The elevation made him the fourth person of the Rattanakosin period to hold the rank of Somdet Phra Maha Samana Chao. The proclamation also ordered a five-tier white umbrella to be placed over his image at the stupa niche in Wat Ratchabophit as a mark of the rank.

== Legacy ==
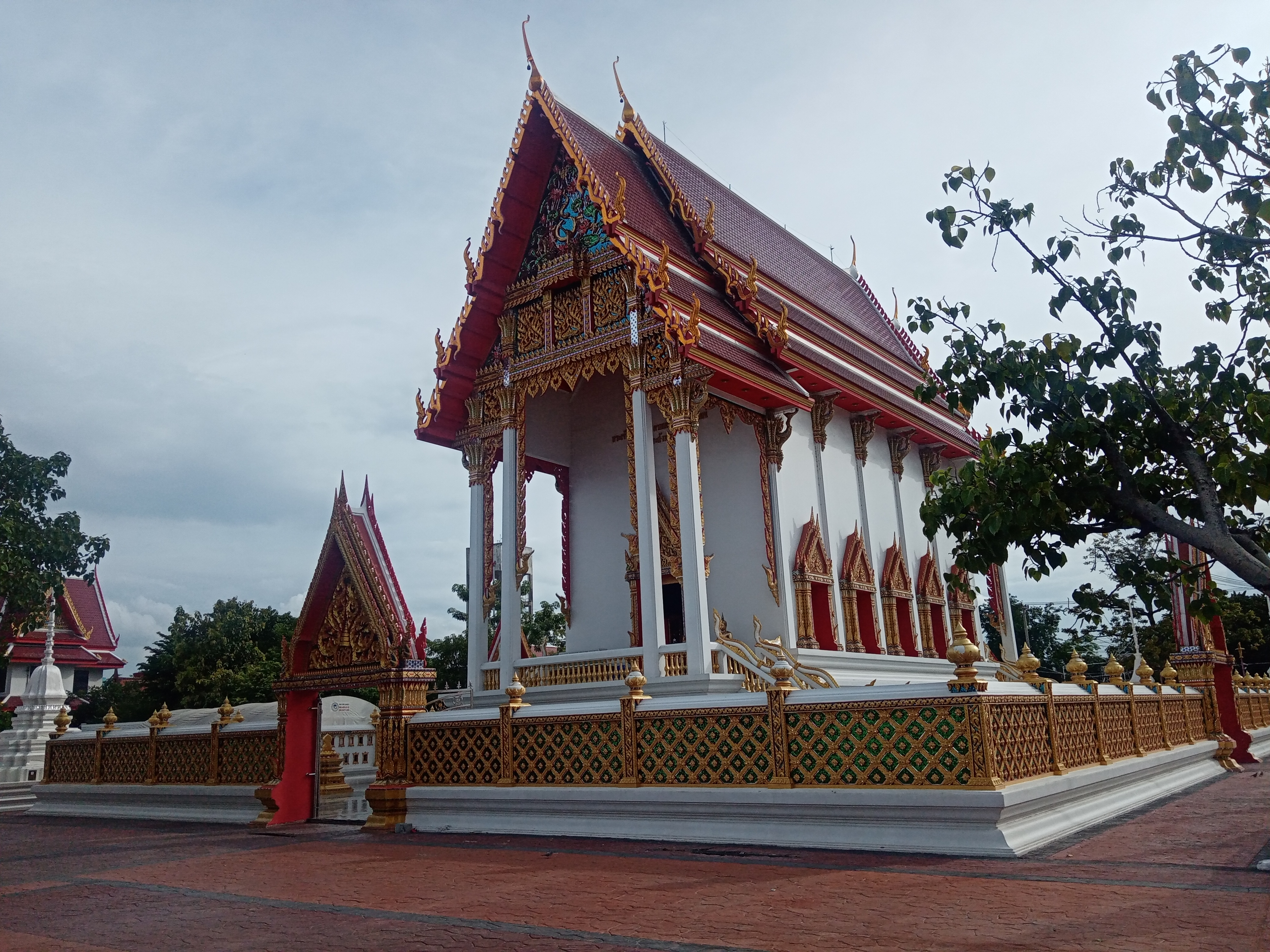
The ordination hall of Wat Jinavararam.

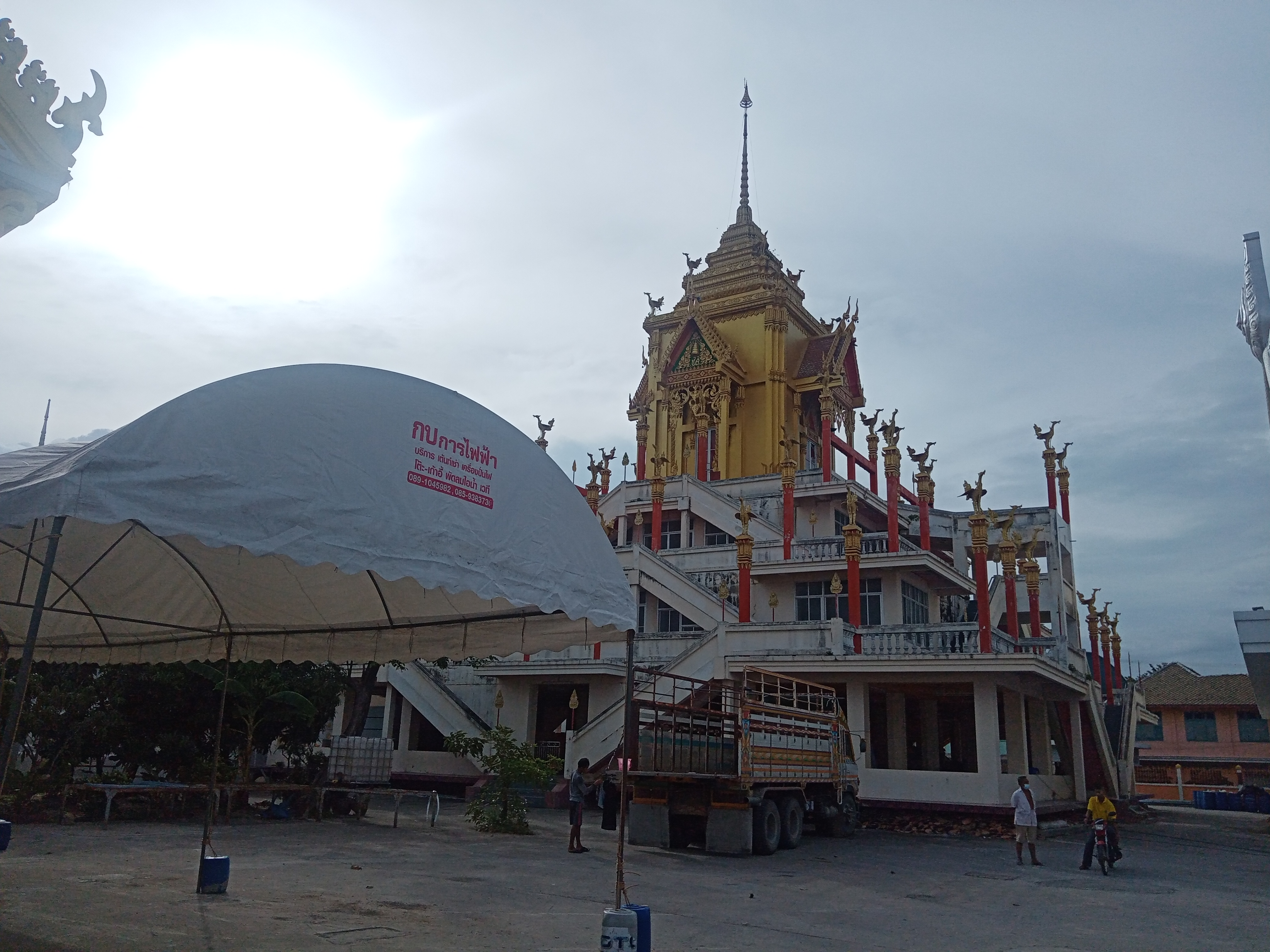
The mondop built by Jinavara Sirivaddhana at Wat Jinavararam.

Jinavara's ecclesiastical and scholarly work included the revision of the Siamrat edition of the Pāli Canon, leadership of the Dhammayuttika Nikaya, service as chairman of Mahamakut Buddhist College, support for Pali and Buddhist education, and the establishment of the Mahamakut Buddhist University Foundation. His 2025 posthumous elevation to the rank of Somdet Phra Maha Samana Chao was accompanied by a royal proclamation that cited his work in Buddhist education, the Siamrat Tipiṭaka, the foundation, and the Dhamma studies examination system for laypeople.

In 1920s, Jinavara renovated Wat Makham Tai (วัดมะขามใต้), an ancient Maha Nikaya buddhist temple in Pathum Thani Province. He built a mondop in this temple to use as a crematorium for his mother because she was a commoner so she may not allowed to be made a royal funeral. When Mom Pun, Jinavara's mother, died in 1929, King Prajadhipok, as his disciple, gave his royal patronage for her funeral as a mother of the Supreme Patriach of Siam at Wat Thepsirinthrawat, Bangkok. After that, Jinavara brought her ash to place in this mondop along with a Buddha footprint replica. When Jinavara died in 1938, the regency council of Thailand under King Ananda Mahidol renamed this temple as "Wat Jinavararam" (วัดชินวราราม) and gave a status of a royal temple (third class), becoming the first royal temple in Pathum Thani Province.

== See also ==
- Supreme Patriarch of Thailand
- Dhammayuttika Nikaya
- Wat Ratchabophit
- Mahamakut Buddhist University

Buddhist titles
Preceded by Vajirananavarorasa	Supreme Patriarch of Thailand; 1921–1937	Succeeded by Ariyavangsagatayana (Phae Tissadeva)
Preceded by Vajirananavarorasa	Head of the Dhammayuttika Nikaya; 1921–1937	Succeeded by Ariyavangsagatayana (Phae Tissadeva)
