= Sangha Supreme Council =

Governing council of Buddhist monastic order in Thailand

- มหาเถรสมาคม; Mahathera Samakhom

Council overview
- Formed: January 1, 1963; 63 years ago
- Jurisdiction: Sangha of Thailand
- Headquarters: Nakhon Pathom, Thailand
- Council executive: Ariyavangsagatayana IX, Supreme Patriarch
- Website: www.mahathera.org

The Sangha Supreme Council (Thai: มหาเถรสมาคม; Pali: Mahāthera Samāgama) is the governing body of the Buddhist order (Sangha) of Thailand, and is the ultimate authority for all ecclesiastical matters within the Thai Sangha. Its leadership consists of the country's highest ranking monks, who consult the Supreme Patriarch of Thailand with respect to administrative and theological matters. The Sangha Supreme Council was established on 1 January 1963, under the Sangha Act of 1962.

== Members of Sangha Supreme Council ==
=== President of Sangha Supreme Council ===
- Somdet Phra Ariyavongsagatanana IX (Amborn Ambaro), member of the Dhammayuttika order, abbot of Wat Ratchabophit, bestowed the title of Somdet in 2009, was appointed Supreme Patriarch in 2017.

=== Councilors as of 10 December 2023 ===
1. Somdet Phra Thirayanmuni (Somchai Varajāyo) – สมเด็จพระธีรญาณมุนี (สมชาย วรชาโย)
2. Somdet Phra Phuthachan (Sanit Javanapañño) – สมเด็จพระพุฒาจารย์ (สนิท ชวนปญฺโญ)
3. Somdet Phra Maha Thirachan (Pasarit Khemaṅkaro) – สมเด็จพระมหาธีราจารย์ (ปสฤทธ์ เขมงฺกโร)
4. Somdet Phra Maha Wirawong (Suchin Aggajino) – สมเด็จพระมหาวีรวงศ์ (สุชิน อคฺคชิโน)
5. Somdet Phra Maha Ratchamongkhonmuni (Thongchai Dhammadhajo) – สมเด็จพระมหารัชมงคลมุนี (ธงชัย ธมฺมธโช)
6. Somdet Phra Phutthaphotchanawachiramuni (Montri Gaṇissaro) – สมเด็จพระพุทธพจนวชิรมุนี (มนตรี คณิสฺสโร)
7. Phra Phrom Moli (Suchat Dhammaratano) – พระพรหมโมลี (สุชาติ ธมฺมรตโน)
8. Phra Phrom Bandit (Prayun Dhammacitto) – พระพรหมบัณฑิต (ประยูร ธมฺมจิตฺโต)
9. Phra Phrom Kawi (Phongsan Dhammaseṭṭho) – พระพรหมกวี (พงศ์สันต์ ธมฺมเสฏฺโฐ)
10. Phra Phrom Senabodi (Phim Ñāṇavīra) – พระพรหมเสนาบดี (พิมพ์ ญาณวีโร)
11. Phra Phrom Wachiramuni (Choet Cittagutto) – พระพรหมวชิรมุนี (เชิด จิตฺตคุตฺโต)
12. Phra Phrom Muni (Bunrueang Puññajoto) – พระพรหมมุนี (บุญเรือง ปุญฺญโชโต)
13. Phra Phrom Watcharachan (Phunsak Varabhaddako) – พระพรหมวัชราจารย์ (พูนศักดิ์ วรภทฺทโก)
14. Phra Phrom Wachirakon (Sunthon Sundarabho) – พระพรหมวชิรากร (สุนทร สุนฺทราโภ)
15. Phra Phrom Watcharamethi (Somkiat Kovido) – พระพรหมวัชรเมธี (สมเกียรติ โกวิโท)
16. Phra Phrom Wachirawethi (Amon Ñāṇodayo) – พระพรหมวชิรเวที (อมร ญาโณทโย)
17. Phra Thammawisutthachan (Sawaeng Dhammesako) – พระธรรมวิสุทธาจารย์ (แสวง ธมฺเมสโก)
18. Phra Thammawachirayan (Chiraphon Adhicitto) – พระธรรมวชิรญาณ (จิรพล อธิจิตฺโต)
19. Phra Thammawachiramuni (Bunchit Ñāṇasaṃvaro) – พระธรรมวชิรมุนี (บุญชิต ญาณสํวโร)
20. Phra Thammawachiramethachan (Yutthasak Kittiyutto) – พระธรรมวชิรเมธาจารย์ (ยุทธศักดิ์ กิตฺติยุตฺโต)

== The Sangha Act in Thailand ==
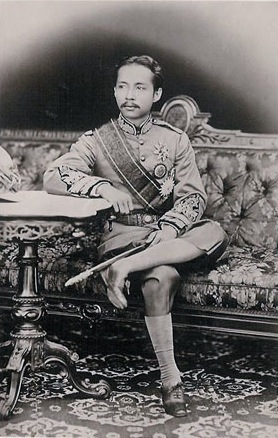
King Rama V, the Thai King who passed the Sangha Administration Act of R.E. 121 on B.E.2445 (1902)

- The Sangha Administration Act of R.E. 121 (1903 or B.E. 2446)
- The Sangha Act of B.E. 2484 (1941)
- The Sangha Act of B.E 2505 (1962)
- The Sangha Act of B.E 2535 (1992)
- The Sangha Act of B.E 2560 (2017)
- The Sangha Act of B.E 2561 (2018)
