= Vajirananavarorasa =

Supreme Patriarch of Thailand from 1910 to 1921

Somdet Phra Maha Samana Chao Krommaphraya Vajirañāṇavarorasa
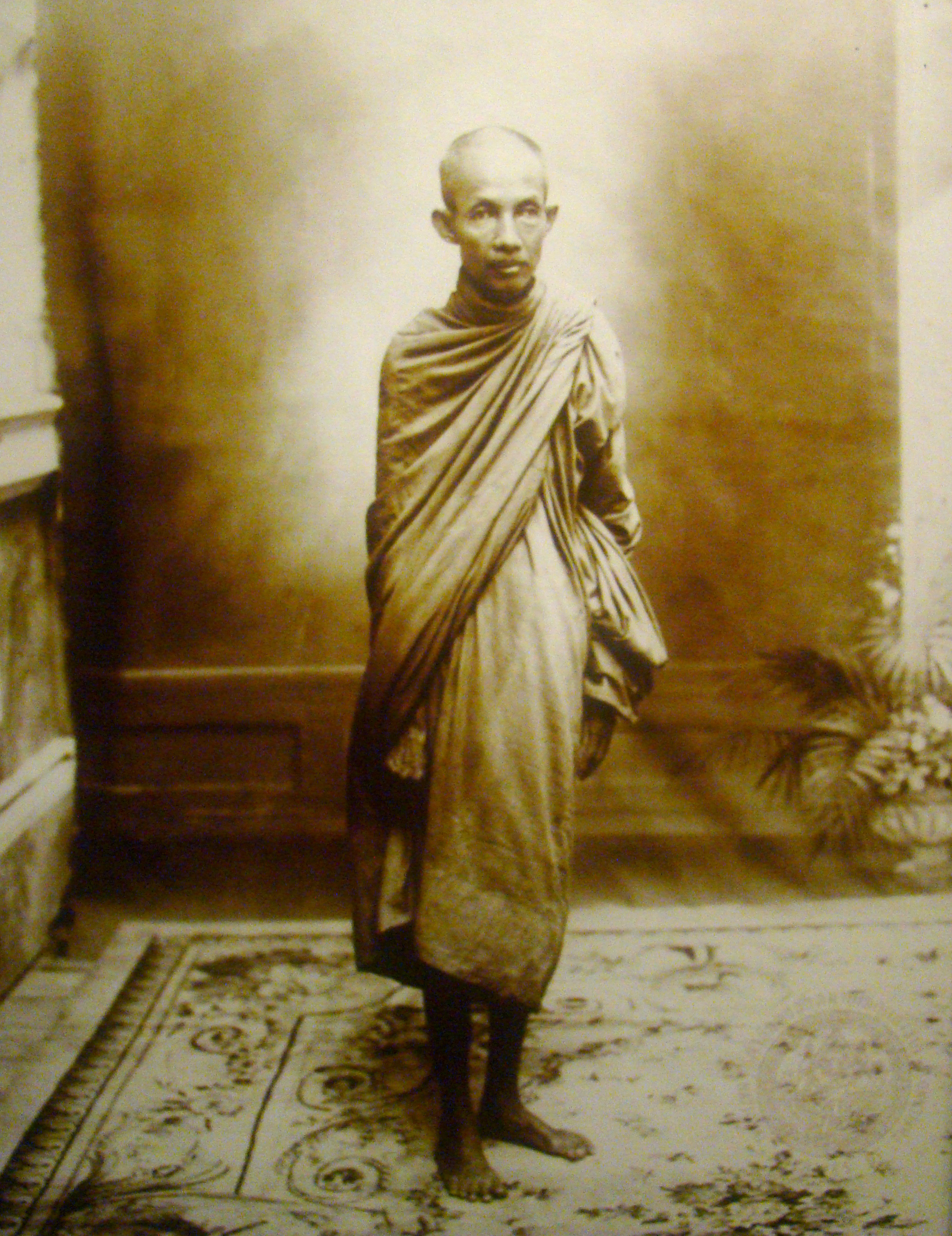

Supreme Patriarch of Siam
- In office 5 December 1910 – 2 August 1921

Personal life
- Born: Prince Manuṣyanāgamānob; 12 April 1860 Grand Palace, Bangkok, Thailand
- Died: 2 August 1921 (aged 61) Wat Bowonniwet Vihara, Bangkok, Thailand

Religious life
- Religion: Buddhism
- School: Theravada, Dhammayuttika Nikaya
- Dharma name: Manussanāga

Senior posting
- Predecessor: Ariyavangsagatayana (Sa Pussadeva)
- Successor: Jinavara Visuddhidevaryavongse

Vajirananavarorasa (also spelled Wachirayan, Watchirayanawarorot, correct Pali spelling: Vajirañāṇavarorasa, Thai: วชิรญาณวโรรส, full title Somdet Phramahasamanachao Kromphraya Vajirananavarorasa สมเด็จพระมหาสมณเจ้ากรมพระยาวชิรญาณวโรรส ) (12 April 1860 – 2 August 1921) was the tenth Supreme Patriarch of Thailand from 1910 to 1921. He helped to institutionalize Thai Buddhism.

Destined to become "the leading intellectual of his generation in Siam", in the words of the Thai historian David K. Wyatt (cited in Reynolds 1979:xiii), his royal name was Prince Manuṣyanāgamānaba (พระองค์เจ้ามนุษยนาคมานพ) ('he who is a nāga among men'). Vajirañāṇavarorasa is the name he received on a gold nameplate together with the Krommamuen rank on 16 March 1882.

== Early life and education ==
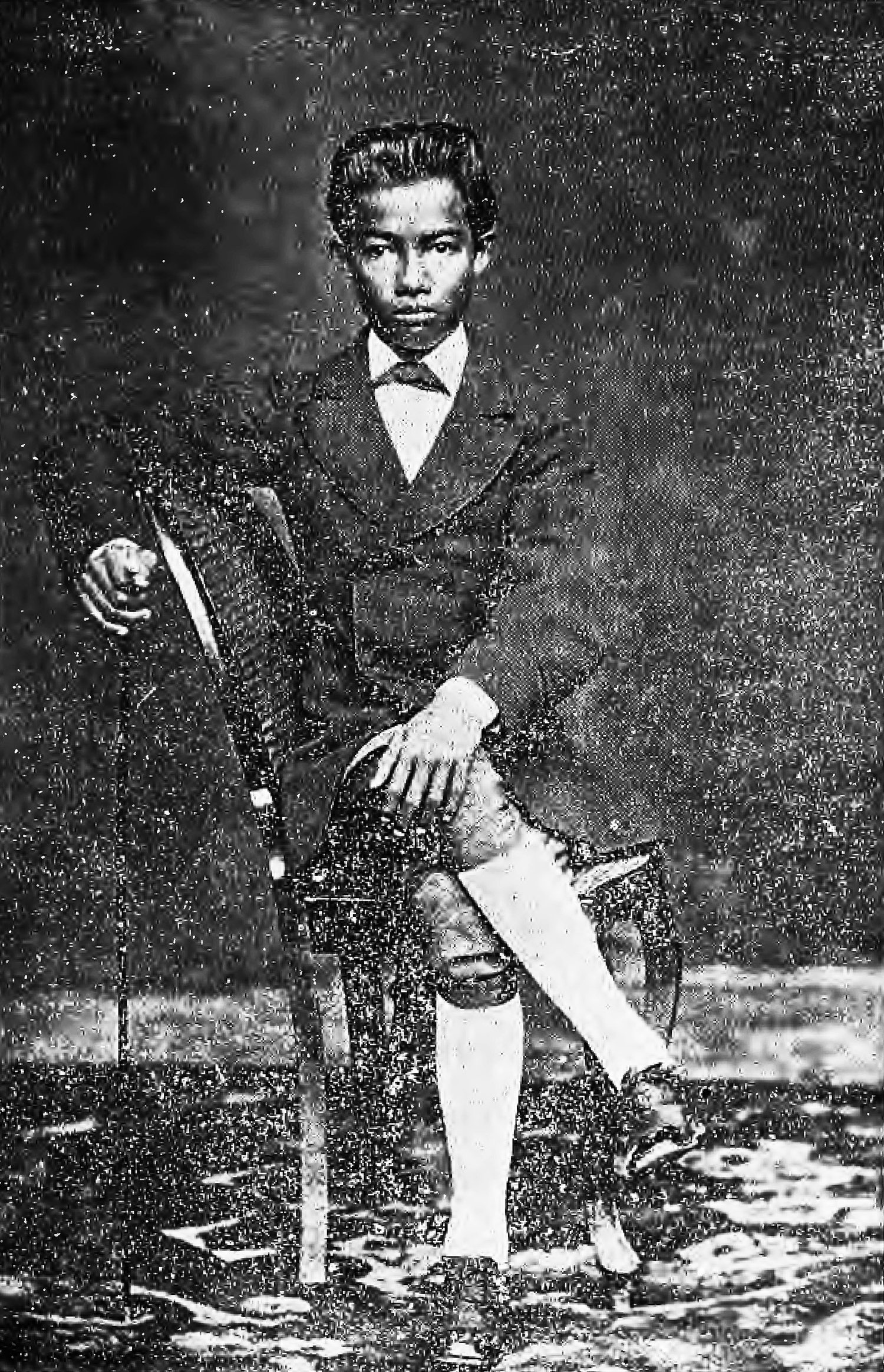
Prince Manuṣyanāgamānob before entering monkhood

Vajirañana was the 47th child of King Mongkut. He was born in the Grand Palace as the fourth child of Phae, one of King Mongkut's concubines. She died after giving birth to her fifth child, a daughter, when he was one year old. He was then fostered by a maternal relative, Princess Varaseṭhasutā or "Putrī", a daughter of King Rama III, and her mother, a royal concubine named Samaśakti or "Ueng".

In the palace, he was taught the Siamese alphabet by a woman, Nok Panakngan. The nobleman Phraya Pariyatidharrmadhātā or "Piam" (then called Luang Rājābhirama), deputy head of the Royal Pundits Department, came to the Palace to teach the young Vajirañana and other princes the Khmer script used to inscribe religious texts in Pāli. With a teacher who was official at the Outer Court, Vajirañana studied Padamālā (Pāli grammar), the Dhammapada commentary, and other texts until 1868. When his elder brother, Prince Brahmavarānurakṣa, ordained as a novice, Vajirañana was allowed to live with him in Wat Pavaraniveśa for some while. There he occasionally studied Pāli scripture with Phra Pariyatidharrmadhātā ("Chang", then Luang Śrīvaravohāra), one of the four section chiefs in the Royal Pundits Department, who taught monks and novices at the monastery.

After his father had died in 1868 and his elder half brother Chulalongkorn had come to the throne, Vajirañana was back at the palace, receiving more education from his foster aunt, Princess Varaseṭhasutā. With her he practised reading and writing Siamese, and he was taught verse forms, Siamese arithmetic, and astrology.

King Chulalongkorn founded an English medium school on the palace grounds and hired the Englishman Francis George Patterson for providing Western education. When the school first opened in 1872, Vajirañana began to study there. Patterson instructed the brothers of the king in the morning and the boys from the Royal Pages' Bodyguard Regiment in the afternoon. Patterson could not speak Siamese, and he used European textbooks, teaching English and French (reading, writing and speaking), mathematics and also some European history and geography. Vajirañana and Prince Damrong Rajanubhab were the most diligent of Patterson's students. Vajirañana continued his education with Patterson until 1875.

At the age of 13, Vajirañana was ordained as a novice for 78 days on 7 August 1873, with Prince Pavareś (สมเด็จพระมหาสมณเจ้า กรมพระยาปวเรศวริยาลงกรณ์, "Prince Roek" ฤกษ์, 1809–1892) as his preceptor. As a novice, he lived in Wat Pavaraniveśa, in a small residence known as "The Printshop": His father, King Mongkut, had once lived there as a monk and had printed his Ariyaka script there.

After having disrobed from his novicehood, Vajirañana got his first bigger amount of money to spend and discovered the world of consume. But in 1876, he met the young (between 25 and 30) Scottish physician Dr. Peter Gowan. Dr. Gowan taught him English here and then and a little about medicine, and he had a big influence on Vajirañana's life conduct (stop smoking, drinking and some prodigal or even dissolute habits). Getting more and more attracted to the monastery, Vajirañana went to visit his uncle, the reigning Supreme Patriarch Prince Pavareś. By him, Vajirañana was given instruction in poetry, astrology, and Buddhist scripture in 1876. He learned some additional astrology (i.e. how to do calendars) from two other teachers, Khun Debyākaraṇa ("That") and "Pia" (Phrakrupalat Suvaḍhanasutaguṇa at Wat Rājapratiṣṭha). Under the guidance of Prince Pavareś, Vajirañana also took up the study of Dhamma. He also invited one of his former Pāli teachers, Phra Pariyatidharrmadhātā ("Chang"), to come to the monastery to instruct him in Pāli again.

Vajirañana has always been very critical about the methods by which students learned Pāli and would later rewrite the texts for Pāli studies.

Although Vajirañana frequented the monastery, he could not yet decide himself to become a monk. From 12 July 1877, he also worked as a legal secretary for King Chulalongkorn for two years. King Chulalongkorn needed a reliable person such as Vajirañana in the Sangha, and he tried to persuade him to remain a monk even after his ordination according to custom. Though still unsure, Vajirañana promised that if he were to leave the monkhood, he would do so at the end of the first Rains. If he lasted beyond that, he would not disrobe. King Chulalongkorn then promised him to confer on him a princely rank and title if he remained in the monkhood for three Rains – a promise he fulfilled in 1882.

== Ordination and early years in the Sangha ==
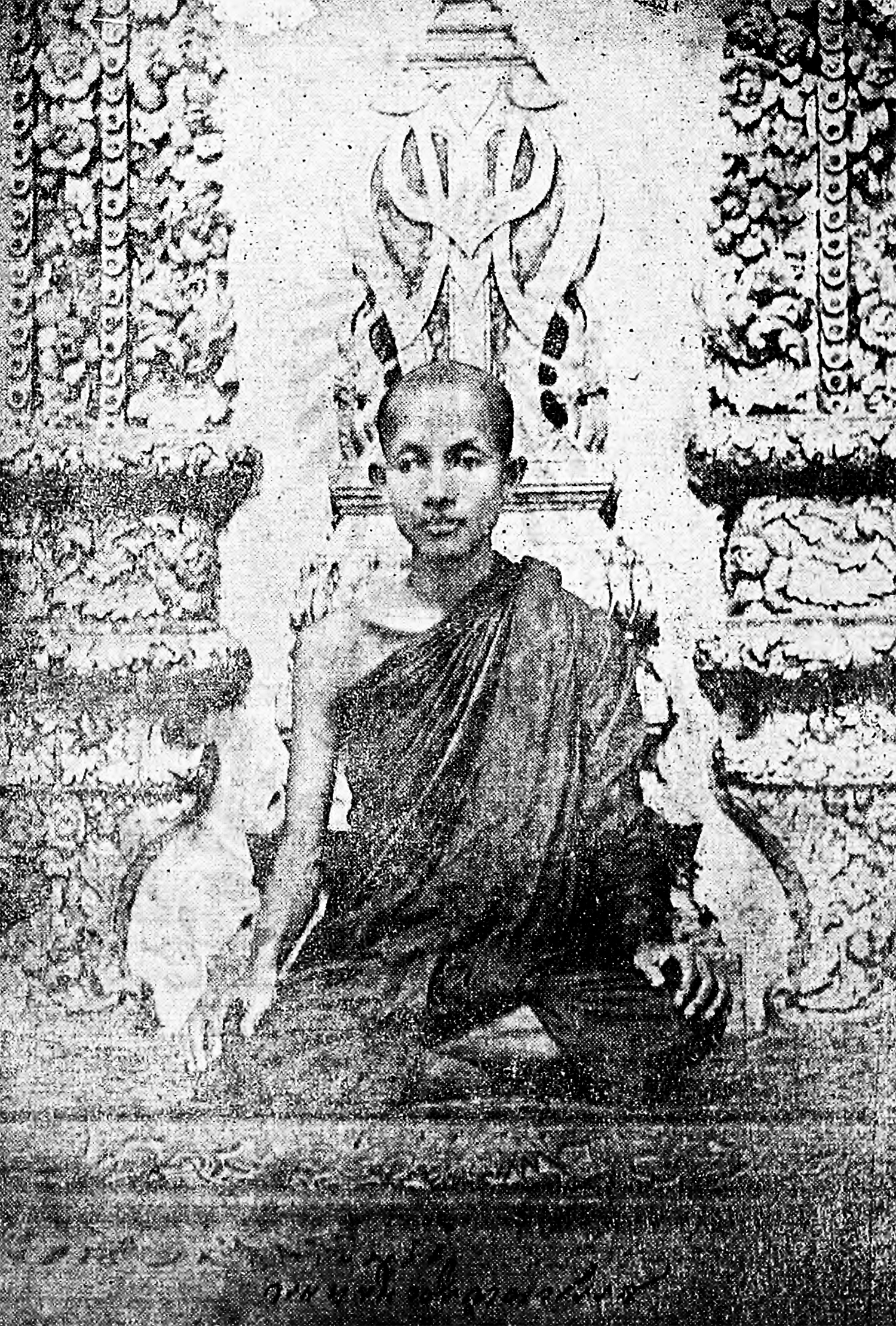
Prince Manuṣyanāgamānob, Kromma Muen Vajirananavarorasa at Wat Pavaraniveśa, circa 1881–1882

On 27 June 1879, Vajirañana was fully ordained in the Royal Chapel with Prince Pavareś (aged 71) as his preceptor. Another senior monk, Phra Candragocaraguṇa (Candrarańsī), Abbot of Wat Makuṭakṣatriya, assisted in the ceremony as kammavācācariya.

After the ordination rite, Vajirañana spent the first Rains in Wat Pavaraniveśa, studying Pāli (e.g. with the Dhammapada commentary) and Buddhist scripture. One of his former Pāli teachers, Phra Pariyatidharrmadhātā ("Chang") taught him again.

After the Rains, in November 1879, Vajirañana moved to Wat Makuṭakṣatriya (then called Wat Nāmabaññati). There he studied Pali (the Mańgalatthadīpanī) under Chaokhun Phra Brahmamunī (Kittisāra).

On 3 January 1880, Vajirañana was reordained in the orthodox Dhammayuttika manner on a raft, with Chaokhun Dharmatrailoka (Ṭhānacāra) being his preceptor. He continued to live in Wat Makuṭakṣatriya as a pupil and personal attendant of Phra Candragocaraguṇa, and as a Pāli student of Phra Brahmamunī.

On 25 December 1881, Vajirañana began his Pāli exam, the Supreme Patriarch being his examiner. He advanced to prayōk 5 at a stroke and was succeedingly raised to krom rank as promised before. He was also appointed Deputy Patriarch of the Dhammayuttika Sect (Chaokhana Rōng Khana Thammayuttikā).

== Middle years ==
In 1892, Prince Pavareś died. Vajirañana became his successor as Abbot of Wat Pavaraniveśa and as Patriarch of the Dhammayuttika order, while Sa Pussadevo became the new Supreme Patriarch.

On 1 October 1893, the Mahāmakuṭa Royal Academy (Mahamakut Buddhist University) was opened. Vajirañana now could carry out his reforms concerning the study of Pali and the Dhamma. Vajirañana wrote a Pāli grammar and several textbooks. He also designed the university's curriculum. It consisted of secular subjects such as reading and writing Siamese, history, and some science beside religious studies and the preparation for the Pali exam, as the new academy also served the purpose of training monks to become teachers. In 1898, King Chulalongkorn ordered Prince Damrong and Vajirañana to find a possible solution for providing the whole country with a primary education. Due to the lack of money the solution was to let the educated monks be the teachers of the villages in the outer provinces. (This plan, however, was not further pursued after 1902.)

In 1894, Vajirañana established Dhammacakṣu ('Eye of Dhamma'), the first Buddhist journal in Siam. It contained news on the academy, articles on Buddhism, and the texts of sermons.

While the Mahāmakuṭa Royal Academy belonged to the Dhammayuttika order, King Chulalongkorn also strengthened the school of the Mahānikāya order in the Wat Mahādhātu which in 1896 became the Mahachulalongkornrajavidyalaya University. The Sangha unity was also strengthened by the decision to hold the Pali examination in two sets: one at Mahamakuta Academy, where Vajirañana's new curriculum and a written examination format would be used, and one at the Royal Chapel, where the traditional oral translations would be heard.

The First Sangha Act of 1902 established a new administration of the Sangha in the country.

In 1906, King Chulalongkorn raised Vajirañana's princely rank to Krommaluang, although it was not royal custom to promote prince-monks until they reached advanced age. But Vajirañana should not be at a disadvantage in comparison with his brothers.

From 1900 to 1910, the position of Supreme Patriarch of Thailand remained vacant. Reynolds speculates that King Chulalongkorn didn't want to appoint a successor to the 9th Patriarch because a senior monk might have been too conservative to support the ongoing reforms, and Vajirañana might have been still too young to be able to assert his reforms against the will of the conservative senior monks.

== Later years ==
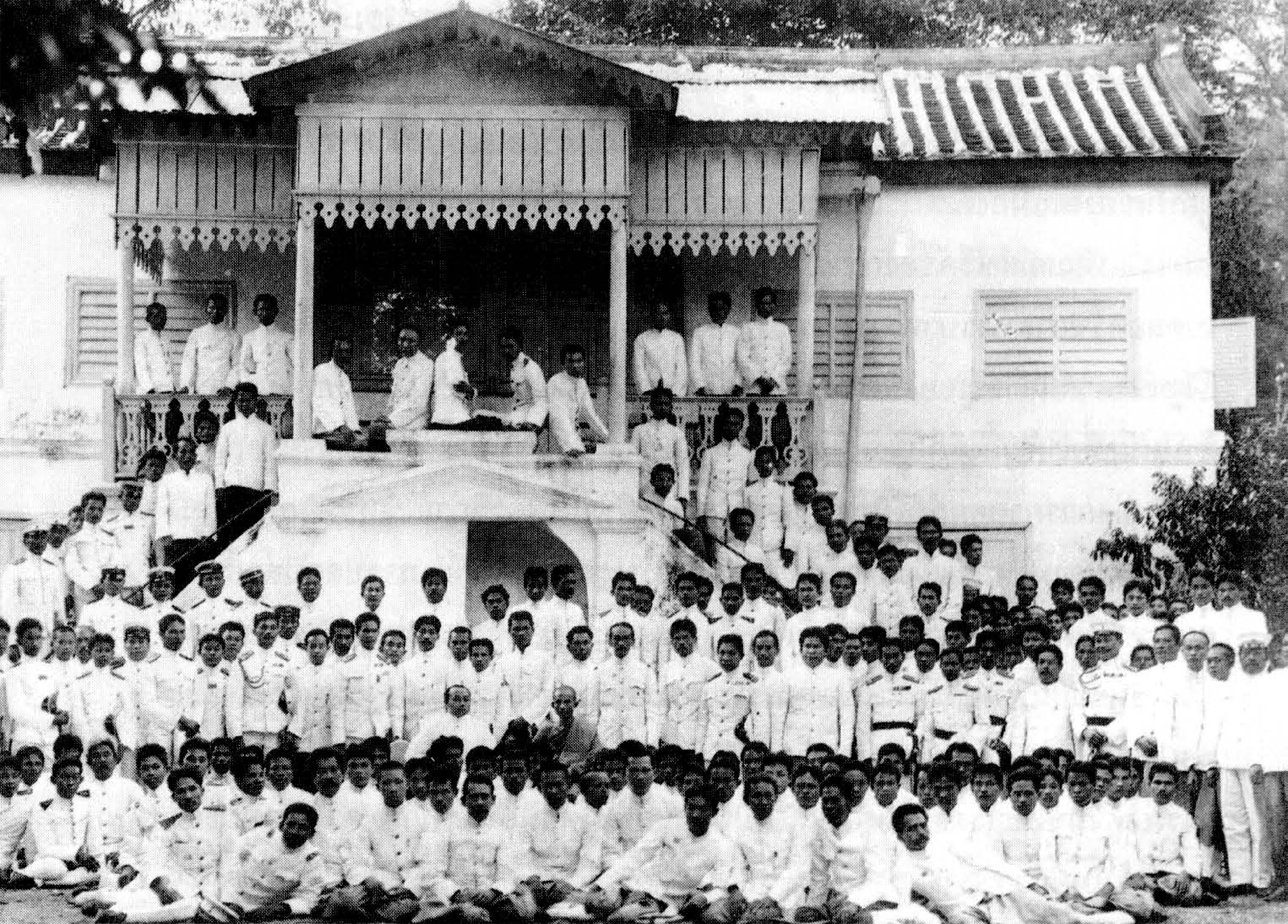
King Vajiravudh, Vajirañāṇavarorasa and government officials in front of the printing house of Wat Bowonniwet Vihara.

After the accession of King Vajiravudh in 1910, Vajirañana was appointed Supreme Patriarch. In 1921, King Vajiravudh created the honorary title Phra Maha Samanachao for the Supreme Patriarch. Vajirañana continued his work in religious education, Sangha administration and scholarship. He breathed new life to the Council of Elders (Thera), founded by the Sangha Act of 1902. The Publication of Thalaeng kan khanasong [Announcement of Sangha Affairs] which spread rules for the whole Sangha within the country. In 1912, he created a new curriculum for Dhamma studies that does not require previous Pali studies.

Between 1912 and 1917, Vajirañana travelled to the provinces of Siam to examine the situation of the Sangha. He later died of tuberculosis in Bangkok on 2 August 1921.

Buddhist titles
Preceded by Ariyavangsagatayana (Sa Pussadeva)	Supreme Patriarch of Thailand; 1910–1921	Succeeded by Jinavara Visuddhidevaryavongse
