= Ariyavongsagatanana (Amborn Ambaro) =

Supreme Patriarch of Thailand since 2017

Ariyavongsagatanana IX
- สมเด็จพระอริยวงศาคตญาณ
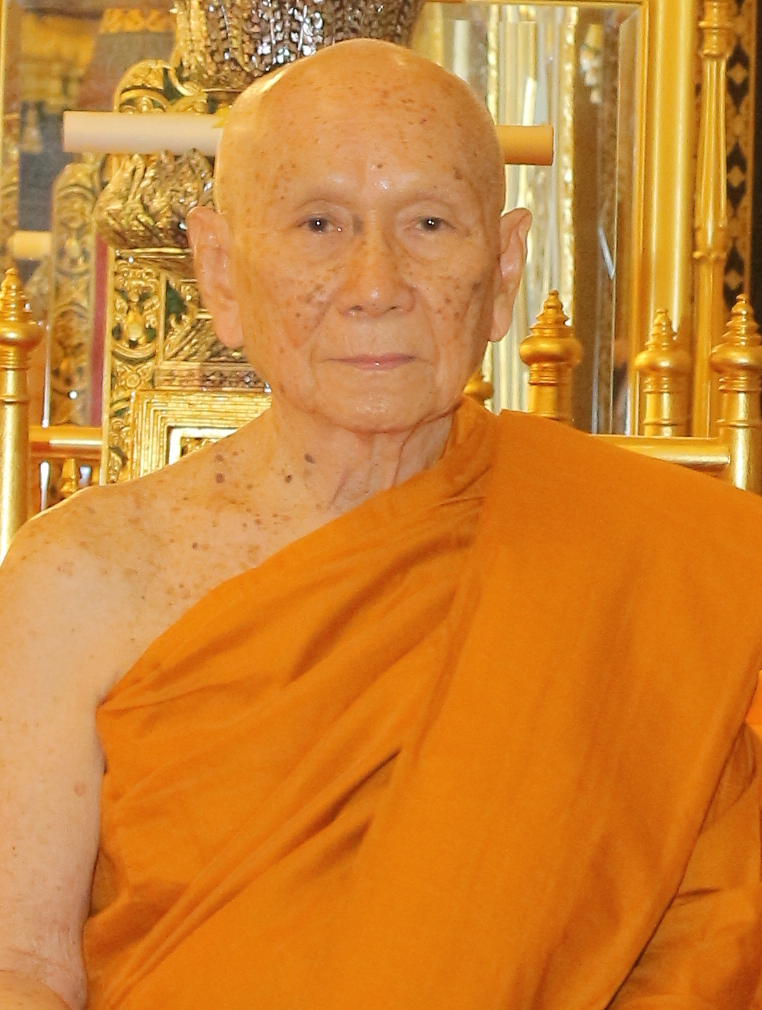
- Ariyavongsagatanana IX in 2017

20th Supreme Patriarch of Thailand
- Incumbent
- Assumed office 7 February 2017
- Preceded by: Vajirañāṇasaṃvara

Personal life
- Born: Amborn Prasatthapong; 26 June 1927 (age 99) Ratchaburi, Siam
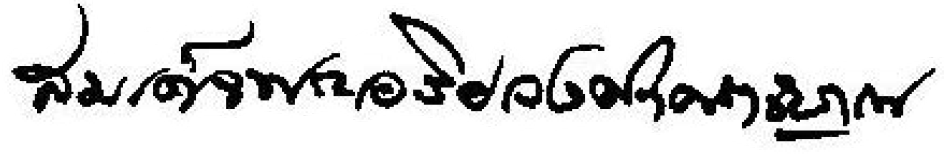
- Signature

Religious life
- Religion: Buddhism
- Temple: Wat Ratchabophit
- Order: Dhammayuttika Nikaya
- School: Theravada
- Dharma name: Ambaro

Somdet Phra Ariyavongsagatanana (Note: Thai: สมเด็จพระอริยวงศาคตญาณ) (born Amborn Prasatthapong (Note: Thai: อัมพร ประสัตถพงศ์); 26 June 1927), Dharma name Amborn Ambaro, (Note: Thai: อัมพร อมฺพโร) is a Thai Theravada Buddhist monk (bhikkhu) who is the 20th supreme patriarch of Thailand and superior general of the Dhammayuttika Nikaya. In 2008 he was appointed abbot of Wat Ratchabophit in Bangkok. In 2017, he was appointed Supreme Patriarch by King Vajiralongkorn, succeeding Vajirañāṇasaṃvara who died in 2013.

== Early life ==
Amborn Prasatthapong was born on 26 June 1927 at Mueang Ratchaburi, Ratchaburi Province to Nab and Tarn Prasatthapong, the second born of nine siblings. His family was of Thai Chinese descent. He was educated at Thewa Nukhro primary school in Lopburi. In 1937 he was ordained as a Samanera (or novice monk) at Wat Sattanat Pariwat in Ratchaburi. He studied the Pali language and graduated with a fourth level certificate in Pali studies in 1947.

== Monkhood ==
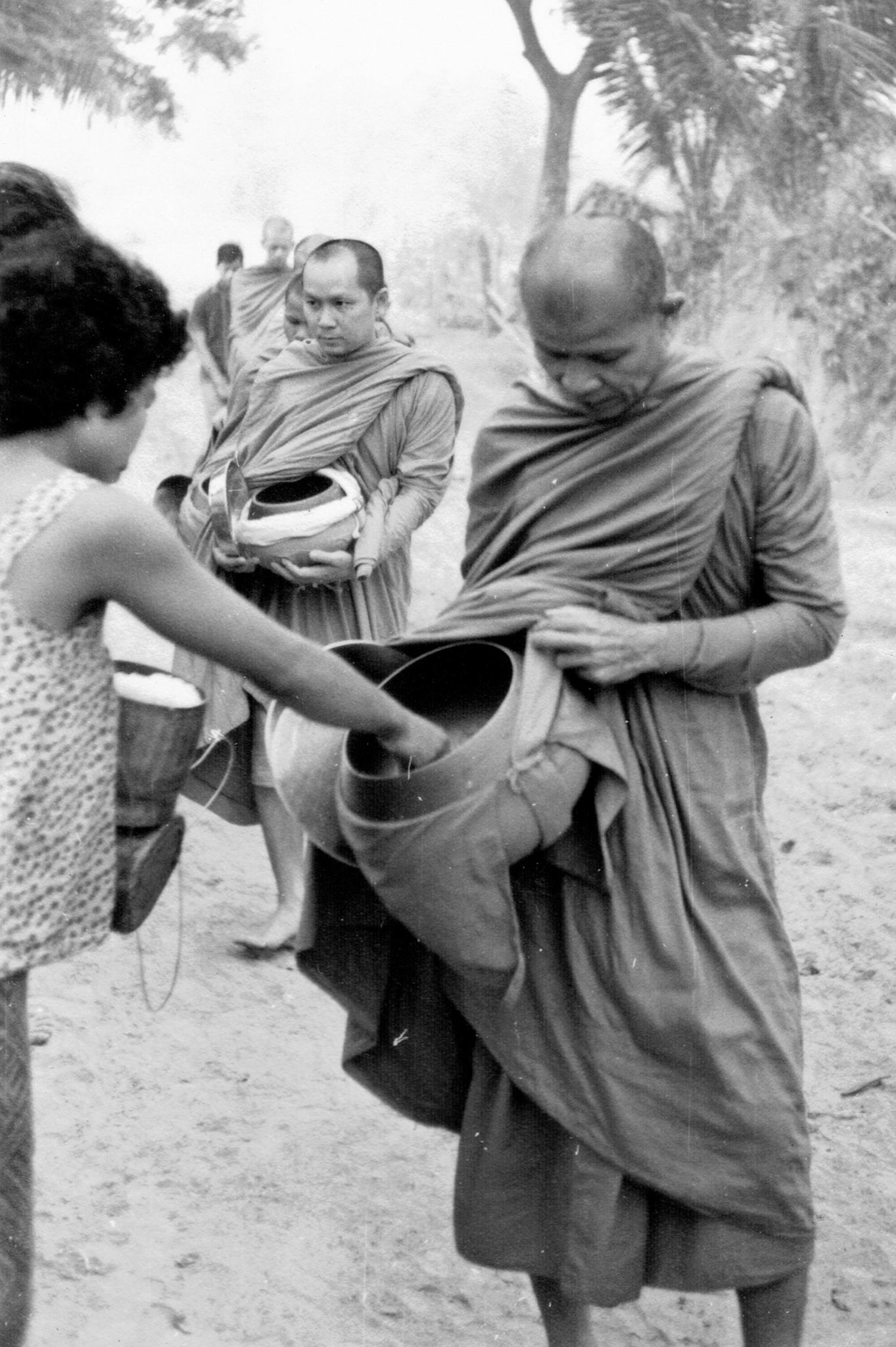
Phra Maha Amborn Ambaro following Ajahn Maha Bua for morning alms around Ban Taad, Udon Thani, in 1965.

On 9 May 1948, Amborn was ordained as a full bhikkhu, with the Dhamma name of Ambaro, in the Dhammayuttika Nikaya at Wat Ratchabophit in Bangkok, with Vasana Vāsano as his preceptor. Vasana Vāsano later became the 18th Supreme Patriarch of Thailand, reigning from 1973 to 1988. In 1950, Ambaro graduated with a sixth level in Pali studies. He continued his education at the Mahamakut Buddhist University, obtaining a degree in religious studies in 1957. And at the Banaras Hindu University in India, graduating with a master's degree in history and archaeology in 1969.

In 2009, he was presented with an honorary doctorate degree by Mahamakut Buddhist University. In 2010, he was presented with an honorary doctorate by Mahachulalongkornrajavidyalaya University.

Ambaro was a student of the highly revered monk Phra Ajahn Fan Ācāro, a Vipassanā master and the former abbot of Wat Pa Udom Somphon in Sakon Nakhon province. Ambaro was practitioner of the Thai Forest Tradition of ascetic monks, which were known for their devotion to meditation and only eating once a day. In 1973, Ambaro joined a group of Dhammaduta (Thai: ธรรมทูต), or 'the messenger of the Dharma', on a trip to establish Thai Buddhism in Australia.

In 2009, Ambaro was appointed abbot of Wat Ratchabophit, a royal temple of the first class, built in 1869 by King Chulalongkorn, where he has lived since 1948. On 5 December 2009, Ambaro was created the 2nd Somdet Phra Maha Muniwong (Thai: สมเด็จพระมหามุนีวงศ์) by King Bhumibol Adulyadej. This is a title given to a senior monk in the Dhammayuttika order.

== Supreme Patriarch ==
On 7 February 2017, Prime Minister Prayut Chan-o-cha confirmed the appointment of Somdet Phra Maha Muniwong as the 20th Supreme Patriarch of Thailand in a televised address. He succeeded Nyanasamvara Suvaddhana, the 19th Supreme Patriarch, who died on 24 October 2013 at the age of 100. The prime minister stated: "I submitted the names of five qualified monks for His Majesty to consider. On Monday night, I was informed His Majesty chose Somdet Phra Maha Muniwong."

Somdet Phra Maha Muniwong took the name Ariyavangsagatayana and became Somdet Phra Ariyavongsagatanana. On 12 February 2017, he was invested by King Vajiralongkorn in a ceremony at the chapel royal of the Temple of the Emerald Buddha.

== List of appointments ==
Styles of Somdet Phra Ariyavongsagatanana
- Reference style: His Holiness
- Spoken style: Your Holiness
- Alternative style: Sir

- 1996–present: Member of the Sangha Supreme Council for the Dhammayuttika order
- 2008–present: Abbott of Wat Ratchabophit
- 2017–present: 20th Supreme Patriarch of Thailand
- 2017–present: Head of the Dhammayuttika Nikaya order
- 2017–present: President of the Sangha Supreme Council

== Foreign Honour ==
- India :
  - Padma Shri (2018)

== See also ==
- Supreme Patriarch of Thailand
- Vajiralongkorn

== Notes ==
Buddhist titles
Preceded by Vajirañāṇasaṃvara	Supreme Patriarch of Thailand; 2017 – present	Succeeded by Incumbent
