= Supreme Patriarch of Thailand =

Head of the order of Buddhist monks in Thailand

Supreme Patriarch of the Rattanakosin Kingdom
- สกลมหาสังฆปริณายกแห่งกรุงรัตนโกสินทร์
- Insignia of the Supreme Patriarch

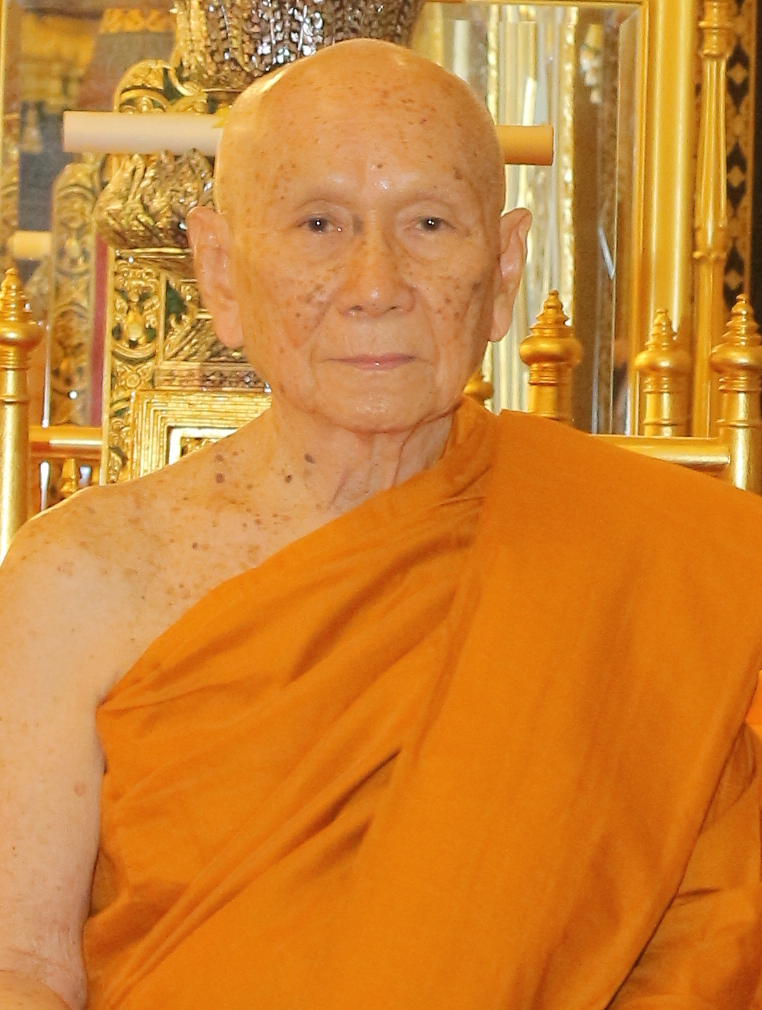
- Incumbent; Ariyavongsagatanana IX since 12 February 2017
- Style: His Holiness
- Member of: Sangha Supreme Council
- Appointer: King of Thailand and countersigned by the Prime Minister
- Term length: Lifetime
- Formation: 2325 BE (1782/83 CE)
- First holder: Ariyavongsanana (Sri)

The Supreme Patriarch of Thailand or Sangharaja (Thai: สังฆราช, romanized: Sangkharat, lit. 'King of monks' or 'king of monastic communities') is the head of the order of Buddhist monks in Thailand. His full title is Somdet Phra Saṅgharāja Sakalamahāsaṅghapariṇāyaka (Thai: สมเด็จพระสังฆราช สกลมหาสังฆปริณายก, romanized: Somdet Phra Sangkharat Sakonmahasangkhaparinayok, lit. 'the Supreme Patriarch, the Head of all Members of the Sangha').

== Ancient history ==
As early as the Sukhothai period (thirteenth to sixteenth centuries CE), there were city-dwelling and forest-dwelling orders, and there was more than one Supreme Patriarch appointed. In modern times, however, only one position is responsible for all fraternities and orders. From 1992 to 2016, the Supreme Patriarch was chosen from the most senior member of the Supreme Sangha Council and officially endorsed by the King. As of December 2016, the Supreme Patriarch was formally appointed by the King of Thailand and co-signed by the Prime Minister, with consultation of the Sangha Supreme Council, an administrative body of the Thai Sangha. The Supreme Patriarch has legal authority to oversee both of Thailand's Theravada fraternities, the Maha Nikaya and the Dhammayuttika Nikaya, as well as the small minority of Mahayana Buddhists in the country. He is also the President of the Sangha Supreme Council.

== Developments since the 2000s ==
There has been recent discussion about reforming the Thai Sangha's leadership structure, including a 2002 proposal which would have moved many of the Sangha Council's and the Supreme Patriarch's powers to a new executive council. However, in 2015, it seemed the junta was not pushing for new Sangha legislation after all, after the proposals led to many organized protests and heated debate.

The former Supreme Patriarch was Somdet Phra Nyanasamvara Suvaddhana, who had served in this position since 1989. After suffering from increasingly serious health problems, died on 24 October 2013, aged a hundred years. In 2003, because of questions about the Supreme Patriarch's ability to fulfill his duties, the government of Thailand had appointed a special committee to act in his stead. In early 2004, Somdet Kiaw Upaseṇo was appointed acting Supreme Patriarch, an office that he held until his death in 2013.

After the death of Somdet Kiaw, Somdet Chuang Varapuñño of Wat Paknam Bhasicharoen became the next acting Supreme Patriarch. Despite a nomination from the Supreme Sangha Council, his official appointment as Supreme Patriarch was stalled due a refusal of the Thai secular government to forward his nomination to the King. In December 2016, the junta passed an amendment to the Sangha Act changing the rules for appointment of the Supreme Patriarch to bypass the Supreme Sangha Council and allow the King of Thailand to appoint the Supreme Patriarch directly, with the Thai Prime Minister countersigning. While proponents considered the amendment a good way for politicians to solve the problems the Sangha had not been able to solve, opponents described the amendment as "sneaky" (Thai: ลักไก่). Chao Khun Prasarn Candasaro, vice-rector of the Mahachulalongkornrajavidyalaya University and assistant-abbot of Wat Mahathat Yuwaratrangsarit, stated the amendment showed a grave lack of respect for the Sangha Council's authority, because the council had not been involved in the amendment at all. He argued that the Monastic Act had always given the final decision to the King anyway, and pointed out that all conflicts about the appointment were caused by the junta's National Reform Council, not by the Sangha itself. Finally, on 7 February 2017, Somdet Amborn Ambaro was appointed by King Rama X to serve as the next Supreme Patriarch out of five names given to him by Prime Minister Prayut Chan-o-Cha. The appointment ceremony was held on 12 February at Wat Phra Kaew, Grand Palace.

== List of Supreme Patriarchs ==
No.	Portrait	Name	Birth name	Tenure from	Tenure until	Order	Temple
1		Somdet Phra; Sangharaja	Sri	1782/83; 2325 BE	1794/75; 2337 BE	Maha Nikaya	Wat Rakhangkhositaram
2		Somdet Phra; Sangharaja	Suk	1794/75; 2337 BE	1816/87; 2359 BE	Maha Nikaya	Wat Mahathat Yuwaratrangsarit
3		Somdet Phra; Ariyavongsanana	Mee	1816/87; 2359 BE	1819/20; 2362 BE	Maha Nikaya	Wat Mahathat Yuwaratrangsarit
4		Somdet Phra; Ariyavongsanana	Suk	1820/21; 2363 BE	1822/23; 2365 BE	Maha Nikaya	Wat Mahathat Yuwaratrangsarit
5		Somdet Phra; Ariyavongsanana	Don	1822/23; 2365 BE	1842/43; 2385 BE	Maha Nikaya	Wat Mahathat Yuwaratrangsarit
6		Somdet Phra; Ariyavongsanana	Nag	1843/44; 2386 BE	1849/50; 2392 BE	Maha Nikaya	Wat Ratchaburana
7		Somdet Phra Maha Samana Chao; Kromma Phra; Paramanuchitchinorot (Suvaṇṇaraṃsi Mahāthera)	Prince Vasugri	1851/52; 2394 BE	1853/54; 2396 BE	Maha Nikaya	Wat Phra Chetuphon Vimolmangklararm
8		Somdet Phra Maha Samana Chao; Kromma Phraya; Pavares Variyalongkorn (Paññāagga Mahāthera)	Prince Rurk	1853/54; 2396 BE	1892/93; 2435 BE	Dhammayuttika Nikaya	Wat Bowonniwet Vihara
9		Somdet Phra; Ariyavongsagatanana (Pussadeva Mahāthera)	Sa	1893/94; 2436 BE	1899/1900; 2442 BE	Dhammayuttika Nikaya	Wat Ratchapradit Sathit Mahasimaram
10		Somdet Phra Maha Samana Chao; Kromma Phraya; Vajirananavarorasa (Manussanāga Mahāthera)	Prince Manusyanagamanob	1910/11; 2453 BE	1921/22; 2464 BE	Dhammayuttika Nikaya	Wat Bowonniwet Vihara
11		Somdet Phra Maha Samana Chao; Kromma Phra; Jinavara Visuddhidevaryavongse (Sirivaḍḍhana Mahāthera)	Prince Bhujong Jombunud	1921/22; 2464 BE	1937/38; 2480 BE	Dhammayuttika Nikaya	Wat Ratchabophit Sathit Maha Simaram
12		Somdet Phra; Ariyavongsagatanana (Tissadeva Mahāthera)	Phae Phongpala	1938/39; 2481 BE	1944; 2487 BE	Maha Nikaya	Wat Suthat Thepphaararam
13		Somdet Phra Sangharaja Chao; Kromma Luang; Vajirananavongs (Sucitta Mahāthera)	Mom Rajavongse Chuen Navavongs	1945; 2488 BE	1958; 2501 BE	Dhammayuttika Nikaya	Wat Bowonniwet Vihara
14		Somdet Phra; Ariyavongsagatanana (Kittisobhaṇa Mahāthera)	Plod Ketuthat	1960; 2503 BE	1962; 2505 BE	Maha Nikaya	Wat Benchamabophit Dusitvanaram
15		Somdet Phra; Ariyavongsagatanana (Ñāṇodaya Mahāthera)	Yoo Changsopha	1963; 2506 BE	1965; 2508 BE	Maha Nikaya	Wat Saket
16		Somdet Phra; Ariyavongsagatanana (Uṭṭhāyī Mahāthera)	Chuan Sirisom	1965; 2508 BE	1971; 2514 BE	Dhammayuttika Nikaya	Wat Makut Kasattriyaram
17		Somdet Phra; Ariyavongsagatanana (Puṇṇasiri Mahāthera)	Pun Sukcharoen	1972; 2515 BE	1973; 2516 BE	Maha Nikaya	Wat Phra Chetuphon Vimolmangklararm
18		Somdet Phra Sangharaja Chao; Kromma Luang; Jinavaralongkorn (Vāsana Mahāthera)	Vasana Nilprapha	1973; 2516 BE	1988; 2531 BE	Dhammayuttika Nikaya	Wat Ratchabophit Sathit Maha Simaram
19		Somdet Phra Sangharaja Chao; Kromma Luang; Vajirañāṇasaṃvara (Suvaḍḍhana Mahāthera)	Charoen Khachawat	1989; 2532 BE	2013; 2556 BE	Dhammayuttika Nikaya	Wat Bowonniwet Vihara
20		Somdet Phra; Ariyavongsagatanana (Ambara Mahāthera)	Amborn Prasatthaphong	2017; 2560 BE	Present	Dhammayuttika Nikaya	Wat Ratchabophit Sathit Maha Simaram

== See also ==
- Buddhism in Thailand
- Mahanayaka
- Sangharaja
- Sangha Supreme Council
- State Saṅgha Mahā Nāyaka Committee
- Supreme Patriarch of Cambodia
- Thathanabaing of Burma
