= Wat Bowonniwet Vihara =

Buddhist temple in Bangkok, Thailand

Wat Bowaniwet Wihan
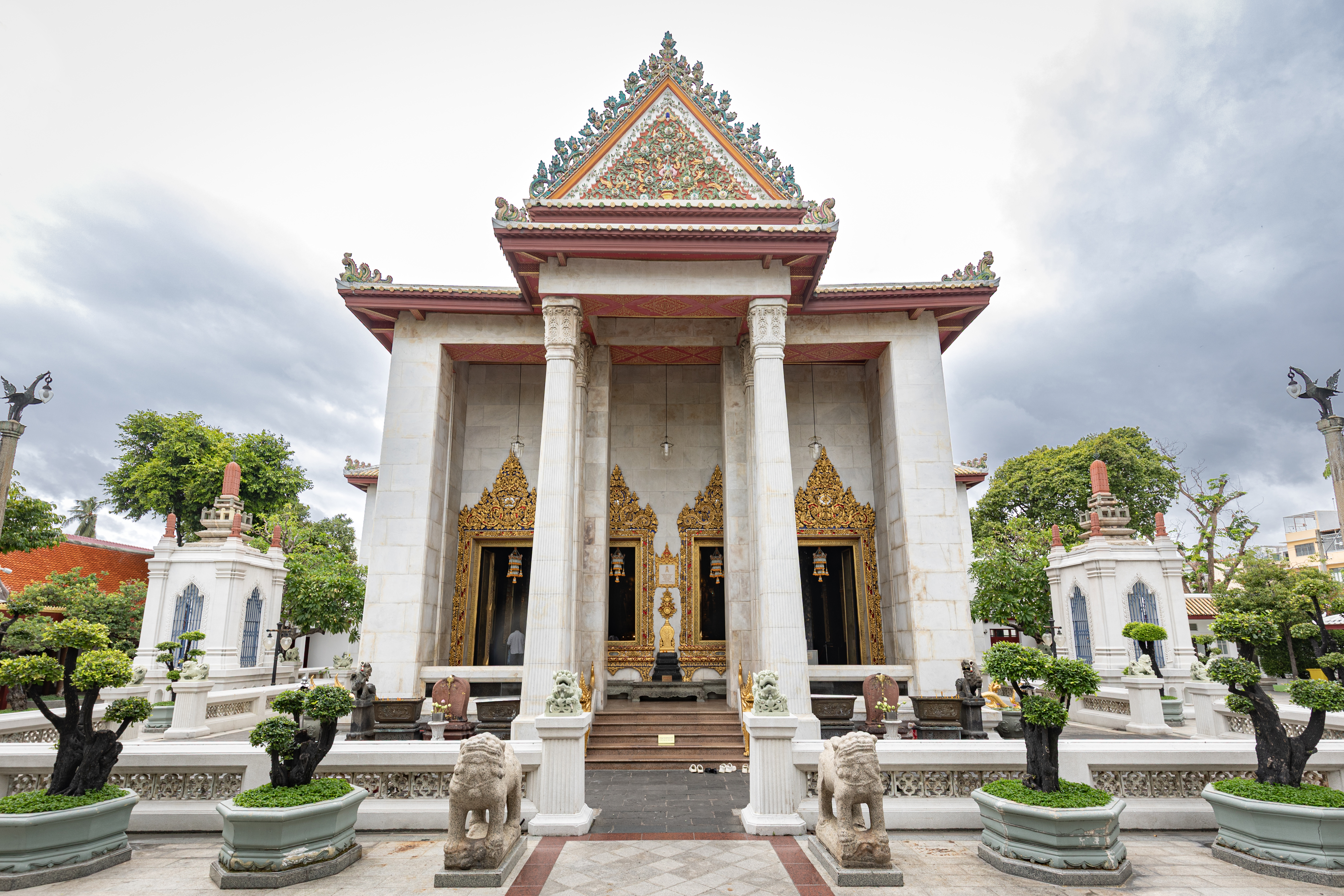
- The Chapel of Wat Bowonniwet Vihara

- Location within Bangkok

Religion
- Affiliation: Theravada Buddhism
- Sect: Dhammayuttika Nikaya

Location
- Country: Phra Nakhon district, Bangkok, Thailand
- Coordinates: 13°45′37.2″N 100°29′59.5″E

Website
- www.watbowon.org

Wat Bowaniwet Wihan Ratchaworawihan (Thai: วัดบวรนิเวศวิหารราชวรวิหาร; RTGS: Wat Bowon Niwet Wihan Ratchaworawihan, IPA: [wát bɔwɔːn níʔwêːt wíʔhǎːn râːttɕʰawɔːráʔwíʔhǎːn]) is a major Buddhist temple (wat) in Phra Nakhon district, Bangkok, Thailand. Being the residence of Nyanasamvara Suvaddhana, the late Supreme Patriarch of Thailand, it is the final resting place of two former kings of the Chakri Dynasty: King Vajiravudh (Rama VI) and King Bhumibol Adulyadej (Rama IX). The temple was established in 1824 by Mahasakti Pol Sep, viceroy during the reign of King Rama III (r. 1824–51).

The temple is a center of the Thammayut Nikaya order of Thai Theravada Buddhism. It is the shrine-hall of Phra Phuttha Chinnasi (พระพุทธชินสีห์), a statue of the Buddha which dates to around 1357. Bowonniwet has been a major temple of patronage for the ruling Chakri dynasty. It is where many royal princes and kings studied and served their monkhood, including King Bhumibol and his son, the present king Vajiralongkorn.

== Architecture ==
The golden chedi at the wat's shrine carries the relics and ashes of Thai royals. The two viharas are closed to public. The T-shaped bot holds a magnificent Sukhothai-period Buddha, cast in 1257 CE to celebrate freedom from the Khmers.

The murals on the bot's interior walls were traditionally light and limited in their subject matter and style. They were painted to appear three-dimensional. Monk artist Khrua In Khong introduced Western style in the murals depicting Buddhist subjects.

== Royal patronage and history ==
In 1836, Prince Bhikkhu Mongkut (ordination name: Vajirañāṇo) arrived at the temple and became its first abbot, founding the Thammayut Nikkaya order. He stayed at the temple for 27 years before acceding the throne of Siam as King Rama IV.

His great-grandson, King Bhumibol Adulyadej (Rama IX; ordination name: Bhumibalo), was ordained a monk at Wat Phra Kaew, and resided in Bowonniwet for 15 days in 1956. Bhumibol's mentor, Somdet Phra Yanasangworn, eventually became abbot of the temple, and later the Supreme Patriarch of Thailand. In 1978, King Bhumibol's son, King Vajiralongkorn (Rama X; ordination name: Vajirālankaraṇo), was also ordained and spent 15 days at Bowonniwet. Several of his sons from his second wife, Yuvadhida Polpraserth, later did the same.

In October 1976, exiled dictator and former Prime Minister, Field Marshal Thanom Kittikachorn, returned to Thailand as a novice monk to enter Bowonniwet. This sparked large public demonstrations and a bloody crackdown that became known as the Thammasat University massacre or the "6 October Event".

== List of abbots ==
No.	Portrait	Name	Tenure from	Tenure until
1		Prince Mongkut; (Vajirañāṇo Bhikkhu)	1836	1851
2		Somdet Phra Maha Samana Chao; Kromma Phraya Pavares Variyalongkorn; (Prince Rurk Paññāaggo)	1851	1892
3		Somdet Phra Maha Samana Chao; Kromma Phraya Vajirananavarorasa; (Prince Manusyanagamanob Manussanāgo)	1892	1921
4		Somdet Phra Sangharaja Chao; Kromma Luang Vajirananavongs; (Mom Rajavongse Chuen Navavongs Sucitto)	1921	1958
5		Phra Brahmamuni; (Pin Thammaprathip Suvaco)	1958	1961
6		Somdet Phra Nyanasamvara; (Charoen Khachawat Suvaḍḍhano)	1961	2013
7		Somdet Phra Vanarata; (Chun Brahmaphithak Brahmagutto)	2015	2022
8		Phra Brahmavajiraransi; (Chiraphon Phromthong Adhicitto)	2023	-

== Gallery ==
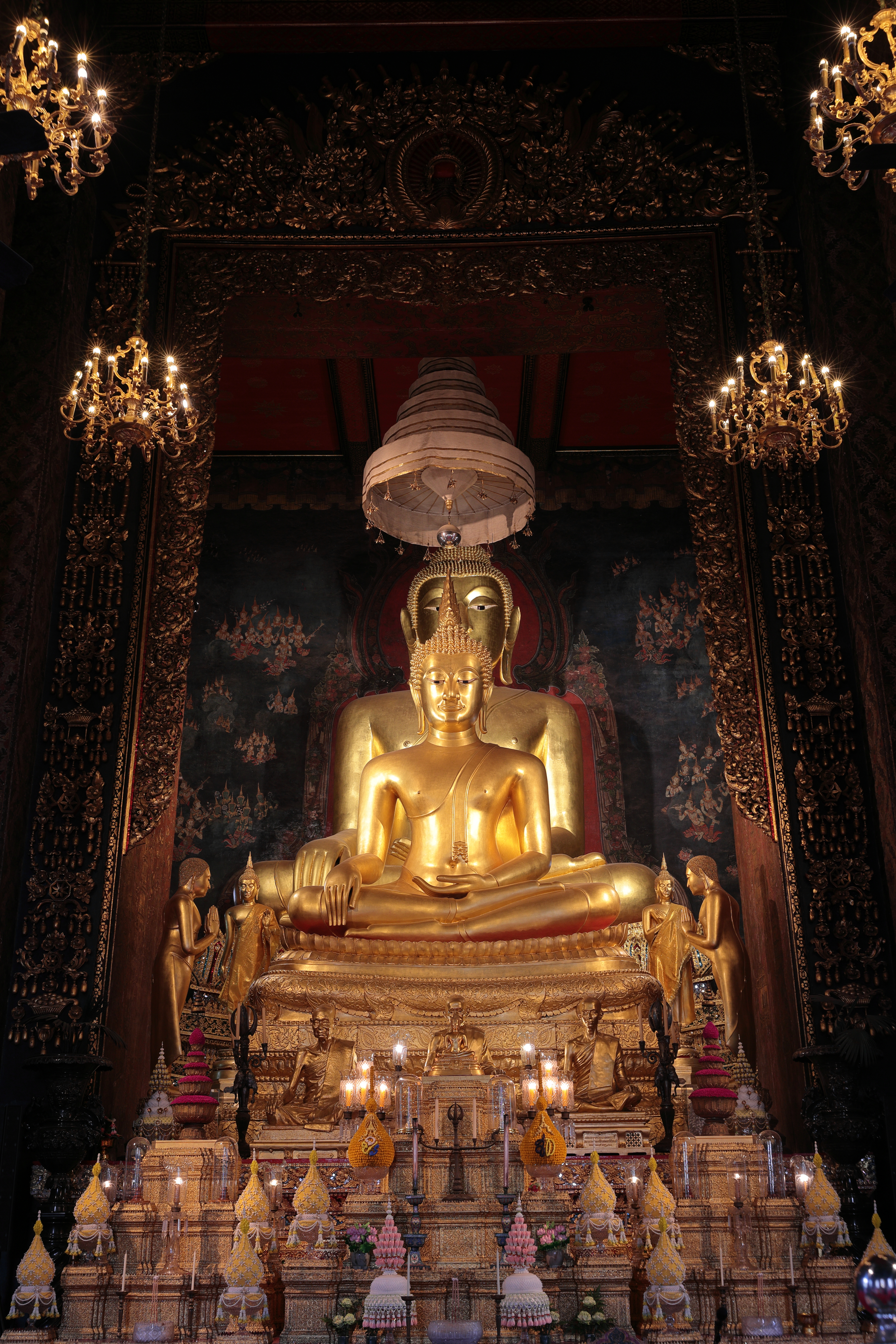
The statues of Phra Phuttha Chinnasi (front) and Phra Suwannakhet (back) in the main shrine hall. The ashes of King Rama IX are kept under the base of the statues

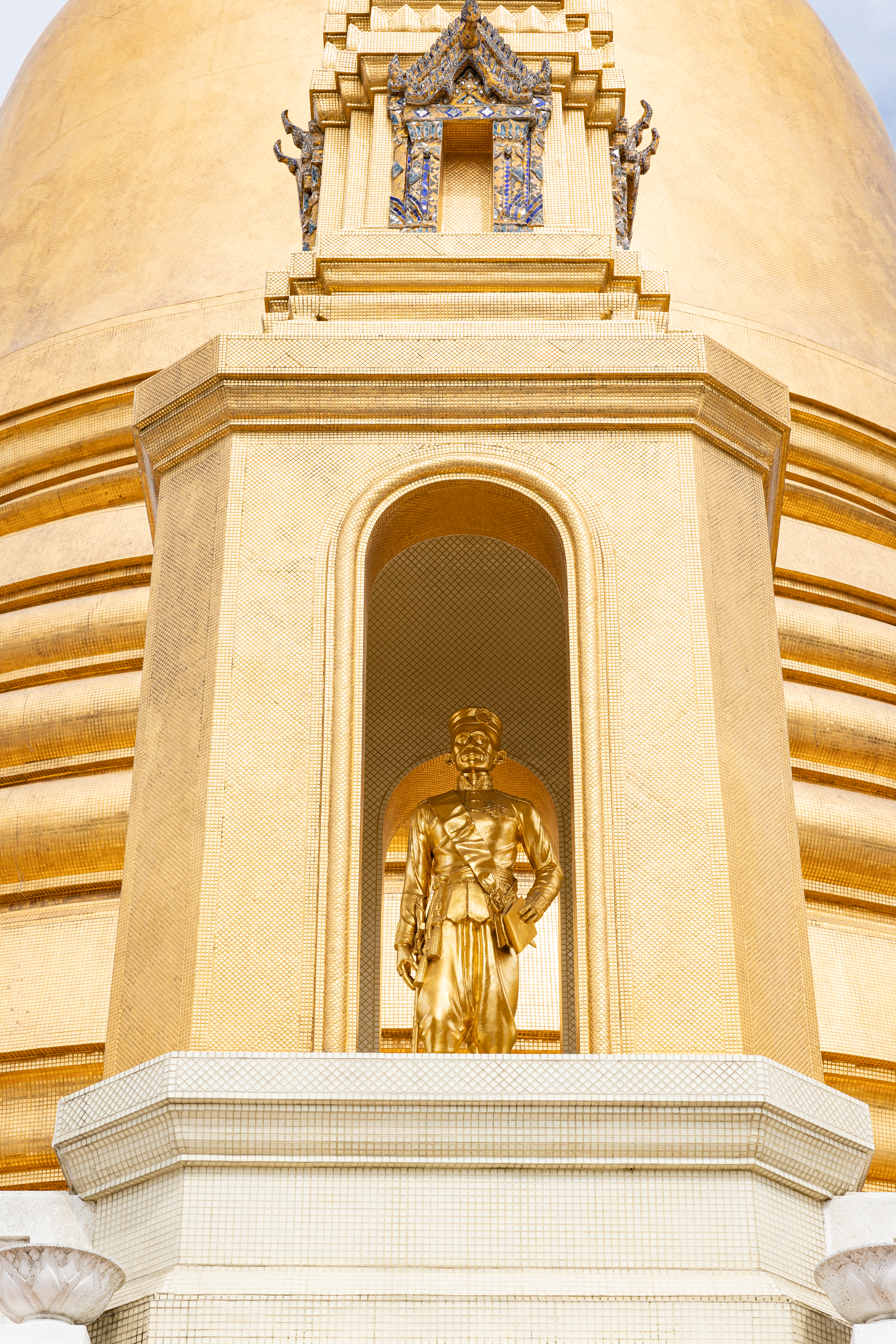
Statue of King Rama IV in a niche at Wat Bowonniwet

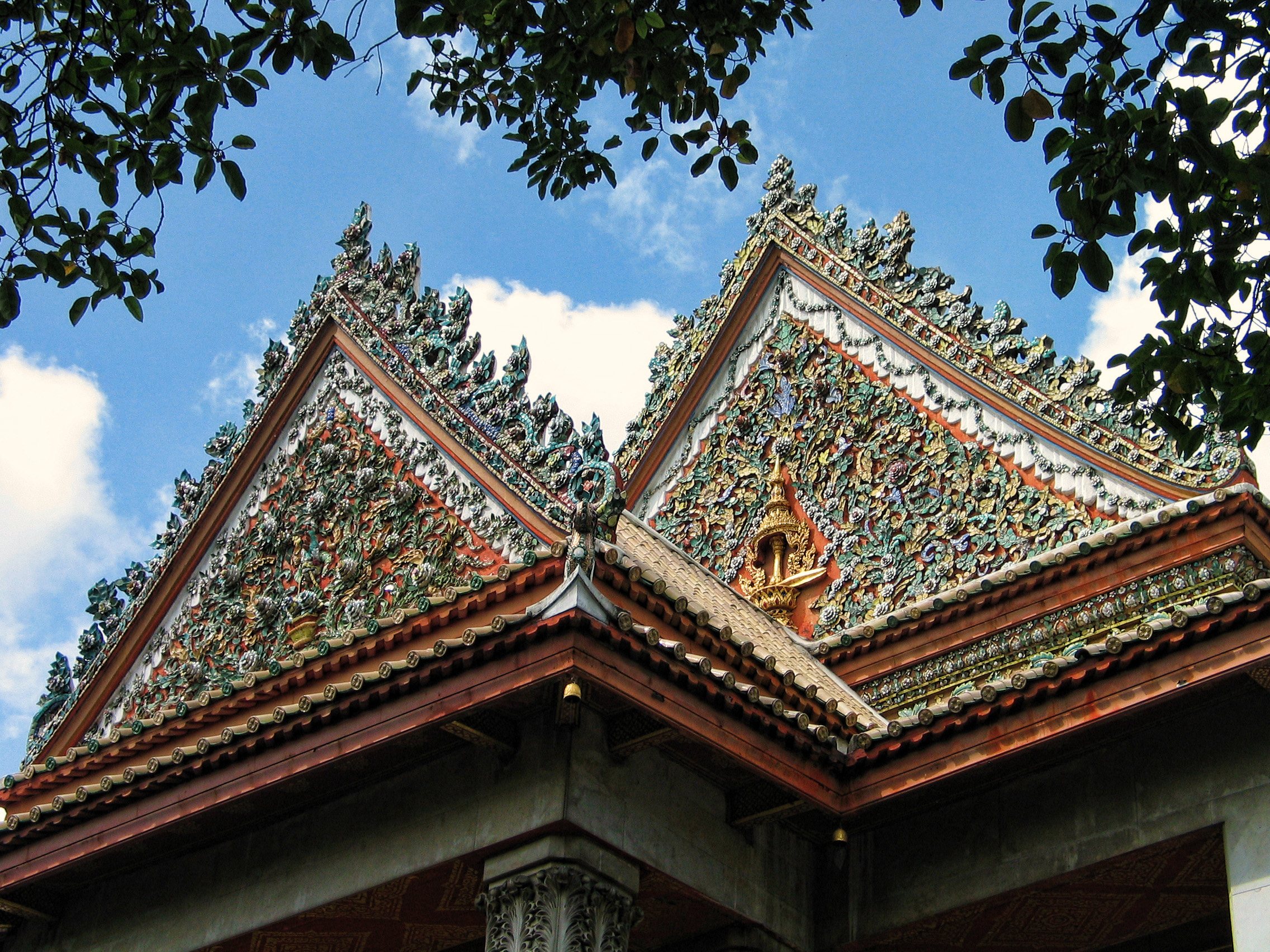
Ubosoth

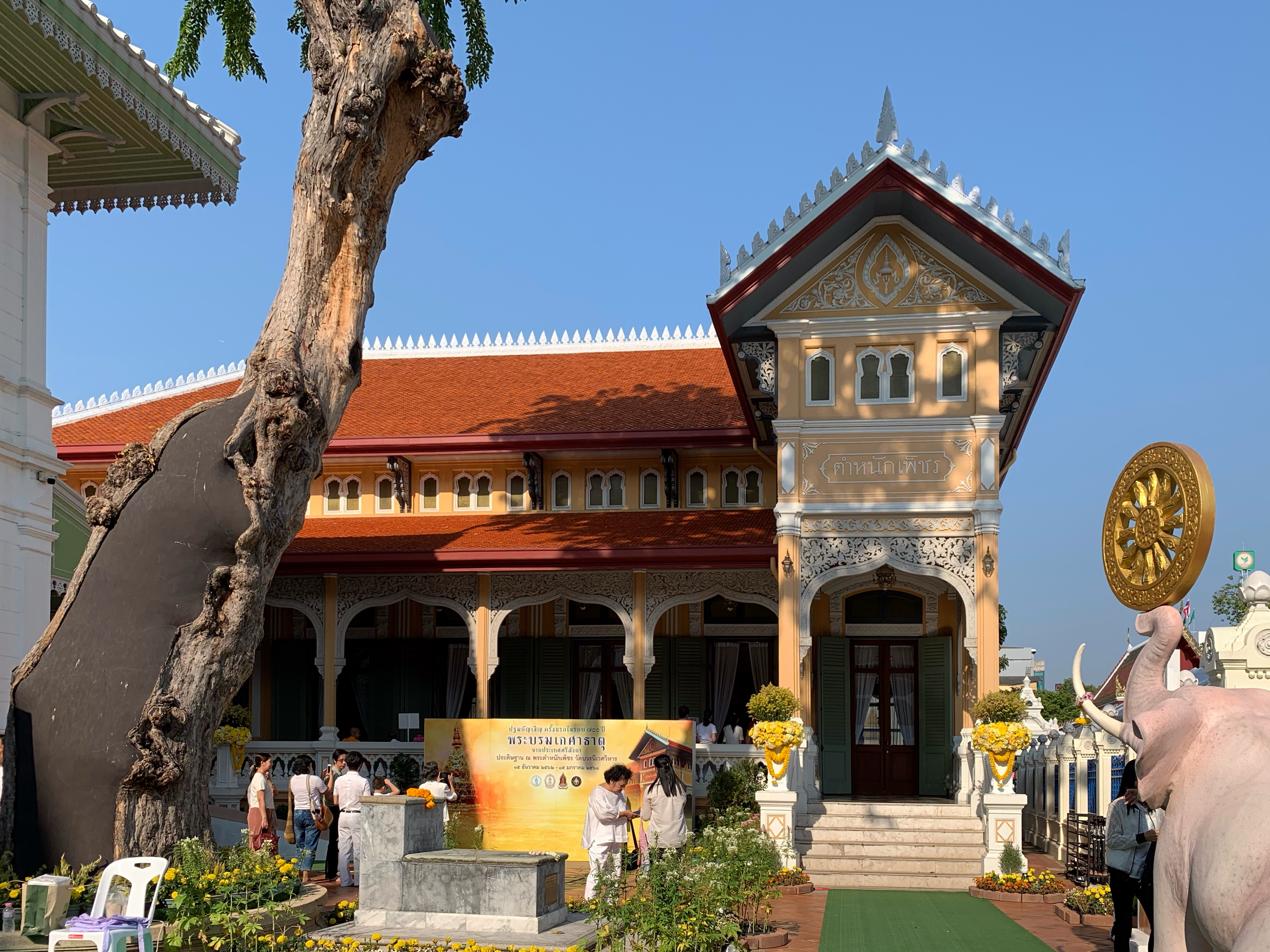
Phra Tamnak Phet (Royal Diamond Residence)

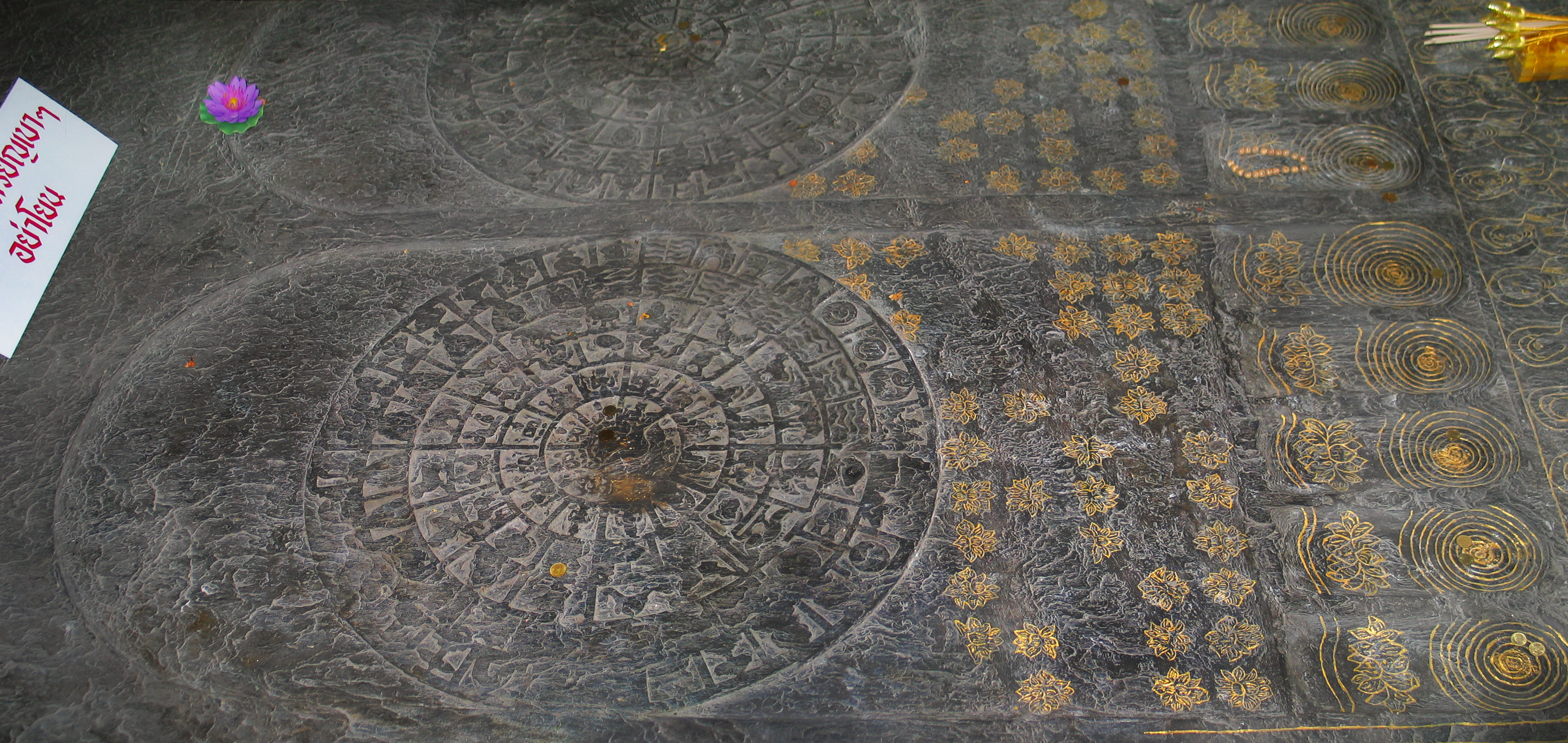
Buddha's footprint in Wat Bowonniwet, Bangkok
