= Phra Brahmapundit =

Thai Buddhist monk (born 1955)

Phra Brahmapundit (Prayoon Dhammacitto)
- Title: Phra Medhidhramabhorn; Phra Rajavaramuni; Phra Thepsophon; Phra Dharmakosajarn (2005)

Personal life
- Born: Prayoon Meereuk; 17 September 1955 (age 70) Suphanburi, Thailand

Religious life
- Religion: Buddhism
- School: Theravada
- Dharma names: Dhammacitto

Phra Brahmapundit (born 17 September 1955) is a Buddhist Chief Abbot of Wat Prayurawongsawat in Bangkok, and a member of the Supreme Sangha Council. He also serves as Rector of Mahachulalongkornrajavidyalaya University (MCU) in Thailand, and is the Ecclesiastical Governor of Region II. He is interested in interfaith dialogue and currently sits on the Board of World Religious Leaders for the Elijah Interfaith Institute.
