= Wat Ratchabophit =

Buddhist temple in Bangkok, Thailand

Wat Rajabopit Sathitmahasimaram
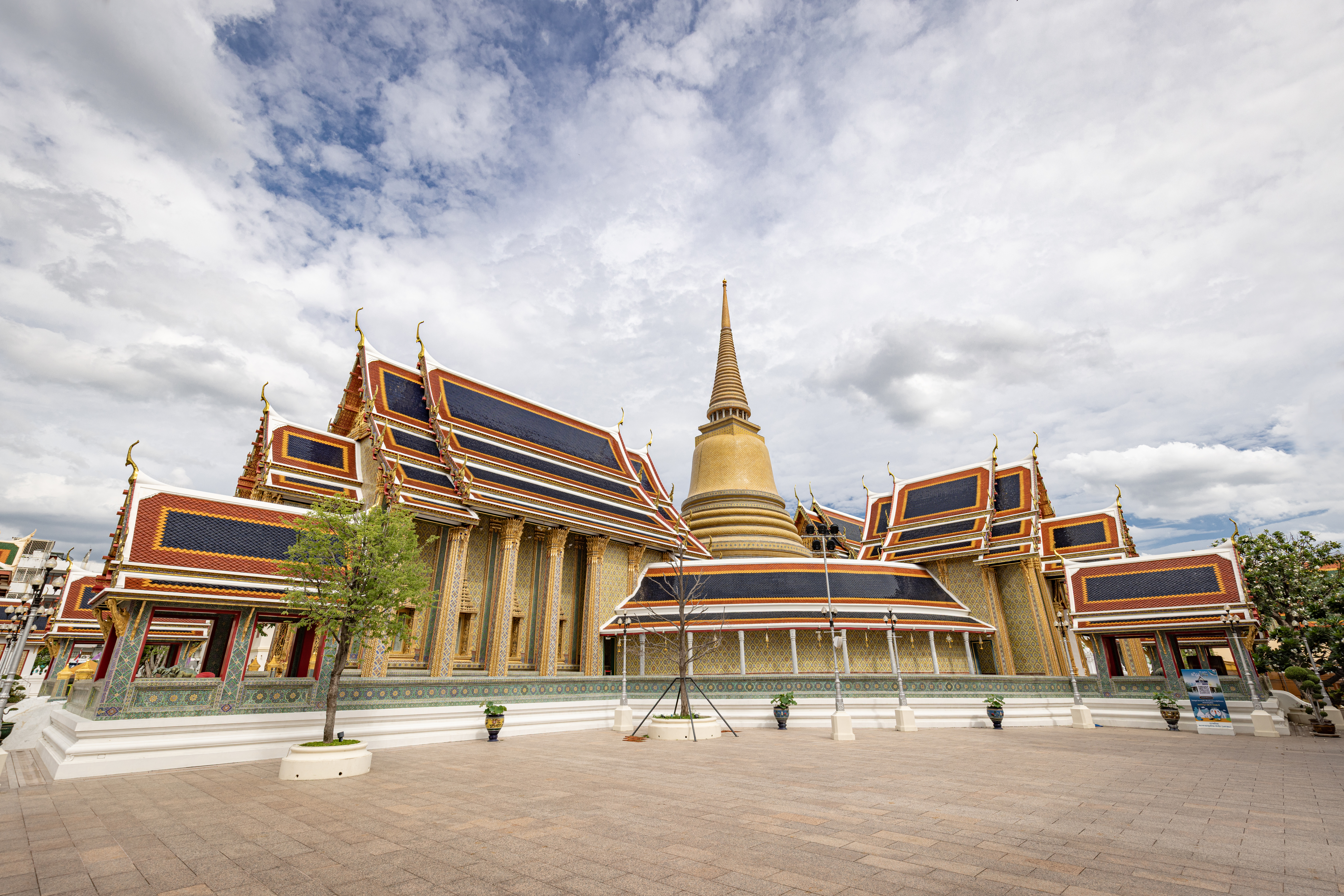
- Wat Rajabopit

- Location in Bangkok

Religion
- Affiliation: Buddhism
- Sect: Theravāda
- Leadership: Somdet Phra Ariyavongsagatanana (abbot)

Location
- Country: Thailand
- Coordinates: 13°44′57″N 100°29′50″E

Architecture
- Founder: King Chulalongkorn
- Completed: 1869

Wat Rajabopit (pronounced [wát râːt.tɕʰā.bɔ̄ː.pʰít]), or formally Wat Rajabopit Sathitmahasimaram Ratchaworawihan (This is the correct official spelling in English) (Thai: วัดราชบพิธสถิตมหาสีมารามราชวรวิหาร), is a Buddhist temple on Fueang Nakhon Road, Bangkok, along Khlong Khu Mueang Doem, not far from Wat Pho and the Grand Palace. The temple was built during the reign of King Chulalongkorn (Rama V). The abbot of the temple is Somdet Phra Ariyavongsagatanana, the current Supreme Patriarch of Thailand.

== Architecture ==
=== Interior ===
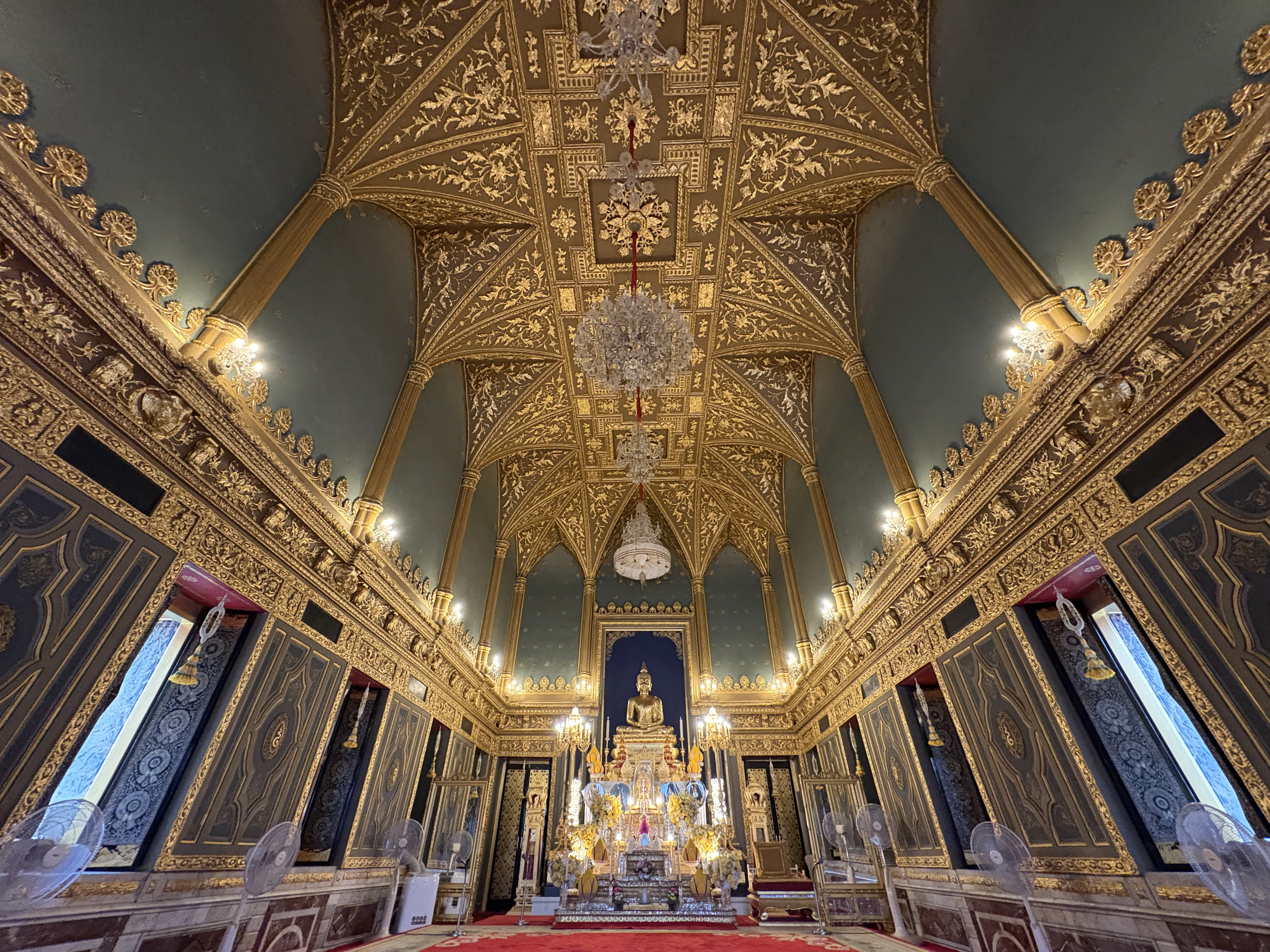
Interior of the ubosot, in Gothic revival style

The temple features a unique layout, with its wihan and ubosot joined by a circular courtyard, at the center of which stands a gilded chedi. The golden chedi (43m high) is covered with orange-coloured tiles and on top of the chedi, there is a golden ball. There is a relic of Buddha inside and the chedi was built in Sri Lankan style. The ordination hall has 10 door panels and 28 window panels each decorated with gilded black lacquer on the inside.

The interior of the temple or bot, is inspired by gilded Italian architecture that Rama V saw on a visit to Europe. The entrance doors are 3m high and are decorated with inlaid mother-of-pearl, which represents various medals and decorations. The drum tower is a two-storeyed one with hexagonal spires decorated with Benjarong ceramic nagas and Erawan heads.

=== Royal Cemetery ===
On the west end of the temple grounds is the Royal Cemetery, with numerous monuments to major and minor members of the Thai Royal Family, most notably those in the immediate family of King Chulalongkorn. One of the memorials, the Rangsi Vadhana Memorial, contains the ashes of Mahidol Adulyadej, Srinagarindra and Galyani Vadhana. The grounds include chedis and Khamer-face towers.

== List of abbots ==
No.	Portrait	Name	Tenure from	Tenure until
1		Prince Phra Arunnibhagunakorn; Acting Somdet Phra Buḍḍhācārya; (Prince Krajang Latavalya Aruṇa Mahāthera)	1869	1901
2		Somdet Phra Maha Samana Chao; Kromma Phra Jinavara Visuddhidevaryavongse; (Prince Bhujong Jombunud Sirivaḍḍhana Mahāthera)	1901	1937
3		Phra Sasanasobhon; (Pha Sae-Tae Bhāṇaka Mahāthera)	1937	1946
4		Somdet Phra Sangharaja Chao; Kromma Luang Jinavaralongkorn; (Vasana Nilprapha Vāsana Mahāthera)	1946	1988
5		Somdet Phra Buddhapabajanabodi; (Thongchuea Saimueang Cintakara Mahāthera)	1988	2008
6		Somdet Phra Ariyavongsagatanana; (Amborn Prasatthapong Ambara Mahāthera)	2008	-

== Gallery ==
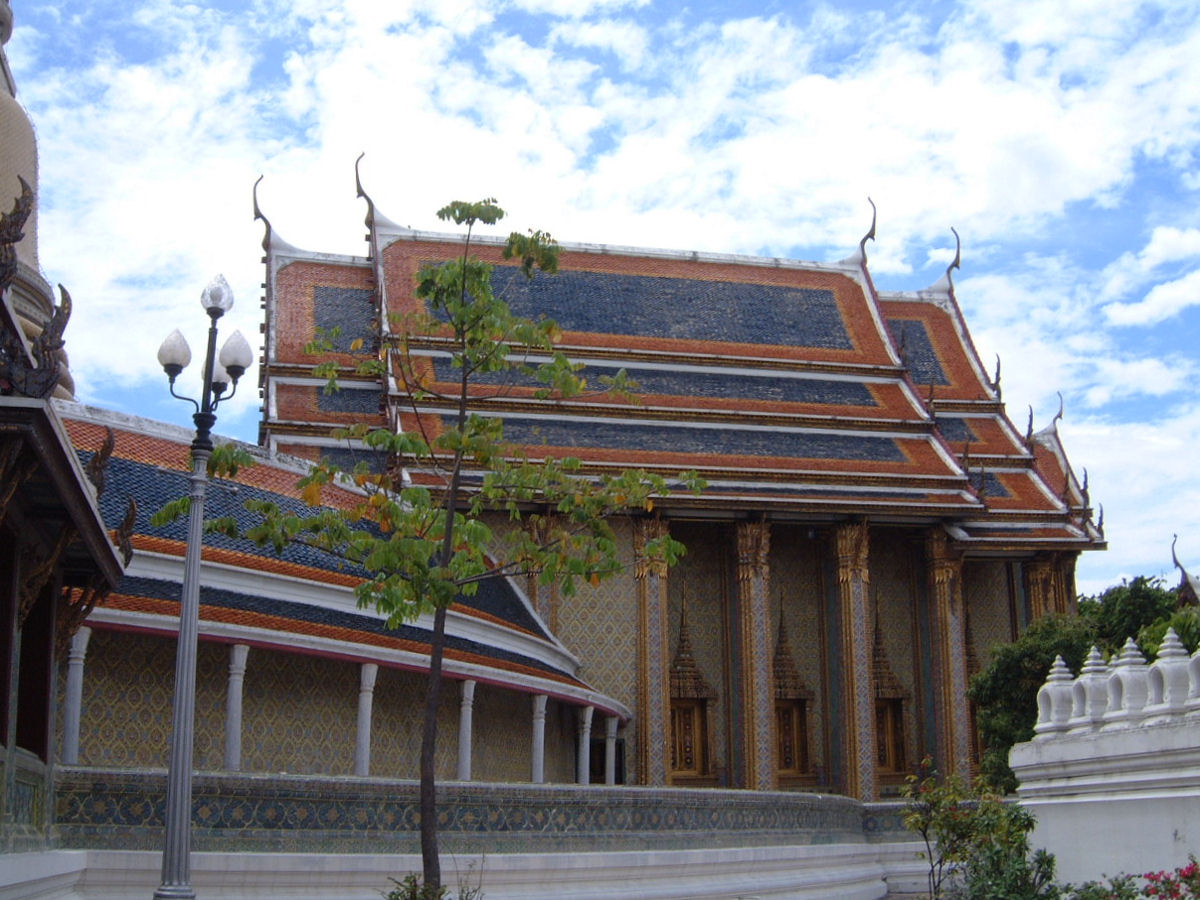
View from outside the circular cloister

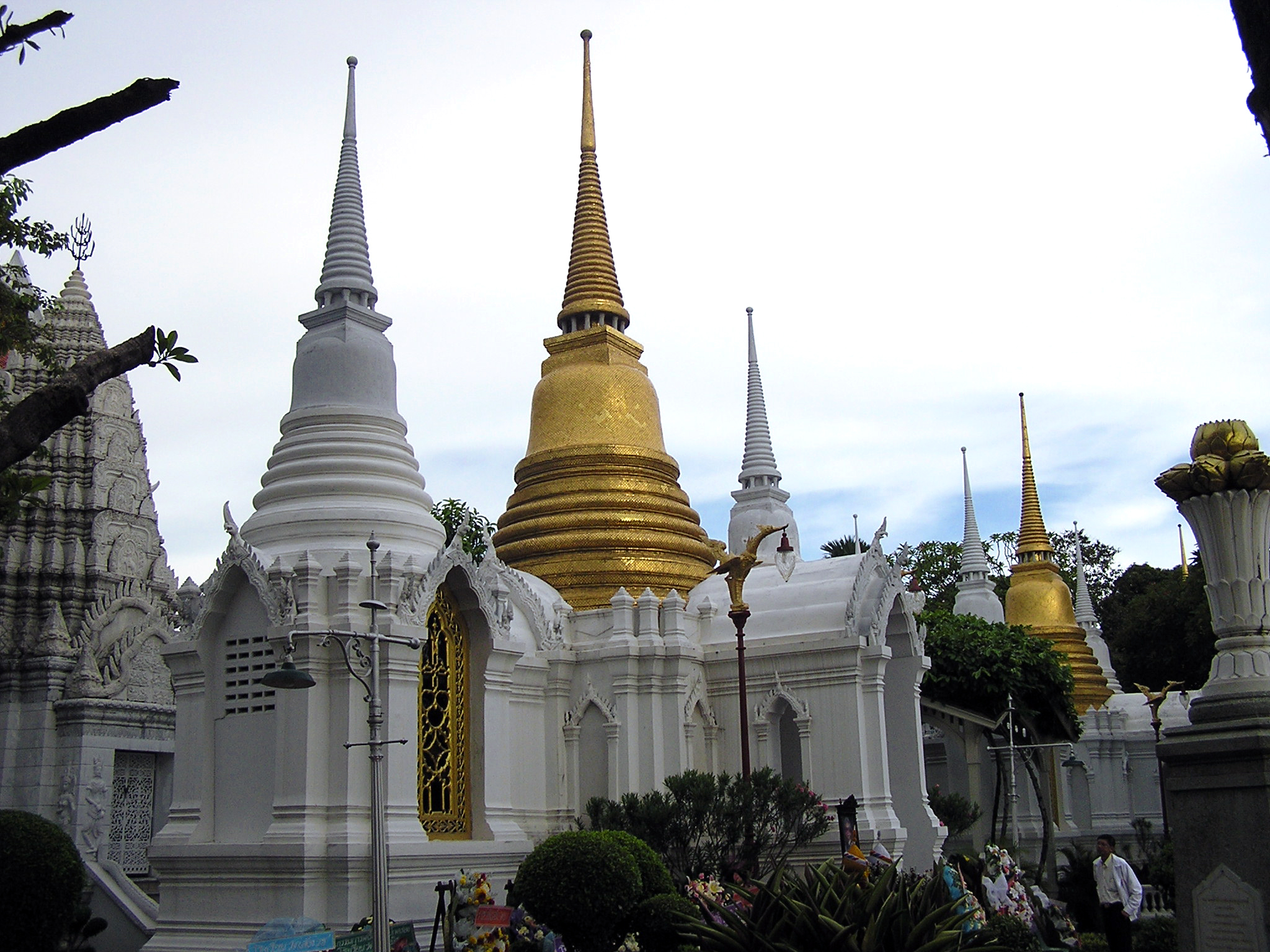
Mausoleum of Savang Vadhana

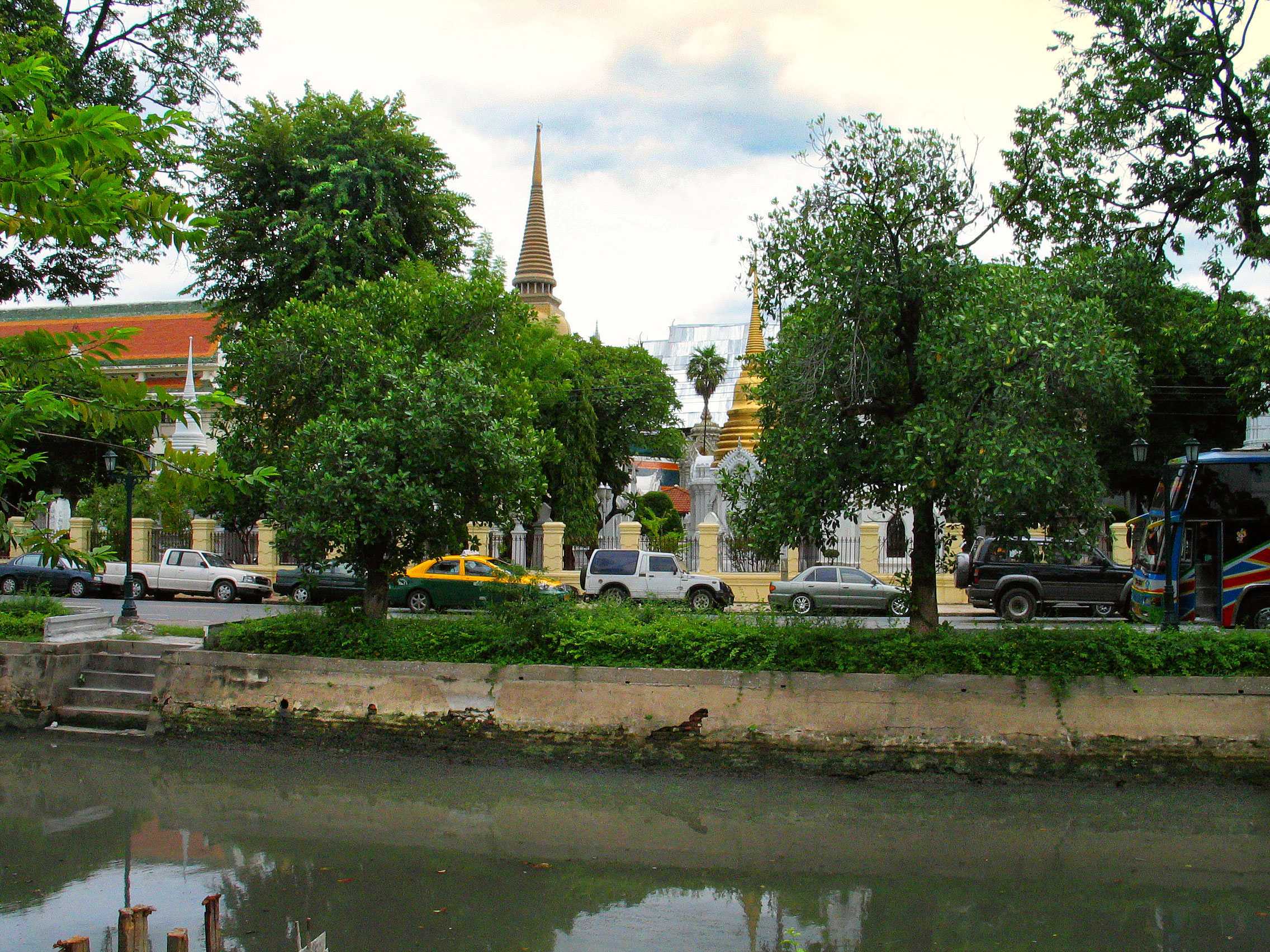
View from outside

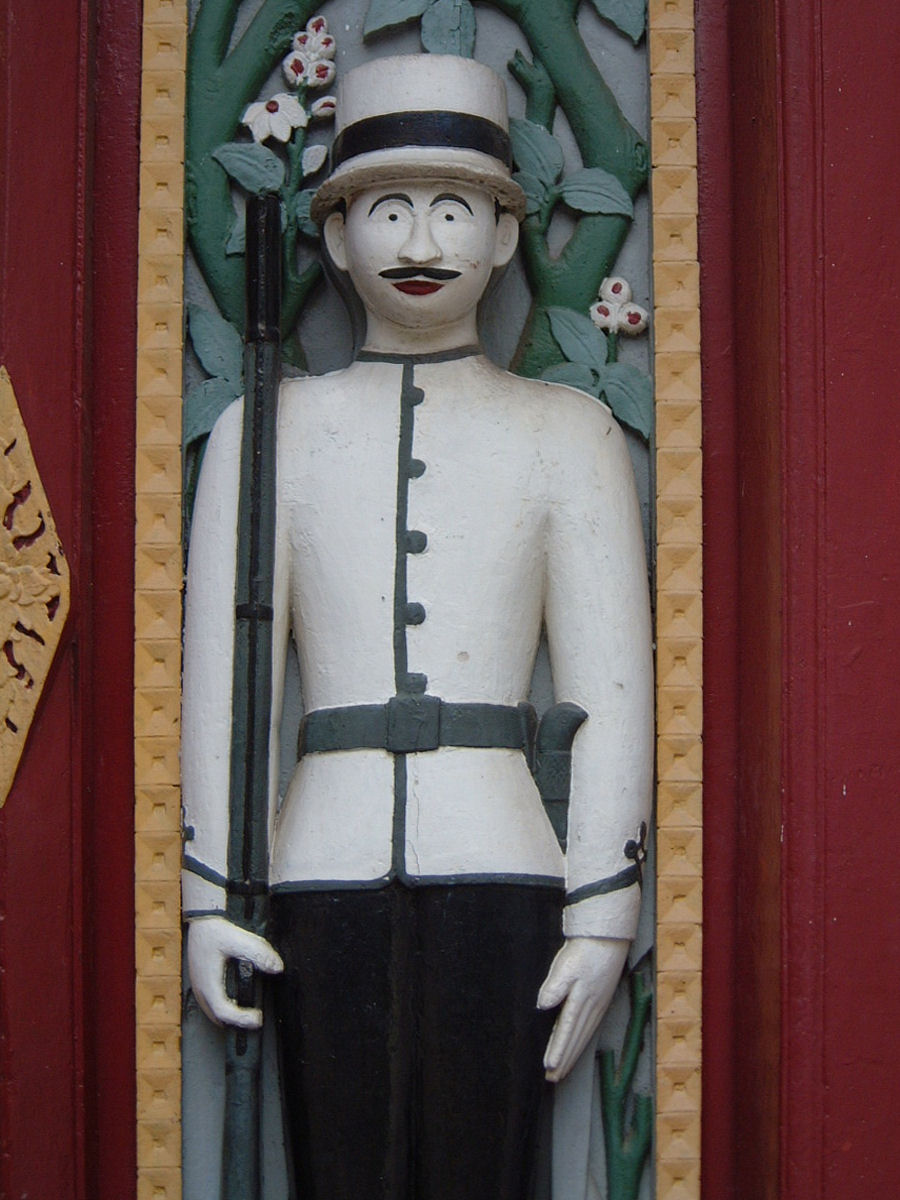
The front entrance with an image of watchman

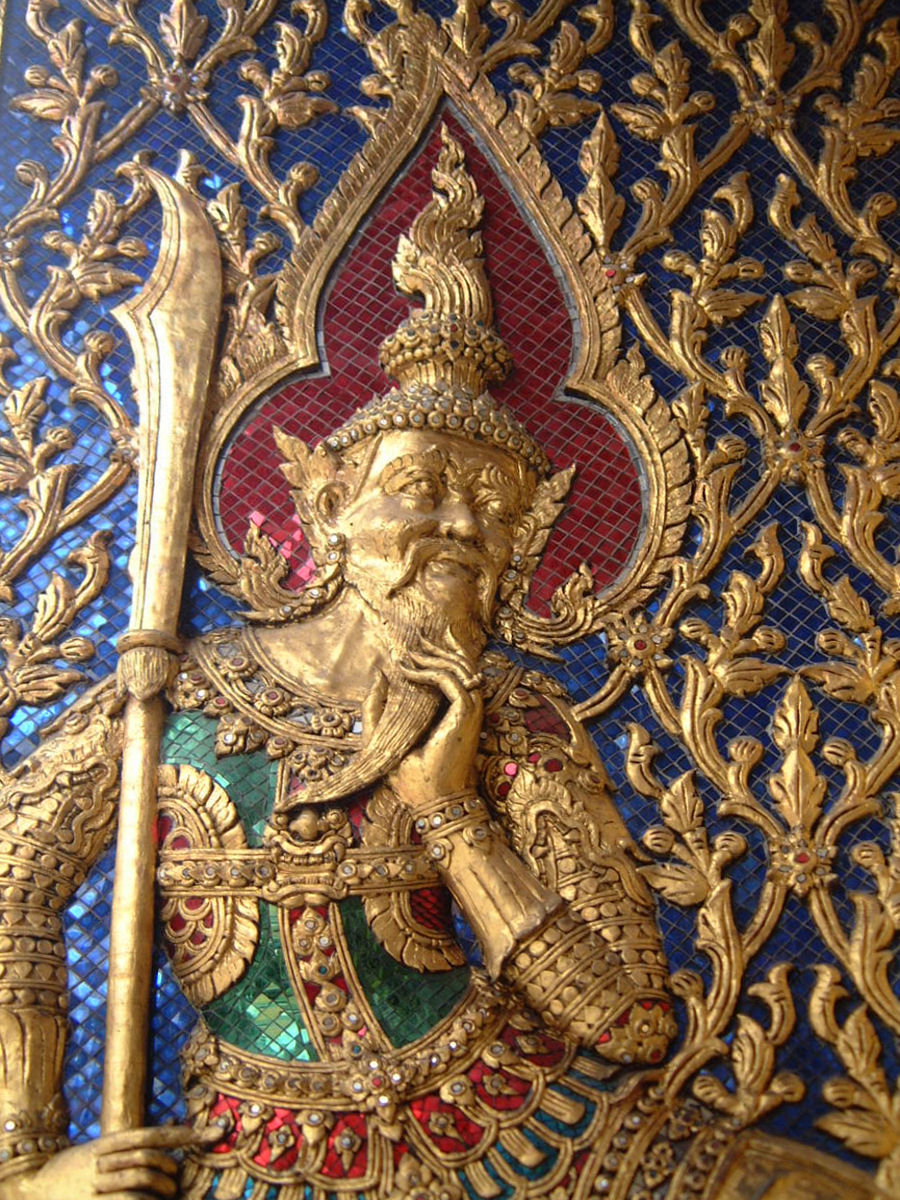
door image

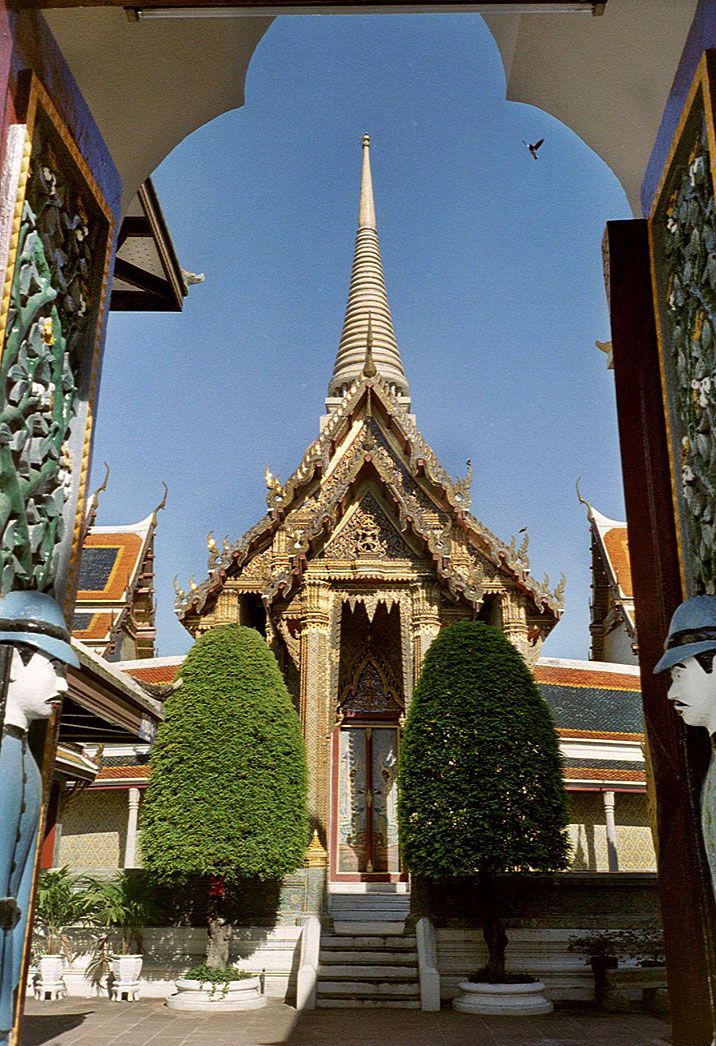
Outside view
