= Mahamakut Buddhist University =

Public Buddhist university in Thailand

Coordinates: 13°45′33″N 100°30′05″E

- มหาวิทยาลัยมหามกุฏราชวิทยาลัย
- Motto: ระเบียบ สามัคคี บำเพ็ญประโยชน์ (RTGS: Rabiap Samakkhi Bamphen Prayot
- Motto in English: Discipline, Harmony, Devotion
- Type: Buddhist autonomous public university
- Established: 1893
- Location: Salaya, Thailand
- Campus: Various, mainly in Salaya, Nakhon Pathom and Wang Noi, Ayutthaya
- Website: www.mbu.ac.th

Mahamakut Buddhist University or MBU (Thai: มหาวิทยาลัยมหามกุฏราชวิทยาลัย; RTGS: Maha Makutta Ratcha Witthayalai) is one of the two public Buddhist universities in Thailand.

== History ==
Founded in 1893 as an educational institute for monks, by King Chulalongkorn in remembrance of his late father King Mongkut. The Thai government granted the university a status of public university in 1997, integrating MBU into the Thai higher education system.

== Colleges and faculties ==
Mahamakut Buddhist University is composed of four academic faculties: Religion and Philosophy Faculty, Humanities Faculty, Social Sciences Faculty, and Education Faculty. In addition, the university also offer a teachers' training program as well as various academic services to the public.

The university began offering master's degree programs in 1987. The Ph.D. program of Buddhist Studies was established in 2005.

== See also ==
- List of Buddhist universities across the world
