= Banknotes of the Thai baht =

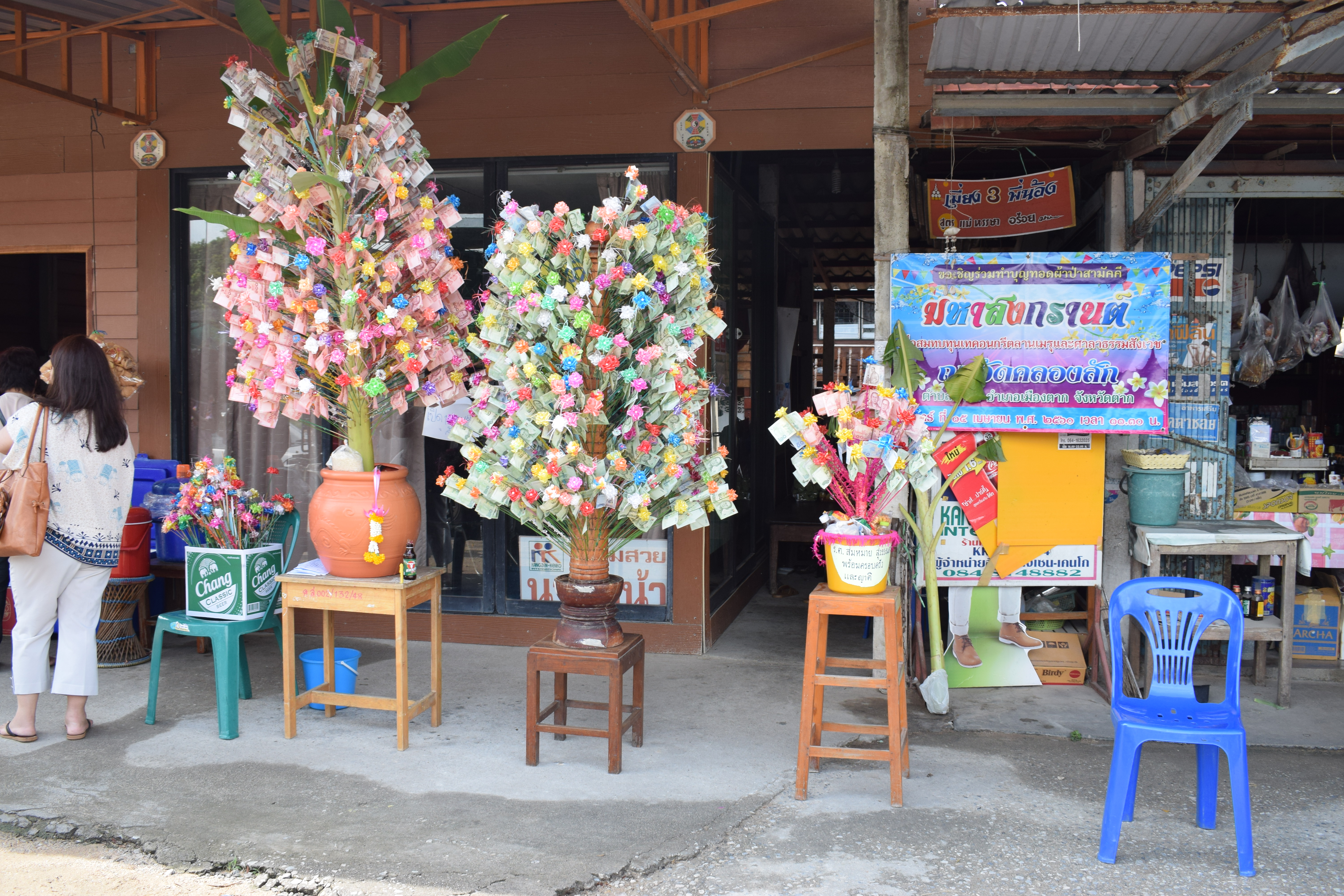
Money trees featuring Thai banknotes in Tak province

The banknotes of the Thai baht are part of the physical form of the Thai baht, Thailand's currency. The issuance of the baht banknotes is managed by the Bank of Thailand. Throughout its history, the denominations have ranged from 1 baht to 1,000 baht. The circulating banknotes today in Thailand, however, are ranged from 20 baht, 50 baht, 100 baht, 500 baht and 1000 baht. The currently circulating series are 17th, 16th and 15th series. Thai baht banknotes commonly include the portrait or the picture of the sculpture of its kings. The obverses have been designed with the current king's portrait. Whilst, in the reverses, mostly the picture of notable kings and kings with the title "the great". Some reverses feature the King Bhumibol's sayings.

== History ==
In 1851, the government issued notes for 1/8, 1/4, 3/8, 1/2, and 1 tical, followed by 3, 4, 6, and 10 tamlueng in 1853. After 1857, notes for 20 and 40 ticals were issued, also bearing their values in Straits dollars and Indian rupees. Undated notes were also issued before 1868 for 5, 7, 8, 12, and 15 tamlueng, and 1 chang. One att notes were issued in 1874.

In 1892, the treasury contracted with Giesecke & Devrient in Germany to print notes for 1, 5, 10, 40, 80, 100, 400, and 800 ticals, called "baht" in the Thai text. They were delivered to the Siamese Treasury, but never issued. Eventually the notes held in reserve were destroyed, with only a few remainders saved.

The year 1902 marked the introduction of reforms by prince Jayanta Mongkol after his observations of banking practices in Europe, which became an important landmark in the inauguration of paper money in Thailand. On September 19, 1902, the government introduced notes which were printed by Thomas De La Rue & Company Limited, England, during the reigns of Kings Rama V and Rama VI, denominated 5, 10, 20, 100, and 1000 ticals, still called baht in the Thai text — each denomination having many types, with 1 and 50 tical notes following in 1918. In 1925, notes were issued in denominations of 1, 5, 10, 20, 100, and 1,000 baht with the denomination in both Arabic and Thai numerals without English text; English speakers continued to refer to these as "ticals".

In 1942, the Bank of Thailand was founded and took over responsibility for the issuance of paper money. 50 baht notes were briefly reintroduced in 1945, with 50 satang notes issued in 1946. The one baht note was replaced by a coin in 1957 and the five baht was replaced in 1972. 50 baht notes were again reintroduced in 1985, with the 10 baht note replaced by a coin in 1988. The EURion constellation has been used on the reverse of 100 and 1000 baht notes since 2003. Older notes are occasionally still found in circulation, for example, 10 baht notes, and these can usually be spent without problem. In any case, they can be exchanged for free in banks.

== Predecimal banknotes ==
The characteristic of the banknotes of this era was that there were no series issued at the same time, rather they were issued sporadically and had multiple banks producing their own banknotes.

=== 1851–1868, Rama IV era banknotes ===
Image	Value	Written text	Value in baht	Issuing body	Date of issue
	1 fueang	เฟื้องหนึ่ง 方壹; Octava pars ticalis One eights of Tical	1/8	Royal Printing Works, Royal Palace of Siam	1853
	1 salueng	สลึงหนึ่ง 銭壹; Quartia pars ticalis One quarter of Tical	1/4	Royal Printing Works, Royal Palace of Siam	1853
	1 salueng 1 fueang	สลึงเฟื้อง 方銭壹; Tres octava partes ticalis Three eights of Tical	3/8	Royal Printing Works, Royal Palace of Siam	1853
	2 salueng	สองสลึง 銭貳; Media pars ticalis One half of Tical	1/2	Royal Printing Works, Royal Palace of Siam	1853
	2 salueng 1 fueang	สองสลึงเฟื้อง 方銭貳; Quinque octava partes ticalis Five eights of Tical	5/8	Royal Printing Works, Royal Palace of Siam	1853
	3 salueng	สามสลึง 銭參; Tres partes ticalis Three quarter of Tical	3/4	Royal Printing Works, Royal Palace of Siam	1853
	3 salueng 1 fueang	สามสลึงเฟื้อง 方銭參; Septem octava partes ticalis Seven eights of Tical	7/8	Royal Printing Works, Royal Palace of Siam	1853
	1 baht	บาทหนึ่ง 圓壹; Unus ticalis One Tical	1	Royal Printing Works, Royal Palace of Siam	1853
	2 tamlueng	พระราชทานเงินตรา สองตำงลึง	8	Royal Printing Works, Royal Palace of Siam	1856
	3 tamlueng	พระราชทานเงินตรา สามตำงลึง	12	Royal Printing Works, Royal Palace of Siam	1853; 1856
	4 tamlueng	พระราชทานเงินตรา สี่ตำงลึง	16	Royal Printing Works, Royal Palace of Siam	1853; 1856
	5 tamlueng	พระราชทานเงินตรา ห้าตำงลึง	20	Royal Printing Works, Royal Palace of Siam	1853; 1856
	6 tamlueng	พระราชทานเงินตรา หกตำงลึง	24	Royal Printing Works, Royal Palace of Siam	1856
	7 tamlueng	พระราชทานเงินตรา เจ็ดตำงลึง	28	Royal Printing Works, Royal Palace of Siam	1856
	8 tamlueng	พระราชทานเงินตรา แปดตำงลึง	32	Royal Printing Works, Royal Palace of Siam	1856
	10 tamlueng	พระราชทานเงินตรา สิบตำงลึง	40	Royal Printing Works, Royal Palace of Siam	1853; 1856
	12 tamlueng	พระราชทานเงินตรา สิบสองตำงลึง	48	Royal Printing Works, Royal Palace of Siam	1856
	15 tamlueng	พระราชทานเงินตรา สิบห้าตำงลึง	60	Royal Printing Works, Royal Palace of Siam	1856
	1 chang	พระราชทานเงินตรา ชั่งหนึ่ง	80	Royal Printing Works, Royal Palace of Siam	1853; 1856
	1 chang 5 tamlueng	พระราชทานเงินตรา ชั่งห้าตำงลึง	100	Royal Printing Works, Royal Palace of Siam	1856
	1 chang 10 tamlueng	พระราชทานเงินตรา ชั่งสิบตำงลึง	140	Royal Printing Works, Royal Palace of Siam	1856

=== 1868–1902, Rama V era banknotes ===
==== Royal Treasury banknotes ====
Image	Value	Date of issue
	1 at	1874
	1 tical	1892
	5 tical	1892
	10 tical	1892
	40 tical	1892
	80 tical	1892
	100 tical	1892
	400 tical	1892
	800 tical	1892

==== Hong Kong and Shanghai Banking Corporation (HSBC) banknotes ====
Image	Value	Date of issue
	1 tical	1889
	5 tical	1889
	10 tical	1889
	40 tical	1889
	80 tical	1889
	100 tical	1889
	400 tical	1889

==== Chartered Bank of India, Australia, and China banknotes ====
Image	Value	Date of issue
	5 tical	1884
	10 tical	1884
	40 tical	1884
	80 tical	1884
	100 tical	1884
	400 tical	1884

==== Banque de L'Indo-Chine banknotes ====
Image	Value	Date of issue
	5 tical	1986
	20 tical	1986
	80 tical	1986
	100 tical	1986

== Decimal banknotes ==
=== 1902–1925 (Series 1), Rama V and Rama VI era ===
==== Series 1 - Uniface Series ====
Series 1 was chosen due to the series which precedes this were non-decimal. Series 1 banknotes was the first series to be produced by De La Rue. In 1900, Charles James Rivett Carnac, a Royal Treasury Ministry advisor proposed that the Siamese baht followed the issuances of banknotes followed the British standard. The banknote department was established quickly thereafter. The main characteristic of this series was that the notes were one-sided and multilingual, containing Chinese, Malay (in Jawi script), and Latin scripts. It was also the last series to use the term "tical" to refer to the Thai baht and the largest in term of size of the circulated notes.

Series 1 banknotes (Rama V, VI) issued for 26 years
Value	Dimensions	Main colour	Description		Date of issue
Value	Dimensions	Main colour	Obverse	Reverse	Date of issue
1 tical	165 × 105 mm	Cyan	Emblem of Siam + รัฐบาล สยาม (Siamese Government) [date of printing] One Tical - หนึ่งบาท 暹羅國銀壹銖 - واڠ سيايم ساتو کوڤڠ	blank - no prints nor inscriptions	1918–1925
5 ticals	165 × 105 mm	Grey	Emblem of Siam + รัฐบาล สยาม (Siamese Government) [date of printing] Five Tical - ห้าบาท 暹羅國銀伍銖 - واڠ سيايم لايم کوڤڠ	blank - no prints nor inscriptions	1902–1925
10 ticals	205 × 126 mm	Brown	Emblem of Siam + รัฐบาล สยาม (Siamese Government) [date of printing] Ten Tical - สิบบาท 暹羅國銀拾銖 - واڠ سيايم سپولو کوڤڠ	blank - no prints nor inscriptions	1902–1925
20 ticals	205 × 126 mm	Green	Emblem of Siam + รัฐบาล สยาม (Siamese Government) [date of printing] Twenty Tical - ยี่สิบบาท 暹羅國銀貳拾銖 - واڠ سيايم دوا ڤولو کوڤڠ	blank - no prints nor inscriptions	1902–1925
50 ticals	165 × 105 mm	Grey	Emblem of Siam + Redacted inscriptions - overprinted to denominate 50 ticals	blank - no prints nor inscriptions	1918–1925
100 ticals	205 × 126 mm	Grey	Emblem of Siam + รัฐบาล สยาม (Siamese Government) [date of printing] Hundred Tical - ร้อยบาท 暹羅國銀壹佰銖 - واڠ سيايم سراتوس کوڤڠ	blank - no prints nor inscriptions	1903–1928
1000 ticals	205 × 126 mm	Red	Emblem of Siam + รัฐบาล สยาม (Siamese Government) [date of printing] Thousand Tical - พันบาท 暹羅國銀壹仟銖 - واڠ سيايم سريبـو کوڤڠ	blank - no prints nor inscriptions	1902–1928

=== 1925–1935 (Series 2 to Series 3 Type 1), Rama VII era ===
==== Series 2 - Ploughing Ceremony Series ====
Series 2 banknotes were produced by De La Rue.

Series 2 banknotes (Rama VII) issued for 9 years
Value	Dimensions	Main colour	Description		Date of issue
Value	Dimensions	Main colour	Obverse	Reverse	Date of issue
1 baht	135 × 75 mm	Blue and yellow	Emblem of Siam + รัฐบาล สยาม (Siamese Government) [date of printing] One Tical - หนึ่งบาท	Royal Ploughing Ceremony	1925–1934
5 baht	155 × 85 mm	Green and grey	Emblem of Siam + รัฐบาล สยาม (Siamese Government) [date of printing] Five Tical - ห้าบาท	Royal Ploughing Ceremony	1925–1934
10 baht	175 × 95 mm	Red	Emblem of Siam + รัฐบาล สยาม (Siamese Government) [date of printing] Ten Tical - สิบบาท	Royal Ploughing Ceremony	1925–1934
20 baht	175 × 95 mm	Green	Emblem of Siam + รัฐบาล สยาม (Siamese Government) [date of printing] Twenty Tical - ยี่สิบบาท	Royal Ploughing Ceremony	1925–1934
100 baht	175 × 95 mm	Blue and green	Emblem of Siam + รัฐบาล สยาม (Siamese Government) [date of printing] Hundred Tical - ร้อยบาท	Royal Ploughing Ceremony	1928–1934
1000 baht	195 × 105 mm	Red	Emblem of Siam + รัฐบาล สยาม (Siamese Government) [date of printing] Thousand Tical - พันบาท	Royal Ploughing Ceremony	1928–1934

==== Series 3 Type 1 ====
Series 3 type 1 banknotes were produced by De La Rue. This series was actually delayed due to the Siamese revolution to abolish the absolute monarchy and transform it into a constitutional monarchy. The issuance was supposed to happen in the early 1930s.

Series 3 Type 1 banknotes (Rama VII) issued for 1 years
Value	Dimensions	Main colour	Description		Date of issue
Value	Dimensions	Main colour	Obverse	Reverse	Date of issue
1 baht	135 × 75 mm	Green	King Prajadhipok and Suphannahongse Royal Barge + Emblem of Siam + รัฐบาล สยาม (Siamese Government) [date of printing] One Tical - หนึ่งบาท	Phra Samut Chedi Temple	1934–1935
5 baht	155 × 85 mm	Green and grey	King Prajadhipok and Temple of the Emerald Buddha + Emblem of Siam + รัฐบาล สยาม (Siamese Government) [date of printing] Five Tical - ห้าบาท	Phra Samut Chedi Temple	1934–1935
10 baht	175 × 95 mm	Brown	King Prajadhipok and a scene of the Mae Ping River + Emblem of Siam + รัฐบาล สยาม (Siamese Government) [date of printing] Ten Tical - สิบบาท	Phra Samut Chedi Temple	1934–1935
20 baht	175 × 95 mm	Green	King Prajadhipok and a scene of a riverside community + Emblem of Siam + รัฐบาล สยาม (Siamese Government) [date of printing] Twenty Tical - ยี่สิบบาท	Phra Samut Chedi Temple	1934–1935

=== 1935–1948 (Series 3 Type 2 to Series 8), Rama VIII era ===
==== Series 3 Type 2 ====
Series 3 type 2 banknotes were produced by De La Rue. It was the first series to hold King Rama VIII's portrait, which replaced King Rama VII's portrait in the type 1.

Series 3 Type 2 banknotes (Rama VIII) issued for 2 years
Value	Dimensions	Main colour	Description		Date of issue
Value	Dimensions	Main colour	Obverse	Reverse	Date of issue
1 baht	135 × 75 mm	Green	Young King Ananda Mahidol and Suphannahongse Royal Barge + Emblem of Siam + รัฐบาล สยาม (Siamese Government) [date of printing] One Tical - หนึ่งบาท	Phra Samut Chedi Temple + โทษฐานปลอมหรือแปลงธนบัตรคือจำคุกตั้งแต่สิบปีถึงตลอดชีวิต และปรับตั้งแต่พันบาทถึงหมื่นบาทหรือพันเท่าราคาธนบัตร ปลอมแล้วแต่จำนวนไหนจะมากกว่ากัน (Penalty for counterfeiting the banknote is ten years up to life imprisonment, and fined thousand up to ten thousands Baht or thousand times of that counterfeited notes depends on which is higher.)	1935–1937
5 baht	155 × 85 mm	Green and grey	Young King Ananda Mahidol and Temple of the Emerald Buddha + Emblem of Siam + รัฐบาล สยาม (Siamese Government) [date of printing] Five Tical - ห้าบาท	Phra Samut Chedi Temple + โทษฐานปลอมหรือแปลงธนบัตรคือจำคุกตั้งแต่สิบปีถึงตลอดชีวิต และปรับตั้งแต่พันบาทถึงหมื่นบาทหรือพันเท่าราคาธนบัตร ปลอมแล้วแต่จำนวนไหนจะมากกว่ากัน (Penalty for counterfeiting the banknote is ten years up to life imprisonment, and fined thousand up to ten thousands Baht or thousand times of that counterfeited notes depends on which is higher.)	1935–1937
10 baht	175 × 95 mm	Brown	Young King Ananda Mahidol and a scene of the Mae Ping River + Emblem of Siam + รัฐบาล สยาม (Siamese Government) [date of printing] Ten Tical - สิบบาท	Phra Samut Chedi Temple + โทษฐานปลอมหรือแปลงธนบัตรคือจำคุกตั้งแต่สิบปีถึงตลอดชีวิต และปรับตั้งแต่พันบาทถึงหมื่นบาทหรือพันเท่าราคาธนบัตร ปลอมแล้วแต่จำนวนไหนจะมากกว่ากัน (Penalty for counterfeiting the banknote is ten years up to life imprisonment, and fined thousand up to ten thousands Baht or thousand times of that counterfeited notes depends on which is higher.)	1935–1937
20 baht	175 × 95 mm	Green	Young King Ananda Mahidol and a scene of a riverside community + Emblem of Siam + รัฐบาล สยาม (Siamese Government) [date of printing] Twenty Tical - ยี่สิบบาท	Phra Samut Chedi Temple + โทษฐานปลอมหรือแปลงธนบัตรคือจำคุกตั้งแต่สิบปีถึงตลอดชีวิต และปรับตั้งแต่พันบาทถึงหมื่นบาทหรือพันเท่าราคาธนบัตร ปลอมแล้วแต่จำนวนไหนจะมากกว่ากัน (Penalty for counterfeiting the banknote is ten years up to life imprisonment, and fined thousand up to ten thousands Baht or thousand times of that counterfeited notes depends on which is higher.)	1935–1937

==== Series 4 Type 1 ====
Series 4 type 1 banknotes were produced by Thomas De La Rue & Company Limited.

Series 4 Type 1 banknotes (Rama VIII) issued for 5 years
Value	Dimensions	Main colour	Description		Date of issue
Value	Dimensions	Main colour	Obverse	Reverse	Date of issue
1 baht	125 × 65 mm	Green	Young King Ananda Mahidol and Phra Samut Chedi	Ananta Samakhom Throne Hall	1937–1942
5 baht	135 × 76 mm	Green and grey	Young King Ananda Mahidol and Phra Pathom Chedi	Ananta Samakhom Throne Hall	1937–1942
10 baht	145 × 87 mm	Brown	Young King Ananda Mahidol and Mahakarn Fortress	Ananta Samakhom Throne Hall	1937–1942
20 baht	145 × 87 mm	Green	Young King Ananda Mahidol and Golden Mountain Stupa	Ananta Samakhom Throne Hall	1937–1942
1000 baht	195 × 100 mm	Red	Young King Ananda Mahidol and a Dusidabhirom Pavilion	Ananta Samakhom Throne Hall	1937–1942

==== Series 4 Type 2 - Survey Department Series ====
Series 4 type 2 banknotes were produced by Royal Thai Survey Department and the Naval Hydrographic Department. During World War II, Thailand was allied with the Empire of Japan. This meant that the government of Thailand could not order banknotes from the British De La Rue.

Series Type II banknotes (Rama VIII) issued for <1 years
Value	Dimensions	Main colour	Description		Date of issue
Value	Dimensions	Main colour	Obverse	Reverse	Date of issue
1 baht	125 × 65 mm	Green	Young King Ananda Mahidol and Phra Samut Chedi	Ananta Samakhom Throne Hall	1942
10 baht	146 × 86 mm	Brown	Young King Ananda Mahidol and Mahakarn Fortress	Ananta Samakhom Throne Hall	1942
20 baht	146 × 86 mm	Green	Young King Ananda Mahidol and Grand Palace	Ananta Samakhom Throne Hall	1942
100 baht	125 × 65 mm	Cyan	Young King Ananda Mahidol and a Wat Arun	Ananta Samakhom Throne Hall	1942

==== Series 5 ====
Series 5 banknotes were produced by Notes Printing Works of Japan.

Series 5 banknotes (Rama VIII) issued for 3 years
Value	Dimensions	Main colour	Description		Date of issue
Value	Dimensions	Main colour	Obverse	Reverse	Date of issue
50 satang	117 × 63 mm	Green	Young King Ananda Mahidol	Grand Palace	1942–1945
1 baht	125 × 65 mm	Grey	Young King Ananda Mahidol and Pumin Temple	Grand Palace	1942–1945
5 baht	135 × 75 mm	Green	Young King Ananda Mahidol and Wat Benchamabophit Dusitwanaram	Grand Palace	1942–1945
10 baht	145 × 85 mm	Green	Young King Ananda Mahidol and Wat Pho	Grand Palace	1942–1945
20 baht	155 × 90 mm	Green	Young King Ananda Mahidol and Aisawan Tipaya-ast Pavilion	Grand Palace	1942–1945
100 baht	175 × 100 mm	Red	Young King Ananda Mahidol and Wat Arun	Grand Palace	1942–1945
1000 baht	175 × 100 mm	Green	Young King Ananda Mahidol and Grand Palace	Grand Palace	1942–1945

==== Series 6 ====
Series 6 banknotes were produced by Royal Thai Survey Department.

Series 6 banknotes (Rama VIII) issued for <1 years
Value	Dimensions	Main colour	Description		Date of issue
Value	Dimensions	Main colour	Obverse	Reverse	Date of issue
20 baht	147 × 87 mm	Green	Young King Ananda Mahidol and Dusidapirom Pavilion	Ananta Samakhom Throne Hall	1945
100 baht	147 × 87 mm	Green	Young King Ananda Mahidol and Wat Arun	Ananta Samakhom Throne Hall	1945

==== Series 7 ====
Series 7 banknotes relied on private printing under the supervision of the Bank of Thailand. According to the Bank of Thailand, the quality of this series was barely satisfactory.

Series 7 banknotes (Rama VIII) issued for <1 years
Value	Dimensions	Main colour	Description		Date of issue
Value	Dimensions	Main colour	Obverse	Reverse	Date of issue
1 baht	104 × 54 mm	Cyan	King Ananda Mahidol and Phra Samut Chedi	Ananta Samakhom Throne Hall	1945
5 baht	135 × 76 mm	Purple	King Ananda Mahidol and Phra Patom Chedi	Ananta Samakhom Throne Hall	1945
10 baht	135 × 76 mm	Green	King Ananda Mahidol and Mahakarn Fortress	Ananta Samakhom Throne Hall	1945
50 baht	104 × 54 mm	Red	King Ananda Mahidol and Wat Benchamabophit Dusitwanaram	Ananta Samakhom Throne Hall	1945

==== Special series ====
The special series were banknotes that were issued during World War II, each at different times.

Special series banknotes (Rama VIII) issued for <1 years
Value	Dimensions	Main colour	Description		Date of issue
Value	Dimensions	Main colour	Obverse	Reverse	Date of issue
50 satang (overprint)	145 × 85 mm	Grey	Young King Ananda Mahidol and Wat Pho	Grand Palace	1946
50 satang (Kong Tek Note)	125 × 65 mm	Grey and yellow	none	Ananta Samakhom Throne Hall	1946
1 baht (Kong Tek Note)	117 × 63 mm	Grey and red	King Ananda Mahidol and a 16-pointed star symbol	Ananta Samakhom Throne Hall	1942
1 baht (Invasion Note)	114 × 73 mm	Grey	none		1946
1000 baht	195 × 105 mm	Red	King Ananda Mahidol and Phra Prang Sam Yod	Ananta Samakhom Throne Hall	1943

==== Series 8 - American Series ====
At the end of World War II, the English De La Rue's printing house suffered damage from German bombing, thus the Royal Thai Government turned to the United States government to produce the series 8. The Tudor Press Company produced this series.

Series 8 banknotes (Rama VIII) issued for 3 years
Value	Dimensions	Main colour	Description		Date of issue
Value	Dimensions	Main colour	Obverse	Reverse	Date of issue
1 baht	110 × 66 mm	Green	King Ananda Mahidol and Phra Patom Chedi	The Constitution of Siam	1945–1948
5 baht	110 × 66 mm	Blue	King Ananda Mahidol and Phra Patom Chedi	The Constitution of Siam	1945–1948
10 baht	110 × 66 mm	Brown	King Ananda Mahidol and Phra Patom Chedi	The Constitution of Siam	1945–1948
20 baht	156 × 90 mm	Violet	King Ananda Mahidol and Phra Patom Chedi	The Constitution of Siam	1945–1948
100 baht	156 × 90 mm	Brown and cyan	King Ananda Mahidol and Phra Patom Chedi	The Constitution of Siam	1945–1948

=== 1948–2003 (Series 9 to Series 13), early Rama IX era ===
These banknotes series are not yet demonetised and hence still legal tender, though they are never seen in circulation anymore.

These banknotes images are allowed under a strict copyright infringement exemption under the Chapter 1: Copyright, Part 6: Exceptions to Infringement of Copyright, Clause 7 of Copyright Act B.E. 2537 (1994) Amended by Copyright Act (NO. 2) B.E. 2558 (2015), and Copyright Act (NO.3) B.E. 2558 (2015) and Copyright Act (NO.4) B.E. 2561 (2018): reproduction, adaptation in part of a work or abridgement or making a summary by a teacher or an educational institution so as to distribute or sell to students in a class or in an educational institution, provided that the act is not for profit.

So as to serve as an educational material, any series beyond series 11 is omitted.

==== Series 9 ====
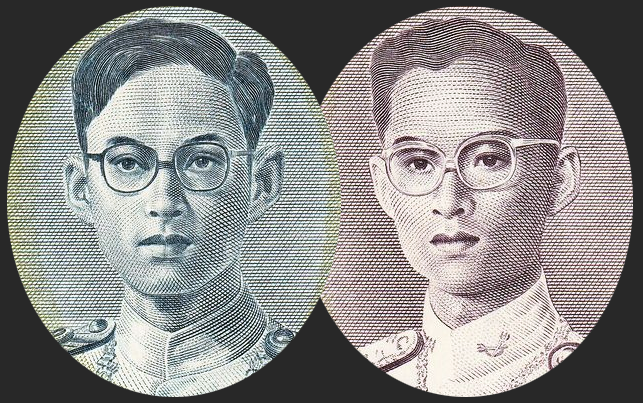
The two different King Rama IX portrait types on Series 9 banknotes

Series 9 banknotes were produced by the English De La Rue. There are two variations of King Bhumibol Adulyadej's portrait within this series. According to the Bank of Thailand, the colour schemes of this series established the denominations' colours for all of the following series due to the series circulating for 20 years.

Series 9 banknotes (Rama IX) issued for 23 years
Value	Dimensions	Main colour	Description		Date of issue
Value	Dimensions	Main colour	Obverse	Reverse	Date of issue
50 satang	115 × 63 mm	Green	The Constitution of Thailand	Phra Samut Chedi	1948–1969
1 baht	126 × 66 mm	Green	King Bhumibol Adulyadej in the uniform of the supreme commander of the Royal Thai Armed Forces, and Wat Pho	Ananta Samakhom Throne Hall	1948–1955; 1955–1969
5 baht	136 × 77 mm	Green and Grey	King Bhumibol Adulyadej in the uniform of the supreme commander of the Royal Thai Armed Forces, and Phra Pathomma Chedi	Ananta Samakhom Throne Hall	1948–1955; 1955–1969
10 baht	146 × 86 mm	Brown	King Bhumibol Adulyadej in the uniform of the supreme commander of the Royal Thai Armed Forces, and Pharakarn Fortress	Ananta Samakhom Throne Hall	1948–1953; 1953–1969
20 baht	146 × 86 mm	Green	King Bhumibol Adulyadej in the uniform of the supreme commander of the Royal Thai Armed Forces, and Grand Palace	Ananta Samakhom Throne Hall	1948–1955; 1955–1971
100 baht	145 × 86 mm	Red	King Bhumibol Adulyadej in the uniform of the supreme commander of the Royal Thai Armed Forces, and Wat Arun	Ananta Samakhom Throne Hall	1948–1955; 1955–1968

==== Series 10 ====
Series 10 banknotes were produced the English De La Rue. Due to heavy counterfeiting, series 10 was issued in series 9's stead. The 100-baht note is the only denomination issued in this series.

Series 10 banknotes (Rama IX) issued for <1 years
Value	Dimensions	Main colour	Description		Date of issue
Value	Dimensions	Main colour	Obverse	Reverse	Date of issue
100 baht	145 × 86 mm	Red	King Bhumibol Adulyadej in uniform	Royal barge Suphannahong	1968–1969

==== Series 11 ====
In this series, the 500-baht note was introduced for the first time ever. This coincided with the Bank of Thailand fully converting to an in-house production. As a consequence, the 1-baht note's production was cancelled.

Series 11 banknotes (Rama IX) issued for 13 years
Value	Dimensions	Main colour	Description		Date of issue
Value	Dimensions	Main colour	Obverse	Reverse	Date of issue
5 baht	130 × 67.5 mm	Violet	King Bhumibol Adulyadej in full regalia	Arphonphimoke Prasat Pavilion	1969–1978
10 baht	135 × 70 mm	Brown	King Bhumibol Adulyadej in full regalia	Wat Benchamabophit	1969–1978
20 baht	140 × 72 mm	Green	King Bhumibol Adulyadej in full regalia	Royal barge Anantanakkharat with the Grand Palace in the background	1971–1978
100 baht	150 × 77 mm	Red	King Bhumibol Adulyadej in full regalia	Wat Phra Si Rattana Satsadaram at the Grand Palace	1969–1978
500 baht	160 × 80 mm	Purple	King Bhumibol Adulyadej in full regalia	Phra Prang Sam Yod in Lopburi	1975–1988

==== Series 12 - The Greats Series and 13 - Bicentenial Series ====
Series 12 and 13 aimed to glorify past Thai monarchs, the Bank of Thailand dubbed this as "The Great Series." The 5-baht note's production was cancelled. The 50-baht and 500-baht notes are part of series 13 and were issued to commemorate the bicentennial celebration of Bangkok in 1982, though their production had to be delayed for the new printing press to be installed.

Series 12 & 13 banknotes (Rama IX) issued for 25 years
Value	Dimensions	Main colour	Description		Date of issue
Value	Dimensions	Main colour	Obverse	Reverse	Date of issue
10 baht	132 × 69 mm	Brown	King Bhumibol Adulyadej in uniform	Equestrian statue of King Chulalongkorn at Ananta Samakhom Throne Hall	1978–2003
20 baht	139 × 72 mm	Green	King Bhumibol Adulyadej in uniform	King Taksin's statue at Chantaburi, along with his generals: Phraya Phichai of the broken sword, Phra Chiang-ngeon, Luang Ratchasaneha, Luang Phromsena	1978–2003
50 baht	144 × 72 mm	Blue	King Bhumibol Adulyadej in full regalia	Ananta Samakhom Throne Hall, the coronation of King Prajadhipok (Rama VII)	1985–1996
50 baht (polymer)	144 × 72 mm	Blue and yellow	King Bhumibol Adulyadej in full regalia	Ananta Samakhom Throne Hall, the coronation of King Prajadhipok (Rama VII)	1996–1997
100 baht	154 × 80 mm	Red	King Bhumibol Adulyadej in uniform	King Naresuan the Great atop his war elephant, monument at Donchedi, Suphanburi.	1978–1994
500 baht	160 × 80 mm	Purple	King Bhumibol Adulyadej in the uniform of the supreme commander of the Royal Thai Armed Forces	Monument of King Phutthayotfa Chulalok; Memorial Bridge and the Temple of the Emerald Buddha	1988–1996

=== 2003–present (Series 14 to Series 17), late Rama IX and Rama X era ===
Some images of banknotes have been removed lest they infringe copyright, but may be viewed at the Thai-language article linked in the margin.

==== Series 14 ====
The series 14 aims to focus on the activities and contributions of the Chakri kings. Officially, only three notes were issued, but the 50-baht notes were also produced alongside this series. The polymer 50-baht is considered to be a part of series 15, even though the production date began in 1994.

Series 14 banknotes (Rama IX) issued for 13 years
Value	Dimensions	Main colour	Description		Date of issue
Value	Dimensions	Main colour	Obverse	Reverse	Date of issue
50 baht (polymer)	144 × 72 mm	Blue	King Bhumibol Adulyadej (Rama IX) in the uniform of the supreme commander of the Royal Thai Armed Forces	King Mongkut (Rama IV); Phra Pathom Chedi; a telescope, and a celestial globe	1994–2004
100 baht	150 × 72 mm	Red	King Bhumibol Adulyadej (Rama IX) in the uniform of the supreme commander of the Royal Thai Armed Forces	King Chulalongkorn (Rama V) and King Vajiravudh (Rama VI); Chulalongkorn University; Modern Thai school with school children, and book with candle emitting light; Ancient Thai education with a Buddhist monk	1994–2004
500 baht	156 × 72 mm	Purple	King Bhumibol Adulyadej (Rama IX) in the uniform of the supreme commander of the Royal Thai Armed Forces	King Phutthayotfa Chulalok (Rama I) and King Phutthaloetla Naphalai (Rama II); Emerald Buddha Temple; Khon Theatre scene from the Ramayana story	1996–2001
1,000 baht	166 × 80 mm	Silver	King Bhumibol Adulyadej (Rama IX) in the uniform of the supreme commander of the Royal Thai Armed Forces	King Bhumibol Adulyadej (Rama IX) and Queen Sirikit; Royal Visit to the Baan Bakong reservoir in Narathiwat, smaller images of greeting the local children.	1992–2005

==== Series 15 ====
The series 15 aims to update and expand the previous series 14's design. The 1000-baht note was resized down. There are two variants of this series, with the second and later variant having updated security features.

Series 15 banknotes (Rama IX) issued for 10 years
Value	Dimensions	Main colour	Description		Date of issue
Value	Dimensions	Main colour	Obverse	Reverse	Date of issue
20 baht	138 × 72 mm	Green	King Bhumibol Adulyadej (Rama IX) in the uniform of the supreme commander of the Royal Thai Armed Forces	King Ananda Mahidol (Rama VIII); Procession at Sampheng Lane (Chinatown, Bangkok) after WWII with King Rama VIII Ananda Mahidol and Prince Bhumibol Adulyadej (later King Rama IX); Rama IX Bridge	3 March 2003
50 baht	144 × 72 mm	Blue	King Bhumibol Adulyadej (Rama IX) in the uniform of the supreme commander of the Royal Thai Armed Forces	King Mongkut (Rama IV); Phra Pathom Chedi; a telescope, and a celestial globe	19 March 2004
100 baht	150 × 72 mm	Red	King Bhumibol Adulyadej (Rama IX) in the uniform of the supreme commander of the Royal Thai Armed Forces	Type I King Chulalongkorn (Rama V) and King Vajiravudh (Rama VI); Chulalongkorn University; Modern Thai school with school children, and book with candle emitting light; Ancient Thai education with a Buddhist monk	2004
100 baht	150 × 72 mm	Red	King Bhumibol Adulyadej (Rama IX) in the uniform of the supreme commander of the Royal Thai Armed Forces	Type II King Chulalongkorn (Rama V) ; fresco painting on the ceiling of southern dome inside Ananta Samakhom Throne Hall showing Abolition of slavery, painted by Galileo Chini and Carlo Riguli	21 October 2005
500 baht	156 × 72 mm	Purple	King Bhumibol Adulyadej (Rama IX) in the uniform of the supreme commander of the Royal Thai Armed Forces	King Nangklao (Rama III); Loha Prasat at Wat Ratchanatdaram temple; a Chinese junk to depict trading with foreign nations	1 August 2001
1,000 baht	162 × 72 mm	Brown	King Bhumibol Adulyadej (Rama IX) in the uniform of the supreme commander of the Royal Thai Armed Forces	King Bhumibol Adulyadej (Rama IX); Pa Sak Jolasid Dam; an image of the agricultural land managed in accordance with the New Theory	25 November 2005

==== Series 16 ====
Similar to the series 15, the series 16 banknotes update the design to include a more later portrait of King Rama IX. There are two variants of this series, the later one being a circulated commemorative series circulating for a year after King Rama IX's passing. The series 16–2 notes depict the life and achievements of King Rama IX on the reverse.

Series 16 banknotes (Rama IX) issued for 6 years
Value	Dimensions	Main colour	Description		Date of issue
Value	Dimensions	Main colour	Obverse	Reverse	Date of issue
20 baht	138 × 72 mm	Green	King Bhumibol Adulyadej in the Royal House of Chakri gown	King Ramkhamhaeng the Great on the Manangkhasila Asana Throne monument; invention of the Thai script; Ramkhamhaeng stele	1 April 2013
50 baht	144 × 72 mm	Blue	King Bhumibol Adulyadej in the Royal House of Chakri gown	King Naresuan the Great pouring water for declaration of independence monument; Statue of King Naresuan the Great on war elephant; Phra Chedi Chai Mongkol temple	18 January 2012
100 baht	150 × 72 mm	Red	King Bhumibol Adulyadej in the Royal House of Chakri gown	King Taksin the Great monument in Wongwian Yai circle; Phra Ratchawang Doem (King Taksin's palace); Wichai Prasit Fortress Thonburi	26 February 2015
500 baht	156 × 72 mm	Violet	King Bhumibol Adulyadej in the Royal House of Chakri gown	King Phutthayotfa Chulalok the Great (Rama I) monument; Wat Phra Chetuphon Vimolmangklararm Rajwaramahaviharn (Wat Pho); Phra Sumen Fort (Bangkok city wall)	12 May 2014
1,000 baht	162 × 72 mm	Brown	King Bhumibol Adulyadej in the Royal House of Chakri gown	King Chulalongkorn the Great (Rama V) monument; Ananta Samakhom throne hall, Dusit palace ground king's monument, end of slavery in Siam	21 August 2015

== 15th series ==
Bank notes of this series were issued throughout the year 2003 – 2005. Although becoming increasingly uncommon, they can still be seen and used as usual.

15th series banknotes
Value	Dimensions	Main colour	Description		Date of issue
Value	Dimensions	Main colour	Obverse	Reverse	Date of issue
20 baht	138 × 72 mm	Green	King Bhumibol Adulyadej (1927–2016) in the uniform of the Supreme head of the armed forces	King Ananda Mahidol (1925–1946), and his visiting Sampheng with King Bhumibol, Rama VIII Bridge	3 March 2003
50 baht	144 × 72 mm	Blue	King Bhumibol Adulyadej (1927–2016) in the uniform of the Supreme head of the armed forces	King Mongkut (1804–1868), astronomical tools, Phra Pathom Chedi	18 August 1997 (polymer) and 1 October 2004 (paper)
100 baht	150 × 72 mm	Red	King Bhumibol Adulyadej (1927–2016) in the uniform of the Supreme head of the armed forces	Type I: The statue of King Chulalongkorn and King Vajiravudh at the Chulalongkorn University; Type II: King Chulalongkorn (1853–1910) and the abolition of slavery in Thailand	25 November 2004 (Type I) and 21 October 2005 (Type II)
500 baht	156 × 72 mm	Purple	King Bhumibol Adulyadej (1927–2016) in the uniform of the Supreme head of the armed forces	Statue of King Nangklao (1788–1851) at Laan Phlub Phla Maha Jedsada Bodin, Loha Prasat at Wat Ratchanatdaram	3 August 2001
1,000 baht	162 × 72 mm	Brown	King Bhumibol Adulyadej (1927–2016) in the uniform of the Supreme head of the armed forces	King Bhumibol Adulyadej, Pa Sak Jolasid Dam	1 November 1999 (without holographic strip) and 25 November 2005 (with holographic strip)

== 16th series ==
16th series banknotes
Value	Dimensions	Main colour	Description		Date of issue
Value	Dimensions	Main colour	Obverse	Reverse	Date of issue
20 baht	138 × 72 mm	Green	King Bhumibol Adulyadej in the Royal House of Chakri gown	King Ram Khamhaeng (1247–1298) on the Manangkhasila Asana Throne monument, invention of the Thai script, Ramkhamhaeng stele	1 April 2013
50 baht	144 × 72 mm	Blue	King Bhumibol Adulyadej in the Royal House of Chakri gown	King Naresuan (1555–1605) pouring water for declaration of independence monument, King Naresuan during the Great on war elephant, Phra Chedi Chai Mongkol	18 January 2012
100 baht	150 × 72 mm	Red	King Bhumibol Adulyadej in the Royal House of Chakri gown	King Taksin the Great (1734–1782) monument at the Wongwian Yai circle, Thonburi palace, Wi Chai Prasit Fortress	26 February 2015
500 baht	156 × 72 mm	Violet	King Bhumibol Adulyadej in the Royal House of Chakri gown	King Buddha Yodfa Chulalok (1737–1809) monument at the Saphan Phut, Chedis at Wat Pho, Phra Sumen Fort	12 May 2014
1,000 baht	162 × 72 mm	Brown	King Bhumibol Adulyadej in the Royal House of Chakri gown	King Chulalongkron, the Great, the Equestrian statue of King Chulalongkorn at the Royal Plaza, Ananta Samakhom Throne Hall, end-of-slavery declaration of Siam	21 August 2015

=== 16th series (special) ===
In 2016, after the passing of King Bhumibol, the Bank of Thailand issued the special series "The tribute to the great King Bhumibol". The reverses are replaced with the portrait of King Bhumibol through his life. The banknotes were rare at the first time being issued. As of 2018, however, the bills are commonly found and circulated in Thailand. Some Thais even mistakenly thought these were the new permanent series of banknotes.

16th series banknotes (special)
Value	Dimensions	Main colour	Description		Date of issue
Value	Dimensions	Main colour	Obverse	Reverse	Date of issue
20 baht	138 × 72 mm	Green	King Bhumibol Adulyadej in the Royal House of Chakri gown	Young prince Bhumibol in Lausanne Switzerland, his family members including; Prince Mahidol, Princess Mother, Prince Ananda, Galyani Vadhana	20 September 2017
50 baht	144 × 72 mm	Blue	King Bhumibol Adulyadej in the Royal House of Chakri gown	King Bhumibol reading a book, His coronation, his marriage with the Queen Sirikit, his monkhood	20 September 2017
100 baht	150 × 72 mm	Red	King Bhumibol Adulyadej in the Royal House of Chakri gown	Rural areas visiting, his family including; Sirikit, Vajiralongkorn, Ubolratana Rajakanya, Sirindhorn	20 September 2017
500 baht		Violet	King Bhumibol Adulyadej in the Royal House of Chakri gown	His agricultural works and inventions including; Chai Pattana water mill and Fon Luang project	20 September 2017
1,000 baht	162 × 72 mm	Brown	King Bhumibol Adulyadej in the Royal House of Chakri gown	60th Anniversary Celebrations of Bhumibol Adulyadej's Accession, the Bhumibol Bridge	20 September 2017

== 17th series ==
The 17th series banknotes are the current ones issued for circulation in Thailand from 2018 on. Since the Thai ritual of printing the current king's portrait on the obverse, the King Bhumibol's passing leading the Bank of Thailand to reissue the new version featuring the new king, Vajiralongkorn's portrait. The banknotes's reverses are designed on the idea of the ten kings in the Chakri dynasty's contributions and works on improving the country. Each note's reverse contains two kings and their works, sorting from the Rama I to Rama X, from the 20 baht to 1,000 baht, accordingly.

On 24 March 2022, the 20 baht banknote was reissued as a polymer banknote. The 20 baht was selected to be changed from paper to polymer to improve the quality as it is the most widely used banknote and hence quickly gets soiled and damaged. The new banknote has the same design as before with some additional polymer-note security features. Then on 21 November 2025, the 50 baht and 100 baht notes were also switched from paper to polymer, and also have the same design as before with some additional polymer-note security features.

17th series banknotes
Value	Dimensions	Main colour	Description			Date of issue
Value	Dimensions	Main colour	Obverse	Reverse		Date of issue
Value	Dimensions	Main colour	Obverse	Left	Right	Date of issue
20 baht	138 × 72 mm	Green	King Vajiralongkorn in the uniform of the commander of the Royal Thai Air Force	King Phutthayotfa Chulalok and Grand Palace	King Phutthaloetla Naphalai and Thai mural of a scene from Enau	6 April 2018 (paper) and 24 March 2022 (polymer)
50 baht	144 × 72 mm	Blue	King Vajiralongkorn in the uniform of the commander of the Royal Thai Air Force	King Nangklao and a Chinese junk	King Mongkut and Khao Wang	6 April 2018 (paper) and 21 November 2025 (polymer)
100 baht	150 × 72 mm	Red	King Vajiralongkorn in the uniform of the commander of the Royal Thai Air Force	King Chulalongkorn and his royal trip to visit Haakon VII of Norway in Norway. Bill shows King Chulalongkorn the Great - the royal trip to Norway; the picture shows himself riding in the car with Sam Eyde in Notodden, Norway. They were discussing about electricity as the king initiated the electricity usage in Siam after returning from Norway	King Vajiravudh and the founding of Thai Boy Scouts	6 April 2018 (paper) and 21 November 2025 (polymer)
500 baht	156 × 72 mm	Purple	King Vajiralongkorn in the uniform of the commander of the Royal Thai Air Force	King Prajadhipok (1893–1941) and his granting of the first constitution	King Ananda Mahidol and his visit to Sampheng with Prince Bhumibol at the time	28 July 2018
1,000 baht	162 × 72 mm	Brown	King Vajiralongkorn in the uniform of the commander of the Royal Thai Air Force	King Bhumibol Adulyadej and his visit to Nakhon Phanom, taking a lotus given by the elder Thoum	King Vajiralongkorn and his visit to somewhere in the rural Thailand	28 July 2018

The pictures displayed within the kings' portrait are the moment of each's works which could be described as follows:

- King Phutthayotfa Chulalok: The Grand Palace and Wat Phra Kaew represent his founding of the House of Chakri and the beginning of the Rattanakosin period. The two sites sit as the main hub and icon for the establishing of Bangkok.
- King Phutthaloetla Naphalai: the mural of a scene from Enau represents his keen in literature, the Enau was translated and re-written as Thai poems from Javanese "Panji" by himself. During his reign, Siam was in the golden age of literature.
- King Nangklao: Chinese junk represents his keen in trading with China as being called "Jao Sua" (เจ้าสัว), meaning the wealthy one.
- King Mongkut: Khao Wang in Phetchaburi represents his dedication in astronomy, making him the father of science for Thai. Khao Wang is the site of palaces and temple built by him, the site includes an observer as well.
- King Chulalongkorn: his royal trip to Russia, visiting the Tsar Nicholas II represents his great effort of pioneering the bonding relationships with western empires.
- King Vajiravudh: his horse riding, marking the founding of Thai boy scout (Luk Suae - ลูกเสือ) and the Wild Tiger Corps (Kong Suae Pah - กองเสือป่า). The event also means his dedication to improving the education in Thailand, asides from establishing the Thai boy scout, he founded the first university of the kingdom, Chulalongkorn University.
- King Prajadhipok: The declaration of the first constitution, as a result of Siamese revolution of 1932. He was the first king to be under the constitutional monarchy regime, marking the end of the long absolute monarchy in Thailand.
- King Ananda: The royal visit of Sampheng neighbourhood with his brother, Prince Bhumibol at the time. Sampheng is the major Thai-Chinese hub in Bangkok, his visit marked the acceptance of the Thai-Chinese population in Thailand for the first time in centuries.
- King Bhumibol: his visit to Nakhon Phanom province, accepting a lotus from the elder Thoum. The picture is iconic throughout Thailand, indicating his kindness visiting people in rural Thailand and his humility to the elders.

== Commemorative notes ==
In addition to the banknotes currently in circulation, numerous commemorative notes have been issued:

- 5 baht (1969): Date of the inauguration of the note printing works, Bank of Thailand (commemorative text added to regular 5 baht notes)
- 10 baht (1969): Date of the inauguration of the note printing works, Bank of Thailand (commemorative text added to regular 10 baht notes)
- 60 baht (1987): King Bhumibol Adulyadej's 60th birthday
- 50 baht (1990): Princess mother Srinagarindra's 90th birthday (commemorative text added to regular 50 baht notes)
- 500 baht (1990): Princess mother Srinagarindra's 90th birthday (commemorative text added to regular 500 baht notes)
- 1000 baht (1992): Queen Sirikit's 60th birthday (commemorative text added to regular 1000 baht notes)
- 10 baht (1996): 120th anniversary of the ministry of finance (commemorative text added to regular 10 baht notes)
- 50 baht (1996): King Bhumibol Adulyadej's 50th anniversary of accession to the throne (polymer note)
- 500 baht (1996): King Bhumibol Adulyadej's 50th anniversary of accession to the throne (polymer note)
- 500 baht (1996): King Bhumibol Adulyadej's 50th anniversary of accession to the throne (a different emblem)
- 1000 baht (1999): King Bhumibol Adulyadej's 72nd birthday (a different emblem)
- 50 baht (2000): 50th anniversary of royal wedding of King Bhumibol Adulyadej and Queen Sirikit
- 500,000 baht (2000): 50th anniversary of royal wedding of King Bhumibol Adulyadej and Queen Sirikit
- 100 baht (2002): The centenary of the issuance of Thai banknotes
- 100 baht (2004): Queen Sirikit's 72nd birthday
- 60 baht (2006): 60th Anniversary Celebrations of Bhumibol Adulyadej's Accession to the throne
- 16 baht (2007): King Bhumibol Adulyadej's 80th birthday (1, 5, 10 baht)
- 100 baht (2010): King Bhumibol Adulyadej's 60th anniversary of coronation day and the 60th anniversary of the wedding of the King and Queen Sirikit
- 100 baht (2011): King Bhumibol Adulyadej's 84th birthday
- 80 baht (2012): Queen Sirikit's 80th birthday
- 100 baht (2012): Crown Prince Maha Vajiralongkorn's 5th Cycle (60th) birthday
- 100 baht (2015): Princess Maha Chakri Sirindhorn's 5th Cycle (60th) birthday
- 70 baht (2016): 70th anniversary of King Bhumibol Adulyadej's accession to the throne
- 500 baht (2016): Queen Sirikit's 7th cycle (84th) birthday
- 20 to 1,000 baht (2017): In remembrance of King Bhumibol Adulyadej.
- 100 baht (2020): The 1st anniversary of the Royal Coronation Ceremony of Maha Vajiralongkorn (Rama X).
- 1,000 baht (2020): The 1st anniversary of the Royal Coronation Ceremony of Maha Vajiralongkorn (Rama X).
- 100 baht (2024): King Vajiralongkorn 6th cycle (72nd) birthday.
- 100 baht (2025): The 150th Anniversary of the Founding of the Ministry of Finance

== See also ==
- 20 baht note
- 50 baht note
- 100 baht note
- 500 baht note
- 1000 baht note
