= Twenty-baht banknote =

20 Baht
- Country: Thailand
- Value: 20 Baht
- Width: 138 mm
- Height: 72 mm
- Security features: EURion constellation, see-through registration device, windowed color-shifting security thread, watermark (regular and electrotype)
- Years of printing: 2018 on (17th series)

Obverse
- Design: portrait of Vajiralongkorn

Reverse
- Design: Kings Phra Buddha Yodfa Chulaloke and Phra Buddha Loetla Nabhalai

The 20 baht note (20฿) is currently the lowest-in-value baht banknote and has been used since 1892. The 17th series notes are currently in circulation having been introduced in 2018. The 15th, 16th and 16th (special) series are commonly used as well. The front side shows a portrait of Vajiralongkorn, the current head of the state or the king. The reverse depicts Kings Phra Buddha Yodfa Chulaloke and Phra Buddha Loetla Nabhalai. Since 2022, this denomination has been printed in polymer.

== 12th series ==
This banknote, used from 1981 through 2003, features King Bhumibol's portrait on its obverse and the monument of King Taksin the Great accompanied by his four trusted soldiers at Chantaburi on its reverse. This note wasn't redesigned for the 13th and 14th series.

== 15th series ==
The obverse features King Bhumibol's portrait. The reverse features a portrait of King Ananda and the Rama VIII bridge, which was built to commemorate him, and the other image depicts his royal visit of the Sampheng Thai-Chinese neighbourhood in Bangkok with then-prince Bhumibol to re-strengthen the relationship with the Thai-Chinese community after a long while.

== 16th series ==
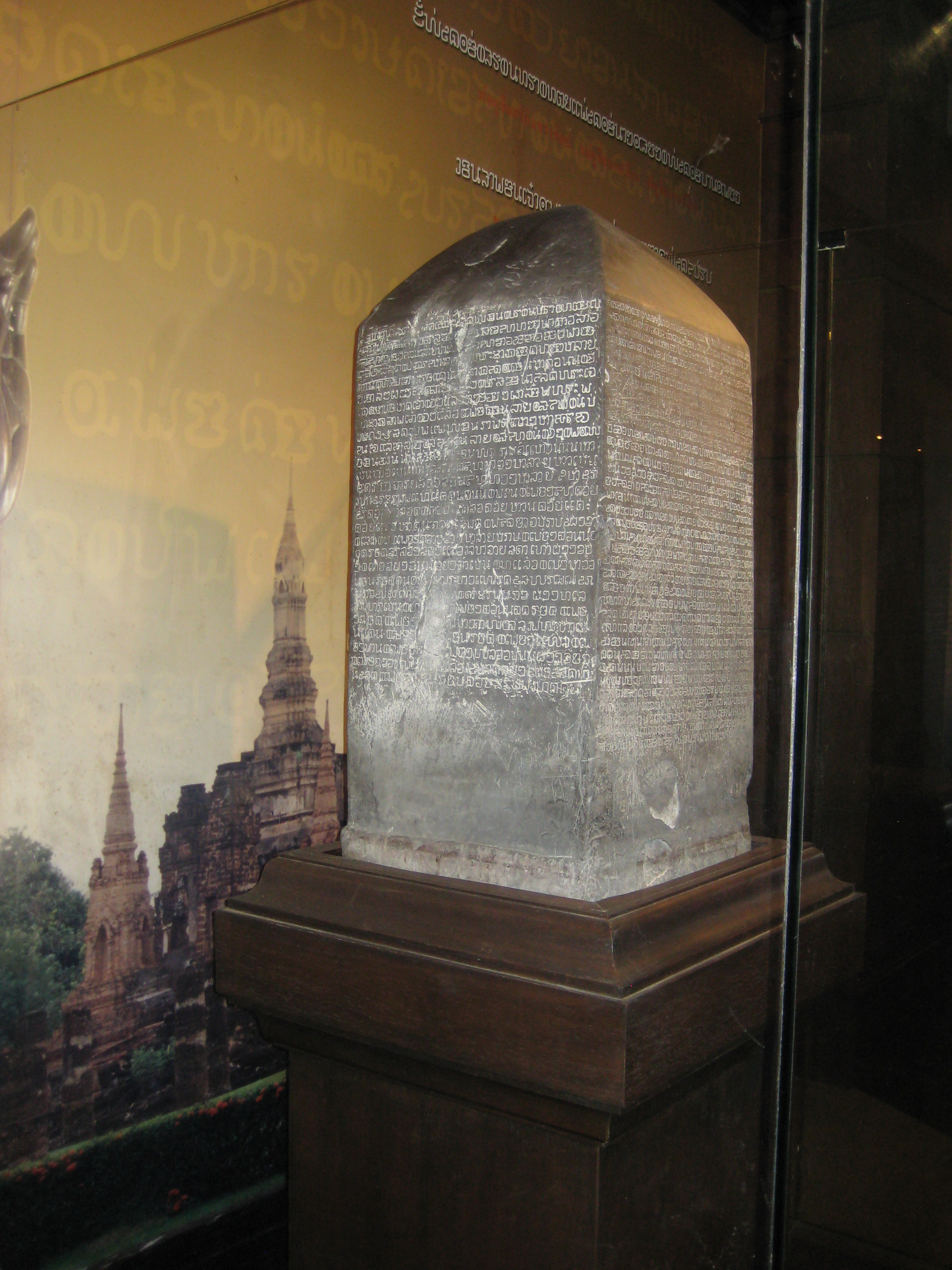
Ram Kam Haeng inscription

The obverse features King Bhumibol's new portrait which was revised to reflect his age. The reverse side of the note is designed under the concept of the great kings from the Sukhothai period; Ramkhamhaeng the great was selected for this denomination. The elements include (from left to right):

- The Ramkhamhaeng stele
- A commoner ringing the royal bell to request a hearing with the king
- King Ramkhamhaeng inventing Lai Seu Thai, the earliest Thai script
- Ramkhamhaeng during a royal audience
- Sangkhalok ceramic wares

== 16th series (special) ==
The 16th series 20 baht note was issued to commemorate and pay tribute to the late King Bhumibol. The front side of the note remains the same as the 16th series. The back side of the note, however, represents his early life and childhood. From left to right:

- A picture of him playing with then-prince Ananda Mahidol
- His father, the reverend Prince Mahidol Adulyadej with the young Prince Bhumibol in his arms
- An early family picture including Princess Mother Srinagarind, Princess Galyani Vadhana; his sister, Prince Ananda Mahidol and himself.
- The young prince Bhumibol (centre picture)
- The royal residence in Lausanne, Switzerland
- The young prince Bhumibol on a canoe

== 17th series (both paper and polymer) ==
The design concept of the 17th series is based on the idea of commemorating the kings of the current house of Chakri. The 20 baht note's reverse depicts kings Rama I and II of Siam, the first two kings of the dynasty. The pictures next to each king are the notable works done for Siam. For the 20 baht note, this includes:

- King Phra Buddha Yodfah Chulaloke the Great - the Grand Palace and Wat Phra Kaew temple of Bangkok; Rama I was the first king of Chakri dynasty, establishing the Rattanakosin Kingdom and building the Grand Palace, the residence of the rulers, and Wat Phra Kaew, the religious centre of the newly-founded kingdom.
- King Phra Buddha Loetlah Naphalai - the mural showing a scene from Enau which was translated and re-written as Thai poems (klon) from Javanese Panji by the king himself. During his reign, Siam was in "the golden age of literature". The king loved writing poems, being called "the poet king", and many poets started to shine during his reign; Sunthon Phu, for example.
