= Chit Singhaseni =

Thai royal page (1904-55)

- ชิต สิงหเสนี
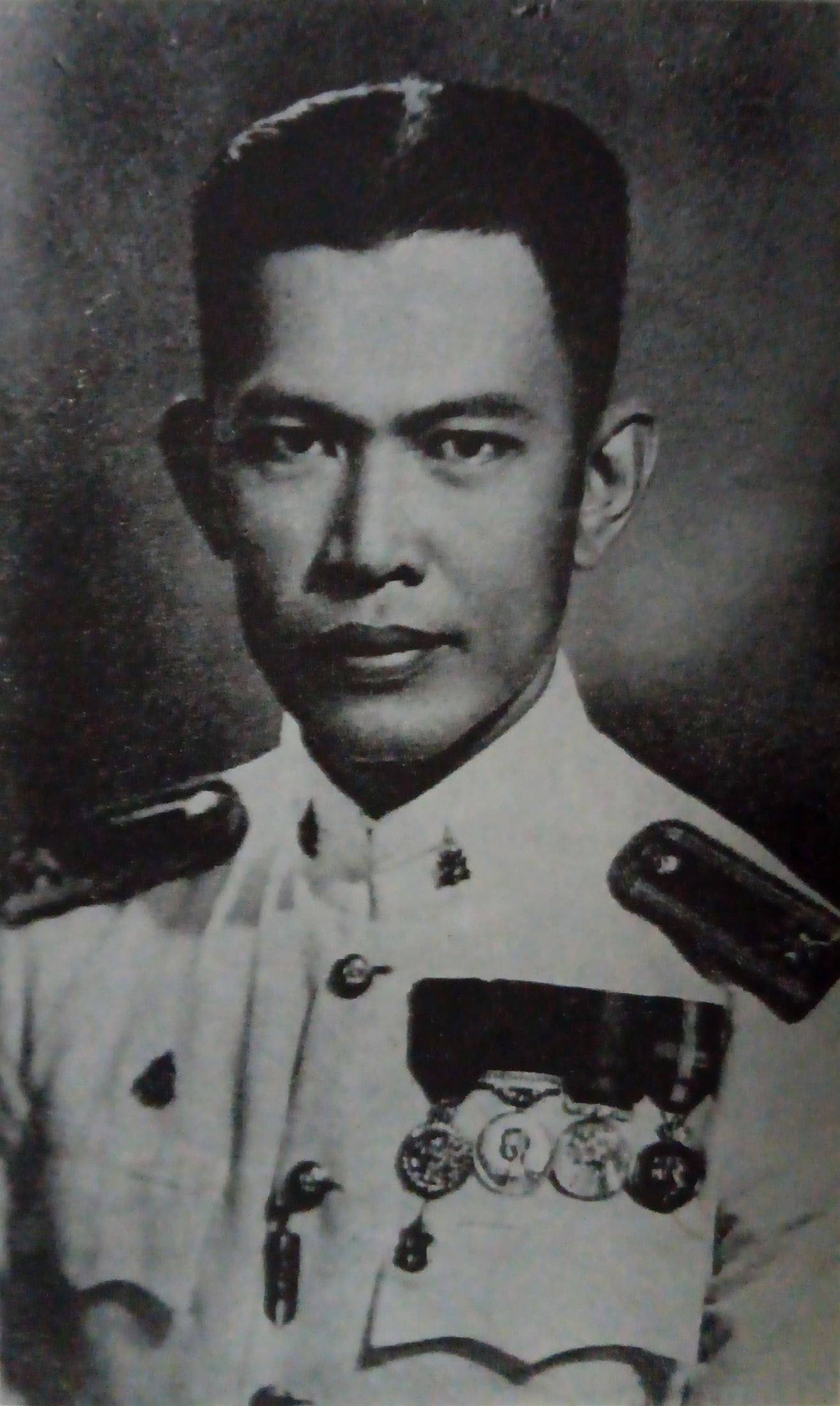
- Chit in full ceremonial uniform
- Born: July 5, 1904
- Died: February 17, 1955 (aged 50); Bang Kwang Central Prison, Nonthaburi Province, Thailand
- Cause of death: Execution by firing squad
- Education: Royal Pages School
- Occupation: Royal page
- Known for: Convicted and executed for connection to the death of King Ananda Mahidol
- Spouse: Chuachuea Kritsanamara
- Children: 7
- Parent(s): Phraya Anuchitchanchai (Sai Singhaseni); Nom Singhaseni
- Status: Executed
- Convictions: Assault against the King, the Queen, the Heir-Apparent, and the Regent (Penal Code Section 97, Paragraph 2)
- Penalty: Death sentence

Details
- Victims: King Ananda Mahidol (Rama VIII)
- Date: 9 June 1946
- Country: Thailand
- State: Phra Nakhon
- Locations: Boromphiman Throne Hall, Grand Palace
- Date apprehended: 15 November 1947
- Imprisoned at: Bang Kwang Central Prison

Chit Singhaseni (Thai: ชิต สิงหเสนี; 5 July 1904 – 17 February 1955) was a Thai royal page who entered royal service during the reign of King Prajadhipok (Rama VII). He was later accused of complicity in the death of King Ananda Mahidol (Rama VIII). The Supreme Court of Thailand found him guilty and sentenced him to execution by firing squad, alongside co-defendants But Patthamasarin and Chalieo Pathumros, at Bang Kwang Central Prison.

== Biography ==
Chit Singhaseni was born on 5 July 1904. He was the son of Police General Major General Phraya Anuchitchanchai (Sai Singhaseni) and Nom (née Suwannathat). He had three biological siblings:

1. Chit Singhaseni
2. Khun Ying Anong Sirirajmaitri (wife of Luang Sirirajmaitri (Jaroon Singhaseni))
3. Sanan Singhaseni
4. Sanoh Kunchon na Ayudhaya

Chit was educated at the Royal Pages School during the reign of King Vajiravudh (Rama VI) and began working as a royal page in the early part of the reign of King Prajadhipok. His final assignment was serving as the royal bedchamber page to King Ananda Mahidol.

Following the death of King Ananda Mahidol on 9 June 1946, Chit was charged with treason and complicity in regicide. The Supreme Court of Thailand passed down a final verdict of execution. He was executed by firing squad alongside But Patthamasarin and Chalieo Pathumros at Bang Kwang Central Prison on 17 February 1955 at the age of 50.

In later years, historical analyses and research based on evidentiary findings made public after the verdicts have led many contemporary scholars and historians to deduce that Chit Singhaseni and the other two co-defendants executed with him may have been innocent scapegoats in the case.

== Family ==
Chit married Chuachuea (originally named Walee Kritsanamara). They had seven children:

1. Sompong Singhaseni
2. Phongphan Singhaseni
3. Puangstri Singhaseni
4. Wilasi Singhaseni
5. Chawaporn Singhaseni
6. Chawanda Singhaseni
7. Laksana Singhaseni

== Honours ==
=== National honours ===
- (Thailand) King Ananda Mahidol Royal Cypher Medal, 5th Class (1938)
- (Thailand) King Prajadhipok Coronation Medal (1926)
- (Thailand) King Prajadhipok Ratanabhaporn Medal (1932)

=== Foreign honours ===
- Denmark:
  - 1943 – King Christian X's Centenary Medal of King Frederik VIII's Birth

== See also ==
- Capital punishment in Thailand
