= One-hundred-baht banknote =

Thai Baht Banknote (Currency)

100 Baht
- Country: Thailand
- Value: 100 Baht
- Width: 150 mm
- Height: 72 mm
- Security features: EURion constellation, see-through registration device, windowed color-shifting security thread, watermark (regular and electrotype), latent image
- Years of printing: 2025 on (17th series)

Obverse
- Design: portrait of Vajiralongkorn

Reverse
- Design: King Chulalongkorn and King Vajiravudh

The 100 baht note (100฿) is one of the most commonly used Thai baht banknotes and has been used since 1892. The 17th series notes are currently in circulation having been introduced in 2018. The 15th, 16th and 16th (special) series are also very common in circulation. The front side shows a portrait of Vajiralongkorn, the current head of the state or the king. The reverse depicts King Chulalongkorn and King Vajiravudh.

== 11th series ==
The obverse features the portrait of the King Bhumibol with Phra Garuda Pah (the emblem of royal family). The reverse features the Grand Palace and Wat Phra Kaew.

== 12th series ==
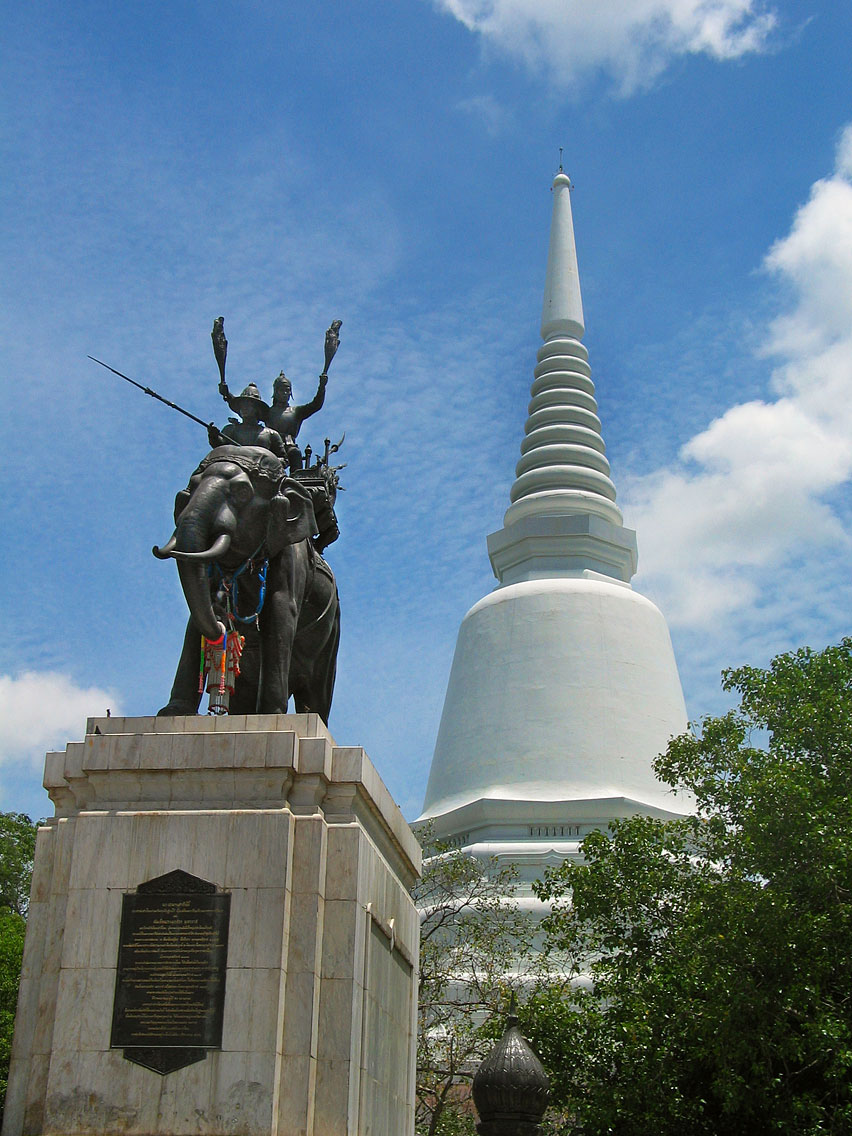
The monument of King Naresuan the Great at Don Chedi Memorial

The obverse features the portrait of the King Bhumibol. The reverse features the monument of King Naresuan the Great at Don Chedi Memorial in Suphanburi province.

The 100 baht note since had not been redesigned in the 13th series.

== 14th series ==
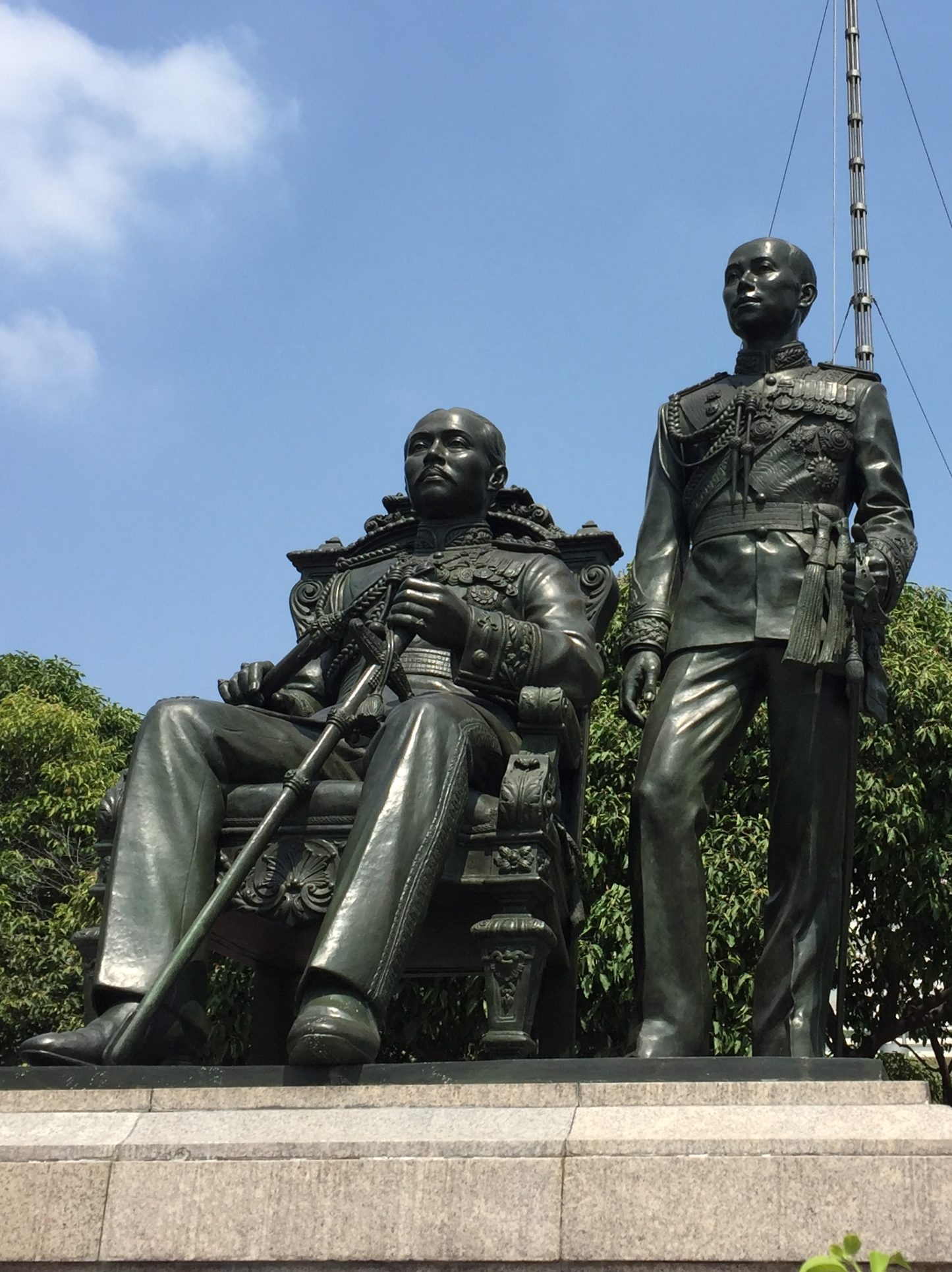
the Two Kings Monument of Chulalongkorn University

The obverse features the portrait of the King Bhumibol. The reverse comes under the concept of "Education reformation in Siam" which includes (from left to right)

- A school, a group of students in Thai school uniform.
- A book, and an ignited candle.
- The Two Kings Monument at Chulalongkorn University, including King Chulalongkorn and King Vajiravudh.
- A monk teaching children inside a wat (temple); in the past, temples were the main place for education in Siam before schools were built.

== 15th series ==
The obverse features the King Bhumibol's portrait. The reverses include two designs; type I and II.

Type I: The reverse remains the same as it was in 14th series, with some adjustment of the design and typography.

Type II: The reverse includes (from left to right)

- The scene of slavery-ending in Siam by the King Chulalongkorn, it is a mural painted in a dome in the Ananta Samakhom Throne Hall.
- A portrait of King Chulalongkorn.

== 16th series ==
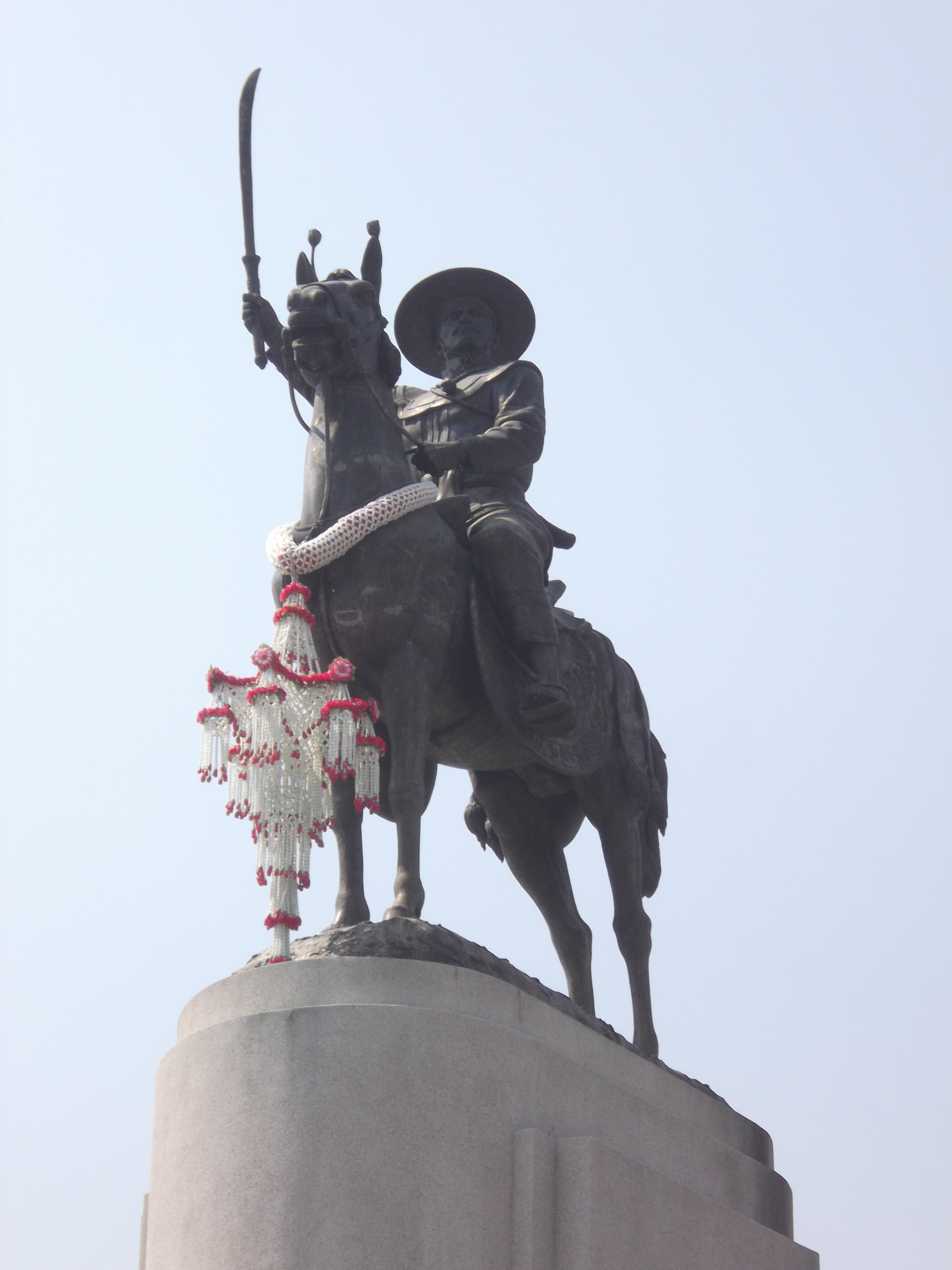
The equastrian monument of King Taksin the great at Wongwian Yai

The obverse features the King Bhumibol's new portrait which changes as he grew old. The reverse is designed under the concept of the great king from Thonburi period, King Taksin the great. The elements include (from left to right):

- Wi Chai Prasith fortress.
- Equastrian Monument of King Taksin at Wongwian Yai.
- His statue (centre image).
- Thonburi Palace (Phra Ratcha Wang Doem).
- The relief illustrating the scene which he persuading his contingent to fight during the time of war.

== 16th series (special) ==
The 16th series 100 baht note is issued to commemorate and pay tribute to the late King Bhumibol. The obverse remains the same as the 16th series. The reverse, however, represents his work in rural Thailand. From left to right;

- His royal trip to rural Chiang Mai province, riding on horse back.
- Two aeroplanes operating Royal Rainmaking Project.
- The king discussing with a local, sitting by the car.
- The king's iconic picture having sweat pouring down his nose (centre picture).
- The king observing a rice field.
- The royal family of the king, including; Queen Sirikit, Ubol Ratana, Vajiralongkorn, Sirindhorn and Chulabhorn.

== 17th series ==
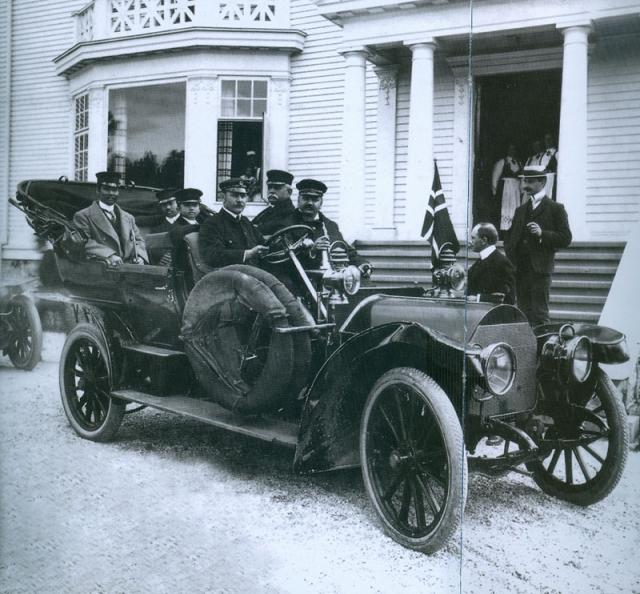
King Chulalongkorn the great riding his car during his royal trip to Norway

The design concept of 17th series is based on the theme of commemorating the kings of the current house of Chakri. The 100 baht note's reverse depicts kings Rama V and Rama VI of Thailand. The pictures next by each kings are the notable works done for Siam. For 100 baht note;

- King Chulalongkorn the great - the royal trip to Norway; the picture shows himself riding in the car with Sam Eyde in Notodden, Norway. They were discussing about electricity as the king initiated the electricity usage in Siam after resturning from Norway.
- King Vajiravudh - his riding on the horseback for his establishing of the Wild Tiger Corps (กองเสือป่า) and Boy Scouts in Thailand.

The paper note was issued on 6 April 2018, and the polymer note of the same design was issued on 21 November 2025.
