= Ananda Mahidol =

King of Thailand from 1935 to 1946

- King Rama VIII
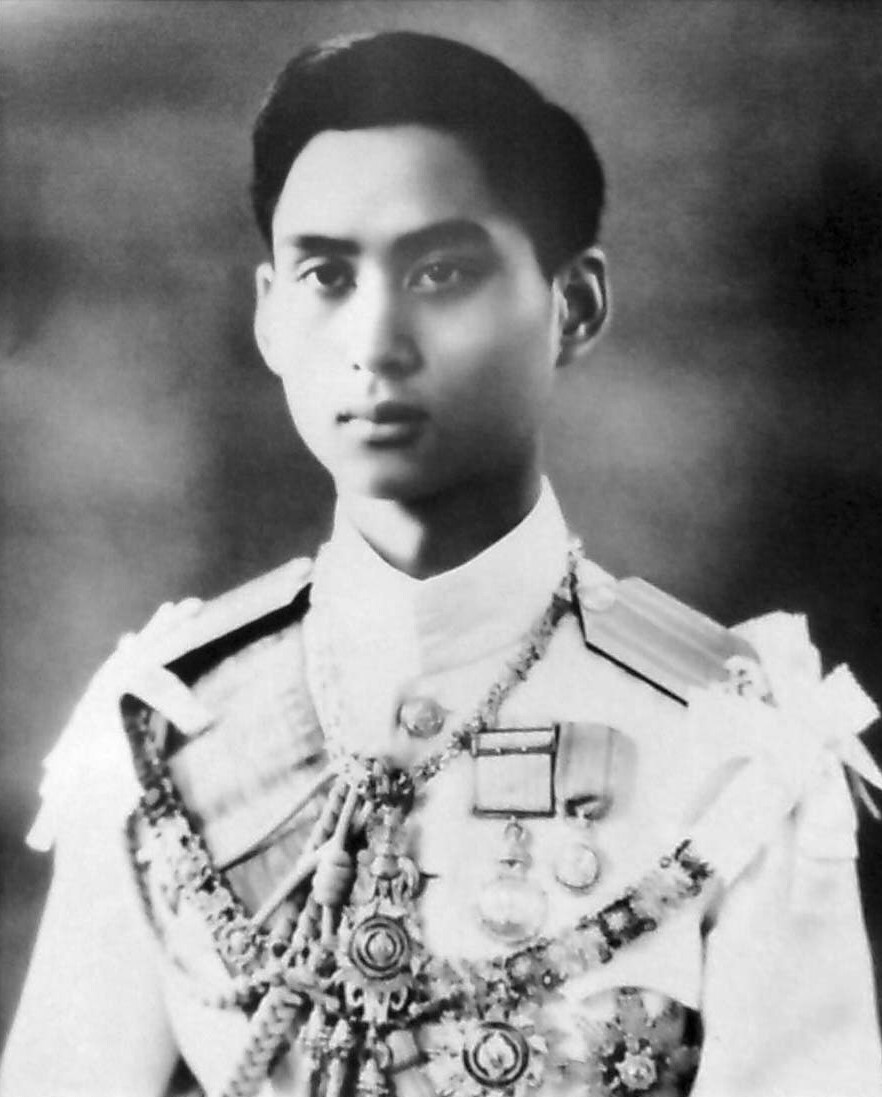
- Formal portrait, 1946

King of Thailand
- Reign: 2 March 1935 – 9 June 1946
- Coronation: 13 August 1946 (posthumous)
- Predecessor: Prajadhipok (Rama VII)
- Successor: Bhumibol Adulyadej (Rama IX)
- Regent: See list: Oscar Anuvatana (1935); Aditya Dibabha (1935–1944); Pan Sukhum (1935–1938); Bijayendra Yodhin (1935–1942); Pridi Banomyong (1941–1945)
- Born: 20 September 1925; Heidelberg, Germany
- Died: 9 June 1946 (aged 20); Bangkok, Thailand
- Burial: 29 March 1950; Sanam Luang, Bangkok
- House: Mahidol (Note: In the Thai tradition, the house (ราชสกุล) is distinct from the dynasty (ราชวงศ์). Ananda Mahidol was the first king of the House of Mahidol (ราชสกุลมหิดล) and the eighth king of the Chakri dynasty (ราชวงศ์จักรี).)
- Dynasty: Chakri
- Father: Mahidol Adulyadej
- Mother: Sangwan Talapat
- Religion: Theravada Buddhism

Ananda Mahidol (Note: Thai: อานันทมหิดล; RTGS: Ananthamahidon) (20 September 1925 – 9 June 1946) was the eighth king of Siam (later Thailand) from the Chakri dynasty, titled Rama VIII. At the time he was recognised as king by the National Assembly in March 1935, he went to Switzerland when he was nine years-old. He returned to Thailand in December 1945, but six months later, in June 1946, he was found shot dead in his bed. Although at first thought to have been an accident, his death was ruled a murder by medical examiners, and three royal aides were later executed following irregular trials. The mysterious circumstances surrounding his death have been the subject of much controversy.

== Name ==
Ananda Mahidol (Thai: อานันทมหิดล; RTGS: Ananthamahidon) is his given name, and is one word in Thai. King Vajiravudh, his uncle, sent a telegram on 13 October 1925 bestowing upon him this name, which means "the joy of Mahidol". When he held his birth rank of Mom Chao—the lowest rank of Thai princes—he used the surname Mahidol, his father's given name. His full name and title was thus Mom Chao Ananda Mahidol Mahidol (Thai: หม่อมเจ้าอานันทมหิดล มหิดล).

Upon his accession, he became known as Somdet Phra Chao Yu Hua Ananda Mahidol (Thai: สมเด็จพระเจ้าอยู่หัวอานันทมหิดล). Somdet Phra Chao Yu Hua is the title of a Thai king prior to coronation.

After his death, his brother and successor King Bhumibol Adulyadej posthumously elevated his title to that of a crowned king. He was posthumously renamed again in 1996, so as to give him an auspiciously long name similar to the names of his predecessors Mongkut, Chulalongkorn, Vajiravudh, and Prajadhipok. Nowadays, Thais refer to him officially as Phra Bat Somdet Phra Poramenthra Maha Ananda Mahidol Phra Atthama Ramathibodindara (Thai: พระบาทสมเด็จพระปรเมนทรมหาอานันทมหิดลฯ พระอัฐมรามาธิบดินทร), an abbreviation of the latest name given to him.

== Early life ==
Prince Ananda Mahidol was born in Heidelberg, Germany. He was the first son of Prince Mahidol Adulyadej of Songkla (son of King Rama V) and Mom Sangwan (last title Somdej Phra Sri Nakarindhara Borommaratchachonnani) who were studying there at the time. He was the first Thai King to be born outside of the country.

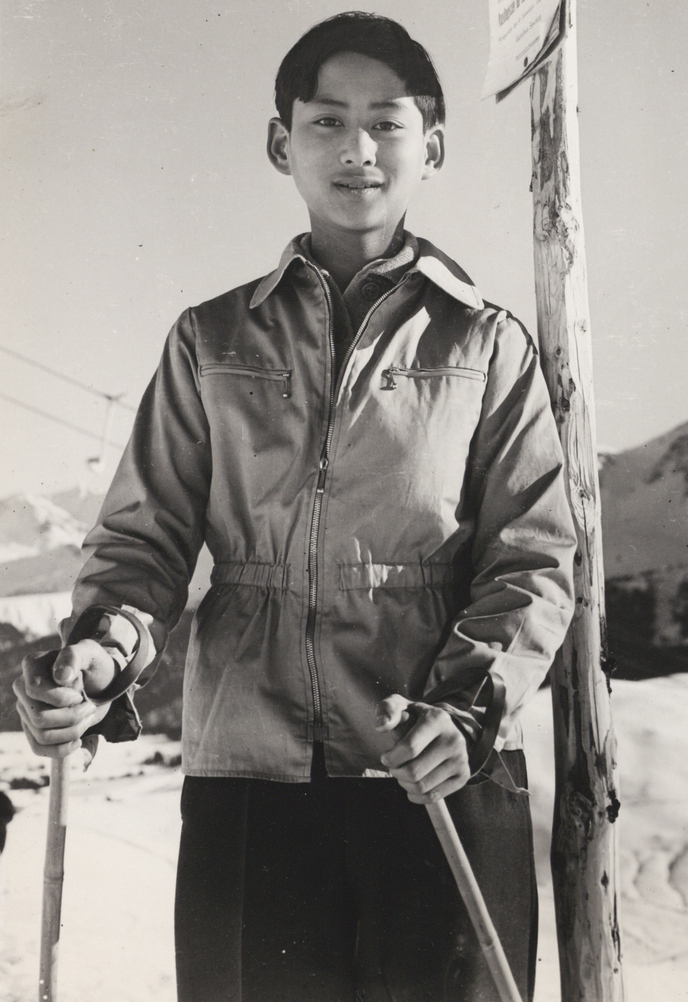
Rama VIII at 14 years old, in Switzerland

He went with his parents to Paris, Lausanne, and then to Massachusetts, when in 1927, his uncle, King Prajadhipok, issued a royal edict elevating him to the higher princely class of Phra Worawong Ther Phra Ong Chao (this edict also benefited other "Mom Chao" who were the children of Chao Fa and their commoner wives, among them his elder sister Mom Chao Galyani Vadhana and his younger brother who was born later that year Phra Worawong Ther Phra Ong Chao Bhumibol Adulyadej).

The family returned to Thailand in 1928 after Prince Mahidol finished his medical studies at Harvard University. Prince Mahidol died at age 37 in 1929, when Ananda Mahidol was four years old. His widowed mother was thus left to raise her family alone.

He briefly attended Debsirin School in Bangkok before the revolution in 1932 ended the absolute monarchy and raised the possibility that King Prajadhipok might abdicate. Queen Savang Vadhana, his grandmother, was concerned about Prince Ananda Mahidol's safety, since he was one of the likely heirs to the throne. It was then suggested that Mom Sangwal and her children return to Lausanne, and when they did so in 1933, the official reason given was for the health and further education of the princes.

Prince Ananda Mahidol spent most of his youth in Switzerland. However, when King Prajadhipok's abdication appeared imminent, the prince's mother was approached by a member of the government, asking for her opinion about Ananda Mahidol succeeding as monarch.

== Circumstances of succession ==
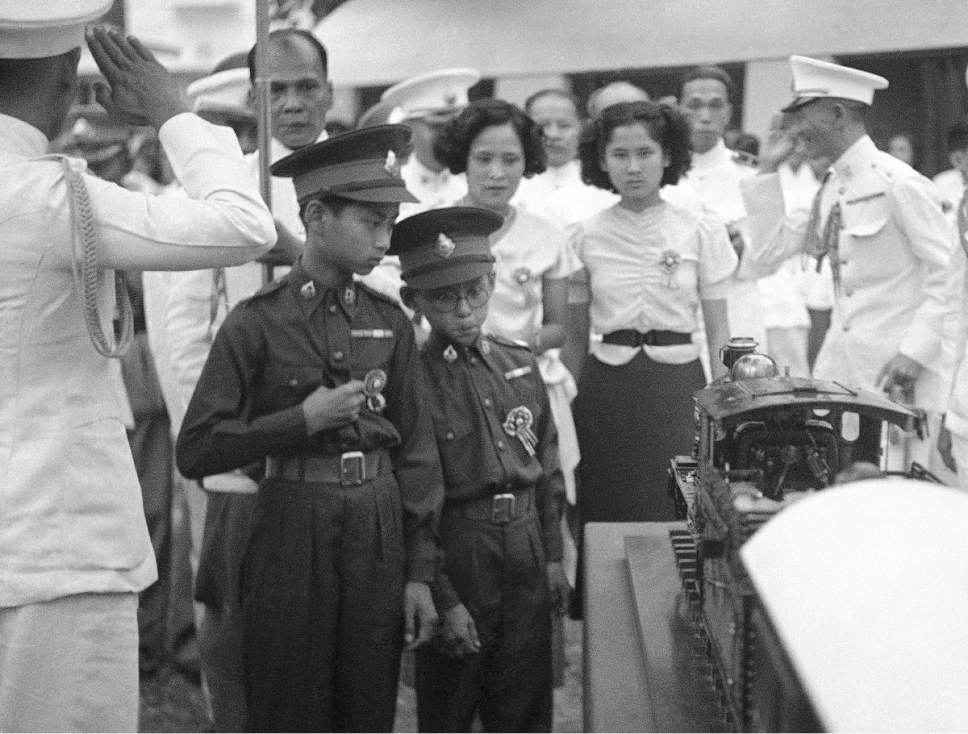
Thirteen year old King Ananda of Siam (left), and his brother Prince Bhumibol Adulyadej (right), inspect a model train presented to him at Saranrom Park in Bangkok in 1938

Thailand/Siam during Rama VIII's reign

King Prajadhipok (Rama VII) abdicated in 1935 due to political quarrels with the new quasi-democratic government as well as health problems. The king decided to abstain from exercising his prerogative to name a successor to the throne. By that time, the crown had already passed from Prince Mahidol's line to that of his half-brother's when his eldest full brother, Crown Prince Maha Vajirunhis, died as a teenager during King Chulalongkorn's reign. A half-brother, Prince Vajiravudh (as the next eldest) replaced Prince Vajirunhis as the crown prince. He eventually succeeded to the throne in 1910 as King Rama VI. In 1924 the king instituted the Palace Law of Succession in order to govern subsequent successions. The law gave priority to the children of his mother Queen Regent Saovabha Phongsri over the children of King Chulalongkorn's two other royal wives. The law was enacted on the death of King Vajiravudh in 1925 and the crown passed to his youngest brother, Prince Prajadhipok of Sukhothai.

Offering the throne to Prince Prajadhipok was not without a debate. In doing so, another candidate was bypassed: Prince Chula Chakrabongse, son of the late Field Marshal Prince Chakrabongse Bhuvanath of Phitsanulok, who before his death had been the heir-apparent to King Vajiravudh. It was questioned whether the Succession Law enacted by King Vajiravudh actually barred Prince Chakrabongse Bhuvanath (and for that matter, Prince Chula Chakrabongse) from succession on the grounds that he married a foreigner. However, his marriage had taken place before this law was enacted and had been endorsed by King Chulalongkorn himself. There was no clear resolution, but in the end the many candidates were passed over and Prince Prajadhipok was enthroned.

When King Prajadhipok later abdicated, since he was the last remaining son of Queen Saovabha, the crown went back to the sons of the queen whose rank was next to hers: Queen Savang Vadhana, mother of the late Crown Prince Vajirunhis. Besides the late crown prince, she had two more sons who survived to adulthood: Prince Sommatiwongse Varodaya of Nakhon Si Thammarat, who had died without a son in 1899, and Prince Mahidol who, although deceased, had two living sons. It thus appeared that Prince Ananda Mahidol would be the first person in the royal line of succession.

Nevertheless, the same debate over the half-foreign Prince Chula Chakrabongse occurred again. It was argued that King Vajiravudh had virtually exempted the prince's father from the ban in the Succession Law, and the crown might thus be passed to him.

However, since the kingdom was now governed under a constitution, it was the cabinet that would decide. Opinion was split on the right to succession of Prince Chula Chakrabongse. A key figure was Pridi Banomyong, who persuaded the cabinet that the Law should be interpreted as excluding the prince from succession, and that Prince Ananda Mahidol should be the next king. It also appeared more convenient for the government to have a monarch who was only nine years old and studying in Switzerland. On 2 March 1935, Prince Ananda Mahidol was elected by the National Assembly and the Thai government to succeed his uncle, King Prajadhipok, as the eighth king of the Chakri dynasty.

== Reign ==
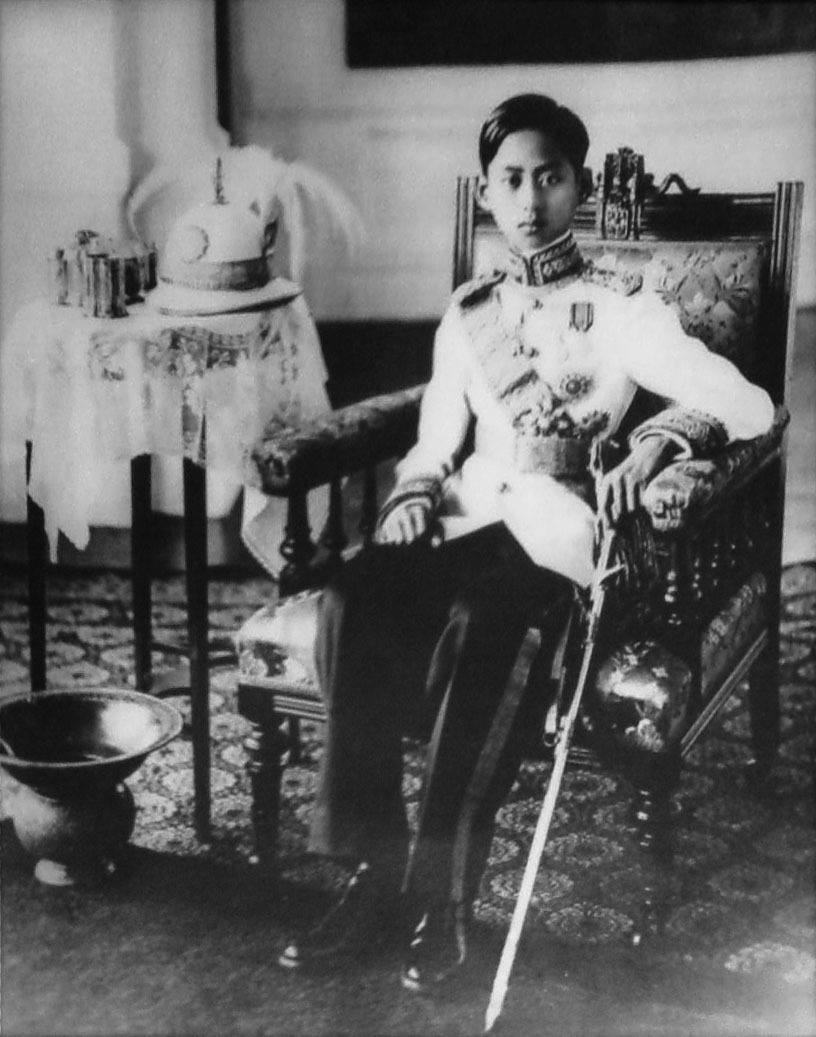
Photograph of the King in 1939

Since the new king was still a child and was still studying in Switzerland, the National Assembly appointed Colonel Prince Anuwatjaturong, Lieutenant Commander Prince Aditya Dibabha, and Chao Phraya Yommaraj (Pun Sukhum) as his regents.

In 1938, at age thirteen, Ananda Mahidol visited Siam for the first time as its monarch. The king was accompanied during his visit by his mother and his younger brother, Bhumibol Adulyadej. Field Marshal Plaek Phibunsongkhram was prime minister at the time and during most of Ananda Mahidol's brief reign.

=== World War II ===
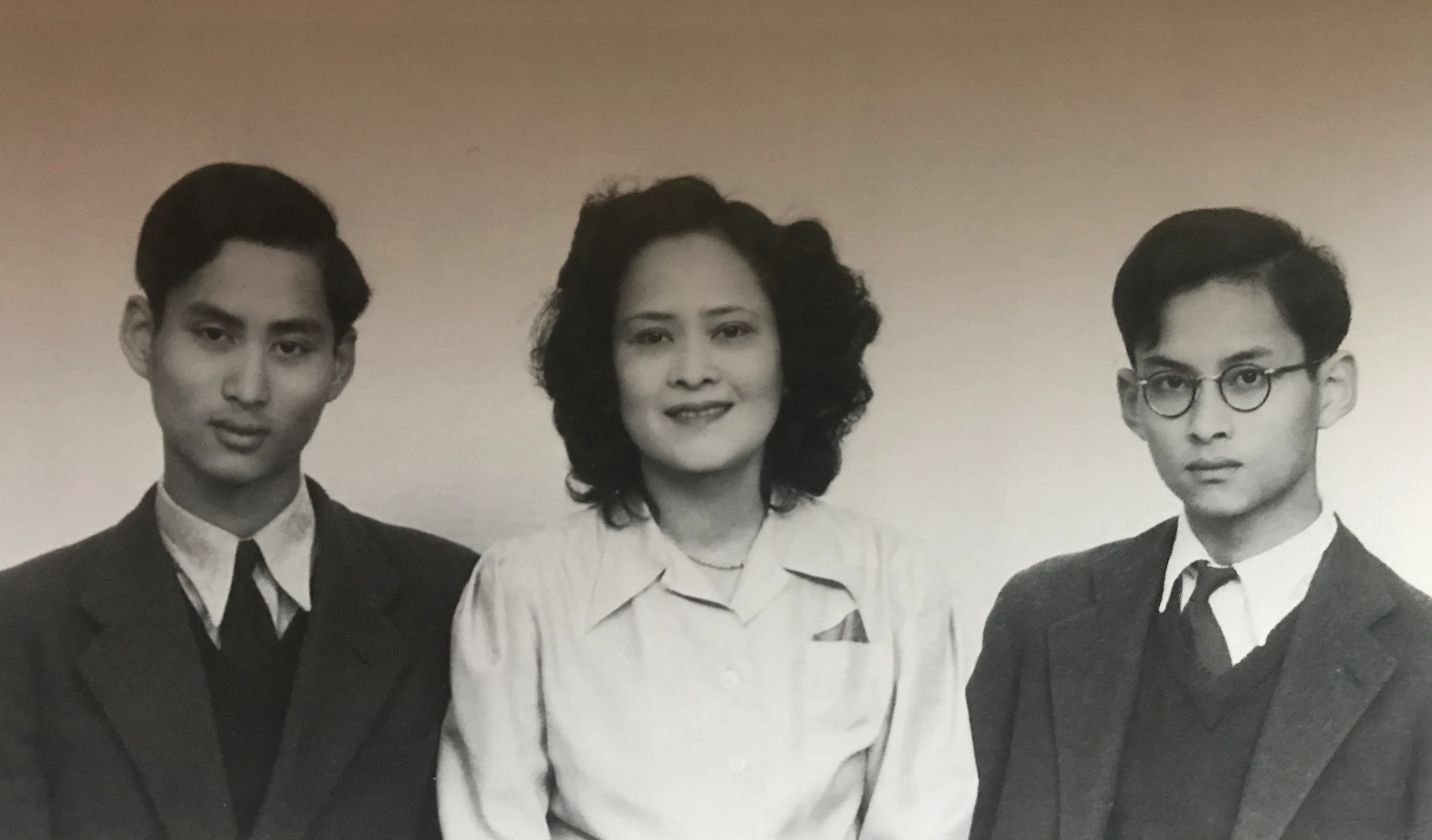
King Ananda with his mother Princess Srinagarindra and brother Prince Bhumibol, October 1945

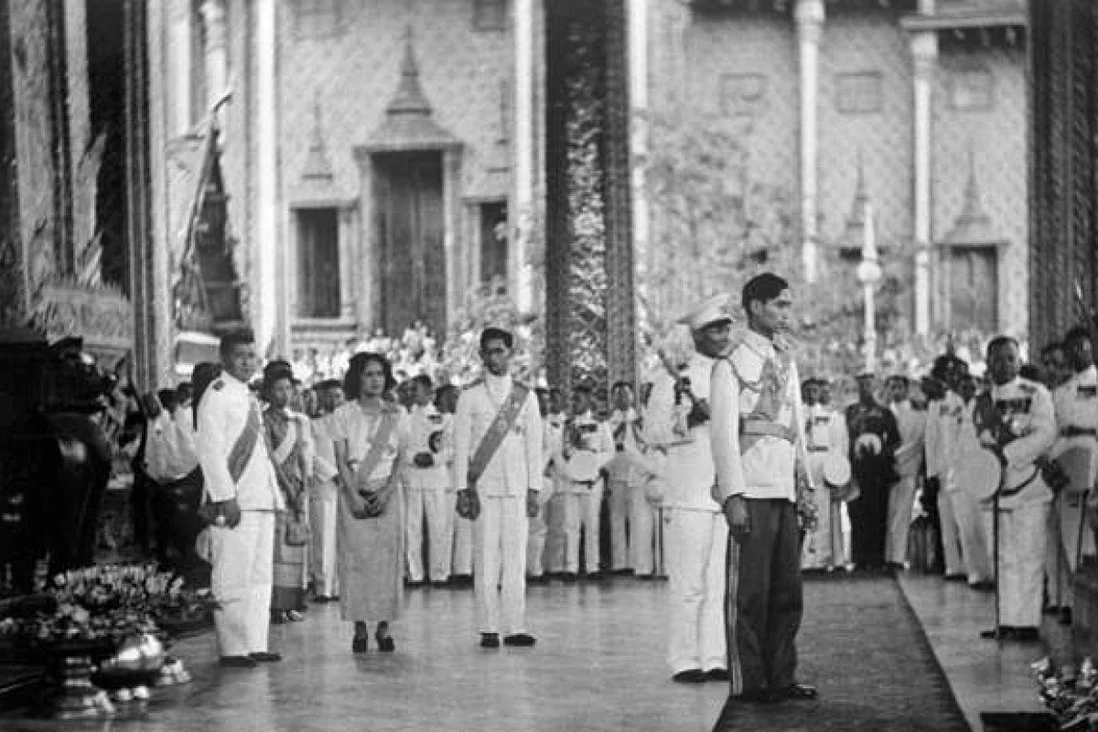
King Ananda Mahidol returned from Switzerland to Thailand, during an official ceremony in January 1946 in Bangkok, with Pridi Banomyong, Srinagarindra, and Prince Bhumibol

On 8 December 1941, Thailand was invaded by Japan. Despite fierce fighting in Southern Thailand, the fighting lasted only five hours before ending in a ceasefire. Thailand and Japan then formed an alliance making Thailand part of the Axis alliance until the end of World War II. King Ananda was away from the country, as he had returned to Switzerland to complete his studies, and Pridi Banomyong served as regent in his absence. From 24 January 1942, Thailand became a formal ally of the Empire of Japan and a member of the Axis. Under Plaek Phibunsongkhram, Thailand declared war on the Allied powers. The regent refused to sign the declaration and it was thus legally invalid. Many members of the Thai government, including the Siamese embassy in Japan, acted as de facto spies in the Seri Thai underground on the side of the Allies, funnelling secret information to British intelligence and the US Office of Strategic Services. By 1944, it was apparent that Japan was going to lose the war. Bangkok suffered heavily from the Allied bombing raids. These, plus economic hardships, made the war and the government of Plaek Phibunsongkhram very unpopular. In July, Plaek Phibunsongkhram was ousted by the Seri Thai-infiltrated government. The National Assembly reconvened and appointed the liberal lawyer Khuang Aphaiwong prime minister. Japan surrendered on 15 August 1945, and Allied military responsibility for Thailand fell to Britain.

=== Post-war ===
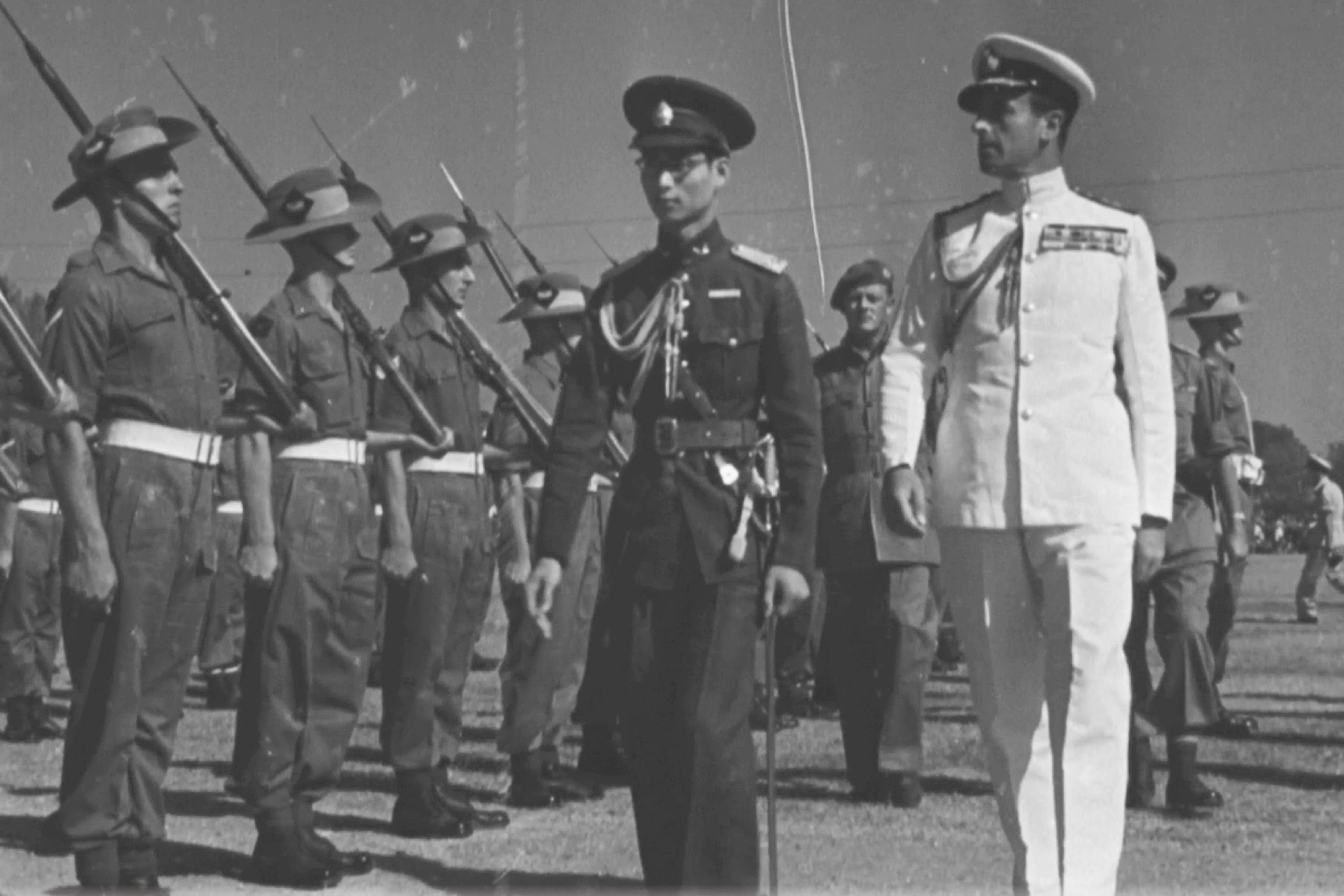
King Ananda Mahidol and Louis Mountbatten on 19 January 1946

Only after the end of World War II could Ananda Mahidol return to Thailand. He returned for a second visit in December 1945 with a degree in law. Despite his youth and inexperience, he quickly won the hearts of the Thai people, who had continued to revere the monarchy through the upheavals of the 1930s and 1940s. The Thai were delighted to have their king amongst them once again. One of his well-remembered activities was a highly successful visit to Bangkok's Chinatown Sampheng Lane (ซอยสำเพ็ง), which was intended to defuse the post-war tensions that lingered between Bangkok's ethnic Chinese and Thai people.

Foreign observers, however, believed that Ananda Mahidol did not want to be king and felt his reign would not last long. Louis Mountbatten, Earl Mountbatten of Burma, the British commander in Southeast Asia, visited Bangkok in January 1946 and described the king as "a frightened, short-sighted boy, his sloping shoulders and thin chest behung with gorgeous diamond-studded decorations, altogether a pathetic and lonely figure". At a public function, Mountbatten wrote: "[H]is nervousness increased to such an alarming extent, that I came very close to support him in case he passed out".

== Death ==
On 9 June 1946, the king was found shot dead in his bedroom in the Boromphiman Throne Hall (a modern residential palace located in the Grand Palace), only four days before he was scheduled to return to Switzerland to finish his doctoral degree in law at the University of Lausanne.

=== Events of 9 June 1946 ===
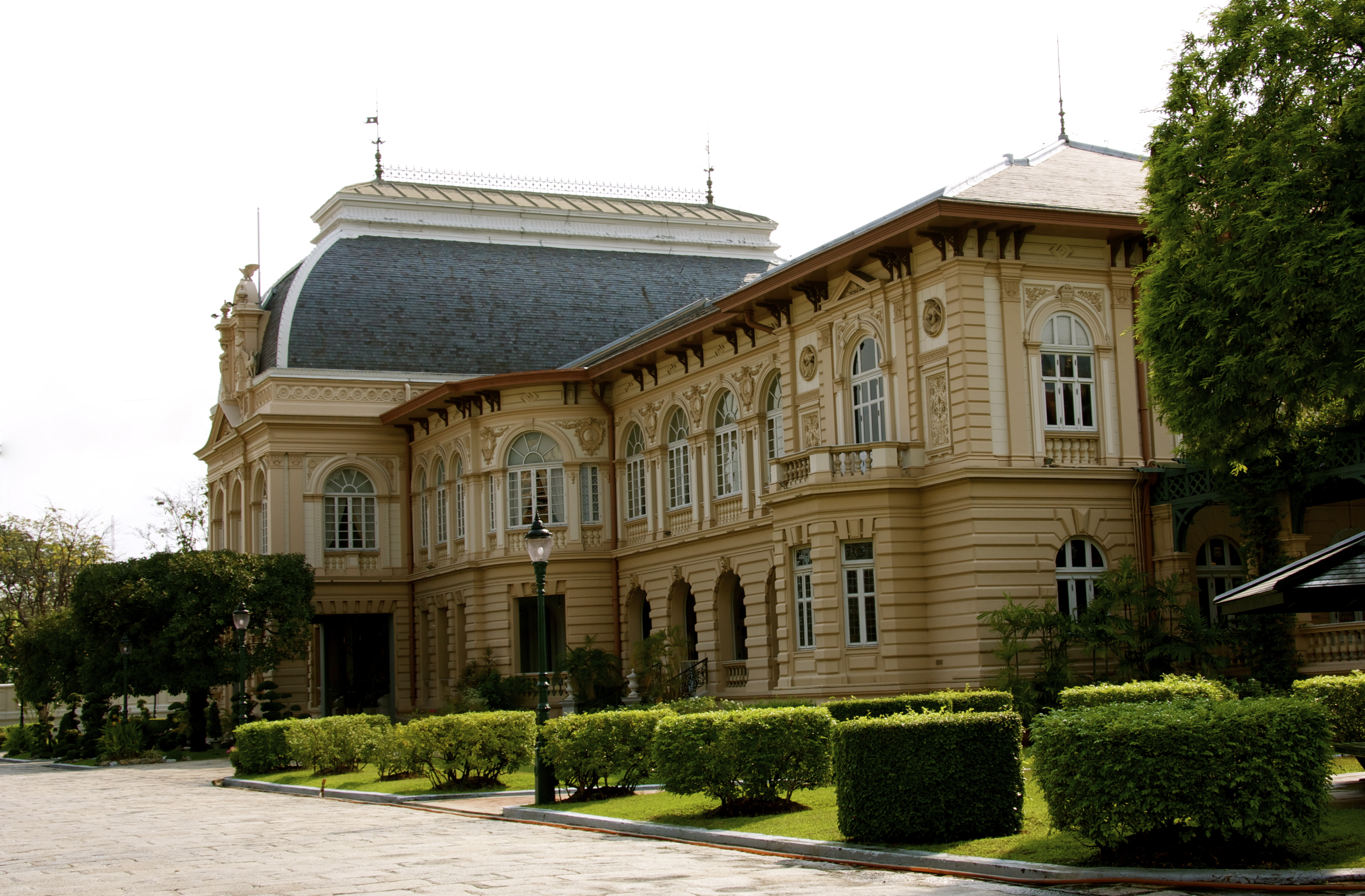
The Boromphiman Throne Hall in the Grand Palace. The king's bedroom is on the upper floor.

Keith Simpson, pathologist to the British Home Office and founding chairman of the Department of Forensic Medicine at Guy's Hospital in London, performed a forensic analysis of the king's death and recounted the following sequence of events on the morning of 9 June 1946:

- 06:00: Ananda was awakened by his mother.
- 07:30: His page, But Patthamasarin, came on duty and began preparing a breakfast table on a balcony adjoining the king's dressing room.
- 08:30: But Patthamasarin saw the king standing in his dressing room. He brought the king his customary glass of orange juice a few minutes later. However, by then the king had gone back to bed and refused the juice.
- 08:45: The king's other page, Chit Singhaseni, appeared, saying he had been called to measure the King's medals and decorations on behalf of a jeweller who was making a case for them.
- 09:00: Prince Bhumibol Adulyadej visited King Ananda. He said afterwards that he had found the king dozing in his bed.
- 09:20: A single shot rang out from the king's bedroom. Chit Singhaseni ran in and then ran out along the corridor to the apartment of the king's mother, crying "The King's shot himself!" The king's mother followed Chit Singhaseni into the king's bedroom and found the king lying face up in bed, bloodied from a wound to the head.

=== Aftermath ===
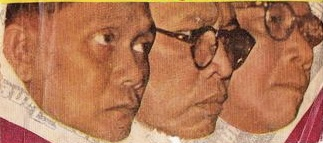
Three accused of murdering the king Chit Singhaseni, But Patthamasarin, and Chaliao Pathumrot

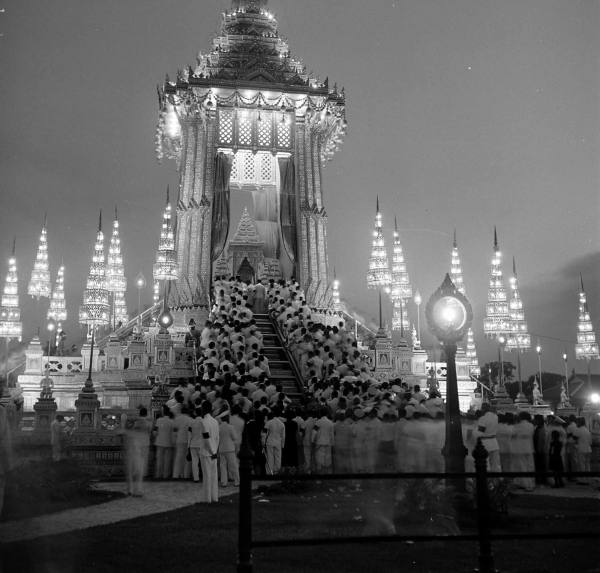
Cremation of King Ananda Mahidol, 1950

Monarchs of the Chakri dynasty
- Phutthayotfa Chulalok (Rama I)
- Phutthaloetla Naphalai (Rama II)
- Nangklao (Rama III)
- Mongkut (Rama IV)
- Chulalongkorn (Rama V)
- Vajiravudh (Rama VI)
- Prajadhipok (Rama VII)
- Ananda Mahidol (Rama VIII)
- Bhumibol Adulyadej (Rama IX)
- Vajiralongkorn (Rama X)

An initial radio announcement on 9 June surmised that the king was accidentally killed while toying with his pistol.

Soon after the death, the Democrat Party spread rumours that left-wing prime minister Pridi Banomyong was behind the death.

Following the change of prime minister, in October 1946, a Commission of Inquiry reported that the king's death could not have been accidental, but that neither suicide nor murder was satisfactorily proved.

In November 1947, Field Marshal Plaek Phibunsongkhram staged a coup against the elected government of Pridi, appointed Democrat Party leader Khuang Aphaiwong as Prime Minister, and ordered a trial. King Ananda's secretary, Senator Chaliao Pathumrot, and the pages, But and Chit, were arrested and charged with conspiracy to murder the king. After the coup, former Prime Minister Luang Thamrong privately confided to US Ambassador Edwin F. Stanton that the evidence gathered during investigations of the regicide implicated King Bhumibol in the late king's death.

The trial began in August 1948. Prior to the trial, Plaek Phibunsongkhram admitted to U.S. Ambassador Edwin F. Stanton that he was doubtful that the trial would resolve the mystery of Ananda Mahidol's death. The prosecution's case was supported by 124 witnesses and such voluminous documentary evidence that defence counsel asked for an adjournment to give them time to consider it. When this was refused the counsel resigned, and new counsel was found. Later, two of the defence counsel were arrested and charged with treason. Of the remaining two, one resigned, leaving only a single young lawyer for the defence, Fak Na Songkhla. Towards the end of the case he was joined by Chaliao Pathumrot's daughter, who had just graduated.

The lengthy trial finally ended in May 1951. The court ruled that King Ananda had been assassinated, but that Chaliao had not been proved guilty and that neither of the pages could have fired the fatal shot. However, they found Chit guilty of being party to the crime. The charges against Chaliao and But were dismissed and they were released.

Chit appealed his conviction, and the prosecution appealed the acquittal of Chaliao and But. After fifteen months of deliberation the Appeals Court dismissed Chit's appeal, and also found But guilty.

Chit and But appealed to the Supreme Court, which deliberated for ten more months before finally upholding both convictions, and this time convicting Chaliao as well.

The three men's petitions for clemency were rejected by King Rama IX (Bhumibol Adulyadej), and they were executed by firing squad on 17 February 1955. King Rama IX later said that he did not believe they were guilty.

King Ananda Mahidol was cremated at Sanam Luang, Bangkok, on 29 March 1950, four years after his death.

=== Alternative explanations of the death ===
The king's death is still considered a mystery. The subject is never openly discussed in Thailand's mainstream media. All of the principals known to have had some connection with the death are now deceased.

==== Bhumibol Adulyadej ====
On 15 June 1946, American Chargé d'affaires Charles Yost met with Foreign Minister Direk Jayanama, who had just had an audience with the new king, Bhumibol Adulyadej. In his report to the US State Department, Yost noted,

King Bhumiphol... informed the Foreign Minister that he considered the [widely circulated] rumors [on the late King's death] absurd, that he knew his brother well and that he was certain that his death had been accidental... What the King said to Direk does not necessarily represent what he really believes, it is nevertheless interesting that he made so categorical a statement to the Foreign Minister.

In 1948, Pinit Intaratood, who had just been appointed as the police officer in charge, went to the Villa Vadhana in Lausanne to question King Bhumibol. During the inquiry, the king looked gloomy, so Pinit decided to ask for forgiveness. The king was smiling and says:

I can't, even for a moment, stop missing him. I would have thought that we will never be apart throughout my lifetime. It was our destiny. I've never thought of being the king, [I] only want[ed] to be his brother.

However, in a 1980 BBC documentary, Bhumibol stated that although the court ruled that the death was 'proven' not an accident, "one doesn't know." He noted in English:

The investigation provided the fact that he died with a bullet wound in his forehead. It was proved that it was not an accident and not a suicide. One doesn't know. ... But what happened is very mysterious, because immediately much of the evidence was just shifted. And because it was political, so everyone was political, even the police were political, [it was] not very clear.

I only know [that] when I arrived he was dead. Many people wanted to advance not theories but facts to clear up the affair. They were suppressed. And they were suppressed by influential people in this country and in international politics.

==== Sulak Sivaraksa ====
Sulak Sivaraksa, a prominent conservative and monarchist, wrote that Pridi's role in the event was he protected a wrongdoing royal, and prevented an arrest of a person who destroyed the evidence. He wrote a Facebook post in 2015 claiming: "in truth, the murderer of King Rama VIII is not Pridi Banomyong. That person is still alive, even though not intending in doing so."

==== Seni Pramoj and the Democrat Party ====
Seni Pramoj and the Democrat Party spread rumours that Pridi was behind the death. Yost noted in a US State Department communication:

"... Within forty-eight hours after the death of the late King, two relatives of Seni Pramoj, first his nephew and later his wife, came to the Legation and stated categorically their conviction that the King had been assassinated at the instigation of the Prime Minister (Pridi Phanomyong). It was of course clear that they had been sent by Seni. I felt it necessary to state to both of them in the strongest terms, in order to make it perfectly clear that this Legation could not be drawn into Siamese political intrigues, that I did not believe these stories and that I considered the circulation at this time of fantastic rumors un-supported by a shred of evidence to be wholly in-excusable. The British Minister informed me this morning that he had also been approached by several members of the Opposition to whom he had stated that he accepted the official account of the King's death and that he would not be drawn into any further discussion of the matter.

==== Pridi Banomyong ====
On 14 June 1946, Yost met with Pridi Banomyong and made the following report to the US State Department:

"[Pridi spoke] very frankly about the whole situation and ascribed the King's death to an accident, but it was obvious that the possibility of suicide was at the back of his mind. [Pridi] was violently angry at the accusations of foul play leveled against himself and most bitter in the manner in which he alleged (without doubt justly) that the Royal Family and the Opposition, particularly Seni Pramoj and Phra Sudhiat, had prejudiced the King and especially the Princess Mother against him."

==== Plaek Pibulsonggram ====
After overthrowing Pridi Banomyong in a coup, Field Marshal Plaek Pibulsonggram told US Ambassador Edwin Stanton that he "personally doubted whether Pridi was directly involved for two reasons: firstly, ... Pridi is a very clever politician and secondly, ... he has a 'kind heart'." Pibul concluded to the Ambassador that "he did not think [Pridi] would cause anybody to be murdered. Pibul's wife, present in the meeting, seconded her husband's observations. However, Pibul noted that it was possible that Pridi had covered up or destroyed some of the evidence to protect the successor, Bhumibol Adulyadej."

==== Keith Simpson ====
Keith Simpson, a forensic pathologist who investigated the king's death, found it highly unlikely that the death was due to suicide, noting that:

- The pistol was found by the king's left hand, but he was right-handed.
- The direction of bullet fired was not inward towards the centre of the head.
- The wound, over the left eye, was not in one of the elective sites, nor a "contact" discharge.
- The king was killed while lying flat on his back. Simpson noted that in twenty years' experience he had never known of any suicide shooting while lying flat on the back.

==== William Stevenson ====
An account of the death is given in William Stevenson's The Revolutionary King, written with the co-operation of King Bhumibol Adulyadej. This account exculpates those executed and suggests that Ananda Mahidol was murdered by Tsuji Masanobu. Masanobu was a former Japanese intelligence officer who had been active in Thailand during the war and, at the time of Ananda Mahidol's death, was hiding out in Thailand for fear of being prosecuted for his war crimes.

Stevenson's account is that Ananda Mahidol could not have killed himself, either by suicide or by accident. He was found lying on his back in his bed, not wearing his glasses, without which he was almost blind. He had a small bullet wound in his forehead and a somewhat larger exit wound in the back of his head. His pistol, an M1911 given him by a former US Army officer, was not nearby. The M1911 is not especially prone to accidental discharge; it will fire only if considerable pressure is applied to the safety plate at the back of the butt at the same time as the trigger is depressed. It is a heavy pistol and awkward to use by an untrained person. It would have been almost impossible for Ananda Mahidol, a frail 20-year-old, to lie on his back and shoot himself in the forehead with such a weapon. Had he done so, the impact, according to forensics experts, would have blown his skull apart, not caused the small wounds seen by many witnesses. Stevenson writes that no cartridge case was found, and subsequent inquiries ordered by King Bhumibol, but suppressed by later governments, found that the Colt had not been fired.

==== Rayne Kruger ====
Another account, which concluded that Ananda Mahidol's death was the result of suicide, was explored by journalist Rayne Kruger in his book, The Devil's Discus. The book is banned in Thailand. However, a website by a Thai writer has provided a summary of Kruger's arguments, and it links to other material about the death. Kruger, who had unprecedented access to members of the inner circle of the Thai royal family (although these contacts had to remain unidentified), drew the conclusion that Ananda's death was most probably an 'accidental suicide'. Thus, said Kruger, it appears the sad, most likely accidental, death of the young king was exploited for the purposes of a political vendetta, and that three innocent victims were executed to maintain the façade.

==== Paul Handley ====
Paul Handley, author of a biography of King Bhumibol Adulyadej, wrote that either suicide or an accidental shooting by Prince Bhumibol was responsible for the king's death: "I have no idea whether Ananda shot himself or was killed by Bhumibol, the two possibilities most accepted among historians. If the latter, I clearly term it an accident that occurred in play".

== Tributes to Ananda Mahidol ==
Styles of: King Ananda Mahidol; Rama VIII of Thailand
- Reference style: His Majesty
- Spoken style: Your Majesty

Royal Monogram of King Ananda Mahidol

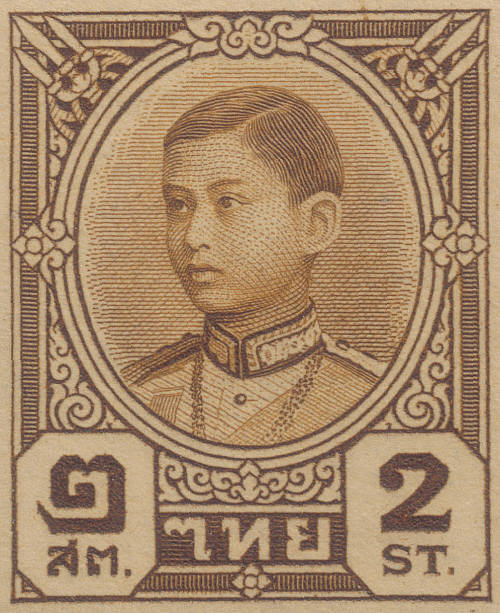
King Ananda Mahidol on a postage stamp

King Ananda Mahidol on Thai banknotes

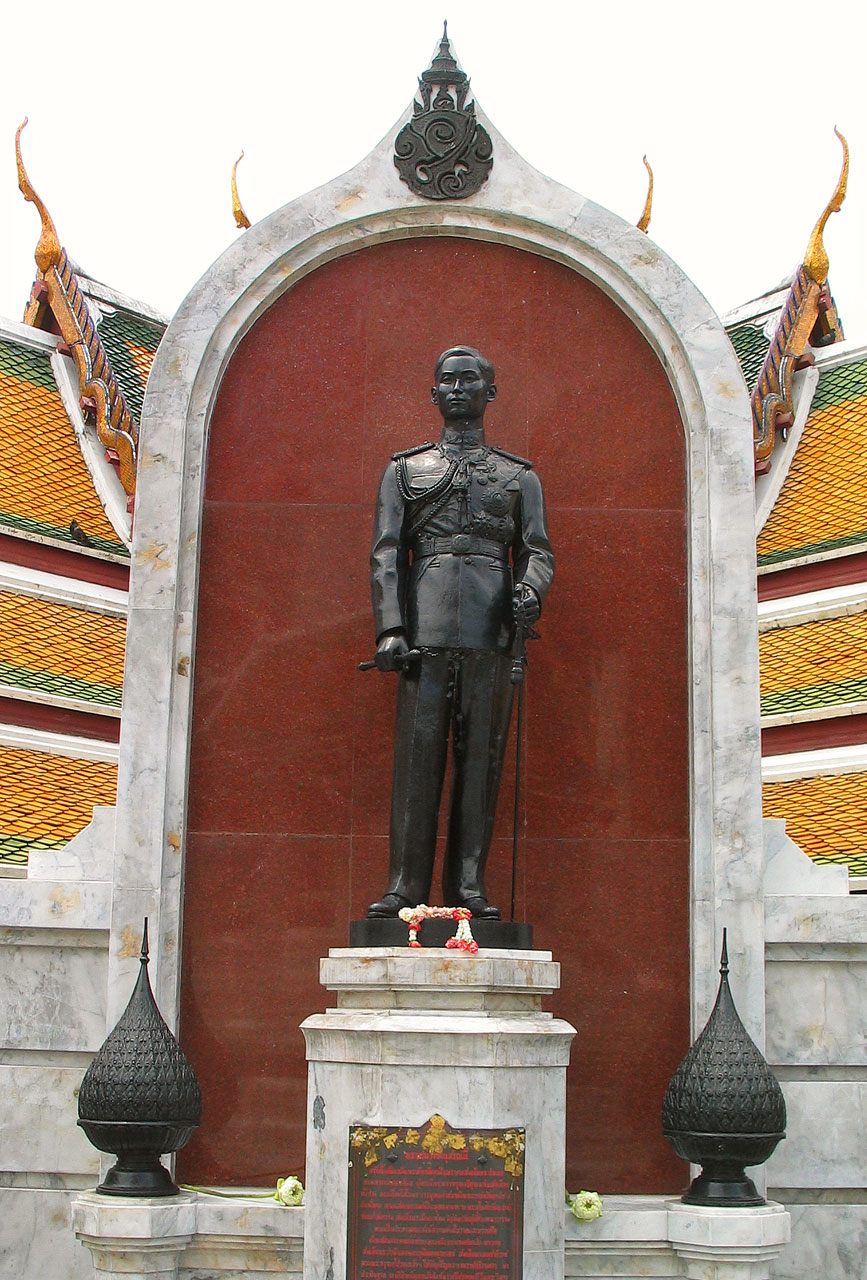
Statue of King Ananda, erected by his brother, King Bhumibol, Wat Suthat, Bangkok, 1959

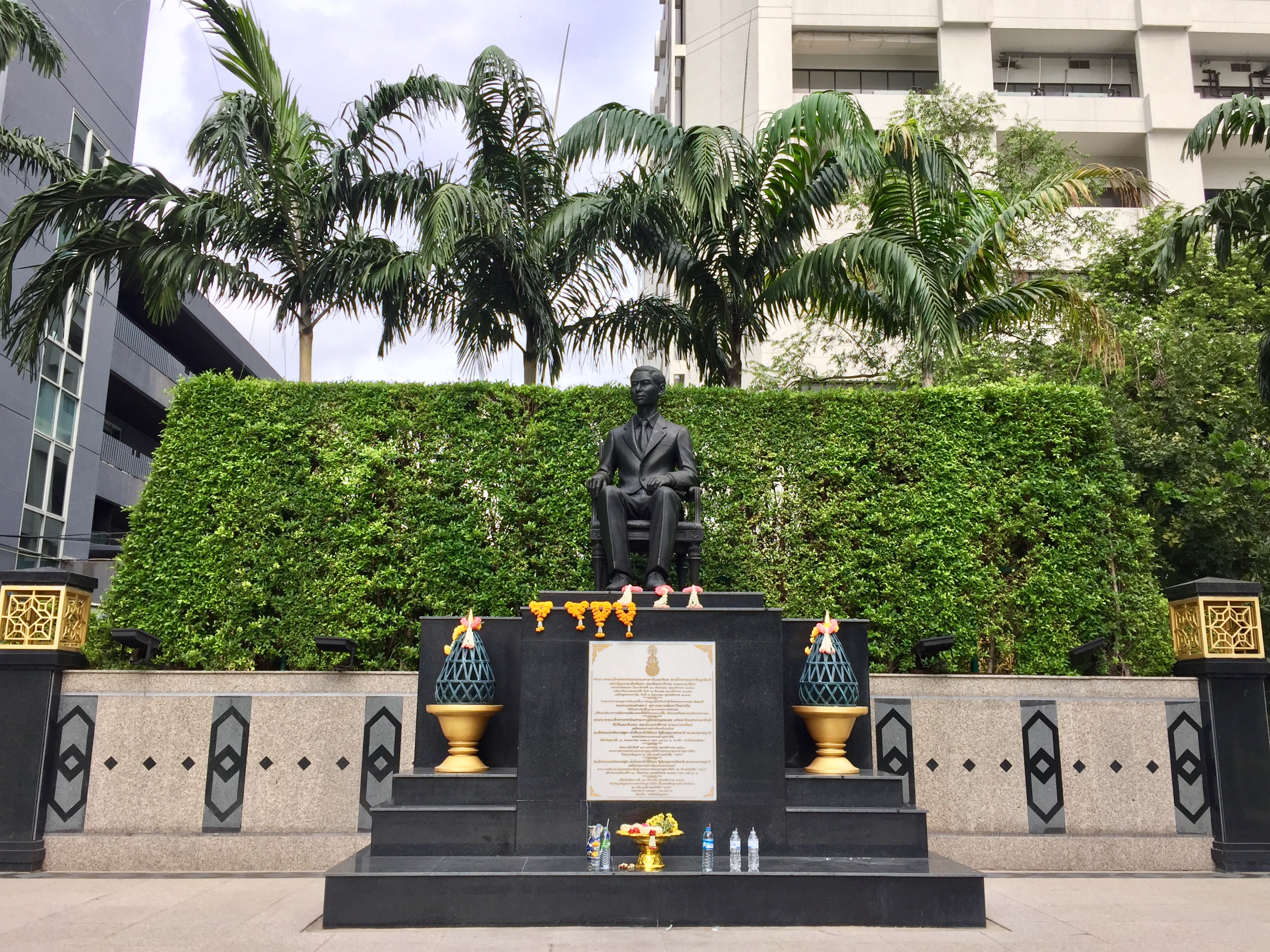
Statue of King Ananda, Faculty of Medicine, Chulalongkorn University

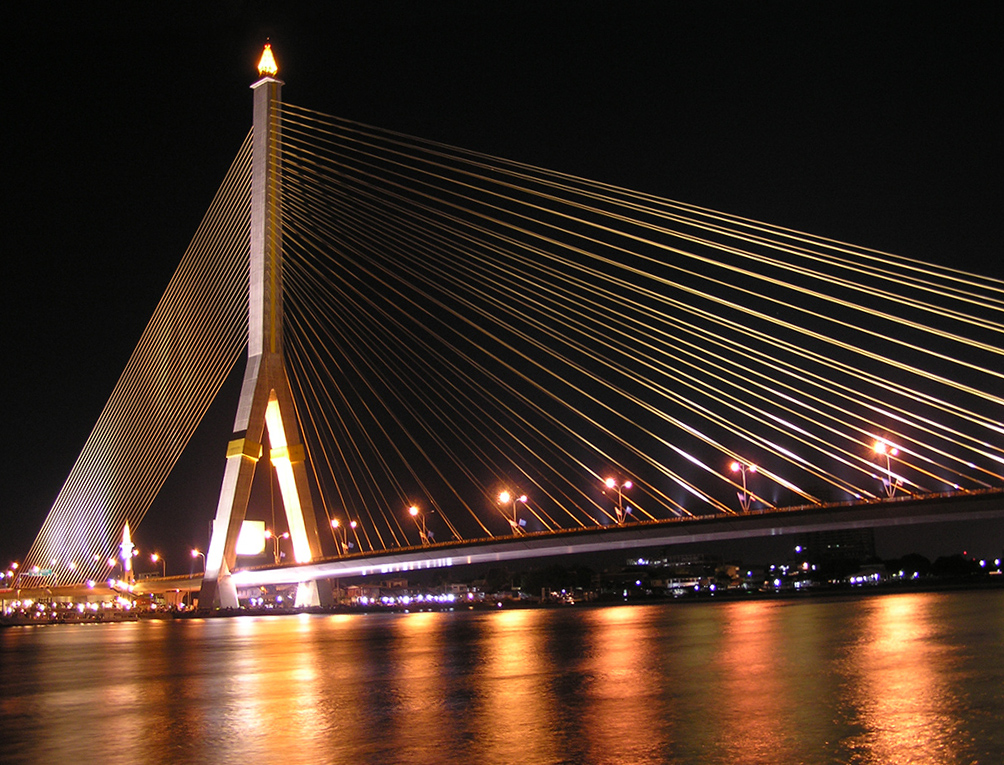
The Rama VIII Bridge across the Chao Phraya River, built in 2002

== Ancestry ==
Ancestors of Ananda Mahidol

8. (=10.) King Mongkut, Rama IV of Siam
4. King Chulalongkorn, Rama V of Siam
9. Princess Ramphoei Siriwong of Siam
2. Prince Mahidol Adulyadej, Prince of Songkhla
10. (=8.) King Mongkut, Rama IV of Siam
5. Princess Savang Vadhana of Siam
11. Piam Sucharitakul
1. King Ananda Mahidol, Rama VIII of Thailand
12. Chum Chukramol
6. Chu Chukramol
3. Sangwan Talapat
7. Kham
15. Pha

== See also ==
- History of Thailand (1932–1973)
- French-Thai War
- Japanese invasion of Thailand
- Free Thai Movement
- Rama VIII Bridge
- King Bhumibol Adulyadej
- List of unsolved deaths

== Notes ==
Ananda Mahidol (Rama VIII) House of Mahidol Cadet branch of the House of Chakri Born: 20 September 1925 Died: 9 June 1946
Regnal titles
| Preceded by Prajadhipok | King of Siam; 2 March 1935 – 23 June 1939 | Siam became "Thailand" |
| New title Siam became "Thailand" | King of Thailand; 23 June 1939 – 7 September 1945 | Thailand became "Siam" |
| New title Thailand became "Siam" | King of Siam; 7 September 1945 – 9 June 1946 | Succeeded by Bhumibol Adulyadej |
