= 1950 in Thailand =

- Decades: 1930s; 1940s; 1950s; 1960s; 1970s
- See also: Other events of 1950; Timeline of Thai history

The year 1950 was the 169th year of the Rattanakosin Kingdom of Thailand. It was the 5th year in the reign of King Bhumibol Adulyadej (Rama IX), and is reckoned as year 2493 in the Buddhist Era.

== Incumbents ==
- King: Bhumibol Adulyadej
- Regent: Rangsit Prayurasakdi, Phraya Manavaratsevi
- Crown Prince: (vacant)
- Prime Minister: Plaek Phibunsongkhram
- Supreme Patriarch: Vajirananavongs

== Events ==
=== April ===
- 28 April - His Majesty King Bhumibol Adulyadej married Mom Rajawongse Sirikit Kitiyakara in Lausanne.

=== May ===
- 5 May - The Coronation of His Majesty the King of Thailand Bhumibol Adulyadej takes place at the Phaisan Thaksin Hall in Bangkok.

== See also ==
- List of Thai films of 1950
