= Thephatsadin (disambiguation) =

The Devahastin family (also spelled Thephatsadin, Thephasadin, etc.) is a Thai family of royal descent.

Thephatsadin (or spelling variants) may also refer to:

- Phraya Thephatsadin (1878–1951), Thai military general
- Thephasadin Stadium, a stadium in Bangkok
