= Ratchasakun =

Ratchasakun (Thai: ราชสกุล) refers to the surnames indicating royal descent from a Thai monarch of the Chakri Dynasty, first established in 1912 after King Rama VI enacted a series of laws granting surnames to the Thai people, with the laws expressly stating that all Thai citizens must have a "surname" indicating who they are related to, or whom they are descended from, with those who are direct members of the royal bloodlines to be called ratchasakun, those who have marital ties to the royal family to be referred to as ratchanikun (ราชนิกุล), and those descended from a Chakri Front Palace to be called bowon ratchasakun (บวรราชสกุล).

== Ratchatrakul ==
Ratchatrakul (ราชตระกูล) are the royal houses which are descended directly from the siblings of King Rama I. This refers to those not of the immediate royal family, meaning those of the rank of Serene Highness (Mom Chao) or below. Untitled ratchasakun or spouses of ratchasakun shall take the suffix of na Ayudhya (modern alternatives: Na Ayutthaya) behind the surname as well, to signify royal heritage.

There are six ratchatrakul
Romanized Spelling	Modern/Alternative Spelling	Thai	Name of founder	Offspring
Narindrānkura na Ayudhya	Narintarangkur Na Ayutthaya	นรินทรางกูร ณ อยุธยา	HRH Prince Thongchin, the Prince (Kromma Luang) Narindhanarej	11 HSH Princes, 5 HSH Princesses
Devahastin na Ayudhya	Thephasadin Na Ayutthaya	เทพหัสดิน ณ อยุธยา	HRH Prince Tan, the Prince (Kromma Luang) Devahariraksa	6 HSH Princes, 1 HSH Princesses
Montrikul na Ayudhya	Montrikul Na Ayutthaya	มนตรีกุล ณ อยุธยา	HRH Prince Chui, the Prince (Kromma Luang) Bhitakmontri	15 HSH Princes, 22 HSH Princesses, 1 prince elevated to Phra Ong Chao (HH)
Isarānkura na Ayudhya	Isarangkur Na Ayutthaya	อิศรางกูร ณ อยุธยา	HRH Prince Khet, the Prince (Kromma Khun) Isarangkula Nhurak	26 HSH Princes, 41 HSH Princesses, 15 unknown princely descendants, 1 prince elevated to Phra Ong Chao (HH)
Cheshtānkura na Ayudhya	Jessadangkur Na Ayutthaya	เจษฎางกูร ณ อยุธยา	HRH Prince La, the Prince (Kromma Luang) Chakrachedha	8 HSH Princes, 9 HSH Princesses
Narindrakula na Ayudhya	Narintarakul Na Ayutthaya	นรินทรกุล ณ อยุธยา	HRH Princess Khu, the Princess (Kromma Luang) Narindharadevi	2 HRH Princes, Grandchildren of founder: 2 HSH Princes, 3 HSH Princesses

== Ratchasakun ==
Ratchasakun (ราชสกุล) refers to those who are directly descended from a Thai monarch. This refers to those not of the immediate royal family, meaning those of the rank of Serene Highness (Mom Chao) or below. Untitled ratchasakun or spouses of ratchasakun shall take the suffix of Na Ayudhya (modern alternatives: Na Ayutthaya) behind the surname as well, to signify royal heritage.

=== Royal Houses descended from Rama I ===
There are eight royal houses descended from King Rama I
Romanized Spelling	Modern/Alternative Spelling	Thai	Name of founder	Offspring
Chatrakul na Ayudhya	Chatrakul Na Ayutthaya	ฉัตรกุล ณ อยุธยา	HRH Prince Chat, the Prince (Kromma Muen) Surindhararak	9 HSH Princes, 16 HSH Princesses, 1 prince elevated to Phra Ong Chao (HH)
Duangchakra na Ayudhya	Duangchak Na Ayutthaya	ดวงจักร ณ อยุธยา	HRH Prince Duangchakra, the Prince (Kromma Muen) Narongharurak	2 HSH Princes, 3 HSH Princesses, 1 prince elevated to Phra Ong Chao (HH)
Tārākara na Ayudhya	Darakorn Na Ayutthaya	ดารากร ณ อยุธยา	HRH Prince Darakara, the Prince (Kromma Muen) Sri Suthep	4 HSH Princes, 5 HSH Princesses, 1 prince elevated to Phra Ong Chao (HH)
Dabbakula na Ayudhya	Tappakul Na Ayutthaya	ทัพพะกุล ณ อยุธยา	HRH Prince Thap, the Prince (Kromma Muen) Chidhrapakdi	1 HSH Princes, 5 HSH Princesses
Phungbun na Ayudhya	Pungbun Na Ayutthaya	พึ่งบุญ ณ อยุธยา	HRH Prince Kraison, the Prince (Kromma Luang) Rakronares	5 HSH Princes, 5 HSH Princesses; Branch family: Aniruddhadeva family (สกุลอนิรุทธเทวา)
Sudasna na Ayudhya	Sutat Na Ayutthaya	สุทัศน์ ณ อยุธยา	HRH Prince Sutat, the Prince (Kromma Muen) Kraison Vichit	12 HSH Princes, 10 HSH Princesses
Suriyakul na Ayudhya	Suriyakul Na Ayutthaya	สุริยกุล ณ อยุธยา	HRH Prince Suriya, the Prince (Krom Phra) Ramisarej	11 HSH Princes, 19 HSH Princesses, 4 unknown princely descendants
Indrāngura na Ayudhya	Intarangkur Na Ayutthaya	อินทรางกูร ณ อยุธยา	HRH Prince Tuptim, the Prince (Kromma Muen) Intaraphibhit	7 HSH Princes, 1 HSH Princesses

=== Royal Houses descended from Rama II ===
There are twenty royal houses descended from King Rama II
Romanized Spelling	Modern/Alternative Spelling	Thai	Name of founder	Offspring
Kapitthā na Ayudhya	Kapita Na Ayutthaya	กปิตถา ณ อยุธยา	HRH Prince Kapittha, the Prince (Kromma Muen) Bhubalborirak	3 HSH Princes, 5 HSH Princesses
Klauaymai na Ayudhya	Kluaymai Na Ayutthaya	กล้วยไม้ ณ อยุธยา	HRH Prince Kluai Mai, the Prince (Kromma Muen) Sundhorndhibodi	8 HSH Princes, 4 HSH Princesses
Kunjara na Ayudhya	Kunchorn Na Ayutthaya	กุญชร ณ อยุธยา	HRH Prince Kunjara, the Prince (Krom Phra) Bidaksadevesh	11 HSH Princes, 14 HSH Princesses, 1 prince elevated to Phra Ong Chao (HH)
Kusuma na Ayudhya	Kusuma Na Ayutthaya	กุสุมา ณ อยุธยา	HRH Prince Kusuma, the Prince (Kromma Muen) Sebsundhorn	4 HSH Princes, 14 HSH Princesses
Xumsaeng na Ayudhya	Chumsaeng Na Ayutthaya	ชุมแสง ณ อยุธยา	HRH Prince Jumsaeng, the Prince (Kromma Luang) Sarbasilpaprija	10 HSH Princes, 7 HSH Princesses
Tejātivongse na Ayudhya	Dejatiwong Na Ayutthaya	เดชาติวงศ์ ณ อยุธยา	HRH Prince Mung, the Prince (Krom Phraya) Tejatisorn	6 HSH Princes, 3 HSH Princesses, 1 princess elevated to Phra Ong Chao (HH)
Dinakara na Ayudhya	Tinnakorn Na Ayutthaya	ทินกร ณ อยุธยา	HRH Prince Dinakara, the Prince (Kromma Luang) Bhuvaneta Narindrariddhi	15 HSH Princes, 9 HSH Princesses
Niyamisara na Ayudhya	Niyamit Na Ayutthaya	นิยมิศร ณ อยุธยา	HRH Prince Niam	3 HSH Princes, 2 HSH Princesses
Nilaratna na Ayudhya	Nilrat Na Ayutthaya	นิลรัตน์ ณ อยุธยา	HRH Prince Nilaratna, the Prince (Kromma Muen) Alongkotkitprija	8 HSH Princes, 9 HSH Princesses
Pramoja na Ayudhya	Pramoj Na Ayutthaya	ปราโมช ณ อยุธยา	HRH Prince Pramoj, the Prince (Kromma Khun) Vorachakra Dharanubhap	29 HSH Princes, 24 HSH Princesses, 1 unknown princely descendant, 2 princes elevated to Phra Ong Chao (HH)
Phanomvan na Ayudhya	Panomwan Na Ayutthaya	พนมวัน ณ อยุธยา	HRH Prince Banomwan, the Prince (Krom Phra) Bibidhbhogabhubendra	6 HSH Princes, 5 HSH Princesses, 1 unknown princely descendant, 1 princes elevated to Phra Ong Chao (HH)
Baidurya na Ayudhya	Paitun Na Ayutthaya	ไพฑูรย์ ณ อยุธยา	HRH Prince Baidurya, the Prince (Kromma Muen) Sanidnarendra	3 HSH Princes, 8 HSH Princesses
Morakot na Ayudhya	Morakot Na Ayutthaya	มรกฎ ณ อยุธยา	HRH Prince Morakot, the Prince (Kromma Khun) Sathityasathaborn	4 HSH Princes, 7 HSH Princesses
Mahākul na Ayudhya	Mahakul Na Ayutthaya	มหากุล ณ อยุธยา	HRH Prince To, the Prince (Kromma Luang) Mahisvarindramaresra	9 HSH Princes, 6 HSH Princesses
Mālakul na Ayudhya	Malakul Na Ayutthaya	มาลากุล ณ อยุธยา	HRH Prince Mahamala, the Prince (Krom Phraya) Bamrapparapaksa	2 HSH Princes, 2 HSH Princesses, 2 princes elevated to Phra Ong Chao (HH)
Renunandana na Ayudhya	Renunand Na Ayutthaya	เรณุนันทน์ ณ อยุธยา	HRH Prince Renu	3 HSH Princes, 12 HSH Princesses
Vajrivansa na Ayudhya	Wachariwong Na Ayutthaya	วัชรีวงศ์ ณ อยุธยา	HRH Prince Klang, the Prince (Krom Phra) Deveshvajrindra	9 HSH Princes, 15 HSH Princesses, 1 prince elevated to Phra Ong Chao (HH)
Snidvongs na Ayudhya	Sanitwong Na Ayutthaya	สนิทวงศ์ ณ อยุธยา	HRH Prince Nuam, the Prince (Kromma Luang) Vongsadhiraj Snid	21 HSH Princes, 31 HSH Princesses, 3 prince elevated to Phra Ong Chao (HH)
Arunvongse na Ayudhya	Arunwong Na Ayutthaya	อรุณวงษ์ ณ อยุธยา	HRH Prince Arunvongse, the Prince (Kromma Luang) Vorasaktabisala	6 HSH Princes, 7 HSH Princesses
Abharanakul na Ayudhya	Aponkul Na Ayutthaya	อาภรณ์กุล ณ อยุธยา	HRH Prince Abhorn	7 HSH Princes, 2 HSH Princesses

=== Royal Houses descended from Rama III ===
There are 13 royal houses descended from King Rama III
Romanized Spelling	Modern/Alternative Spelling	Thai	Name of founder	Offspring
Komen na Ayudhya	Komen Na Ayutthaya	โกเมน ณ อยุธยา	HRH Prince Komaen, the Prince (Kromma Muen) Chedha Dhibentra	1 HSH Princes, 5 HSH Princesses, 3 unknown princely descendants
Ganechara na Ayudhya	Kanaejorn Na Ayutthaya	คเนจร ณ อยุธยา	HRH Prince Kanaejara, the Prince (Kromma Muen) Amarenot Dharabodin	17 HSH Princes, 13 HSH Princesses
Ngon-rath na Ayudhya	Ngonrod Na Ayutthaya	งอนรถ ณ อยุธยา	HRH Prince Ngon-rath	1 HSH Princes, 1 unknown princely descendant
Jambūnud na Ayudhya	Chompunut Na Ayutthaya	ชมพูนุท ณ อยุธยา	HRH Prince Chumbanud, the Prince (Kromma Khun) Charoenbol Bulsawat	3 HSH Princes (included Jinavara Sirivaddhana, the Supreme Patriarch of Siam), 2 HSH Princesses, 1 prince elevated to Phra Ong Chao (HH)
Xumsai na Ayudhya	Chumsai Na Ayutthaya	ชุมสาย ณ อยุธยา	HRH Prince Chumsai, the Prince (Kromma Khun) Rajasrihavikrom	4 HSH Princes, 4 HSH Princesses, 1 prince elevated to Phra Ong Chao (HH)
Piyakara na Ayudhya	Piyakorn Na Ayutthaya	ปิยากร ณ อยุธยา	HRH Prince Piak	1 HSH Princes, 3 HSH Princesses
Latāvalya na Ayudhya	Ladawal Na Ayutthaya	ลดาวัลย์ ณ อยุธยา	HRH Prince Ladawala, the Prince (Kromma Khun) Bhumintra Pakdi	14 HSH Princes, 25 HSH Princesses, 1 unknown princely descendant 1 prince elevated to Phra Ong Chao (HH), 3 princesses elevated to Phra Ong Chao (HH)
Lamyong na Ayudhya	Lamyong Na Ayutthaya	ลำยอง ณ อยุธยา	HRH Prince Lamyong	1 HSH Princes, 3 HSH Princesses
Sirivongse na Ayudhya	Siriwong Na Ayutthaya	ศิริวงศ์ ณ อยุธยา	HRH Prince Siriwongse, the Prince (Kromma Muen) Matyabidhak	3 HSH Princes, 6 HSH Princesses; 3 princes and 4 princesses elevated to Phra Ong Chao (HH), 1 princess elevated to HM the Queen
Sinharā na Ayudhya	Singhra Na Ayutthaya	สิงหรา ณ อยุธยา	HRH Prince Singara, the Prince (Kromma Luang) Bondintarapaisal Soboen	10 HSH Princes, 16 HSH Princesses
Suparna na Ayudhya	Subhan Na Ayutthaya	สุบรรณ ณ อยุธยา	HRH Prince Subhara, the Prince (Kromma Khun) Bondintarapaisal Soboen	7 HSH Princes, 6 HSH Princesses
Arnob na Ayudhya	Anop Na Ayutthaya	อรรณพ ณ อยุธยา	HRH Prince Anobhra, the Prince (Kromma Muen) Udomradharasri	5 HSH Princes, 1 HSH Princesses
Uraibongse na Ayudhya	Uraipong Na Ayutthaya	อุไรพงศ์ ณ อยุธยา	HRH Prince Urai, the Prince (Kromma Muen) Udulyalaks Sombati	8 HSH Princes, 8 HSH Princesses; 1 prince elevated to Phra Ong Chao (HH)

=== Royal Houses descended from Rama IV ===
There are 27 royal houses descended from King Rama IV
Romanized Spelling	Modern/Alternative Spelling	Thai	Name of founder	Offspring	Order*	Status
Kamalāsana na Ayudhya	Komalad Na Ayutthaya	กมลาศน์ ณ อยุธยา	HRH Prince Kamalasana Loe Sarga, the Prince (Kromma Muen) Rajasakdi Samoson	14 HSH Princes, 13 HSH Princesses	8	
Kritākara na Ayudhya	Kridakorn Na Ayutthaya	กฤดากร ณ อยุธยา	HRH Prince Krida Bhinihan, the Prince (Krom Phra) Naretraworit	15 HSH Princes, 6 HSH Princesses; 2 princes elevated to Phra Ong Chao (HH)	—	
Kshemasrī na Ayudhya	Kasemsri Na Ayutthaya	เกษมศรี ณ อยุธยา	HRH Prince Kashemsri Subhayok, the Prince (Kromma Muen) Tivakarawongse Pravati	18 HSH Princes, 12 HSH Princesses; 1 prince elevated to Phra Ong Chao (HH); 1 princess gave up her rank to marry a commoner	9	
Kshemasanta na Ayudhya	Kasemsant Na Ayutthaya	เกษมสันต์ ณ อยุธยา	HRH Prince Kashemsanta Sobhaga, the Prince (Kromma Luang) Bhramavaranuraksh	43 HSH Princes, 25 HSH Princesses, 3 unknown princely descendants 2 princesses gave up ranks to marry commoners	7	
Gaganānga na Ayudhya	Kukanang Na Ayutthaya	คัคณางค์ ณ อยุธยา	HRH Prince Gagananga Yukala, the Prince (Kromma Luang) Bijitprijakara]]	2 HSH Princes, 4 HSH Princesses; 1 princess elevated to Phra Ong Chao (HH)	—	Extinct
Chakrabandhu na Ayudhya	Chakraband Na Ayutthaya	จักรพันธุ์ ณ อยุธยา	HRH Prince Chaturonrasmi, the Prince (Krom Phra) Chakrabartibongse	7 HSH Princes, 9 HSH Princesses; 1 unknown princely descendant 2 princes and 3 princesses elevated to Phra Ong Chao First Class (HRH); 12 elevated to Phra Ong Chao (HH)	1	
Chitrabongs na Ayudhya	Chitrapong Na Ayutthaya	จิตรพงศ์ ณ อยุธยา	HRH Prince Chitracharoen, the Prince (Krom Phraya) Narisara Nuwattiwong	5 HSH Princes, 4 HSH Princesses	21	
Jayānkura na Ayudhya	Chayangkul Na Ayutthaya	ชยางกูร ณ อยุธยา	HRH Prince Jayanujit, the Prince (Kromma Muen) Bongsadisramahip	15 HSH Princes, 8 HSH Princesses; 2 princesses gave up royal titles to marry commoners (Chayangkul)	16	
Jumbala na Ayudhya	Chumpol Na Ayutthaya	ชุมพล ณ อยุธยา	HRH Prince Jumbalasomboj, the Prince (Kromma Luang) Sarbasiddhiprasong	11 HSH Princes, 3 HSH Princesses	12	
Sridawadrawong na Ayudhya	Srisaeng Na Ayutthaya	ศรีแสง ณ อยุธยา	HRH Prince Jaiyanta Sridawadrawong, the Prince (Kromma Muen) srisirirattanachai, (Commoner) Mom Luang Chakwarritthanon Srisaeng	5 HSH Princes, 3 HSH Princesses; 5 elevated to Phra Ong Chao (HH) 2 princes and 1 princess gave up royal title to marry commoners (Srisaeng)	24	
Tisakula na Ayudhya	Diskul Na Ayutthaya	ดิศกุล ณ อยุธยา	HRH Prince Tisavarakumarn, the Prince (Krom Phraya) Damrong Rajanubhab	14 HSH Princes, 23 HSH Princesses; 1 princess gave up her title to marry a commoner	18	
Dvivongs na Ayudhya	Taviwong Na Ayutthaya	ทวีวงศ์ ณ อยุธยา	HRH Prince Dvithavalyalabh, the Prince (Krom Muen) Bhudharesh Damrongsakdi	6 HSH Princes, 9 HSH Princesses	5	
Thongthaem na Ayudhya	Tongtaem Na Ayutthaya	ทองแถม ณ อยุธยา	HRH Prince Thongtaem Thavalyavongse, the Prince (Krom Luang) Sarbashatra Subhakij	9 HSH Princes, 9 HSH Princesses	11	
Thongyai na Ayudhya	Tongyai Na Ayutthaya	ทองใหญ่ ณ อยุธยา	HRH Prince Thongkongkonyai, the Prince (Krom Luang) Prachak Silapakhom	11 HSH Princes, 15 HSH Princesses; 1 princess gave up royal rank to marry a commoner	6	
Devakula na Ayudhya	Devakul Na Ayutthaya	เทวกุล ณ อยุธยา	HRH Prince Devan Udayavongse, the Prince (Krom Phraya) Devawongse Varopakarn	25 HSH Princes, 23 HSH Princesses; 1 prince elevated to Phra Ong Chao (HH), Prince (Kromma Muen)	13	
Navavongsa	Nopawongs Na Ayutthaya	นพวงศ์ ณ อยุธยา	HRH Prince Nobavongse, the Prince (Kromma Muen) Mahesvara Sivavilas	15 HSH Princes, 7 HSH Princesses; 2 princes elevated to Phra Ong Chao (HH); 1 Mom Rajawongse elevated to Phra Ong Chao (HRH Prince Vajirananavongse, the Supreme Patriarch of Thailand)	—	
Varavarna na Ayudhya	Worawan Na Ayutthaya	วรวรรณ ณ อยุธยา	HRH Prince Voravannakara, the Prince (Krom Phra) Naradhip Prabandhabongse	19 HSH Princes, 14 HSH Princesses; 1 prince and 1 princess elevated to Phra Ong Chao (HH); 1 princess became a royal consort 2 princess gave up royal titles to marry commoners	12	
Vadhanavongs na Ayudhya	Watthanawong Na Ayutthaya	วัฒนวงศ์ ณ อยุธยา	HRH Prince Vadhanavongs, the Prince (Kromma Khun) Marubongse Siribaddhana	4 HSH Princes, 3 HSH Princesses	22	
Sridhavaja na Ayudhya	Sridavaj Na Ayutthaya	ศรีธวัช ณ อยุธยา	HRH Prince Srisiddhi Tongchai, the Prince (Kromma Khun) Siridhaj Sangkash	5 HSH Princes, 2 HSH Princesses; 7 unknown princely descendants	10	
Sukhasvasti na Ayudhya	Suksavat Na Ayutthaya	ศุขสวัสดิ ณ อยุธยา	HRH Prince Sukhasvasti, the Prince (Kromma Luang) Adisorn Udomdej	23 HSH Princes, 14 HSH Princesses; 1 prince and 1 princess elevated to Phra Ong Chao (HH)	4	
Sobhanga na Ayudhya	Sobang Na Ayutthaya	โศภางค์ ณ อยุธยา	HRH Prince Srisaovabanga	2 HSH Princes, 1 HSH Princesses	19	
Svastikula na Ayudhya	Savatikul Na Ayutthaya	สวัสดิกุล ณ อยุธยา	HRH Prince Svastipravati, the Prince (Krom Phra) Sommot Amarabandhu	2 HSH Princes, 1 HSH Princesses	14	
Svastivatana na Ayudhya	Sawastivat Na Ayutthaya	สวัสดิวัตน์ ณ อยุธยา	HRH Prince Svasti Sobhana, the Prince (Krom Phra) Svastivatana Vishishta	22 HSH Princes, 24 HSH Princesses; 2 unknown princely descendants 1 HSH Princess elevated to HM the Queen Rambai Barni; 6 princesses gave up royal titles to marry commoners	23	
Supratishtha na Ayudhya	Supradit Na Ayutthaya	สุประดิษฐ์ ณ อยุธยา	HRH Prince Supratishtha, the Prince (Kromma Muen) Vishnunatha Nibhadhara	5 HSH Princes, 9 HSH Princesses; 1 princess elevated to Phra Ong Chao (HH)	—	
Sonakul na Ayudhya	Sonakul Na Ayutthaya	โสณกุล ณ อยุธยา	HRH Prince Sonapandit, the Prince (Kromma Khun) Bhidyalabh Bridhidhata	8 HSH Princes, 5 HSH Princesses; 1 prince elevated to Phra Ong Chao (HH)	20	

*Order column derived from the original numerical order taken by Rama VI when granting surnames. Some were omitted from the original count by the king:

Kritākara: Not counted in Rama VI's specific order, granted as the 721st surname.

Gaganānga: No surviving male descendants at the time of granting.

Navavongsa: Not counted by Rama VI in his specific order, but granted as the 226th surname.

Supratishtha: Not counted by Rama VI in his specific order, granted as the 1403rd surname.

=== Royal Houses descended from Rama V ===
There are 15 royal houses descended from King Rama V
Romanized Spelling	Modern/Alternative Spelling	Thai	Name of founder	Offspring	Sources
Kitiyākara na Ayudhya	Kitiyakorn Na Ayutthaya	กิติยากร ณ อยุธยา	HRH Prince Kitiyakara Voralaksana, the Prince of Chanthaburi	13 HSH Princes, 12 HSH Princesses; 1 prince elevated to Phra Ong Chao (HH); 1 Mom Rajawongse elevated to HM the Queen; 1 Mom Luang elevated to Phra Ong Chao First Class (HRH)	
Rabībadhana na Ayudhya	Rabibadh Na Ayutthaya	รพีพัฒน์ ณ อยุธยา	HRH Prince Rabhi Phattanasuk, the Prince of Ratchaburi	6 HSH Princes, 7 HSH Princesses; 2 princesses gave up royal ranks to marry commoners	
Pavitra na Ayudhya	Pravit Na Ayutthaya	ประวิตร ณ อยุธยา	HRH Prince Pravitra Vadhanodom, the Prince of Prachinburi	5 HSH Princes, 2 HSH Princesses	
Chirapravati na Ayudhya	Jirapravat Na Ayutthaya	จิรประวัติ ณ อยุธยา	HRH Prince Chirapravati Voradej, the Prince of Nakhon Chaisi	4 HSH Princes, 2 HSH Princesses	
Ābhākara na Ayudhya	Abhakorn Na Ayutthaya	อาภากร ณ อยุธยา	HRH Prince Abhakara Kiartivongse, the Prince of Chumpon	9 HSH Princes, 4 HSH Princesses; 1 prince elevated to Phra Ong Chao First Class (HRH); 3 princesses gave up royal ranks to marry commoners	
Paribatra na Ayudhya	Boripat Na Ayutthaya	บริพัตร ณ อยุธยา	HRH Prince Paribatra Sukhumbandhu, the Prince of Nakhon Sawan	9 HSH Princes, 4 HSH Princesses; 1 prince elevated to Phra Ong Chao First Class (HRH); 3 princesses gave up royal ranks to marry commoners	
Chatra-jaya na Ayudhya	Chatchai Na Ayutthaya	ฉัตรไชย ณ อยุธยา	HRH Prince Purachatra Jayakara, the Prince of Kampaengphet	4 HSH Princes, 8 HSH Princesses; 1 prince and 3 princesses elevated to Phra Ong Chao (HH); 3 princesses gave up royal ranks to marry commoners	
Beñ-badhana na Ayudhya	Penpat Na Ayutthaya	เพ็ญพัฒน์ ณ อยุธยา	HRH Prince Benbadhanabongse, the Prince of Phichai	2 HSH Princes, 1 HSH Princesses; 1 princess gave up royal rank to marry commoners	
Chakrabongse na Ayudhya	Chakrabongs Na Ayutthaya	จักรพงษ์ ณ อยุธยา	HRH Prince Chakrabongse Bhuvanath, the Prince of Phitsanulok	1 HSH Prince; Elevated to the rank of Phra Ong Chao First Class (HRH)	
Yugala na Ayudhya	Yukol Na Ayutthaya	ยุคล ณ อยุธยา	HRH Prince Yugala Dighambara, the Prince of Lopburi	3 HRH Princes (children); 9 HSH Princes, 10 HSH Princesses (grandchildren); 1 HSH Prince elevated to Phra Ong Chao (HH) 7 princesses gave up their royal rank to marry commoners (1 reinstated)	
Vudhijaya na Ayudhya	Wuthichai Na Ayutthaya	วุฒิชัย ณ อยุธยา	HRH Prince Vudhijaya Chalermlabha, the Prince of Singburi	5 HSH Princes, 7 HSH Princesses; 3 princesses gave up their ranks to marry commoners	
Suriyong na Ayudhya	Suriyong Na Ayutthaya	สุริยง ณ อยุธยา	HRH Prince Suriyong Prayurabandhu, the Prince of Chaiya	9 HSH Princes, 3 HSH Princesses; 2 princesses gave up their ranks to marry commoners	
Rangsit na Ayudhya	Rangsit Na Ayutthaya	รังสิต ณ อยุธยา	HRH Prince Rangsit Prayurasakdi, the Prince of Chai Nat	2 HSH Princes, 1 HSH Princess; 1 princesses gave up their ranks to marry commoners	
Mahitala na Ayudhya	Mahidol Na Ayutthaya	มหิดล ณ อยุธยา	HRH Prince Mahidol Adulyadej, the Prince Father, Prince of Songkhla	The current ruling house of Thailand. Notable figures include King Rama VIII, King Bhumibol Adulyadej and the current reigning monarch, King Maha Vajiralongkorn; 3 Kings of Thailand; 1 Crown Prince; 2 Chao Fa (HRH) Princesses (grandchildren) 1 Chao Fa Prince, 1 Chao Fa Princess, 2 Phra Ong Chao 1st Class (HRH) Princesses (great-grandchildren) 1 Chao Fa Princess gave up royal title (HRH) to marry commoner 4 HSH Princes degraded from royalty	
Chudādhuj na Ayudhya	Chudadhuj Na Ayutthaya	จุฑาธุช ณ อยุธยา	HRH Prince Chudadhuj Dharadilok, the Prince of Petchabun	1 HSH Prince, 1 HSH Princess; Both elevated to Phra Ong Chao (HH)	

=== Royal Houses descended from Rama VII ===
There is only one royal house descended from King Rama VII
Royal House	Founder	Additional Information
Sakdidejna Bhānubandhu na Ayudhya (Modern Alternative: Saktidej Bhanubandh Na Ayutthaya ไทย: ศักดิเดชน์ ภาณุพันธุ์ ณ อยุธยา)	His Highness Prince Chirasakdi Suprabhas	He was the youngest son of HRH Prince Bhanurangsi Savangwongse, and was the adopted son of King Rama VII HH Prince Jirasakdi Suprapas married Mom Manee, and when Mom Manee became pregnant, his adoptive father, King Rama VII gave him the royal surname Sakdidejna from his own royal name Prajadipok Sakdidejna, but due to political conflicts in Thailand, the new government officials did not allow this, citing royal lineage laws as a reason, so the prince used the surname "Sakdidej Bhanubandhu" instead

== Sources ==
This is a direct translation of the Thai language Wikipedia page.

- Galyani Vadhana (2004). มหามกุฎราชสันตติวงศ์ พระนามพระราชโอรสธิดา พระราชนัดดา (in Thai). Bangkok: อมรินทร์พริ้นติ้ง. ISBN 974-272-911-5.
- Galyani Vadhana (2005). จุฬาลงกรณราชสันตติวงศ์ พระนามพระราชโอรส พระราชธิดา และพระราชนัดดา (in Thai). Bangkok: สำนักพิมพ์บรรณกิจ. ISBN 974-221-746-7.
- ธำรงศักดิ์ อายุวัฒนะ (2001). ราชสกุลจักรีวงศ์ และราชสกุลสมเด็จพระเจ้าตากสินมหาราช (in Thai). Bangkok: สำนักพิมพ์บรรณกิจ. ISBN 974-222-648-2.
