= Phraya Manavaratsevi =

Regent of Thailand

Phraya Manavaratsevi PCh MPCh MVM
- พระยามานวราชเสวี
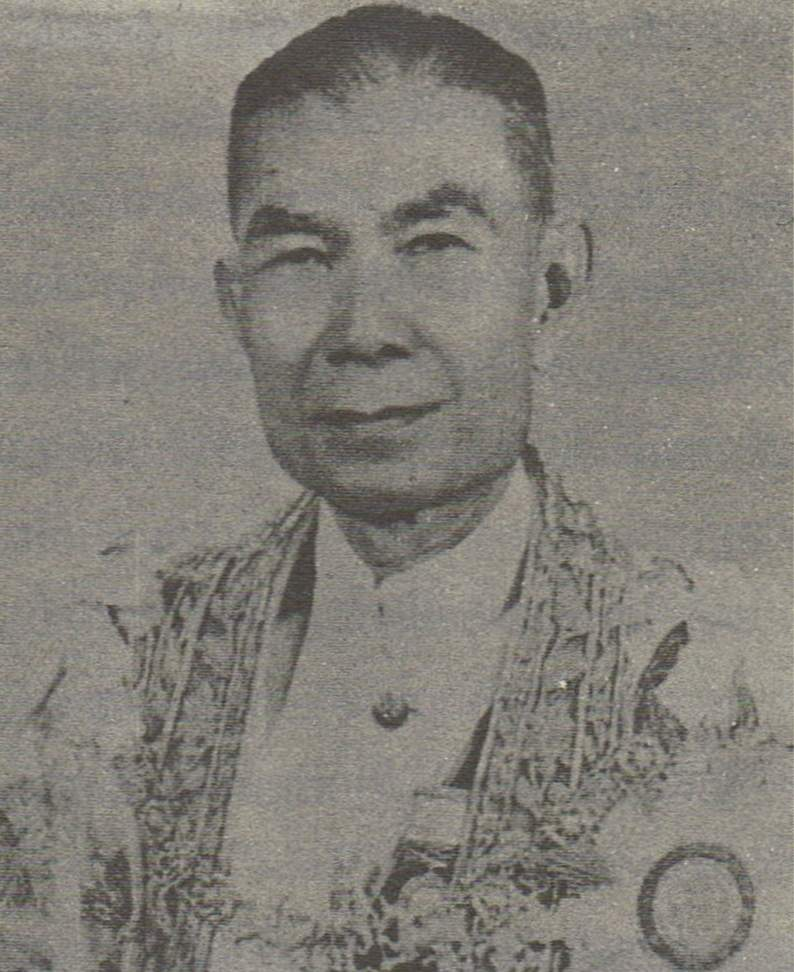
- Plot Wichian Na Songkhla before 1950

Regent of Thailand
- In office 16 June 1946 – 7 November 1947 Serving with Rangsit Prayurasakdi
- Monarch: Bhumibol Adulyadej
- Prime Minister: Pridi Banomyong; Thawan Thamrongnawasawat
- Preceded by: Phra Suthammavinijchai; Praya Nonrajasuvaj; Sanguan Juthathemi
- Succeeded by: Regency under the Privy Council

The President of the Privy Council in charge of the Regent
- In office 9 November 1947 – 23 March 1949
- Monarch: Bhumibol Adulyadej
- Prime Minister: Khuang Aphaiwong; Plaek Phibunsongkhram
- Preceded by: Rangsit Prayurasakdi; Himself
- Succeeded by: Rangsit Prayurasakdi

President of the National Assembly of Thailand
- In office 3 August 1936 – 24 June 1943
- Monarch: Ananda Mahidol
- Preceded by: Chaophraya Sri Thammathibet
- Succeeded by: Phraya Sorayuthaseni
- In office 2 July 1944 – 15 October 1945
- Monarch: Ananda Mahidol
- Preceded by: Phraya Sorayuthaseni
- Succeeded by: Vilas Osathanon

Speaker of the House of Representatives
- In office 3 August 1936 – 24 June 1943
- Preceded by: Chaophraya Sri Thammathibet
- Succeeded by: Phraya Sorayuthaseni
- In office 2 July 1944 – 3 June 1946
- Preceded by: Phraya Sorayuthaseni
- Succeeded by: Kasem Boonsri

The Secretary-General of the Council of State
- In office 27 October 1923 – 6 September 1925
- Preceded by: Established
- Succeeded by: Phraya Ladplithamprakal

Personal details
- Born: September 18, 1890 Songkhla province Siam
- Died: February 17, 1984 (aged 93) Bangkok Thailand
- Spouse: Thanphuying Sri Manawaratchasewi

Phraya Manavaratsevi, also spelt as Manawaratchasewi (Thai: พระยามานวราชเสวี), born as Plot Wichian Na Songkhla (Thai: ปลอด วิเชียร ณ สงขลา), was regent to Rama IX of Thailand for 15 years and was a secretary-general of the Office of the Council of State, a director-general of the Attorney General, a secretary of the Thai Bar, a Speaker of the House of Representatives, a President of the National Assembly of Thailand, a member and president of the Privy Council, and an Extraordinary Professor of the University of Moral and Political Sciences.

== Biography ==
Phraya Manavaratsevi was a son of Phra Anantasombat (Aim Na Songkhla), a deputy governor of Songkhla. He was born on 18 September 1890, at Phraya Suntharanurak (Net Na Songkhla)'s house in Boyang subdistrict, Mueang Songkhla district, Songkhla province. He was the brother of Chaophraya Sri Thammathibet (Jit Na Songkhla).

He studied at Assumption College, Debsirin School, and King's College (Thailand). After he graduated from King's College, he came under the patronage of Prince Raphi Phatthanasak. In 1913, he got King's Scholarship from the Ministry of Justice to study law at Inner Temple, United Kingdom.

He died on 17 February 1984 at King Chulalongkorn Memorial Hospital, Bangkok.

== Honours ==
Thai Honours

- 1950 - Knight Grand Cross (First Class) of The Most Illustrious Order of Chula Chom Klao
- 1950 - Knight Grand Cordon of the Most Exalted Order of the White Elephant
- 1941 - Knight Grand Cordon of the Most Noble Order of the Crown of Thailand
- 1926 - King Prajadhipok's Royal Cypher Medal, 4th Class
- 1938 - King Ananda Mahidol's Royal Cypher Medal, 2nd Class
- 1953 - King Bhumibol Adulyadej's Royal Cypher Medal, 1st Class
- 1935 - Safeguarding the Constitution Medal
- 1918 - Dushdi Mala Medal, Sinlapa Witthaya
- 1934 - Chakrabarti Mala Medal
- 1925 - King Rama VII Coronation Medal
- 1950 - King Rama IX Coronation Medal
- 1932 - Commemorative Medal on the Occasion of the 150th Years of Rattanakosin Celebration
- 1933 - First Class (Gold Medal) of Red Cross Medal of Appreciation

Foreign Honours

Denmark:

- 1958 - Grand Cross of the Order of the Dannebrog
