= 1955 in Thailand =

- Decades: 1930s; 1940s; 1950s; 1960s; 1970s
- See also: Other events of 1955; Timeline of Thai history

The year 1955 was the 174th year of the Rattanakosin Kingdom of Thailand. It was the 10th year in the reign of King Bhumibol Adulyadej (Rama IX), and is reckoned as year 2498 in the Buddhist Era.

== Incumbents ==
- King: Bhumibol Adulyadej
- Crown Prince: (vacant)
- Prime Minister: Plaek Phibunsongkhram
- Supreme Patriarch: Vajirananavongs

== Events ==
=== April ===
- 2 April - Queen Sirikit gives birth to a third child and second daughter Sirindhorn.

== Births ==
- 2 April - Sirindhorn Thai Princess

== See also ==
- List of Thai films of 1955
- 1955 in Thai television
