= 1956 in Thailand =

- Decades: 1930s; 1940s; 1950s; 1960s; 1970s
- See also: Other events of 1956; Timeline of Thai history

The year 1956 was the 175th year of the Rattanakosin Kingdom of Thailand. It was the 11th year in the reign of King Bhumibol Adulyadej (Rama IX), and is reckoned as year 2499 in the Buddhist Era.

== Incumbents ==
- King: Bhumibol Adulyadej
- Crown Prince: (vacant)
- Prime Minister: Plaek Phibunsongkhram
- Supreme Patriarch: Vajirananavongs

== Events ==
=== October ===
- 22 October - His Majesty King Bhumibol Adulyadej enter monkhood for 15 days.

=== November ===
- 5 November - His Majesty King Bhumibol Adulyadej left the monkhood.

== Births ==
- Win Lyovarin, Thai author

== See also ==
- List of Thai films of 1956
- 1956 in Thai television
