= 1949 in Thailand =

- Decades: 1920s; 1930s; 1940s; 1950s; 1960s
- See also: Other events of 1949; Timeline of Thai history

The year 1949 was the 168th year of the Rattanakosin Kingdom of Thailand. It was the fourth year in the reign of King Bhumibol Adulyadej (Rama IX), and is reckoned as year 2492 in the Buddhist Era.

== Incumbents ==
- King: Bhumibol Adulyadej
- Crown Prince: (vacant)
- Prime Minister: Plaek Phibunsongkhram
- Supreme Patriarch: Vajirananavongs

== Births ==
- 26 July- Thaksin Shinawatra, Former Thai Prime Minister

== See also ==
- List of Thai films of 1949
