= Chaophraya Phrasadet Surentharathibodi =

Siamese education minister and diplomat

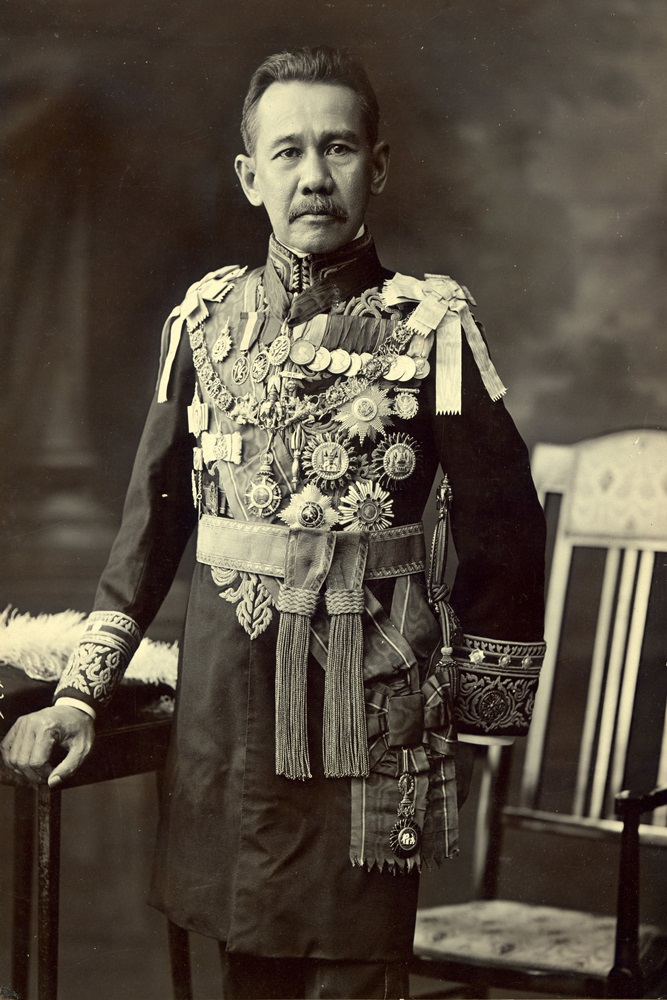

Minister of Public Instruction
- In office 6 April 1912 – 28 March 1916
- Monarch: Vajiravudh
- Preceded by: Chaophraya Wichitwongwutthikrai
- Succeeded by: Chaophraya Thammasakmontri

Permanent Under-secretary for Public Instruction
- In office 1902–1911
- Monarchs: Chulalongkorn, Vajiravudh
- Minister: Chaophraya Wichitwongwutthikrai
- Preceded by: Phraya Wichitwongwutthikrai
- Succeeded by: Phraya Thammasakmontri

Personal details
- Born: Pia (Malakul); 16 April 1867 Bangkok, Siam
- Died: 14 February 1917 (aged 49) Bangkok, Siam
- Spouse: Thanphuying Sa-ngiam Malakul
- Children: 10 children, incl. Pin Malakul
- Known for: Developing modern education in Siam

Mom Rajawongse Pia Malakul (Note: Mom rajawongse is a Thai honorific hereditary title denoting a royal bloodline; the subject's personal name was Pia Malakul.) (Thai: หม่อมราชวงศ์เปีย มาลากุล, 16 April 1867 – 14 February 1917), better known by his noble title Chaophraya Phrasadet Surentharathibodi (เจ้าพระยาพระเสด็จสุเรนทราธิบดี), was a Thai educationalist who was influential in the development of Siam's modern education system during the early twentieth century. He served as Minister of Public Instruction under King Vajiravudh from 1912 to 1916, and laid out the country's first formal education plan. He was also a writer; his manual on modern etiquette, Sombat Khong Phudi (Qualities of a Gentleman), is one of his most influential works. In recognition of his contributions to education, the 150th anniversary of his birth was celebrated in association with the UNESCO in 2017.

== Early life ==
Mom Rajawongse Pia was born on Tuesday 12th, waxing moon, 5th month, year of the rabbit, which corresponds to 16 April 1867. His father was the Prince Krommamuen Prapporapak, a grandson of King Rama II; his mother's name was Piam. As a boy, he was presented to Prince Damrong Rajanubhab, and enrolled at Suankularb Palace School (now Suankularb Wittayalai School). Pia completed both stages of education, which usually took four years, in a single year. He then underwent customary temporary ordination as a Buddhist monk at Wat Bowonniwet.

== Career ==
Pia began his career in the Department of Education, serving as personal secretary to Prince Damrong and receiving the noble title Luang Phaisansinlapasat (หลวงไพศาลศิลปศาสตร์). Pia followed Prince Damrong to the Ministry of Interior in 1892 when the Prince became minister, and was promoted to the title Phra Montriphotchanakit (พระมนตรีพจนกิจ).

In 1893, King Chulalongkorn assigned Pia to be Prince Vajiravudh's guardian during the Prince's studies in England. Pia also acted as guardian to many of the King's sons in England, and received the title Phraya Wisutsuriyasak (พระยาวิสุทธสุริยศักดิ์). He also came to serve as Minister to the United Kingdom, the Netherlands, Belgium and the United States, from 1897 to 1899.

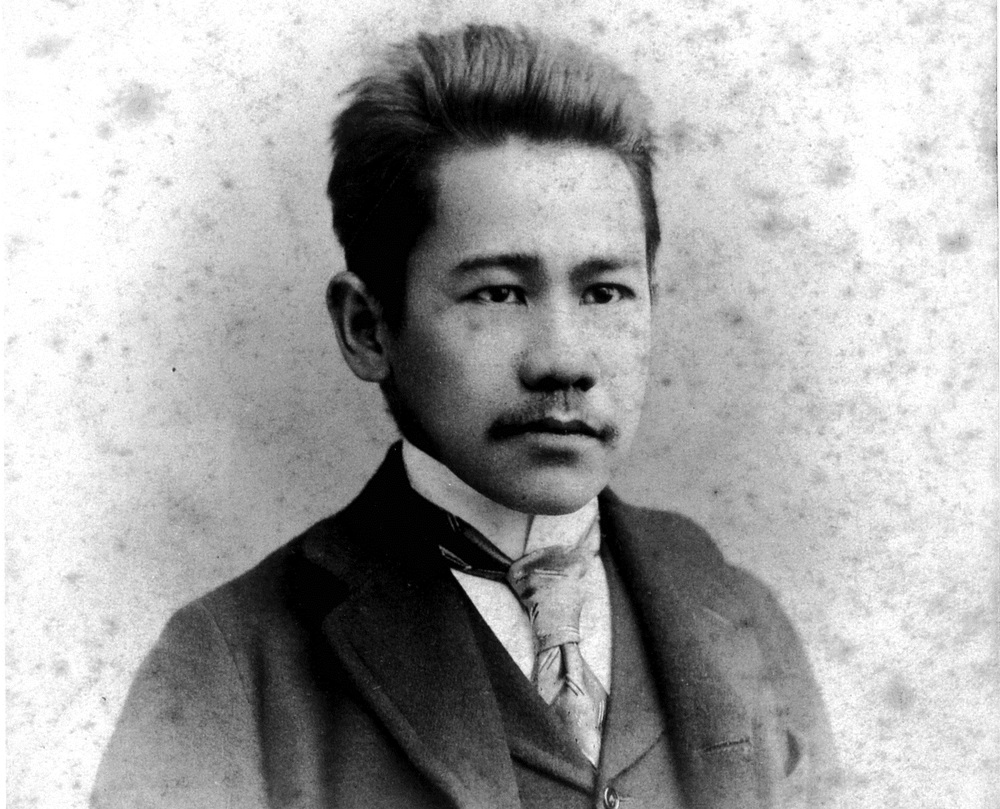
Pia in Western suit and tie, probably during his time in England

As custodian to the royal students, Pia made observations of the modern Western education system. In a letter replying to the King's inquiries on why many of the students were failing in their education, Pia, a strong advocate of meritocracy, wrote that students were being sent regardless of their academic abilities, like sending whole logs to the sawmill; beginning work, only to find a hollow, unusable log, resulted in a waste of time and money. The King then commissioned a report, which Pia completed in 1898, suggesting improvements to Siam's developing education system; it was developed into the country's first education plan.

Pia returned to Bangkok in 1899. One of the government's priorities in education at the time was expanding professional education in order to staff the rapidly growing bureaucracy. Pia became the head of the newly established Training School of the Civil Service, which later became the Royal Pages School and then Chulalongkorn University. To train the newly educated in proper manners, Pia authored Sombat Khong Phudi (สมบัติของผู้ดี, Qualities of a Gentleman) a manual prescribing proper etiquette which was highly influential and had over a million copies printed throughout the century.

Pia became Minister of Public Instruction in 1912, during the reign of King Vajiravudh, and received the title Chaophraya Phrasadet Surentharathibodi (chaophraya being the highest rank in the nobility still in use at the time). He pushed for the adoption of compulsory education, but due to constraints in the development of mass education, the policy was not successful. It was later passed in 1921, under his successor Chaophraya Thammasakmontri.

Pia resigned from public office in 1916, due to ill health.

== Personal life ==
Pia married Miss Sa-ngiam (later Thanphuying Sa-ngiam), daughter of Luang Anurakphubet (Singto), in 1888. They lived at Luang Anurakphubet's family home on Atsadang Road before moving into a new property on Lan Luang Road, where Pia lived until his death. They had ten children, including a son, Mom Luang Pin Malakul, who would also become one of Thailand's most influential educators.

The family name Malakul was bestowed by King Vajiravudh on 30 May 1913, following the royal act which prescribed the use of surnames.

Toward the end of his career, Pia suffered from neurasthenia and also fell ill to malaria. Chaophraya Thammasakmontri, who was a close aide of his, would later note that "working with a fever in the office was one of his well-known habits". He died less than a year after retiring, on 14 February 1917.

== Works and recognition ==
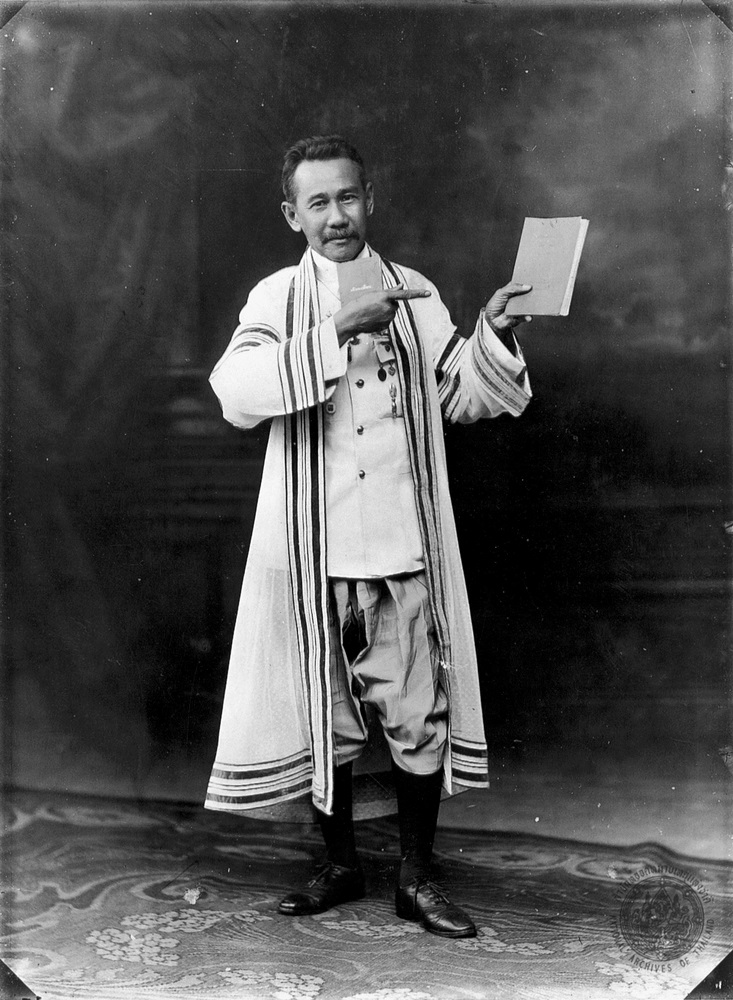
Pia, wearing the khrui of a high-ranking official, posing with books in hand

Pia produced numerous works, most of them textbooks written during his career in the Ministry of Public Instruction, focusing on the subjects of ethics and the Thai language. These include—in addition to Sombat Khong Phudi—Phonlamueang Di (พลเมืองดี, "The Good Citizen"), Chanya Phaet (จรรยาแพทย์, "Medical Ethics"), Akkharawithi (อักขระวิธี, "Orthography"), Phongsawadan Yo (พงศาวดารย่อ "Abridged Chronicles"), Kham Thiap Ro Lo (คำเทียบ ร.ล., "Comparison of Ro and Lo Words"), Chuai Phuean (ช่วยเพื่อน, "Helping Friends") and Tuean Phuean (เตือนเพื่อน, "Warning Friends"). To the modern Thai public, however, his most familiar work is probably the patriotic song "Samakkhi Chumnum" ("United Gathering"), for which Pia wrote the lyrics, and which and is set to the tune of "Auld Lang Syne".

As part of its anniversaries programme, the UNESCO, recognizing his contributions to education, was associated with the celebration of the 150th anniversary of Pia's birth in 2017. A building in Suankularb Wittayalai School is named Sala Phrasadet in his honour.

== Honours ==
=== Thai honours ===
- Knight Grand Cross (First Class) of the Most Illustrious Order of Chula Chom Klao (1913)
- Knight Grand Cross (First Class) of the Most Exalted Order of the White Elephant (1912)
- Knight Grand Cross (First Class) of the Most Noble Order of the Crown of Thailand (1910)
- Knight of the Ratana Varabhorn Order of Merit (1912)
- Dushdi Mala Medal for Arts (1894)
- Chakrabarti Mala Medal (1914)
- King Rama V Royal Cypher Medal, 3rd Class (1908)
- King Rama VI Royal Cypher Medal, 2nd Class (1914)
- King Rama V Royal Court Medal (1906)
- King Rama VI Royal Court Medal (1911)

=== Foreign honours ===
- Austria-Hungary: Knight of the Order of Franz Joseph (1889)
- Belgium: Grand Cordon of the Order of Leopold (1899)
- Brunswick: Grand Cross of the Order of Henry the Lion (1910)
- Denmark: Commander 1st Class of the Order of the Dannebrog (1890)
- France: Officer of the Order of Academic Palms (1892)
- Japan:
  - Grand Cordon of the Order of the Sacred Treasure (1902)
  - Gold and Silver Rays of the Order of the Rising Sun (1890)
- Prussia: Third Class of the Order of the Crown (1889)
- Sweden–Norway: Commander of the Order of St. Olav (1889)
