= Dhani Nivat =

Thai regent and minister

Dhani Nivat ธานีนิวัต
- Prince Bidyalabh Bridhyakon
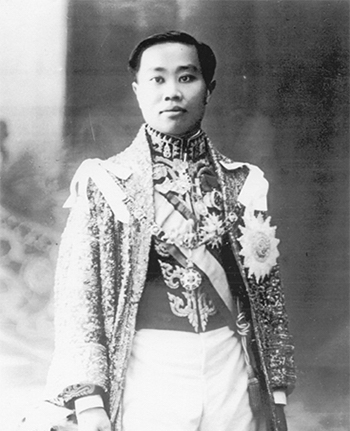

Regent of Thailand
- In office: 12 March 1951 – 19 December 1952; 27 May – 6 June 1963; 9 – 14 July 1963

President of the Privy Council
- In office: 18 June 1949 – 25 March 1950
- Predecessor: Position established
- Successor: Prince Rangsit Prayurasakdi

Minister of Public Instruction
- In office: 3 August 1926 – 10 December 1932
- Prime Minister: Phraya Manopakorn Nititada
- Predecessor: Thammasakmontri
- Successor: Thammasakmontri
- Born: 7 November 1885; Bangkok, Siam
- Died: 8 September 1974 (aged 88); Bangkok, Thailand
- Spouse: Prayoon Sonakul na Ayutthaya (née Sukhum)
- Issue: 3 children: Nivatvas Na Pombejra Phanditya Sonakul Supphicha Na Pombejra
- House: Chakri dynasty
- Father: Bidyalabh Pruethidhada
- Mother: Am Sonakul Na Ayutthaya

Dhani Nivat, the Prince Bidyalabh Bridhyakon (Thai: พระวรวงศ์เธอ พระองค์เจ้าธานีนิวัต กรมหมื่นพิทยลาภพฤฒิยากร; 7 November 1885 – 8 September 1974) was a member of the Chakri dynasty and Thai courtier. Previously known as Prince Dhaninivat Sonakul (หม่อมเจ้าธานีนิวัต โสณกุล), he received princely rank in 1922. Prince Dhani served many Thai monarchs as Minister of Education and as President of the Privy Council; in the latter capacity he acted as regent for King Bhumibol Adulyadej on three separate occasions. The prince was also known for his academic writings on Thai history and culture. He served as president of the Siam Society for over 20 years.

== Biography ==
=== Early life ===
Prince Dhaninivat Sonakul was born on 7 November 1885, the eldest son of Prince Sonabandhit, the Prince Bidyalabh Pruethidhada and Am Sonakul Na Ayutthaya (née Kuntholchinda). Prince Sonabandhit was the 62nd son of King Mongkut and Consort Vad. His father was the first Siamese military attaché in London. As Prince Dhaninivat was born right after the end of his father's posting abroad his name meant "Returning to the City" (of Bangkok).

The prince was raised in the Inner Court of the Grand Palace, where his grandmother was Mistress of the Robes. In 1898 at the age of 13, Prince Dhaninivat was ordained as a Samanera or novice monk in the Buddhist Sangha, as was customary for all Thai males. However, as a royal prince his ordination service was carried out at the chapel royal (Wat Phra Kaew). In 1909 he became a full fledge Bhikkhu monk under Vajirananavarorasa and resided with him at Wat Bowonniwet.

His father insisted he continued his studies abroad. After leaving the monkhood he went to England and under King Chulalongkorn's sponsorship studied at Rugby School. He then went on to study Oriental Languages at Merton College, Oxford (namely Pali and Sanskrit) and graduated with second-class honours.

=== Government service ===
The prince returned to Siam and began working at the Ministry of the Interior under Prince Damrong Rajanubhab. He was sent up country and became chief of the administrative bureau of the Circle of Ayutthaya. During the reign of King Vajiravudh he was appointed Private Secretary to Queen Saovabha Phongsri, the mother of the king. After the queen mother's death in 1919, he became the king's secretary of foreign correspondence, as well as clerk of the Cabinet Council and Secretary of the Privy Council. In 1922 he was elevated to the higher princely rank of Phra Ong Chao; thus becoming Phra Worawongse Ther Phra Ong Chao Dhani Nivat (พระวรวงศ์เธอ พระองค์เจ้าธานีนิวัต).

In the reign of King Prajadhipok he was appointed acting-Minister of Education after the resignation of Chaophraya Thammasakmontri, afterwards he took over the ministry as its principal minister on 3 August 1926. After the Siamese revolution of 1932, the prince and all members of the extended royal family was removed from the government by the Khana Ratsadon (the People's party). Chaophraya Thammasakmontri took over the Ministry of Education once more under the constitutional government. Prince Dhani then retired from government service.

=== Courtier ===
On 25 March 1950 he became a privy councillor to King Bhumibol Adulyadej. When the king decided to return to Switzerland for further education, he appointed Prince Rangsit Prayurasakdi, the Prince of Chainat the Regent of Thailand, and asked Prince Dhani Nivat to become President of the Privy Council of Thailand in his stead, he was appointed on 4 June 1950. On 8 May 1950, the king in commemoration of his own coronation ceremony, in which Prince Dhani played a major part, granted to the prince a further honour of "Krom" rank retitling him: Phra Worawongse Ther Krom Muen Bidyalabh Bridhyakon (พระวรวงศ์เธอ กรมหมื่นพิทยลาภพฤฒิยากร). On 7 March 1951 Prince Rangsit died. The king again asked Prince Dhani Nivat to succeed him, this time as the regent. He was appointed on 12 March 1951. After the king's permanent return to Thailand in 1952, the prince continued to serve as president of the Privy Council.

The prince served as regent twice more, both in 1963. Firstly from 27 May to 6 June, when the king made a state visit to Japan and the Republic of China. And from 9 to 14 July during his visit to the Philippines.

Prince Dhani Nivat died on 8 September 1974 at the age of 88. He was married to Prayoon Sonakul na Ayutthaya (née Sukhum), daughter of Phraya Yommarat (Pun Sukhum). They have three children.

== Selected works ==
- "The Old Siamese Conception of the Monarchy" (PDF). Journal of the Siam Society. 36 (2): 91–106. December 1947. ISSN 0304-226X.
- "The Shadow-Play as a Possible Origin of the Masked-Play" (PDF). Journal of the Siam Society. 37 (1): 26–32. October 1948. ISSN 0304-226X.
- "King Mongkut's Autograph Letter To Pius IX" (PDF). Journal of the Siam Society. 37 (2): 111–123. June 1949. ISSN 0304-226X.
- "Traditional Dresses in the Classic Dance of Siam" (PDF). Journal of the Siam Society. 40 (2): 133–145. December 1952. ISSN 0304-226X.
- "The Date and Authorship of the Romance of Phra Lô" (PDF). Journal of the Siam Society. 41 (2): 179–182. January 1954. ISSN 0304-226X.
- "The Reconstruction of Rāma I of the Chakri Dynasty" (PDF). Journal of the Siam Society. 43 (1): 21–47. August 1955. ISSN 0304-226X.
  - "The Age of King Rama I of the Chakri Dynasty" (PDF). Journal of the Siam Society. 46 (1): 51. June 1958. ISSN 0304-226X. (a note to the above)

=== Co-author ===
- Dhani Nivat; Seidenfaden, Erik (March 1939). "Early Trade Relations Between Denmark and Siam" (PDF). Journal of the Siam Society. 31 (1): 1–15. ISSN 0304-226X.
- Dhaninivat Kromamiin Bidyalabh Bridhyakorn; Dhanit Yupho (1954). The Khon. Bangkok: Fine Arts Department.

== Honours ==
Standard of the Regent of Thailand.

- Knight of the Order of the Royal House of Chakri
- Knight of the Ratana Varabhorn Order of Merit
- Knight Grand Cross (First Class) of the Order of Chula Chom Klao
- Knight Grand Cordon (Special Class) of the Order of the White Elephant
- Knight Grand Cordon (Special Class) of the Order of the Crown of Thailand
- Member of the Vallabhabhorn Order
- Dushdi Mala Medal for Distinguished Services in Arts and Sciences
- King Rama VI Royal Cypher Medal, 2nd Class
- King Rama VII Royal Cypher Medal, 2nd Class
- King Rama IX Royal Cypher Medal, 1st Class
- King Rama VI Court Medal

=== Foreign ===
- Grand Officer fo the Order of Sikatuna
- Knight Grand Cross of the Royal Order of Cambodia
- Grand Cross of the Order of the Million Elephants and the White Parasol
- Special Grand Cordon of the Order of Brilliant Star
- Grand Cordon of the Order of the Dannebrog
- Grand Cross 1st Class of the Order of Merit of the Federal Republic of Germany
- Grand Commander (Honorary) Order of the Defender of the Realm (Malaysia) (1964)

== See also ==
- Siam Society
- Monarchy of Thailand
