= 1953 in Thailand =

- Decades: 1930s; 1940s; 1950s; 1960s; 1970s
- See also: Other events of 1953; Timeline of Thai history

The year 1953 was the 172nd year of the Rattanakosin Kingdom of Thailand. It was the 8th year in the reign of King Bhumibol Adulyadej (Rama IX), and is reckoned as year 2496 in the Buddhist Era.

== Incumbents ==
- King: Bhumibol Adulyadej
- Crown Prince: (vacant)
- Prime Minister: Plaek Phibunsongkhram
- Supreme Patriarch: Vajirananavongs

== See also ==
- List of Thai films of 1953
