= 1954 in Thailand =

- Decades: 1930s; 1940s; 1950s; 1960s; 1970s
- See also: Other events of 1954; Timeline of Thai history

The year 1954 was the 173rd year of the Rattanakosin Kingdom of Thailand. It was the 9th year in the reign of King Bhumibol Adulyadej (Rama IX), and is reckoned as year 2497 in the Buddhist Era.

== Incumbents ==
- King: Bhumibol Adulyadej
- Crown Prince: (vacant)
- Prime Minister: Plaek Phibunsongkhram
- Supreme Patriarch: Vajirananavongs

== See also ==
- List of Thai films of 1954
