= Krom Luang Thepharirak =

Prince of Siam, nephew of Rama I

Krommaluang Thep-harirak กรมหลวงเทพหริรักษ์
- Born: 1759; Samut Songkhram, Siam
- Died: 1805 (aged 45–46); Bangkok, Siam
- House: Devahastin
- Dynasty: Chakri
- Father: Ngoen Saetan
- Mother: Kaeo, Princess Sri Sudarak

Somdet Phra Samphanthawong Thoe Chaofa Krommaluang Thep-harirak (Thai: สมเด็จพระสัมพันธวงศ์เธอ เจ้าฟ้ากรมหลวงเทพหริรักษ์, 1759–1805), birth name Tan (ตัน), was a prince of Siam. He was a nephew of King Rama I. He was known in Vietnamese contexts as Chiêu Tăng (昭曾).

Prince Thepharirak was the eldest son of Princess Sri Sudarak (เจ้าฟ้ากรมพระศรีสุดารักษ์) (sister of Phutthayotfa Chulalok) and her Chinese husband Ngoen Saetan (เงิน แซ่ตัน). One of his sisters was Sri Suriyendra.

In 1783, Nguyễn Ánh, who was the Nguyễn lord ruled over southern Vietnam, sought aid for Siamese to retake Gia Định (Saigon) from Tây-Sơn rebel forces. In 1785, Prince Thepharirak was ordered to attack Saigon with 50,000 soldiers together with Ánh, while Phraya Wichitnarong led an army through Cambodia in order to gather khmer soldiers to join the battalion. Chaophraya Aphaiphubet (Vietnamese: Chiêu Thùy Biện 昭錘卞), the governor of Cambodia, also sent 5000 Cambodian soldiers to support them. They were utterly beaten by Nguyễn Huệ in Rạch Gầm-Xoài Mút, and fled to Cambodia. King Rama I was furious. The King was about to punish him, but then the two elder sisters of the King gave a royal pardon.

Krommaluang Thepharirak was authorized to attack Chiang Saen together with Phraya Yommarat in 1804.

He is the progenitor of the Devahastin family, a cadet branch of Chakri Dynasty that descended directly from the siblings of King Rama I.
