= 1946 in Thailand =

- Decades: 1920s; 1930s; 1940s; 1950s; 1960s
- See also: Other events of 1946; Timeline of Thai history

The year 1946 was the 165th year of the Rattanakosin Kingdom of Thailand. It was the twelfth and last year in the reign of King Ananda Mahidol (Rama VIII), the first year in the reign of Bhumibol Adulyadej (Rama IX), and is reckoned as year 2489 in the Buddhist Era.

== Incumbents ==
- King:
  - until 9 June: Ananda Mahidol
  - starting 9 June: Bhumibol Adulyadej
- Crown Prince: (vacant)
- Prime Minister:
  - until 31 January: Seni Pramoj
  - 31 January-24 March: Khuang Aphaiwong
  - 24 March-23 August: Pridi Banomyong
  - starting 23 August: Thawan Thamrongnawasawat
- Supreme Patriarch: Vajirananavongs

== Events ==
=== January ===
- 1946 Siamese general election

=== June ===
- Murder of Ananda Mahidol
