= Phraya Thephatsadin =

Siamese military commander

Phraya Phat Thephatsadin
- พระยาเทพหัสดิน
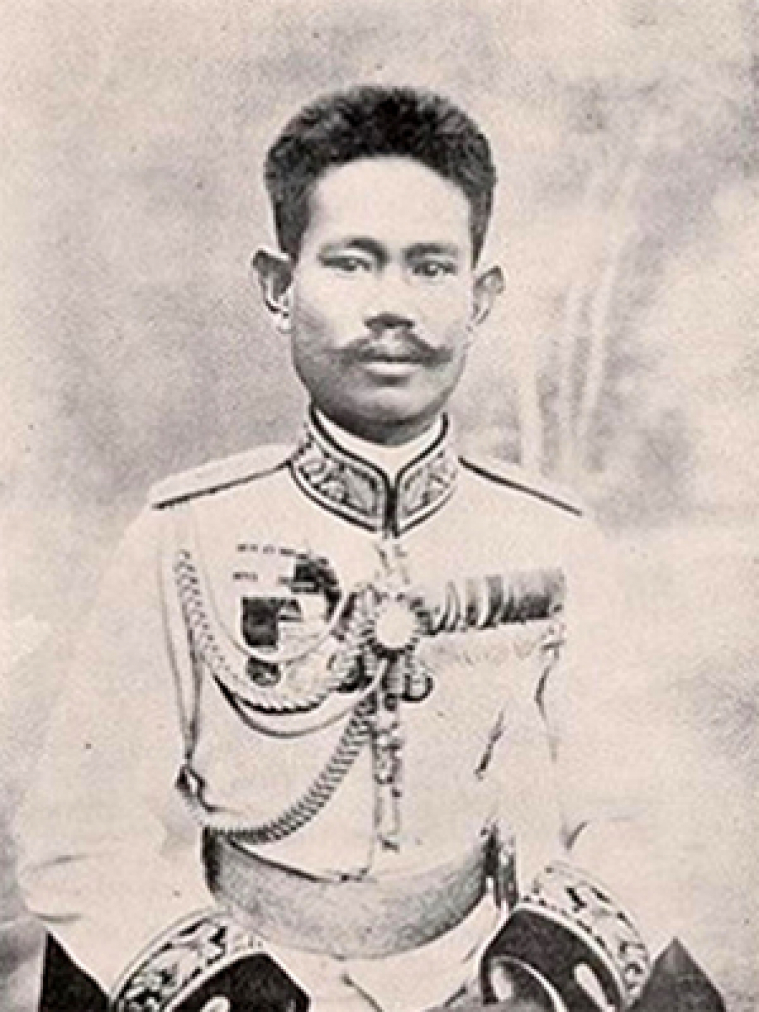

Minister of Transport
- In office 30 November 1948 – 11 January 1951
- Monarch: Bhumibol Adulyadej
- Prime Minister: Plaek Phibunsongkhram
- Preceded by: Phraya Sriphichaisongkhram (Charoen Chanchai)
- Succeeded by: Pathom Phokaew

Commander of the Siamese Expeditionary Forces
- In office September 1917 – July 1919
- Preceded by: Office established
- Succeeded by: Office abolished

Personal details
- Born: Phat Thephatsadin Na Ayutthaya; 6 February 1878 Wat Chakkrawat, Phra Nakhon, Siam
- Died: 7 July 1951 (aged 73)
- Children: 11

Military service
- Allegiance: Siam
- Branch: Royal Thai Army
- Rank: General
- Commands: Siamese Expeditionary Forces
- Battles/wars: World War I: Western Front

Phraya Thephatsadin (Thai: พระยาเทพหัสดิน), personal name Phat Thephatsadin na Ayutthaya (Thai: ผาด เทพหัสดิน ณ อยุธยา; the surname is also spelled as Devahastin na Ayudhya) was a Thai military ambassador that participated in World War I and served as the Minister of Transport of Thailand of the government of Plaek Phibunsongkhram.

== Early life ==
Phat was born on 6 February 1878, near Wat Chakkrawat in what was then Phra Nakhon province (now Bangkok) as the eldest son of a total of 8 siblings, his father being Colonel Luang Rit Naiwen (Phut Thephatsadin na Ayutthaya), who was a half-brother of Chaophraya Thammasakmontri.

When Phat was 5 years old, he was brought to King Chulalongkorn to offer flowers, incense sticks and candles as royal gifts, as was traditional for noble families to place their sons in the service of the royal court. The King stated the following about him:

This child is good-looking and active. His age is similar to that of the great prince. Please take these flowers, incense sticks and candles to offer his services to the great prince, so they can be friends.

When Phat was 7, his father sent him to study at the Wat Bophitphimuk School, later transferring to the Suankularb Palace School (now Suankularb Wittayalai School) until he reached the age of 13. After the death of his father, who was then deputy commander of the Army War Department, Chulalongkorn sent Phat to for studies in France and he later transferred to a Royal Military Academy in Brussels, Belgium, returning in 1902.

=== World War I ===
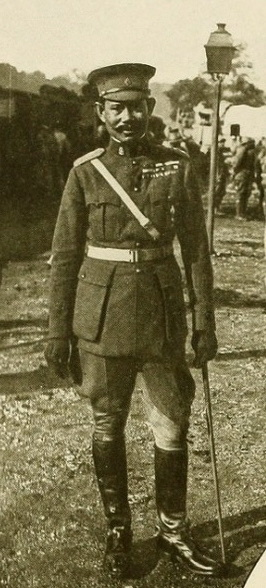
Thephatsadin during World War I in France.

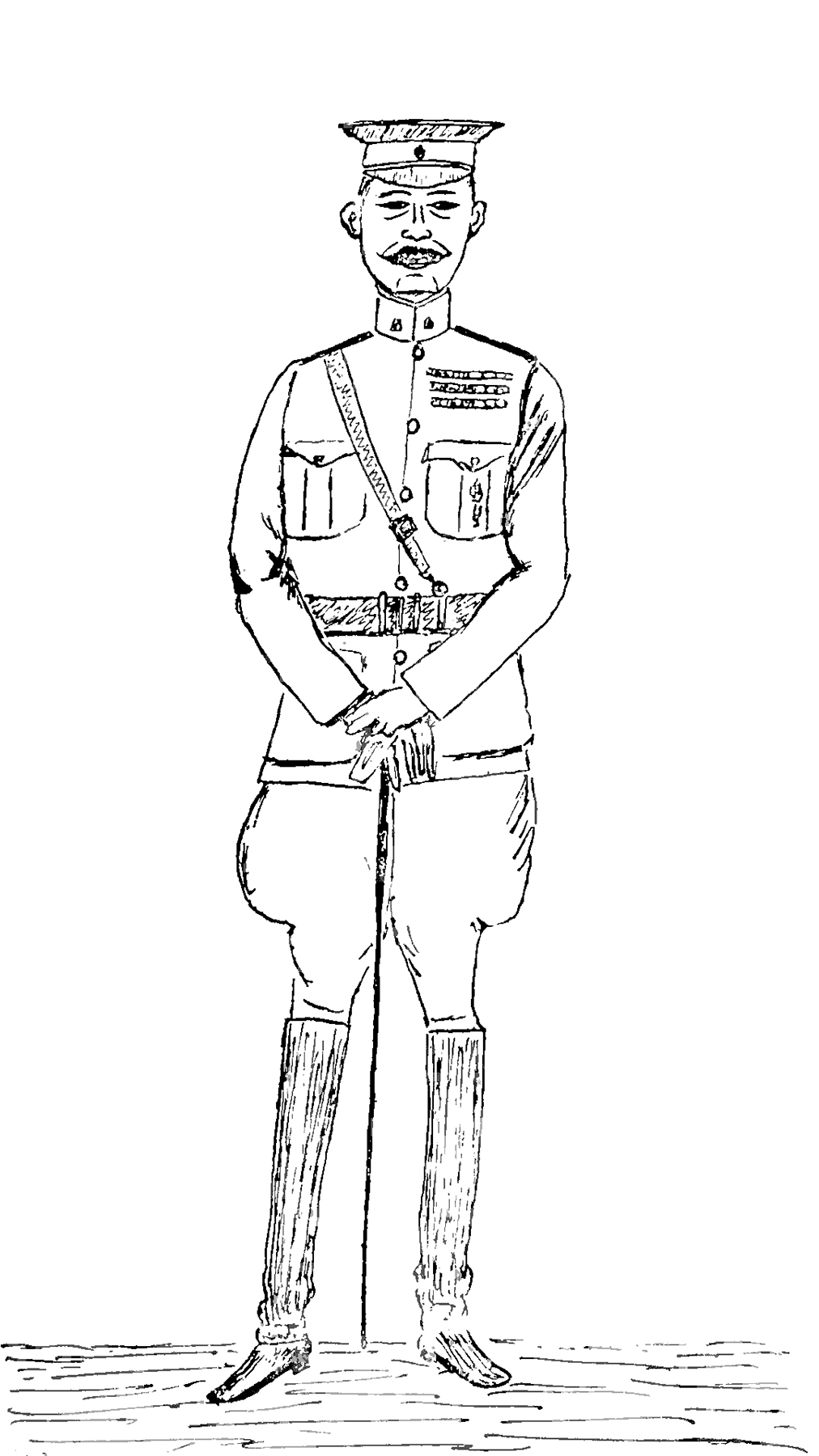
A caricature of Thephatsadin, drawn by King Vajiravudh, circa 1921

On 22 July 1917, Thailand declared war on Germany and Austria-Hungary in World War I with a royal decree calling for volunteers to enlist in the Siamese Expeditionary Forces; many volunteers applied. During this time, Phat, who at this time had the title of Major General Phraya Phichaichanrit, was promoted by King Vajiravudh to be the head of a special diplomatic mission in the position of commander-in-chief of the Expeditionary Forces, leading the forces that would participate in the Western Front.

After returning from the war, he resigned from his military position and was transferred to the civil service, with the noble title Phraya Thephatsadin, serving as the samuhathesaphiban or royal commissioner in the monthon of Nakhon Sawan and Ratchaburi. He also founded the Siam Taxi Company in Thailand in 1923.

Throughout his government service, Thephatsadin was reputed to be very loyal to the monarchy and even had a personal friendship with the King, with a tale recounting that Vajiravudh once shared a coconut he was drinking from with him.

== Songsuradet rebellion ==
When Plaek Phibunsongkhram (Phibun) became prime minister of Thailand, in December 1938 there was a political purge of those accused of conspiring to seize power from the government and attempt to assassinate Phibun. Over 51 suspects were arrested in the early morning of 29 January 1939, and a special court was established to try them, which sentenced 21 prisoners to death, including Thephatsadin and two of his sons. His sentence was reduced to life imprisonment due to his past contribution, but his sons were executed.

When the Phibun government was ousted, Khuang Aphaiwong succeeded as Prime Minister on 1 August 1944. The first thing the new government did was ask for royal pardons for all political prisoners, and Thephatsdin was set free on 20 September 1944 and amnesty was granted three years later in September 1947.

Many years later, Thephatsdin received an apology letter from Phibun for having misunderstood the whole matter and asked for forgiveness.

== Political career ==
Phraya Thephatsadin was a Member of the House of Representatives, representing the Phra Nakhon Province from the 1933 Siamese general election, which was considered the first election of Thailand and held the position of Deputy Speaker of the House of Representatives.

In his later years, he had received the highest rank of General and became the Minister of Transport in the government of Plaek Phibunsongkhram on November 30, 1948, who returned to receive the position of Prime Minister again after the 1947 Thai coup d'état and the 1948 Thai coup d'état, with Thephatsadin's own personal involvement to support Phibun's position as prime minister.

== Awards ==
Royal Decorations

- Knight of the Ratana Varabhorn Order of Merit
- Knight Grand Cordon of the Most Noble Order of the Crown of Thailand
- Knight Grand Cross of the Most Exalted Order of the White Elephant
- Knight Grand Commander of the Most Illustrious Order of Chula Chom Klao
- War Medal of B.E. 2461
- Dushdi Mala Medal Pin of Arts and Science (Military Members)
- Chakra Mala Medal
- Saradul Mala Medal
- King Rama VI Royal Cypher Medal, 3rd Class
- Prabas Mala Medal
- Dvidha Bhisek Medal
- Rajamangala Medal
- Rajamangala Bhisek Medal
- King Rama VI Coronation Medal
- Chai Medal
- King Vajiravudh's old courtiers' pin

=== Foreign Honours ===
- France :
  - Knight of the Legion of Honour
  - Croix de Guerre
- UK :
  - Knight Commander of the Order of St Michael and St George
- Belgium :
  - Grand Officer of the Order of the Crown

== See also ==
- Devahastin family
