= 1952 in Thailand =

- Decades: 1930s; 1940s; 1950s; 1960s; 1970s
- See also: Other events of 1952; Timeline of Thai history

The year 1952 was the 171st year of the Rattanakosin Kingdom of Thailand. It was the 7th year in the reign of King Bhumibol Adulyadej (Rama IX), and is reckoned as year 2495 in the Buddhist Era.

== Incumbents ==
- King: Bhumibol Adulyadej
- Crown Prince: (vacant)
- Prime Minister: Plaek Phibunsongkhram
- Supreme Patriarch: Vajirananavongs

== Events ==
=== July ===
- 28 July - Queen Sirikit gives birth to a second child and only son Vajiralongkorn.

== Births ==
- 28 July - Vajiralongkorn, Thai King

== See also ==
- List of Thai films of 1952
