= 1947 in Thailand =

- Decades: 1920s; 1930s; 1940s; 1950s; 1960s
- See also: Other events of 1947; Timeline of Thai history

The year 1947 was the 166th year of the Rattanakosin Kingdom of Thailand. It was the second year in the reign of King Bhumibol Adulyadej (Rama IX), and is reckoned as year 2490 in the Buddhist Era.

== Incumbents ==
- King: Bhumibol Adulyadej
- Crown Prince: (vacant)
- Prime Minister:
  - until 8 November: Thawan Thamrongnawasawat
  - starting 10 November: Khuang Aphaiwong
- Supreme Patriarch: Vajirananavongs

== Births ==
- 31 August- Somchai Wongsawat, Former Thai Prime Minister

== See also ==
- List of Thai films of 1947
