= 1951 in Thailand =

- Decades: 1930s; 1940s; 1950s; 1960s; 1970s
- See also: Other events of 1951; Timeline of Thai history

The year 1951 was the 170th year of the Rattanakosin Kingdom of Thailand. It was the 6th year in the reign of King Bhumibol Adulyadej (Rama IX), and is reckoned as year 2494 in the Buddhist Era.

== Incumbents ==
- King: Bhumibol Adulyadej
- Crown Prince: (vacant)
- Prime Minister: Plaek Phibunsongkhram
- Supreme Patriarch: Vajirananavongs

== Events ==
=== April ===
- 5 April - Queen Sirikit gives birth to a daughter Ubol Ratana.

== Births ==
- 5 Apr - Ubol Ratana, Thai Princess

== See also ==
- List of Thai films of 1951
