= 1948 in Thailand =

- Decades: 1920s; 1930s; 1940s; 1950s; 1960s
- See also: Other events of 1948; Timeline of Thai history

The year 1948 was the 167th year of the Rattanakosin Kingdom of Thailand. It was the third year in the reign of King Bhumibol Adulyadej (Rama IX), and is reckoned as year 2491 in the Buddhist Era.

== Incumbents ==
- King: Bhumibol Adulyadej
- Crown Prince: (vacant)
- Prime Minister:
  - until 8 April: Khuang Aphaiwong
  - starting 8 April: Plaek Phibunsongkhram
- Supreme Patriarch: Vajirananavongs
