= 1945 in Thailand =

- Decades: 1920s; 1930s; 1940s; 1950s; 1960s
- See also: Other events of 1945; Timeline of Thai history

The year 1945 was the 164th year of the Rattanakosin Kingdom of Thailand. It was the eleventh and penultimate year in the reign of King Ananda Mahidol (Rama VIII), and is reckoned as year 2488 in the Buddhist Era.

== Incumbents ==
- King: Ananda Mahidol
- Crown Prince: (vacant)
- Prime Minister:
  - until 31 August: Khuang Aphaiwong
  - 31 August–17 September: Thawi Bunyaket
  - starting 17 September: Seni Pramoj
- Supreme Patriarch: Vajirananavongs

== Events ==
=== March ===
- 22 March – Kasikornbank was established.

=== June ===
- 8 June – The Progressive Party was established.
