= King's Scholarship (Thailand) =

The King's Scholarship is a merit-based scholarship for overseas undergraduate studies awarded to upper-secondary school graduates in Thailand. The qualifying examinations are organized by the Thai Office of the Civil Service Commission (OCSC), and are extremely competitive; a total of nine scholarships are awarded annually. The scholarship is widely considered to be the greatest academic achievement possible for Thai school students.

Unlike other Thai Government scholarships, the King's Scholarship does not have bond requirements for recipients to work for the Thai Government. King's Scholars have the freedom to choose their area of study, and many have gone on to hold prominent positions in the public and private spheres. The scholarships were awarded by King Bhumibol Adulyadej, although as of late they have not been presented in person. In later years, scholarships are now awarded by Princess Maha Chakri Sirindhorn on behalf of the king.

The scholarship was first awarded by King Chulalongkorn, and until its cancellation in 1933, after the change of government to a constitutional monarchy, was awarded to two students annually. The scholarship in its current form was initiated by King Bhumibol, as a revival of the programme, in 1965.

== Selection Process ==
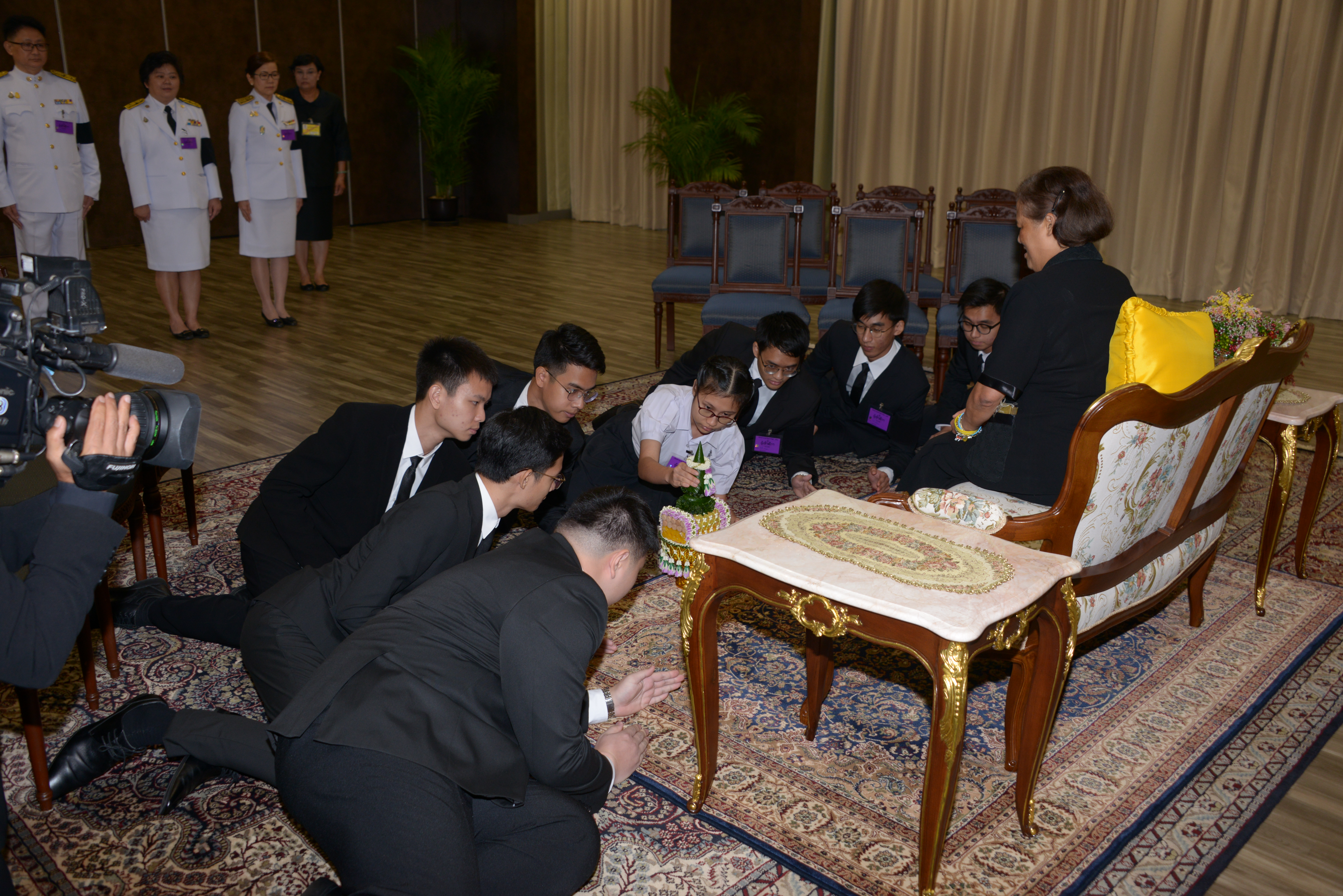
Televised royal audience granted by Princess Maha Chakri Sirindhorn

All Thai high school seniors enrolled in the academic year are eligible candidates for the scholarship. The qualifying examination is the same national subject tests that are also used for Thai university education and other government scholarships. The examinations are administered in the November of each year, from which candidates ranking in the single digits are selected for interviews conducted by the OCSC, which last three days. Prospective scholars are vetted through select assessment centers.

In a typical year, up to nine King's Scholars may be named. The names of the 9 highest-scoring candidates are published on the OCSC website in ranked order. However, fewer than nine of the highest-scoring candidates may be selected in any given year, depending upon individual performance. Following a policy change introduced by the OCSC in 2021, the final rank of each of the nine King's Scholars, formerly based on national examination scores, is now determined by interview performance. Furthermore, to be eligible for final selection, the candidate must earn a total of at least 70 points in the interview. In 2022, only five candidates were granted the scholarship.

== Evolution of the King's Scholarship ==
National scholars have been dispatched for overseas studies since the Sukhothai Period, with the aim of developing national expertise in key disciplines and accumulating experience from foreign countries to bring to bear upon the Thai nation and society.

Initially, Thailand dispatched scholars to only a handful of countries, and for a limited range of disciplines. However, today, Thailand has scholastic footprints in over 40 countries in virtually all major disciplines.

In the Sukhothai Period, the Thai court sent monks to Lanka (currently Sri Lanka) to peruse and receive training in Buddhist scriptures, as well as in pottery from China.

In the Ayudtthaya Period, court officials were sent to cultivate expertise in modern crafts and sciences, including fountain construction, civil engineering, metallurgy, as well as foreign culture in France.

In the Rattanakosin Period, during the reign of King Rama III, Thai individuals were sent to study maritime navigation. An eminent commoner by the name of "Chuen" was also dispatched.

During the reign of King Rama IV, the Thai court sent scholars "Tod Bunnag" and "Ted Bunnag" to pursue studies in England, along with a diplomatic mission in 1857. In addition to scholars, the Thai administrative body at the time also dispatched officials for specific studies in publishing and clockwork, as well as for governance and public policy in Singapore in 1861.

The reign of King Rama V saw the dispatch of 206 Thai students in total for overseas studies in England, Germany, Austria, Hungary, Denmark, and France. Two King's Scholarships were awarded annually. Emphasis was placed on the study of the English language, the French and German languages, mathematics, as well as designated studies based on individual ability in military arts, diplomacy, law, medicine, and engineering. A distinction was made between those titled "King's Scholars", and Scholars affiliated with ministries, who would serve in civil service capacities after their studies. For the first time, nationwide selection examinations were formally administered.

During the reign of King Rama VI, the Thai court dispatched 304 on national scholarships. Due to some financial instability and fiscal challenges of Thailand after the first World War, the privy council and the finance ministry resolved to suspend the scholarship programs temporarily, except for the King's Scholarship, which continued to be awarded. The King's Scholarship would also be suspended later.

Following the regime change to a constitutional monarchy, the Office of Civil Service Commission was tasked with administering examinations for national scholarships and higher education supervision. The program was also further strengthened and systematized.

King Bhumibol revived the King's Scholarship in its current form in 1953, increasing the number of recipients each year from two to (up to) nine. Additionally, the scholarship was diversified to make for a wider and more equitable reach across socioeconomic milieus. During the same decade, Singapore's Queen's Scholarship was also revived as the Singapore State Scholarship, which later evolved into the President's Scholarship as it is known today.
