= Chaophraya Thammasakmontri =

Siamese minister and politician

Chao Phraya Thammasakmontri
- เจ้าพระยาธรรมศักดิ์มนตรี
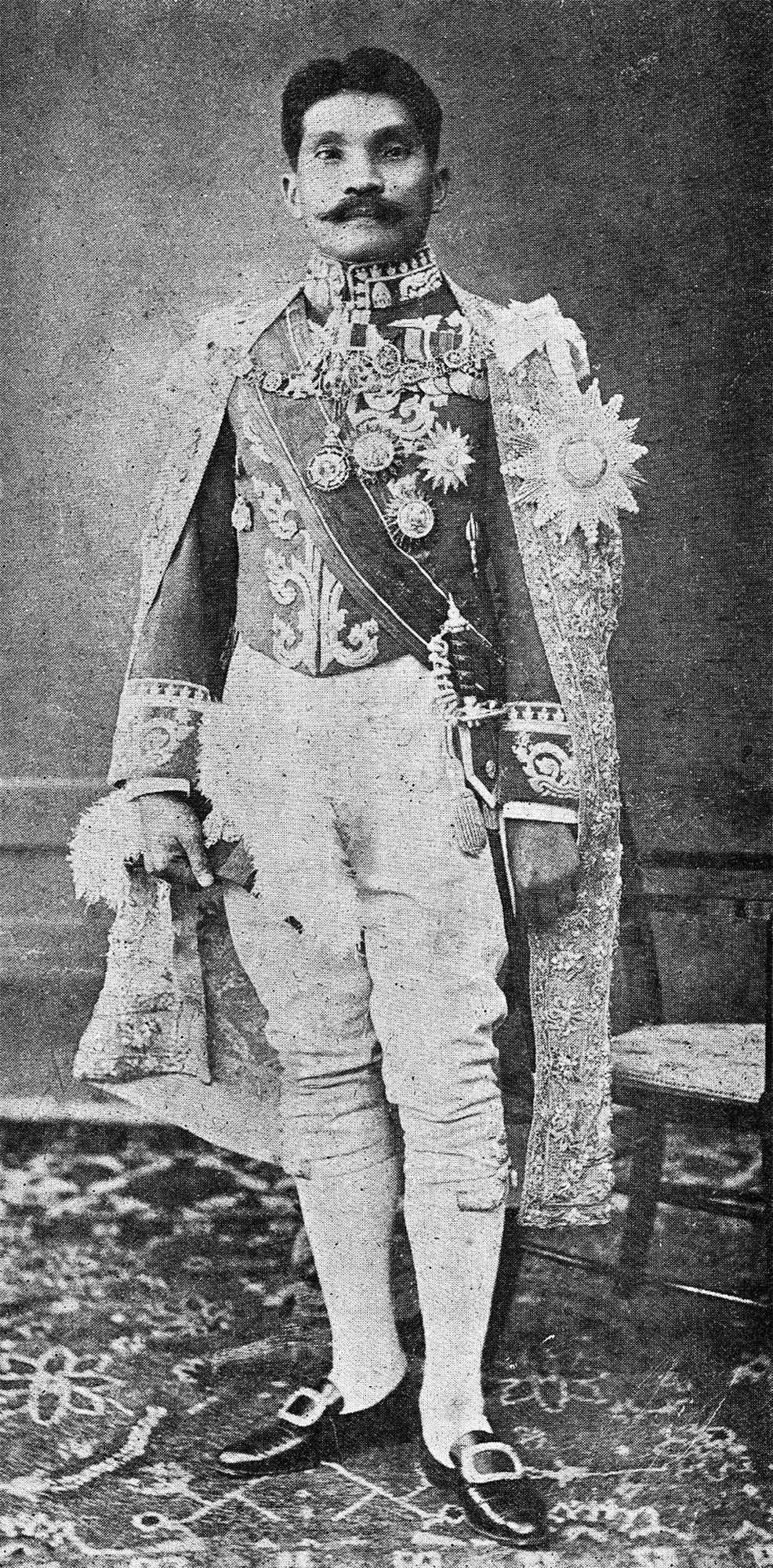

Speaker of the House of Representatives and President of the National Assembly of Thailand
- In office 15 December 1933 – 26 February 1934
- Monarch: Prajadhipok
- Prime Minister: Phraya Phahon
- Preceded by: Chao Phraya Phichaiyat
- Succeeded by: Phraya Sorayuthaseni
- In office 28 June 1932 – 1 September 1932
- Monarch: Prajadhipok
- Prime Minister: Phraya Manopakorn Nitithada
- Preceded by: Position established
- Succeeded by: Chao Phraya Phichaiyat

Minister of Public Instruction
- In office 19 June 1916 – 3 August 1926
- Preceded by: Chao Phraya Phrasadet Surentharathibodi
- Succeeded by: Prince Dhani Nivat

Personal details
- Born: Sanan Devahastin na Ayudhya; 1 January 1877 Bangkok, Siam
- Died: 1 February 1943 (aged 66) Bangkok, Siam
- Education: Borough Road College
- House: Devahastin
- Dynasty: Chakri

Sanan Devahastin na Ayudhya (also spelled Thephasadin among other variants; Thai: สนั่น เทพหัสดิน ณ อยุธยา, RTGS: Sanan Thep-hatsadin Na Ayutthaya, pronounced [sā.nàn tʰêːp.hàt.sā.dīn náʔ ʔā.jút.tʰā.jāː]; 1 January 1877 – 1 February 1943), better known by his noble title Chao Phraya Thammasakmontri (เจ้าพระยาธรรมศักดิ์มนตรี, pronounced [t͡ɕâːw.pʰrā.jāː tʰām.mā.sàk.mōn.trīː]), was an educator, writer and senior government officer of Siam/Thailand. He served as Minister of Public Instruction from 1915–1926, and was the first President of the National Assembly, serving from 28 June – 1 September 1932 and from 15 December 1933 – 26 February 1934.

== Personal life ==
Sanan Devahastin na Ayudhya was born near the Hua Met Shrine, Saphan Han district, Phra Nakhon province, Bangkok, on 1 January 1877. When he was eight years old his father died and his life changed, although this misfortune proved providential in some ways to his future career as an educator, minister and key member of the court of King Rama VI. Despite being the son of a senior nobleman and a direct descendant of King Rama I, he helped mothers with gardening and trading, and was contracted to undertake buttonhole stitching from a young age. Through these enterprises, he learned to be hardworking, compassionate, and thrifty, and not to be discouraged by unforeseen drawbacks - all valuable lessons that enabled him to flourish in both his education and his later work as Minister of Public Instruction, a position similar to Minister of Education today.

== Education and career ==
Senan Devahastin Na Aydhaya studied at Wat Bophitphimuk School, Suankularb Wittayalai School and Sunanta School, followed by the Teacher Training School from 1892 - 1894, where he earned a teaching certificate and became one of the first graduates in the initial cohort of qualified schoolteachers in Thailand. He taught for approximately two years, and then on 4 May 1896, as a scholarship student with the Thai Ministry of Education, he left Thailand to continue his studies at Borough Road College in Isleworth, west London (later incorporated into Brunel University), under the direction of Sir Robert Laurie Morant.

After his studies in Britain and following a three-month study tour of India and Myanmar, he returned to Thailand and established the Thai education system based on the British school system. He was awarded the title Chao Phraya Thammasakmontri and became Lord Chamberlain in the King's Court. Known as the father of modern Thai education, Chao Phraya Thammasakmontri laid the foundations of contemporary learning in the country and was one of the forward-thinking educators who helped found and build Chulalongkorn University, the country's first higher education institution.

After resigning from government service, Chao Phraya Thammasakmontri collaborated with his eldest daughter, Chailai Thephasadin Na Ayudhaya, to convert his family home into Satree Chulanak School to promote education and provide scholarships for talented young students. A "reformist aristocrat and an early figure of public intellectual", Chao Phraya Thammasakmontri, also known as Khru Thep, "initiated the use of verse as a medium for political and social commentary". A volume of his poems and writings has recently been published by Butterfly Book, an independent Bangkok publishing house set up by Chao Phraya Thammasakmontri's late granddaughter, the best-selling Thai author Phakawadee Utamote, and author and publisher, Makut Onrutdee.

== Residence ==
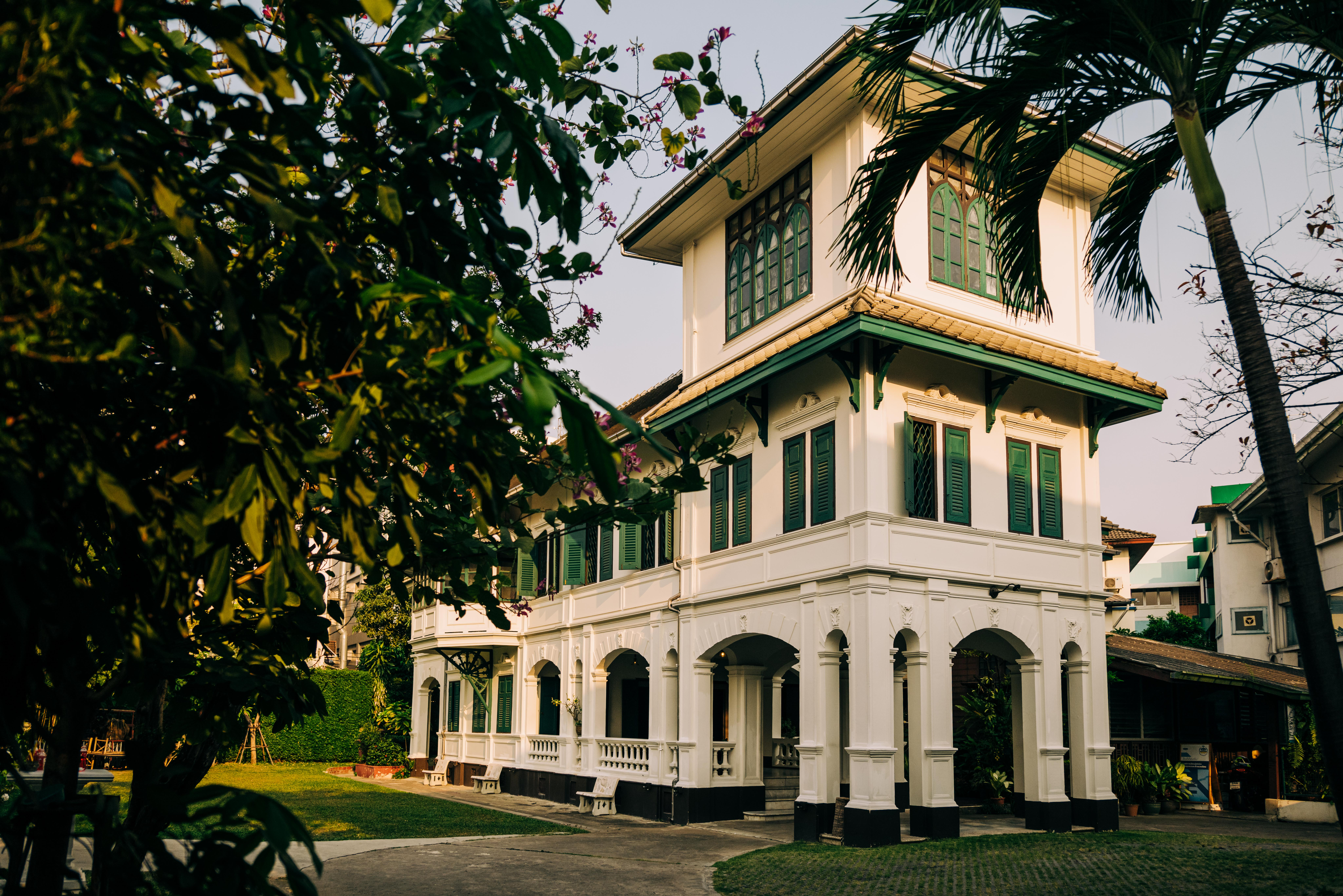
Photo of Bangkok 1899, Ban Chao Phraya Thammasakmontri after renovation in 2018

Following his marriage to Lady Tawin Salak, the young couple were given a grand new home as a wedding present by the bride's father, Phraya Sriphuripricha, in the Nang Loeng neighbourhood in Pom Prap Sattru Phai district, part of Bangkok's old town. The prominent, Western-style Neoclassical mansion is an architectural showpiece and important legacy of Bangkok's historical and cultural heritage. Built in 1899, it was commissioned, designed and constructed by the Italian architect, Mario Tamagno, designer of the Ananta Samakhom Throne Hall, Neilson Hays Library and Hua Lamphong Railway Station. The white house with green eaves on Nakhon Sawan Road, replete with imported white Italian marble, teak floors, delicate stucco designs and intricate patterns on the beams, arches and vents, reflects the Italian architect's style and the European influences of the time.

Chao Phraya Thammasakmontri's house, now owned by his descendants, reopened in 2019 as a cultural & civic hub. Renamed "Bangkok 1899," both the house and its gardens opened to the public in February 2019 to promote the arts, cultural exhibitions and the arts in education, with a focus on sustainability. By reopening the house to the public as a cultural & civic hub, Bangkok 1899 commemorates the life and work of Chao Phraya Thammasakmontri, and continues his idea of using education as a means of social, national, cultural and individual development. Creative Migration, a non-profit international arts organization based in Los Angeles and Bangkok, established Bangkok 1899 (and spearheaded the restoration) in partnership with Na Projects. Founding support was provided by The Rockefeller Foundation and Ford Philanthropy.

== Death ==
Chao Phraya Thammasakmontri died from a heart attack on February 1, 1943, at his house in Nakhon Sawan Road, Bangkok. He was 67.

== Royal decorations ==
Chuan was awarded the following royal decorations in the Honours System of Thailand:

- Ratana Varabhorn Order of Merit
- Knight Grand Cross (First Class) of The Most Illustrious Order of Chula Chom Klao
- Knight Grand Cross (First Class) of the Most Exalted Order of the White Elephant
- Knight Grand Cross (First Class) of Order of the Crown of Thailand
- King Rama V Royal Cypher Medal
- King Rama VI Royal Cypher Medal
- King Rama VII Royal Cypher Medal
