= Regent of Thailand =

Exercises monarchical functions in their absence or interregnum

- ผู้สำเร็จราชการแทนพระองค์
- Incumbent; Vacant since 1 December 2016
- Style: His or Her Excellency
- Type: Acting Head of State
- Appointer: Monarch
- Term length: Until the monarch reaches the age of majority or until accession as Sovereign or until the monarch is back in the country
- Inaugural holder: Prayurawongse (as sinecure); Sri Suriwongse (de facto)
- Formation: 1851; 175 years ago (as sinecure); 1868; 158 years ago (de facto)

A regent of Thailand (Thai: ผู้สำเร็จราชการแทนพระองค์) is a person who exercises the official functions of a monarch of Thailand when the monarch is incapable of functioning or during a period of interregnum.

== Appointment ==
=== Old royal customs ===
Ancient custom dictates that the heir to the last king rule only as a regent and not as a king until he is officially consecrated. An unconsecrated king is not considered qualified to carry out the divine and priestly function of a Devarāja (or God-king). Until the coronation rites are completed the new king must exclude the prefix Phrabat (พระบาท) from his royal title, he cannot enact a royal command, nor sit under the nine-tiered umbrella (he must make do with only seven tiers). As a result, it was customary for a king to go through the coronation ceremonies as soon as he had succeeded to the throne.

=== Modern era ===
According to the constitution of Thailand 2017, there might be a regent when the monarch is unable to function and there will be a regent when the throne is vacant.

==== Incapacity of monarch ====
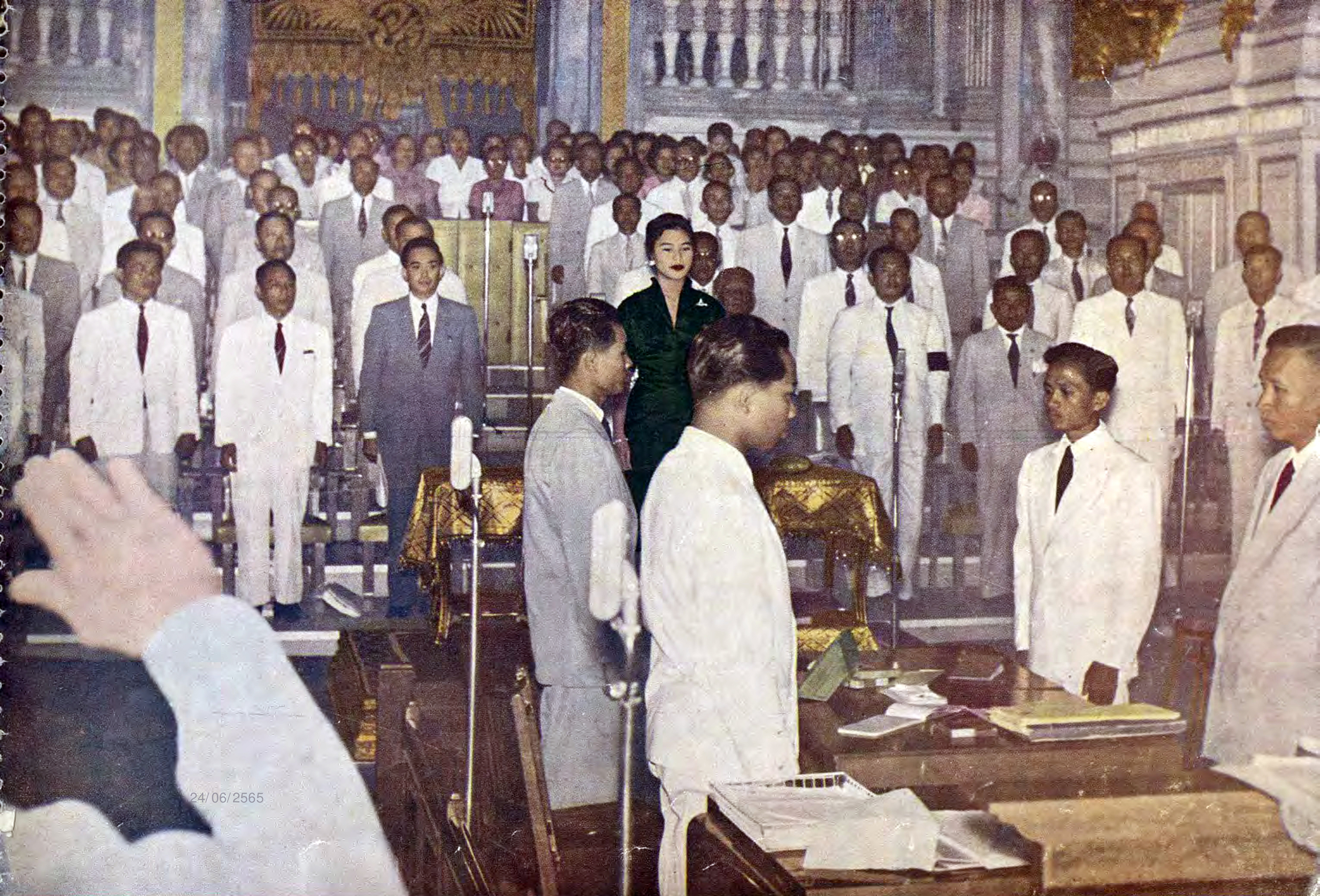
Queen Sirikit took an oath of office amongst the House of Representatives convened at the Ananta Samakhom Throne Hall on 20 September 1956 when she was appointed regent by her husband, King Bhumibol Adulyadej.

In accordance with the 2017 constitution, if the monarch is to leave the country or is unable to perform his duties for whatever reason, he may appoint any regent or council of regency. If he does make an appointment, the president of the National Assembly of Thailand will countersign the appointment.

If the monarch does not or cannot appoint any regent due to his minority or for any other reason and the Privy Council of Thailand finds the regency is necessary, the Privy Council will nominate a regent or council of regency to the president of the National Assembly for further appointment in the name of the monarch. The nominees are required to be those having been picked beforehand by the monarch and they must be nominated in accordance with the order of precedence designated beforehand by the monarch also.

Until a regent or council of regency is appointed, the president of the Privy Council will serve as the regent ad interim.

The constitution also requires an appointed regent to take the following oath of office amongst the National Assembly before assuming office:

I, (name of the regent), do hereby declare that I will be loyal to His Majesty King (the king's name), and will faithfully carry out my duties in the interest of the nation and her people, and will also uphold and observe the Constitution of the Kingdom of Thailand in all sincerity.

Formerly, the law required regency during the incapacity of the monarch. In January 2017, King Rama X made an unprecedented move to change a draft constitution (later promulgated as the 2017 constitution) by removing the need for the monarch to appoint any regent in such an event, despite the draft having already been approved in a referendum.

==== Interregnum ====
In accordance with the 2017 constitution, when the throne becomes vacant, the president of the Privy Council of Thailand will act as the regent ad interim until a monarch is installed.

But if the vacancy takes place when there already is a regent, appointed by the previous monarch or by the president of the National Assembly due to the monarch's incapacity, that regent will continue to function until a monarch is enthroned. If the appointed regent is unable to function, the president of the Privy Council will also serve as the regent ad interim.

== Flag ==
The regent is given an official flag by the Flag Act 1979. It is a white square flag with a shield of the national flag at the centre, topped by the mythological bird garuda, which is the national emblem of Thailand.

== List of regents ==
=== Fourth Reign ===
Portrait	Name	Date of Appointment	Ceased to be Regent	Note
King Mongkut (Rama IV)
Prayurawongse	Somdet Chao Phraya Borom; Maha Prayurawongse (Dit Bunnag)	1851	1855	The post established for the first time in Rattanakosin era. Appointed as a sinecure, functionally as prime minister.

=== Fifth Reign ===
Portrait	Name	Date of Appointment	Ceased to be Regent	Note
King Chulalongkorn (Rama V)
Sri Suriwongse	Somdet Chao Phraya Borom; Maha Sri Suriwongse (Chuang Bunnag)	1 October 1868	16 November 1873	Appointed regent by the Council of Ministers, until the king reached his majority at the age of 20.
Saovabha Phongsri	Queen Saovabha Phongsri	7 April 1897	16 December 1897	Appointed regent for the duration of the king's first visit to Europe. After the king's return, her title was elevated to Queen Regent.
Vajiravudh	Crown Prince; Maha Vajiravudh	27 March 1907	17 November 1907	Appointed regent for the duration of the king's second visit to Europe.

=== Sixth Reign ===
Portrait	Name	Date of Appointment	Ceased to be Regent	Note
King Vajiravudh (Rama VI)
Prajadhipok	Prince Prajadhipok Sakdidej, the Prince of Sukhothai	1925	26 November 1925	Appointed regent during the illness of the king, after the king's death on 26 November 1925, himself succeeded to the throne as King Rama VII.

=== Seventh Reign ===
Portrait	Name	Date of Appointment	Ceased to be Regent	Note
King Prajadhipok (Rama VII)
Paribatra Sukhumbhand	Prince Paribatra Sukhumbandhu, the Prince of Nakhon Sawan	9 April 1932	8 May 1932	Appointed regent for the duration of the king's summer holiday in Hua Hin, Prachuap Khiri Khan Province.
Narisara Nuvadtivongs	Prince Chitcharoen, the Prince Narisara Nuwattiwong	12 January 1934	2 March 1935	Appointed regent while the king visited Europe for medical treatment, regency ended with the king's abdication of the throne.

=== Eighth Reign ===
Portrait	Name	Date of Appointment	Ceased to be Regent	Note
King Ananda Mahidol (Rama VIII)
	Cabinet of Siam acting as regency council pro tempore	2 March 1935	7 March 1935	The Cabinet of Siam filled-in as a regency council pro tempore during a brief interregnum in according to Constitution of Siam 1935
	Prince Oscar Anuvatana	7 March 1935	12 August 1935	Appointed president of the three members regency council, during the king's minority (10 years of age at the time) and absence, as he was living in Switzerland. Died in office (committed suicide).
	Prince Aditya Dibabha	7 March 1935	31 July 1944	Succeeded Prince Oscar as president. Later resigned from office and ceased to be regent, died in 1945.
	Chao Phraya Yomarath (Pan Sukhum)	7 March 1935	30 December 1938	Died in office
	Chao Phraya Bijayendra Yodhin (General Um Indrayodhin)	21 August 1935	21 July 1942	Appointed regent to replace Prince Oscar. Died in office.
	Luang Praditmanutham (Pridi Banomyong)	16 December 1941	20 September 1945	Appointed regent to replace Chao Phraya Yomarath, previously held office as Minister of Finance. After the resignation of Prince Aditya Dibabha became the sole regent, until the return of the king in 1946. Later became the 7th prime minister of Thailand in 1946.

=== Ninth Reign ===
Portrait	Name	Date of Appointment	Ceased to be Regent	Note
King Bhumibol Adulyadej (Rama IX)
Standard of the Parliament of Thailand	Regency council pro tempore under the Senate of Siam	9 June 1946	16 June 1946	After the death of Ananda Mahidol, 3 most senior senators were given the power of regency pro tempore under the Constitution of 1946 until the appointment of permanent regency council The regency council was composed of: 1. Phra Suthammavinijchai; 2. Praya Nonrajasuvaj; 3. Sanguan Juthathemi
Prince Rangsit Prayurasakdi	Prince Rangsit Prayurasakdi, the Prince of Chainat	16 June 1946	7 November 1947	Appointed two person regency council, when the king decided to return to his studies at the University of Lausanne in Switzerland.
Phraya Manavaratsevi	Phraya Manavaratsevi (Plot Wichian Na Songkhla)	16 June 1946	7 November 1947	Appointed two person regency council, when the king decided to return to his studies at the University of Lausanne in Switzerland.
Standard of the Regent of Siam	Regency under the Privy Council	9 November 1947	23 January 1949	After the Siamese coup d'état of 1947 a new Privy Council was created and was given the power of regency under the Temporary Constitution of 1947. The council was composed of: 1. Prince Rangsit Prayurasakdi, the Prince of Chainat; 2. Prince Dhani Nivat, the Prince Bidyalabh Bridhyakon; 3. Prince Alongkot, the Prince Adireksorn Udomsakdi; 4. Phraya Manavaratsevi (Plod Vichear na Songkhla); 5. General Adun Adundetcharat (Bat Phuengphrakhun); The council was relieved of the regency with the promulgation of the 1949 Constitution.
Prince Rangsit Prayurasakdi	Prince Rangsit Prayurasakdi, the Prince of Chainat	23 June 1949	Late 1949	Appointed sole regent by recommendation of the National Assembly. Regency ended when the king returned to Thailand for his coronation ceremony on 5 May 1950.
Prince Rangsit Prayurasakdi	Prince Rangsit Prayurasakdi, the Prince of Chainat	5 June 1950	7 March 1951	Appointed regent during the king's travel and stay in Switzerland. Died in Office.
Standard of the Regent of Siam	Prince Dhani Nivat, the Prince Bidyalabh Bridhiyakon	12 March 1951	29 November 1952	Replace Prince Rangsit as regent. Regency ends after the abolition of constitution of Thailand 1949
Seal of the Prime Minister's Office of Thailand, the Seal of the Royal Thai Government	Coup Group in charge as the Cabinet of Thailand acting as regency council pro tempore	29 November 1952	3 December 1952	Coup Group acted as the Cabinet of Thailand filled-in a regency council duty in according to Constitution of Siam 1935; Regency ends after the King returns to Thailand.
	Queen Sirikit of Thailand	22 October 1956	5 November 1956	Appointed regent during the king's absence as a Bhikkhu monk in the Buddhist Sangha (at Wat Bowonniwet Vihara). Afterwards, her title was elevated to Queen Regent.
Princess Srinagarindra	Princess Srinagarindra, the Princess Mother of Thailand	18 December 1959	21 December 1959	State visit to the Republic of Vietnam by the king and queen.
Princess Srinagarindra	Princess Srinagarindra, the Princess Mother of Thailand	9 February 1960	16 February 1960	State visit to the Republic of Indonesia by the king and queen.
Princess Srinagarindra	Princess Srinagarindra, the Princess Mother of Thailand	2 March 1960	5 March 1960	State visit to the Union of Burma by the king and queen.
Princess Srinagarindra	Princess Srinagarindra, the Princess Mother of Thailand	14 June 1960	1960	State visit to the United States of America and European countries by the king and queen.
Princess Srinagarindra	Princess Srinagarindra, the Princess Mother of Thailand	11 March 1962	22 March 1962	State visit to the Islamic Republic of Pakistan by the king and queen.
Princess Srinagarindra	Princess Srinagarindra, the Princess Mother of Thailand	20 June 1962	27 June 1962	State visit to the Federation of Malaya by the king and queen.
Princess Srinagarindra	Princess Srinagarindra, the Princess Mother of Thailand	17 August 1962	13 September 1962	State visit to New Zealand and Australia by the king and queen.
Standard of the Regent of Siam	Prince Dhani Nivat, the Prince Bidyalabh Bridhiyakon (President of the Privy Council)	27 May 1963	6 June 1963	State visit to Japan and Republic of China by the king and queen.
Standard of the Regent of Siam	Prince Dhani Nivat, the Prince Bidyalabh Bridhiyakon (President of the Privy Council)	9 July 1963	14 July 1963	State visit to the Philippines by the king and queen.
Princess Srinagarindra	Princess Srinagarindra, the Princess Mother of Thailand	12 September 1964	6 October 1964	Visit to the Kingdom of Greece on the occasion of the marriage of King Constantine II and Anne-Marie of Denmark and the state visit to the Republic of Austria by the king and queen.
Princess Srinagarindra	Princess Srinagarindra, the Princess Mother of Thailand	15 July 1966	1966	State visit to the United Kingdom by the king and queen.
Princess Srinagarindra	Princess Srinagarindra, the Princess Mother of Thailand	23 April 1967	30 April 1967	State visit to the Imperial State of Iran by the king and queen.
Princess Srinagarindra	Princess Srinagarindra, the Princess Mother of Thailand	6 June 1967	1967	State visit to the United States of America and Canada by the king and queen.

=== Tenth Reign ===
Portrait	Name	Date of Appointment	Ceased to be Regent	Note
King Vajiralongkorn (Rama X)
	General Prem Tinsulanonda	13 October 2016	1 December 2016	As the President of the Privy Council, he became regent pro tempore upon the death of King Bhumibol Adulyadej under Constitution of the Kingdom of Thailand (Interim) 2014. This period was technically considered as an interregnum, as Vajiralongkorn did not proclaim until 1 December and functioned as the crown prince in all royal ceremonies. Legally served during the first seven weeks of King Vajiralongkorn's reign.

== See also ==
- Monarchy of Thailand
- List of Thai Monarchs
- List of Thai royal consorts
- Crown Prince of Thailand
- Regent
- List of regents
- Constitution of Thailand

== Sources ==
- Dhani Nivat (1949), The Coronation His Majesty Prajadhipok King of Siam (PDF), Bangkok, Thailand: Thai Kasem Publishing, OCLC 940955198, archived from the original (PDF) on 2022-10-15
- Poopongpan, Woraporn (2007). "Thai Kingship during the Ayutthaya Period : A Note on Its Divine Aspects Concerning Indra" (PDF). Silpakorn University International Journal. 7. Silpakorn University: 143–171. Archived from the original (PDF) on 2017-09-06.
- Quaritch Wales, H. G. (1931), Siamese State Ceremonies: Their History and Function, London, United Kingdom: Routledge, ISBN 0853880077
