= Devahastin family =

Thai family of royal descent

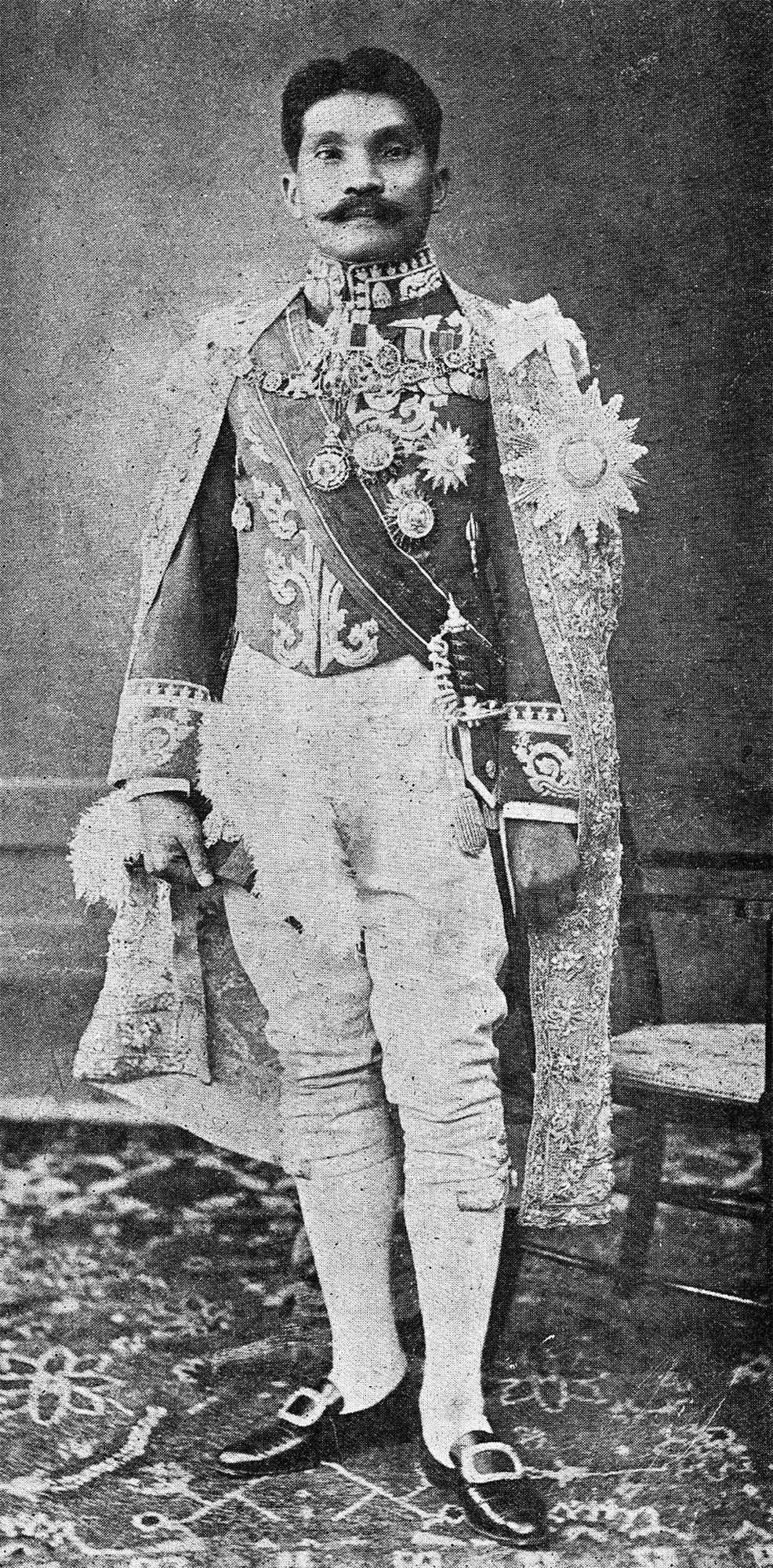
Chaophraya Thammasakmontri (Sanan Devahastin na Ayudhya), to whom the surname was first granted

The Devahastin or Thephasadin family (Thai: เทพหัสดิน, RTGS: Thephatsadin) is a Thai family of royal descent, tracing its origins back to Prince Thepharirak, a nephew of King Rama I. Its best-known member was Sanan Devahastin na Ayudhya, better known by his noble title Chaophraya Thammasakmontri, who served as a senior government official of the 1920s–1930s.

== History ==
The family traces its descent from Phraya Ratchaphakdi (Mom Rajawongse Chang), (Note: Phraya Ratchaphakdi is a noble title; the person's given name was Chang, with mom rajawongse being a title indicating royal descent.) described in various sources as either a grandson or a son of Prince Thepharirak, a nephew of King Rama I.

The family name was granted by King Vajiravudh (Rama VI) to Phraya Phaisansinlapasat (Sanan Devahastin na Ayudhya, later to become Chaophraya Thammasakmontri) in 1913 when he decreed the use of surnames. The romanized spelling Devahastin, which does not reflect the exact Thai pronunciation, is derived from the Sanskrit root words deva and hastin, which roughly mean 'god' and 'elephant' (a reference to the name Chang, which also means 'elephant'). The name is suffixed with na Ayudhya, indicating royal descent.

== People ==
Notable members of the family include:

- Chaophraya Thammasakmontri (Sanan Devahastin na Ayudhya, 1877–1943), senior government official, grandson of Chang
- Phraya Thephatsadin (Phat Devahastin na Ayudhya, 1878–1951), military general, nephew of Sanan
- Phraya Anukitwithun (Santhat Devahastin na Ayudhya, 1880/1881–1948), first Commissioner of Chulalongkorn University, brother of Sanan
- Naga Devahastin na Ayudhya (1901–1969), Permanent Secretary of the Ministry of Education, nephew of Sanan
- Saphrang Devahastin na Ayudhya (1904–1985), government minister
- Banyat Devahastin na Ayudhya (1905–1976), government minister
- Preeya Chimchom née Devahastin na Ayudhya (1915–2007), architect and city planner, daughter of Sanan
- Yos Devahastin na Ayudhya (1917–1997), military general and government minister
- Wit Devahastin na Ayudhya (born 1950), military general, political strategist for Palang Pracharath Party, Secretary-General of the National Olympic Committee of Thailand; son of Yos
- Nut Devahastin na Ayudhya (born 1984), actor, grandson of Yos and nephew of Wit

In 2010, a member of the family, identified by the nickname Praewa, was involved in a car accident with a public passenger van on the Don Mueang Tollway, which resulted in the deaths of nine van passengers. She was driving underage without a licence, and the case sparked a huge amount of online public outrage. The case resurfaced in 2019, when it was revealed that the victims' families had not yet received their court-ordered financial compensation, prompting the Devahastin family to hold a press conference where, among other things, it pointed out that the clan comprised over 200 individual families and should not be blamed for the actions of one individual.
