= Rangsit Prayurasakdi =

Rangsit Prayurasakdi รังสิตประยูรศักดิ์
- Prince of Chai Nat
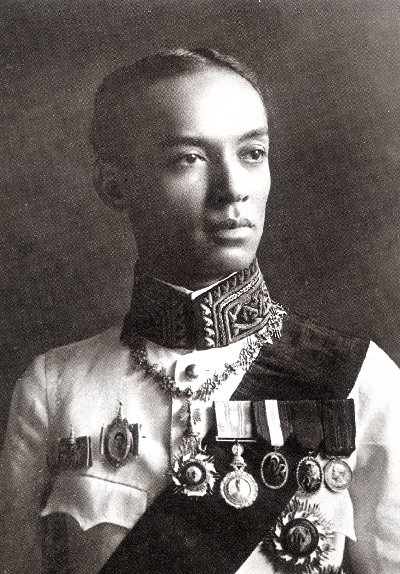

President of the Regency Council
- In office: 16 June 1946 – 7 March 1951
- Monarch: Bhumibol Adulyadej (Rama IX)

President of the Privy Council
- In office: 25 March 1950 – 7 March 1951
- Monarch: Bhumibol Adulyadej (Rama IX)
- Predecessor: Prince Dhani Nivat
- Successor: Prince Alongkot
- Born: 12 November 1885; Bangkok, Siam
- Died: 7 March 1951 (aged 65); Bangkok, Thailand
- Spouse: Elisabeth Rangsit na Ayudhaya (née Scharnberger)
- Issue: Prince Piyarangsit Rangsit; Prince Sanidh Prayurasakdi Rangsit; Princess Charulaksana Kalyani Rangsit
Names
- Prince Rangsit Prayurasakdi, Prince of Chainat
- House: Rangsit (Chakri dynasty)
- Father: Chulalongkorn (Rama V)
- Mother: Chao Chom Manda Nueng

Rangsit Prayurasakdi, Prince of Chai Nat (Thai: สมเด็จพระเจ้าบรมวงศ์เธอ พระองค์เจ้ารังสิตประยูรศักดิ์ กรมพระยาชัยนาทนเรนทร; RTGS: Somdet Phra Chao Borommawong Thoe Pra Ong Chao Rangsitprayurasak Krom Phraya Chainatnarenthon; 12 November 1885 – 7 April 1951) was a member of the Thai royal family who founded the Public Health Ministry and served as Regent of Thailand.

== Early life ==
Prince Rangsit was born as the 52nd child of King Chulalongkorn and the second child of Chao Chom Manda Mom Rajawongse Nueng (great-granddaughter of King Rama II), the 22nd wife of Chulalongkorn. After the early death of his mother, Prince Rangsit and his elder sister Princess Yaovabha Bongsanid were adopted by Queen Savang Vadhana. As a result, he grew up as a half-brother and childhood friend of Prince Mahidol. He started his education at the Royal School in the Grand Palace. At the age of 14, he was sent to Germany for his education, at first the Martineum gymnasium in Halberstadt where he graduated with Abitur in 1905 and later the Heidelberg-University in Heidelberg. Though he was more interested in medicine, his father insisted on an education in jurisprudence, which he completed at the Ruprecht Karl University of Heidelberg. He additionally studied philosophy in 1908. It was during his study that he met his wife, Elisabeth Scharnberger (15 September 1892 – 29 September 1973), a German woman whom he married in London on 28 August 1912. The couple had two sons and one daughter:

- Prince Piyarangsit Rangsit (25 December 1913 – 1 February 1990)
- Prince Sanidh Prayurasakdi Rangsit (19 August 1917 – 10 September 1995)
- Princess Charulaksana Kalyani Rangsit (7 August 1924 – 3 August 2012). She relinquished her royal title to marry a commoner on 28 June 1945.

== Life in Siam ==
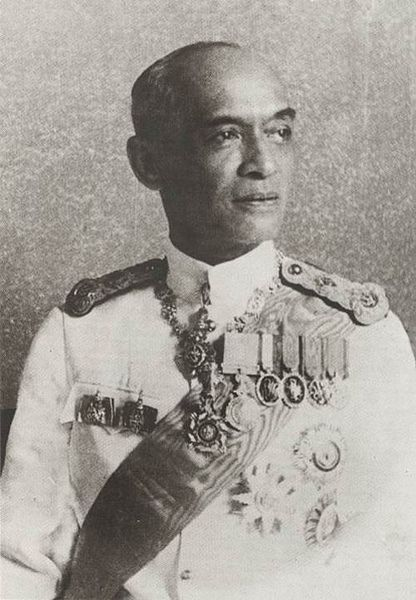
Prince Rangsit Prayurasakdi in 1946

After returning to Siam in 1913, during the reign of his elder brother King Vajiravudh, Prince Rangsit worked to improve Siam's health care system. Today, a statue of Prince Rangsit stands in front of Thailand's Ministry of Public Health, of which he is the founding father. He also worked to improve the nation's university system, serving as the first director-general of the University Affairs Department, and the chairman of the Committee on Planning and Development of Chulalongkorn University.

Following the Siamese Revolution of 1932, Prince Rangsit did not involve himself in politics, but was nevertheless seen as a threat by the pro-fascist military government of Major General Plaek Phibunsongkhram, which arrested the Prince under charges of treason in 1938. This was possibly due to his position as the most senior prince remaining in the country at the time. In prison he spent much of his time in meditation and in the writing of a journal which recounts his childhood memories and experiences of traveling to Europe for the first time in 1899. On 28 September 1943, having been jailed for four years and nine months, Prince Rangsit was released by Plaek's government (a year prior to the release of other political prisoners originally on the covert prison of Tarutao Island since 1941 before being relocated to the Island of Koh Tao in 1944). Along with the release of Plaek's other political prisoners, Prince Rangsit's titles were permanently restored to him by the Khuang-Pridi government which came to power following Phibun's forced resignation in May 1944.

Prince Rangsit is reputed to have had a significant role in ensuring the continuity of the Thai royal family in its transitory phase from the uncertainties which followed the abdication of his younger half-brother King Rama VII to the coronation of his two nephews King Ananda Mahidol and King Bhumibol Adulyadej.

After King Ananda Mahidol's mysterious death in the Grand Palace, Prince Bhumibol, the second child of Rangsit's half-brother Prince Mahidol, was appointed as the new king. Since the new king at first planned to finish his education abroad, Prince Rangsit was appointed Regent of Thailand on 16 June 1946, as well as chairman of the Supreme Council of State in 1947.

== Honours ==
Personal coat of arms of Rangsit Payurasakdi

- Knight of the Most Illustrious Order of the Royal House of Chakri
- Knight Grand Cordon (Special Class) of the Most Illustrious Order of Chula Chom Klao
- Knight Grand Cordon (Special Class) of the Most Exalted Order of the White Elephant
- Recipient of the King Chulalongkorn's Royal Cypher Medal

=== Foreign honours ===
- Baden:
  - Grand Cross of the Order of the Zähringer Lion (1914)

== Death ==
In March 1951, Prince Rangsit died of a heart attack while in bed at Vidyu Palace on Wireless Road in Bangkok. At his death, he was the last surviving son of King Chulalongkorn, having lived 65 years and four months. He was also known to be a great collector of Thai antiques and art works.

The Rangsit Canal and the outskirts of Bangkok known as Rangsit were named in honour of him during his lifetime, although the highway in Bangkok known as Vibhavadi Rangsit is named after his daughter in law, Princess Vibhavadi Rangsit.
