= List of consorts and children of Chulalongkorn =

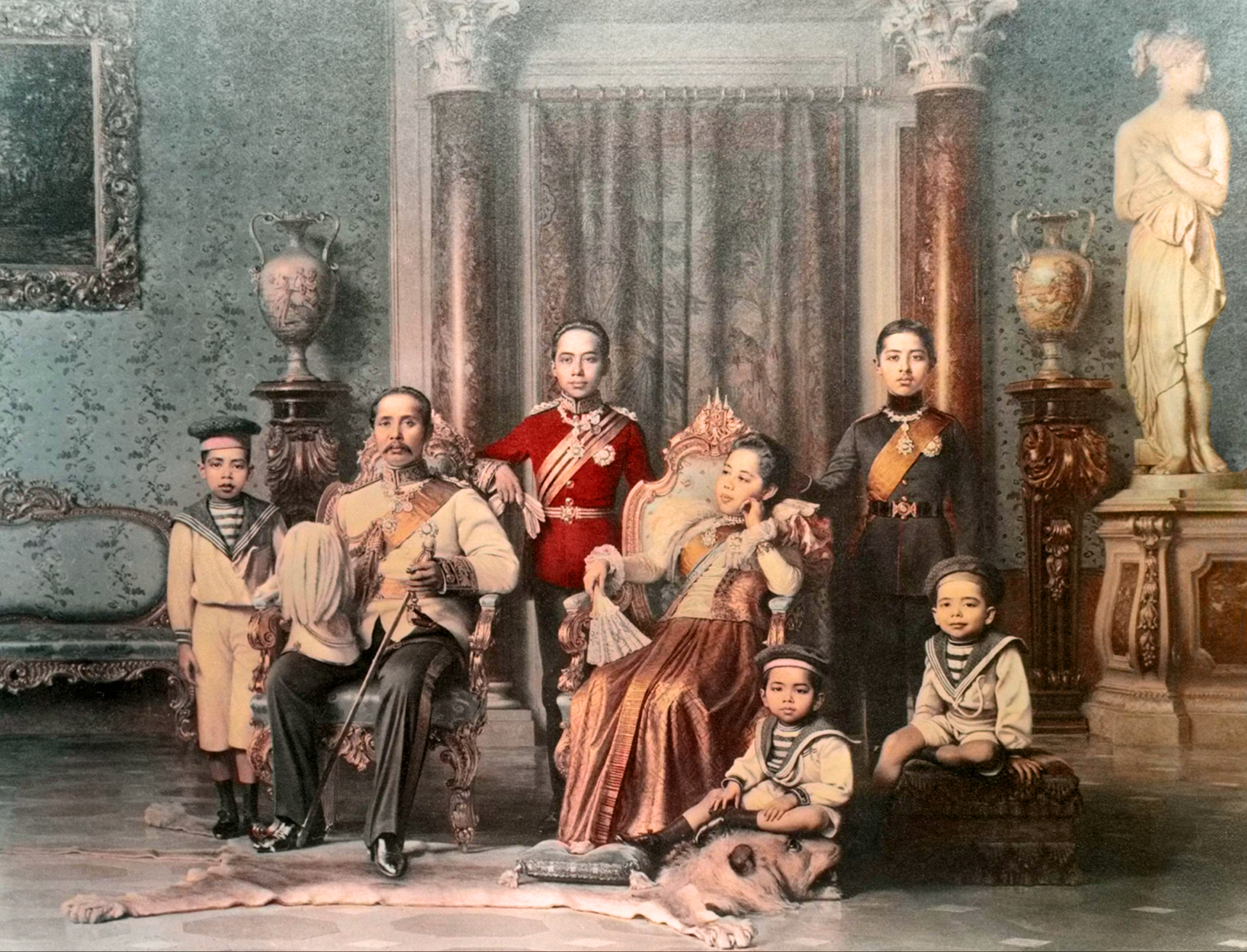
(from left to right:) Prince Asdang Dejavudh; King Chulalongkorn; Crown Prince Maha Vajiravudh; Queen Saovabha Phongsri; Princes Chudadhuj Dharadilok, Chakrabongse Bhuvanath and Prajadhipok Sakdidej

The following is a list of children of Chulalongkorn, King of Siam from 1868 until his death in 1910.

== Ancestors ==
Ancestors of Chulalongkorn, King of Siam

16. (=22.) Thongdi, Prince Father of Siam
8. Rama I of Siam
17. (=23.) Yok
4. (=24.) Rama II of Siam
18. Thong Na Bangxang
9. Nak Na Bangxang
19. Princess Rupsirisobhak Mahanagnari
2. Rama IV of Siam
10. Ngeon Sae-tan
5. Princess Bunrot of Siam
22. (=16.) Thongdi, Prince Father of Siam
11. Kaew, Princess Sri Sudarak
23. (=17.) Yok
1. Rama V of Siam
24. (=4.) Rama II of Siam
12. Rama III of Siam
25. Riam
6. Sirivonge, Prince Matayaphitaksa
26. Phra Aksorn Sombat
13. Sab
27. Bhong Na Phatthalung
3. Princess Ramphoei Siriwong
14. But
7. Noi
15. Chaem
31. Muang Suragupta

Portrait	Name	Parents	Birth	Death
	King Chulalongkorn จุฬาลงกรณ์	King Mongkut; Princess Ramphoei Siriwong	20 September 1853	23 October 1910

== List of consorts ==
No.	Portrait	Name	Parents	Birth	Death	Children	Notes
Supreme Royal Chief Queen
1		Princess Saovabha Phongsri เสาวภาผ่องศรี	King Mongkut; Piam Sucharitakul	1 January 1864	20 October 1919	Bahurada Manimaya; miscarriage; Maha Vajiravudh; Tribejrutama Dhamrong; Chakrabongse Bhuvanath; miscarriage; miscarriage; miscarriage; Siriraj Kakudhabhand; miscarriage; Unnamed daughter; Asdang Dejavudh; miscarriage; miscarriage; Chudadhuj Dharadilok; Prajadhipok Sakdidej	
Royal Queen
2		Princess Sunanda Kumariratana สุนันทากุมารีรัตน์	King Mongkut; Piam Sucharitakul	10 November 1860	31 May 1880	Kannabhorn Bejaratana; miscarriage	
3		Princess Savang Vadhana สว่างวัฒนา	King Mongkut; Piam Sucharitakul	10 September 1862	17 December 1955	Maha Vajirunhis; Isariyalongkorn; Vichitra Chiraprabha; Sommatiwongse Varodaya; Valaya Alongkorn; Sirabhorn Sobhon; miscarriage; miscarriage; Mahidol Adulyadej; Unnamed daughter	
4		Princess Sukhumala Marasri สุขุมาลมารศรี	King Mongkut; Samli Bunnag	10 May 1861	9 July 1927	Suddha Dibyaratana; miscarriage; Paribatra Sukhumbandhu	
Princess Consort
5		Princess Daksinajar ทักษิณชา	King Mongkut; Chan Suksathit	18 September 1852	13 September 1906	Unnamed son	Divorce
6		Princess Piu Ladavalya ปิ๋ว ลดาวัลย์	Ladavalya, Prince Bhumindra Bhakdi; Chin	26 January 1854	21 July 1887	Chandra Saradavara	
7		Princess Bua Ladavalya บัว ลดาวัลย์	Ladavalya, Prince Bhumindra Bhakdi; Chin	28 November 1846	15 October 1901	Yaovamalaya Narumala	
8		Princess Sai Ladavalya สาย ลดาวัลย์	Ladavalya, Prince Bhumindra Bhakdi; Chin	4 September 1862	24 June 1929	Yugala Dighambara; Nabhachara Chamrassri; Malini Nobhadara; Nibha Nobhadol; miscarriage	
9		Princess Dara Rasmi of Chiang Mai ดารารัศมี	Inthawichayanon, Grand Prince of Chiang Mai; Princess Thip Keson of Chiang Mai	26 August 1873	9 December 1933	Vimolnaka Nabisi	
Royal Concubine
10		Mom Rajawongse Khae Phuengbun แข พึ่งบุญ	Prince Nok Phuengbun	1847	13 May 1926	Phongpraphai	
11		Phae Bunnag แพ บุนนาค (later elevated to Chao Khun Phra Prayuravongse)	Won Bunnag, Chao Phraya Surawongwaiwat; Than Pu Ying Im Bunnag	5 November 1854	22 March 1943	Srivilailaksana; Suvabaktra Vilayabanna; Bandhavanna Varobhas	
12		Saeng Kalyanamitra แสง กัลยาณมิตร	Phraya Chaiwichit	4 November 1854	20 December 1898	Isaravongs Vorarajakumara; Nabhanka Nibandhabongs; Beatrice Bhadrayuvadi; Charoensri Chanamayu	
13		Sut Sukumalachandra สุด สุกุมลจันทร์	Chan Sukumalachandra, Phraya Surindrarajseni; Khun Ying Klin Sukumalachandra (née Raktapajit)	1851	4 July 1912	Voralaksanavadi	
14		Talap Ketudat ตลับ เกตุทัต	Phraya Wiangnainaruban; Im	1852	9 June 1929	Ajrabarni Rajkanya; Raphi Phatthanasak	
15		Morakot Phenkul มรกฎ เพ็ญกุล	Peng Phenkul, Chao Phraya Mahindrasaktamrong; Hun	9 July 1855	21 July 1915	Chudharatana Rajakumari; Benbadhanabongse	
16		Mom Rajawongse Yoi Isarankura ย้อย อิศรางกูร	Prince Sobhon Isarankura; Mom Im Isarankura na Ayudhya	14 June 1855	19 April 1896	Orabindu Benyabhak	
17		Uam Bisalayabutra อ่วม พิศลยบุตร	Phraya Phisonsombatboriburn; Prang Sampatisiri	10 April 1856	26 April 1891	Kitiyakara Voralaksana	
18		Chaem Kalyanamitra แช่ม กัลยาณมิตร	Phraya Maha Aummataya; Jaem	5 February 1856	2 January 1909	Pravitra Vadhanodom	
19		Thapthim Rojanadis ทับทิม โรจนดิศ	Phraya Abbhantrikamat; Im	9 December 1857	24 May 1938	Chirapravati Voradej; Praves Vorasamai; Vudhijaya Chalermlabha	
20		Bua บัว		1865	28 July 1916	Unnamed daughter	
21		Mot Bunnag โหมด บุนนาค	Won Bunnag, Chao Phraya Surawongwaiwat; Than Pu Ying Im Bunnag	16 January 1862	30 October 1932	Abhakara Kiartivongse; Oraongka Ankayuba; Suriyong Prayurabandhu	
22		Chan Sukumalachandra จันทร์ สุกุมลจันทร์	Phraya Rajsampharakorn; Aum	23 June 1862	8 March 1911	Sasibongse Prabai	
23		Sai Sukumalachandra สาย สุกุมลจันทร์	Chan Sukhumalachandra, Phraya Surindrarajseni; Khun Ying Klin Sukumalachandra (née Raktapajit)	1857	4 July 1955	Unnamed daughter	
24		Ruean Sundarasaradula เรือน สุนทรศารทูล	Phraya Sundornburi Sriphichaisongkram; Talap Sriphen	1865	2 January 1922	Bismai Bimalasataya	
25		Wat Kalyanamitra วาด กัลยาณมิตร	Nai Sathiraraksa; Prik	7 June 1859	20 August 1918	Purachatra Jayakara	
26		Chao Thipkeson na Chiangmai ทิพเกสร ณ เชียงใหม่	Chao Suriya na Chiangmai; Chao Suvanna na Chiangmai		3 March 1902	Dilok Nobaratana	
27		Mom Rajawongse Nueang Snidvongs เนื่อง สนิทวงศ์	Prince Sai Snidvongs; Mom Khian Snidvongs na Ayudha (née Sasismiti)	22 October 1864	23 November 1885	Yaovabha Bongsanid; Rangsit Prayurasakdi	
28		On Bunnag อ่อน บุนนาค	Thet Bunnag, Chao Phraya Suraphanphisut; Than Pu Ying Au Bunnag (née Wongsaroj)	19 February 1868	29 January 1969	Oraprabandh Rambai; miscarriage; Adisaya Suriyabha	
29		Phrom พร้อม	Phraya Bhisanulokathibodi; Klin		8 February 1899	Prabha Bannabilaya; Prabai Bannabilas; Samaya Vudhirodom; miscarriage; miscarriage; Vapi Busbakara	
30		Wong Netrayana วง เนตรายน	Phraya Akarajnakaphakdi; Arun			Komala Saovamala	
31		Sae Rojanadis แส โรจนดิศ	Phraya Abbhantrikamat; Bang	September 1868	14 October 1925	Khajera Chirapradidha; Abbhantripaja; Dibyalangkarn	
32		Mom Rajawongse Keson Snidvongs เกสร สนิทวงศ์	Prince Svasti Snidvongs; Mom Phoy Snidvongs na Ayudhya		17 March 1909	Isariyabhorn; miscarriage; Anusara Siriprasadh	
33		Chum Krairoek ชุ่ม ไกรฤกษ์	Chuang Khairoek, Phra Mongkolrat Rajamontri; Khai	19 September 1869	22 June 1911	Adorn Dibyanibha; Suchitra Bharani	
34		Luean Niyavananda เลื่อน นิยะวานนท์	Phra Narindrabhorn; Prik	8 February 1875	12 November 1947	Lavad Voraong; Urubongs Rajsombhoj	
35		Mom Rajawongse Chiu Kapitatha จิ๋ว กปิตถา	Prince Vattana Kapitatha			Unnamed daughter	
36		Hem Amatyakul เหม อมาตยกุล	Phraya Dhamasarnniti Vichitbhakdi; Seang	21 September 1864	9 July 1931	miscarriage; Hemvadi	
37		Khian Kalyanamitra เขียน กัลยาณมิตร	Nai Sathiraraksa; Prik				Divorce
38		Mot Bunnag โหมด บุนนาค	Phraya Aphaisongkram; Tat	1849	1922		
39		Linchi ลิ้นจี่	Phra Phipatkosa	1853	2 July 1891		
40		Nuan na Nakhon นวล ณ นคร	Nut na Nakhon, Phraya Senanuchit	1853	22 June 1878		
41		Chan จัน	Phaun	1853	5 December 1877		
42		Mom Luang Thanom Devahastin ถนอม เทพหัสดิน	Mom Rajawongse Chang Devahastin, Phraya Rajbhakdi Sriratana Rajsombatbodi; Mom Khay Devahastin na Ayudhya	1854	28 November 1930		
43		Lamay Suwannathat ละม้าย สุวรรณทัต	Phung Suwannathat, Phraya Anuchitchanchai; Khun Ying Kesorn Suwannathat	1856	19 March 1933		
44		Jaem Krairoek แจ่ม ไกรฤกษ์	Phraya Srisingthep	3 March 1856	28 October 1923		
45		Savang na Nakhon สว่าง ณ นคร	Noi Klang na Nakhon, Chao Phraya Nakhon Si Thammarat; Than Pu Ying Mom Rajawongse Daoreung na Nakhon (née Narindrakula)	30 June 1856	14 June 1942		
46		Pheam Ratnadasniya เพิ่ม รัตนทัศนีย์	Khun Samutsakhorn; Kham	1857	14 April 1951		
47		Chin Bunnag จีน บุนนาค	Phraya Voraphongphipat; Yeam	1857	1927		
48		Nueang Boonyarattaphan เนื่อง บุณยรัตพันธุ์	Yam Boonyarattaphan, Phraya Sriharajridthikrai; Khun Ying Klang Boonyarattaphan	1857	30 March 1922		
49		Pheam na Nakhon เพิ่ม ณ นคร	Klin na Nakhon, Phra Isarathichai	1859	17 July 1916		
50		Charoen เจริญ		1857	9 April 1925		
51		On Bunnag อ้น บุนนาค	Won Bunnag, Chao Phraya Surawongwaiwat; In	1860	1942		Divorce
52		Aem Bisalayabutra เอม พิศลยบุตร	Yim Bisalayabutra, Phraya Phisonsombatboriburn	1862	27 July 1926		
53		Chuang Bisalayabutra ช่วง พิศลยบุตร	Phraya Anuchitchanchai	1863			
54		Yai Boonyarattaphan ใย บุณยรัตพันธุ์	Nuch Boonyarattaphan, Chao Phraya Bhudraphai	1863	10 July 1916		
55		Klep Devahastin na Ayudhya กลีบ เทพหัสดิน ณ อยุธยา	Mom Luang Jiam Devahastin, Phraya Chaisurin	7 March 1864	1926		
56		Linchi Devahastin na Ayudhya ลิ้นจี่ เทพหัสดิน ณ อยุธยา	Mom Luang Jiam Devahastin, Phraya Chaisurin; Mom Tap Devahastin na Ayudhya		21 January 1894		
57		Phakleuang Devahastin na Ayudhya ฟักเหลือง เทพหัสดิน ณ อยุธยา	Mom Luang Jiam Devahastin, Phraya Chaisurin; Mom Tap Devahastin na Ayudhya	1867	27 December 1905		
58		Prakong Amatyakul ประคอง อมาตยกุล	Tat Amatyakul, Phraya Dhamasarnniti Phiphitbhakdi; Khun Ying Im Amatyakul	1865	September 1951		
59		Sangvan Amatyakul สังวาลย์ อมาตยกุล	Phraya Krasapanakitkoson	1867	1933		Divorce
60		Ob Bunnag อบ บุนนาค	Phraya Praphakornvong Voravutphakdi; Prem	1866	8 May 1887		
61		Mom Rajawongse Paen Malakul แป้น มาลากุล	Khajora Charasvong, Prince Prapporapak; Mom Pheam Malakul na Ayudhya	1868	3 November 1918		
62		Perm Sucharitakul เพิ่ม สุจริตกุล	Phraya Rajphakdi	18 July 1869	19 April 1934		
63		Phis Bunnag พิศว์ บุนนาค	Porn Bunnag, Chao Phraya Phasakoravong; Than Pu Ying Plian Bunnag (née Chuto)	21 April 1870	9 May 1965		
64		Thanom Pattaranavik ถนอม ภัทรนาวิก	Bunheang Pattaranavik	1871	19 December 1916		
65		Thapthim ทับทิม		1871	8 October 1919		
66		Yeuan เยื้อน		1871	28 December 1921		
67		Im อิ่ม		1872	22 March 1933		
68		Cheua เชื้อ		1872	22 July 1931		
69		Iam Bunnag เอี่ยม บุนนาค	Thet Bunnag, Chao Phraya Suraphanphisut; Than Pu Ying Au Bunnag (née Wongsaroj)	12 May 1873	22 March 1952	miscarriage; miscarriage	
70		Mom Rajawongse Chiad Ladavalya เฉียด ลดาวัลย์	Prince Chay Ladavalya; Mom Chim Ladavalya na Ayudhya	30 October 1873	30 June 1958		
71		Mom Rajawongse Pam Malakul ปั้ม มาลากุล	Khajora Charasvong, Prince Prapporapak; Mom Thap Malakul na Ayudhya	1874	1938		
72		Konkaew Buranasiri ก้อนแก้ว บุรณศิริ	Charoen Buranasiri, Phraya Thanmajarayanukulmontri	1875	23 May 1893		
73		Cheng แฉ่ง		1875	18 January 1930		
74		Thanom Banjongjaren ถนอม บรรจงเจริญ	Sa-nguan Banjongjaren	4 August 1875	3 July 1972		
75		Mom Rajawongse Kho Snidvongs ข้อ สนิทวงศ์	Prince Svasti Snidvongs; Mom Khian Snidvongs na Ayudha	1867	21 July 1932		
76		Nom Jotikasthira น้อม โชติกเสถียร	Thongdee Jotikasthira, Phraya Thanmajanya Nukulmontri; Khun Ying Lukchan Jotikasthira	17 September 1877	14 January 1966		
77		Jean Jotikasthira เจียน โชติกเสถียร	Koy Jotikasthira				
78		Yeam Jotikasthira เยี่ยม โชติกเถียร	Chu Jotikasthira, Chamuen Smerjairaj	1873	25 October 1890		
79		Kimrian Jotikasthira กิมเหรียญ โชติกเสถียร	Tian Jotikasthira, Phraya Jorukraja Setti				
80		Paem Malakul แป้ม มาลากุล	Khajora Charasvong, Prince Prapporapak; Mom Jab Malakul na Ayudhya	17 May 1876	12 December 1959		
81		Chuang ช่วง		1877	29 January 1921		
82		Ope Bunnag เอิบ บุนนาค	Thet Bunnag, Chao Phraya Suraphanphisut; Than Pu Ying Au Bunnag (née Wongsaroj)	22 April 1879	11 August 1944		
83		Mom Rajawongse Paew Malakul แป้ว มาลากุล	Khajora Charasvong, Prince Prapporapak; Mom Thab Malakul na Ayudhya	1880	10 October 1914		
84		Leam Bunnag เลียม บุนนาค	To Bunnag, Chao Phraya Surawong Vattanasak; Than Pu Ying Lak Bunnag (née Osatananda)	10 August 1881	10 June 1960		
85		Ap Bunnag อาบ บุนนาค	Thet Bunnag, Chao Phraya Suraphanphisut; Than Pu Ying Au Bunnag (née Wongsaroj)	20 February 1881	22 November 1961		
86		Uean Bunnag เอื้อน บุนนาค	Thet Bunnag, Chao Phraya Suraphanphisut; Than Pu Ying Au Bunnag (née Wongsaroj)	1887	11 May 1927		
87		Sae Bunnag แส บุนนาค	Thet Bunnag, Chao Phraya Suraphanphisut; Shab	15 February 1892	7 October 1978		
88		Sombun Manprasoet เฉียด ลดาวัลย์	Chao Shui Manprasoet; Bunma	18 May 1877	7 October 1958		
89		Mom Rajawongse Sadab Ladavalya สดับ ลดาวัลย์	Prince Phem Ladavalya; Mom Choi Ladavalya na Ayudhya (née Nakaranon)	6 March 1890	3 June 1983		
90		Mom Rajawongse Lamai Singhara ละม้าย สิงหรา	Prince Birabongse Singhara	1891	1960		
91		Theam Bunnag แถม บุนนาค	Phra Sadjabhirom; In	3 February 1891	1 August 1950		
92		Aum Gurukura อ่ำ คุรุกุล	Phra Maha Rajakruphiti		4 December 1898		
93		Kimneaw กิมเนียว			2 January 1896		
94		Klin กลิ่น					
95		Keaw Bunnag แก้ว บุนนาค	Thet Bunnag, Chao Phraya Suraphanphisut; Phuang				
96		Ngen Sinsuk เงิน สินสุข					
97		Ngek เง็ก					
98		Mom Rajawongse Jaruai Pramoj จรวย ปราโมช	Prince Jamrun Pramoj; Mom Yean Pramoj na Ayudhya	7 April 1886	29 July 1968		
99		Chan จัน					
100		Jiew จิ๋ว					
101		Chem เจิม	Phraya Visetsaja Thada			miscarriage	
102		Chem เจิม	Phraya Sujarit Raksa				
103		Chem Sribenya เจิม ศรีเพ็ญ	Phraya Maha Ummatayadhibodi				
104		Cheam เจียม					
105		Chamren จำเริญ	Phraya Pricha Chipboriban				
106		Chamren Jotikasavasi จำเริญ โชติกสวัสดิ์	Phraya Jorukraja Setti				
107		Chamren Suwannathat จำเริญ สุวรรณทัต	Phraya Anuchit Chanchai				
108		Cheng Phonkanit แฉ่ง พลกนิษฐ์	Phra Indradej				
109		Choei Bunnag เชย บุนนาค	Chai Bunnag, Phraya Praphakornvong Voravutphakdi				Divorce
110		Chuea Phonkanit เชื้อ พลกนิษฐ์	Sangwan Phonkanit, Phra Indradej				
111		Thanom Saeng-chuto ถนอม แสง-ชูโต	Saeng Saeng-chuto, Phraya Surasakmontri				
112		Thipmontha ทิพมณฑา					
113		Thip Palakavangsa na Ayudhya ทิพย์ ปาลกะวงศ์ ณ อยุธยา	Mom Luang Phueng Palakavangsa				
114		Thip Sakunasing ทิพย์ ศกุณะสิงห์	Singto Sakunasing, Phraya Phetphichai		1980		
115		Nuem น่วม					
116		Nom นอม					
117		Noi น้อย					
118		Noei เน้ย	Khun Phrom Aksorn				
119		Buye บ๋วย	Phra Phakdi Pattrakorn				
120		Prayong Amatyakul ประยงค์ อมาตยกุล	Chaloem Amatyakul, Phraya Athirak Rajauttayan				
121		Puk Bunnag ปุก บุนนาค	Chao Phraya Sri Phiphat		1975		
122		Pui ปุ้ย					
123		Prem เปรม					
124		Plean na Bangxang เปลี่ยน ณ บางช้าง	Kun na Bangxang, Phraya Mahisorn Rajasamphan				
125		Phad Thantanon ผาด ทันตานนท์	Thai Thantanon, Phraya Phichai				
126		Phlap Pattanavejwong พลับ พัฒนเวชวงศ์	Phraya Prasit Vejjakarn				
127		Phin na Nakhon พิณ ณ นคร	Sem na Nakhon, Phra Sri Suphanpradit				
128		Phiphat พิพัฒน์					
129		Mom Rajawongse Manee Isarankura มณี อิศรางกูร	Prince Sobhon Isarankura				
130		Mon มอญ					
131		Mi Chaturongakul มิ จาตุรงคกุล	Prom Chaturongakul, Nai Sathit Yodsathan				
132		Mekhala เมขลา					
133		Yuean Bunnag เยื้อน บุนนาค	Yam Bunnag, Phraya Woraphong Phiphat; Khun Ying Thongkam Bunnag				
134		Yuean Saeng-chuto เยื้อน แสง-ชูโต	Phraya Surasakmontri; Puan				
135		Lamai Ahmadchula ละม้าย อหะหมัดจุฬา	Phraya Chularajamontri; Khun Ying Phae Ahmadchula		1916		
136		Linchi Charuchinda ลิ้นจี่ จารุจินดา	Phraya Phetphichai				
137		Lukchan Charuchinda ลูกจันทร์ จารุจินดา	Phraya Phetphichai				
138		Lukchan Amasiri ลูกจันทร์ เอมะศิริ	Phraya Samut Songkhram				
139		Won Bunnag วอน บุนนาค	Phraya Woraphong Phiphat; Jeam				
140		Wong วงศ์					
141		Suan Boonyarattaphan สวน บุณยรัตพันธุ์	Phraya Bhudraphai				
142		Savas Salak สวาสดิ์ สาลักษณ์	Phraya Sri Sundorn Vohara				
143		Sawang สว่าง	Luang Maha Monthrean				
144		Sai สาย					
145		Salee Sribenya สาลี่ ศรีเพ็ญ	Phraya Maha Ummatayadhibodi				
146		Sam-ang Boonyarattaphan สำอาง บุณยรัตพันธุ์	Chao Phraya Nakhon Si Thammarat				
147		Sin Sriben สิน ศรีเพ็ญ	Nok Sriben, Phraya Phichai Songkram				
148		Singhara สิงหรา					
149		Suwan na Nakhon สุวรรณ ณ นคร	Phuam na Nakhon, Phraya Kanjana Disthabodi				
150		Lean Bunnag เหลียน บุนนาค	Chao Phraya Surawongwaiwat; Lee				
151		Im Jotikasthira อิม โชติกเสถียร	Phraya Jorukraja Setti				
152		Im Gurukura อิ่ม คุรุกุล	Phra Maha Rajakruphiti				
153		Chan Saeng-chuto จันทร์ แสง-ชูโต	Phraya Surasakmontri; Mom Luang Nuam Saeng-chuto (née Narindrakula)	1878	1940		
154		Mom Rajawongse Pradap Suriyakul ประดับ สุริยกุล	Prince Thapthim Suriyakul				

== List of children ==
No.	Portrait	Name	Mother	Birth	Death	Notes
1		Princess Phongpraphai ผ่องประไพ	Mom Rajawongse Khae Phuengbun	19 December 1867	11 March 1942	
2		Srivilailaksana, Princess of Suphan Buri ศรีวิไลยลักษณ์	Phae Bunnag (later elevated to Chao Khun Phra Prayuravongse)	24 July 1868	26 October 1904	
3		Prince Isarawongse Vorarajkumar อิศรวงศ์วรราชกุมาร	Saeng Kalyanamitra	4 September 1870	5 June 1872	
4		Princess Voralaksanavadi วรลักษณาวดี	Sut Sukumalachandra	12 June 1872	18 August 1926	
5		Unnamed son	Princess Daksinajar	13 June 1872		stillborn
6		Princess Ajrabarni Rajkanya อัจฉรพรรณีราชกัญญา	Talap Ketudat	7 July 1872	15 November 1910	
7		Princess Chudharatana Rajakumari จุฑารัตนราชกุมารี	Morakot Benyakul	17 December 1872	31 May 1930	
8		Chandra Saradavara, Princess of Phichit จันทราสรัทวาร	Princess Piu Ladavalya	15 April 1873	21 February 1904	
9		Princess Orabindu Benyabhak อรพินทุ์เพ็ญภาค	Mom Rajawongse Yoi Isarankura	27 April 1873	26 January 1935	
10		Princess Suvabaktra Vilayabanna สุวพักตร์วิไลยพรรณ	Phae Bunnag (later elevated to Chao Khun Phra Prayuravongse)	2 May 1873	30 July 1930	
11		Yaovamalaya Narumala, Princess of Sawankhalok เยาวมาลย์นฤมล	Princess Bua Ladavalya	4 June 1873	3 July 1909	
12		Kitiyakara Voralaksana, Prince of Chanthaburi กิติยากรวรลักษณ์	Uam Bisalayabutra	8 June 1874	27 November 1931	
13		Prince Nabhanka Nibandhabongs นภางค์นิพัทธพงศ์	Saeng Kalyanamitra	8 August 1874	17 September 1876	
14		Raphi Phatthanasak, Prince of Ratchaburi รพีพัฒนศักดิ์	Talap Ketudat	21 October 1874	7 August 1920	
15		Pravitra Vadhanodom, Prince of Prachinburi ประวิตรวัฒโนดม	Chaem Kalyanamitra	27 May 1875	9 December 1919	
16		miscarriage	Choem	—	1875	unborn
17		Princess Bandhavanna Varobhas บัณฑวรรณวโรภาษ	Phae Bunnag (later elevated to Chao Khun Phra Prayuravongse)	25 November 1875	15 November 1891	
18		Chirapravati Voradej, Prince of Nakhon Chai Si จิรประวัติวรเดช	Thapthim Rojanadis	7 November 1876	4 February 1913	
19		Princess Bhadrayuvadi ภัทรายุวดี	Saeng Kalyanamitra	5 December 1876	30 September 1913	
20		Suddha Dibyaratana, Princess of Rattanakosin สุทธาทิพยรัตน์	Princess Sukhumala Marasri	14 September 1877	2 January 1922	
21		Maha Vajirunhis, Crown Prince of Siam มหาวชิรุณหิศ	Princess Savang Vadhana	27 June 1878	4 January 1894	
22		Princess Kannabhorn Bejaratana กรรณาภรณ์เพ็ชรรัตน์	Princess Sunandha Kumariratana	12 August 1878	31 May 1880	
23		miscarriage	Princess Sukhumala Marasri	—	1878	unborn
24		Bahurada Manimaya, Princess Debnariratana พาหุรัดมณีมัย	Princess Saovabha Phongsri	19 December 1878	27 August 1887	
25		Princess Charoensri Chanamayu เจริญศรีชนมายุ	Saeng Kalyanamitra	31 March 1878	24 December 1916	
26		Unnamed daughter	Bua	13 June 1879		stillborn
27		Prince Isariyalongkorn อิศริยาลงกรณ์	Princess Savang Vadhana	4 September 1879	25 September 1879	
28		Princess Praves Vorasamai ประเวศวรสมัย	Thapthim Rojanadis	2 December 1879	31 May 1944	
29		miscarriage	Princess Saovabha Phongsri	—	13 January 1880	unborn
30		miscarriage	Princess Sunandha Kumariratana	—	31 May 1880	unborn
31		Abhakara Kiartivongse, Prince of Chumphon อาภากรเกียรติวงศ์	Mot Bunnag	19 December 1880	19 May 1923	
32		Vajiravudh, King of Siam มหาวชิราวุธ	Princess Saovabha Phongsri	1 January 1881	26 November 1925	
33		Princess Vichitra Chiraprabha วิจิตรจิรประภา	Princess Savang Vadhana	21 April 1881	15 August 1881	
34		Princess Sasibongse Prabai ศศิพงษ์ประไพ	Chan Sukumalachandra	26 April 1881	31 May 1934	
35		Unnamed daughter	Sai Sukumalachandra	10 June 1881	11 June 1881	
36		Paribatra Sukhumbandhu, Prince of Nakhon Sawan บริพัตรสุขุมพันธ์	Princess Sukhumala Marasri	29 June 1881	18 January 1944	
37		Princess Bismai Bimalasataya พิสมัยพิมลสัตย์	Ruean Sundarasaradula	20 December 1881	6 February 1936	
38		Purachatra Jayakara, Prince of Kamphaeng Phet บุรฉัตรไชยากร	Wat Kalyanamitra	23 January 1881	14 September 1936	
39		Prince Tribejrutama Dhamrong ตรีเพ็ชรุตม์ธำรง	Princess Saovabha Phongsri	8 February 1881	22 November 1887	
40		Sommatiwongse Varodaya, Prince of Nakhon Si Thammarat สมมติวงศ์วโรทัย	Princess Savang Vadhana	16 April 1884	17 June 1899	
41		Benbadhanabongse, Prince of Phichai เพ็ญพัฒนพงศ์	Morakot Benyakul	13 September 1884	11 November 1909	
42		Princess Oraongka Ankayuba อรองค์อรรคยุพา	Mot Bunnag	27 Oct 1882	20 Feb 1883	
43		Chakrabongse Bhuvanath, Hereditary Prince of Siam จักรพงษ์ภูวนาถ	Princess Saovabha Phongsri	3 March 1883	13 June 1920	
44		Yugala Dighambara, Prince of Lopburi ยุคลทิฆัมพร	Princess Sai Ladavalya	17 March 1883	8 April 1932	
45		miscarriage	Princess Saovabha Phongsri	—	1883	unborn
46		miscarriage	Princess Saovabha Phongsri	—	1883	unborn
47		Vudhijaya Chalermlabha, Prince of Sing Buri วุฒิชัยเฉลิมลาภ	Thapthim Rojanadis	5 December 1883	18 October 1947	
48		Valaya Alongkorn, Princess of Phetchaburi วไลยอลงกรณ์	Princess Savang Vadhana	16 April 1884	15 February 1938	
49		Dilok Nobaratana, Prince of Sankhaburi ดิลกนพรัตน์	Chao Thipkeson na Chiangmai	3 May 1884	12 January 1912	
50		Princess Nabhachara Chamrassri นภาจรจำรัสศรี	Princess Sai Ladavalya	16 April 1884	15 February 1938	
51		Suriyong Prayurabandhu, Prince of Chaiya สุริยงประยูรพันธุ์	Mot Bunnag	27 July 1884	2 May 1919	
52		Princess Yaovabha Bongsanid เยาวภาพงศ์สนิท	Mom Rajawongse Nueang Snidvongs	28 Aug 1884	13 June 1934	
53		miscarriage	Princess Saovabha Phongsri	—	1884	unborn
54		Princess Oraprabandh Rambai อรประพันธ์รำไพ	On Bunnag	7 July 1885	25 May 1933	
55		Malini Nobhadara, Princess of Si Satchanalai มาลินีนพดารา	Princess Sai Ladavalya	31 July 1885	22 December 1924	
56		Princess Prabha Bannabilaya ประภาพรรณพิไลย	Phrom	13 August 1885	8 September 1948	
57		Princess Prabai Bannabilas ประไพพรรณพิลาศ	Phrom	13 August 1885	17 September 1886	
58		Rangsit Prayurasakdi, Prince of Chai Nat รังสิตประยูรศักดิ์	Mom Rajawongse Nueang Snidvongs	12 November 1885	7 March 1951	
59		Prince Siriraj Kakudhabhand ศิริราชกกุธภัณฑ์	Princess Saovabha Phongsri	27 November 1885	3 May 1887	
60		Nibha Nobhadol, Princess of U Thong นิภานภดล	Princess Sai Ladavalya	4 December 1886	29 January 1935	
61		miscarriage	Princess Saovabha Phongsri	—	1886	unborn
62		Princess Komala Saovamala โกมลเสาวมาลย์	Wong Netrayana	19 September 1887	19 April 1890	
63		miscarriage	On Bunnag	—	1887	unborn
64		Unnamed daughter	Princess Saovabha Phongsri	13 December 1887		stillborn
65		Princess Sirabhorn Sobhon ศิราภรณ์โสภณ	Princess Savang Vadhana	19 July 1888	24 May 1898	
66		Prince Khajera Chirapradidha เขจรจิรประดิษฐ	Sae Rojanadis	23 July 1888	7 October 1888	
67		Prince Samaya Vudhirodom สมัยวุฒิวโรดม	Phrom	13 September 1888	9 December 1889	
68		Prince Isariyabhorn อิศริยาภรณ์	Mom Rajawongse Keson Snidvongs	21 October 1888	21 September 1892	
69		miscarriage	Princess Savang Vadhana	—	1888	unborn
70		Princess Adorn Dibyanibha อาทรทิพยนิภา	Chum Krairoek	21 April 1889	23 March 1958	
71		miscarriage	Princess Sai Ladavalya	—	1889	unborn
72		Asdang Dejavudh, Hereditary Prince of Siam อัษฎางค์เดชาวุธ	Princess Saovabha Phongsri	12 May 1889	9 February 1924	
73		Princess Vimolnaka Nabisi วิมลนาคนพีสี	Princess Dara Rasmi of Chiangmai	2 October 1889	21 February 1892	
74		Princess Abbhantripaja อัพภันตรีปชา	Sae Rojanadis	31 October 1889	18 February 1934	
75		Princess Adisaya Suriyabha อดิสัยสุริยาภา	On Bunnag	14 February 1889	27 January 1963	
76		miscarriage	Phrom	—	1889	unborn
77		miscarriage	Princess Saovabha Phongsri	—	1889	unborn
78		miscarriage	Phrom	—	1890	unborn
79		miscarriage	Mom Rajawongse Keson Snidvongs	—	1890	unborn
80		miscarriage	Princess Savang Vadhana	—	1890	unborn
81		miscarriage	Princess Saovabha Phongsri	—	1890	unborn
82		Princess Dibyalangkarn ทิพยาลังการ	Sae Rojanadis	17 January 1891	4 June 1932	
83		Princess Suchitra Bharani สุจิตราภรณี	Chum Krairoek	6 February 1890	26 October 1918	
84		Princess Vapi Busbakara วาปีบุษบากร	Phrom	25 June 1891	15 December 1982	
85		miscarriage	Iam Bunnag	—	1891	unborn
86		Mahidol Adulyadej, Prince Father of Thailand มหิดลอดุลเดช	Princess Savang Vadhana	1 January 1892	24 September 1929	
87		miscarriage	Hem Amatyakul	—	1891	unborn
88		Prince Anusara Siriprasadh อนุสรสิริประสาธน์	Mom Rajawongse Keson Snidvongs	21 February 1892	6 May 1900	
89		Princess Lavad Voraong ลวาดวรองค์	Luean Niyavananda	30 March 1892	5 December 1893	
90		Chudadhuj Dharadilok, Prince of Phetchabun จุฑาธุชธราดิลก	Princess Saovabha Phongsri	5 July 1892	8 July 1923	
91		miscarriage	Iam Bunnag	—	1892	
92		miscarriage	On Bunnag	—	1892	
93		Unnamed daughter	Mom Rajawongse Chiu Kapitatha	13 December 1892	25 January 1893	
94		Princess Hemvadi เหมวดี	Hem Amatyakul	12 January 1892	17 October 1972	
95		Prince Urubongs Rajsombhoj อุรุพงศ์รัชสมโภช	Luean Niyavananda	15 October 1893	20 September 1909	
96		Prajadhipok, King of Siam ประชาธิปกศักดิเดชน์	Princess Saovabha Phongsri	8 November 1893	30 May 1941	
97		Unnamed daughter	Princess Savang Vadhana	9 November 1893	12 November 1893	

== See also ==
- List of children of Mongkut
