= Pattaratorn Chirapravati =

Thai art historian (born 1958)

Mom Luang Pattaratorn Chirapravati (Thai: ม.ล.ภัทธราธร จิรประวัติ RTGS: Pattaratorn Chirapravati; born 1958) is a Thai art historian specialising in Southeast Asian visual cultures and Buddhist art. She is a professor emerita of Asian Art History and Curatorial Studies at California State University, Sacramento.

== Background and Education ==
Pattaratorn belongs to a cadet branch of the Thai royal family, descending from Prince Chirapravati Voradej. She studied Asian art history at Silpakorn University (B.A. first class honor 1981) and Indian art history at Ohio State University (M.A. 1984). She later continued her education at Cornell University, completing an M.A. (1991) and Ph.D. in Southeast Asian Art History and Southeast Asian Studies (1994). The topic of her dissertation was "The cult of votive tablets in Thailand (sixth to thirteenth centuries)".

== Academic career ==
During her early career Pattaratorn taught as an instructor at Silpakorn University (1990–92) and University of Tsukuba (1992–94). From 1997 to 2002 she was assistant curator of Southeast Asian Art at the Asian Art Museum of San Francisco, where she also taught in the Art Department of Sonoma State University.

In 2002 Pattaratorn was appointed assistant professor in the Art Department of California State University, Sacramento. After being promoted to associate professor in 2007, she served as director of Sacramento State's Asian Studies Program until 2014 and then as its vice director. In Fall 2013 she became a full professor in the Art Department of Sacramento State. In 2016 she served a visiting professor and head of Arts and Humanities at Yale-NUS College, Singapore. After retiring from California State University in 2022, she became a visiting professor at the Nanyang Technological University.

In addition to her teaching and research activities, Pattaratorn has curated a number of art exhibitions, including at the Asian Art Museum (San Francisco) and in the Southeast Asia Department of The Metropolitan Museum of Art in New York City.

== Selected publications ==
- Votive tablets in Thailand: origin, styles, and uses. Oxford University Press. 1997.
- "Buddhism and Thai Art". Religion Compass. 3 (4): 566–579. 2009. doi:10.1111/j.1749-8171.2009.00148.x.
- "From Text to Image: Copying as Buddhist Practice in Late Fourteenth-Century Sukhothai". In Steve Berkwitz; et al. (eds.). Buddhist Manuscript Cultures. Routledge. 2009. pp. 172–188.
- Divination au royaume de Siam: le corps, la guerre, le destin. Manuscrit siamois du XIXe siècle. PUF. 2011. Co-edited with Nicolas Revire.
