= Charoensri Chanamayu =

Princess of Siam

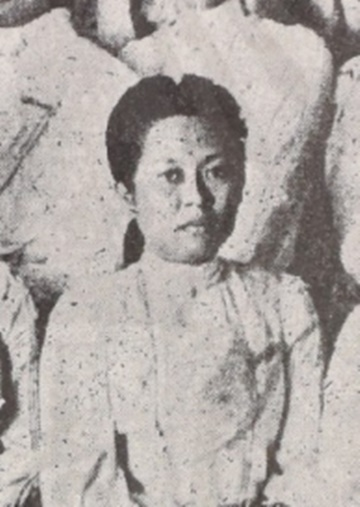
- Born: 31 March 1878; Grand Palace; Bangkok, Siam
- Died: 24 December 1916 (aged 38); Bangkok, Siam
Names
- Charoensri Chanamayu
- House: Chakri Dynasty
- Father: Chulalongkorn (Rama V)
- Mother: Chao Chom Manda Saeng Galyanamitra
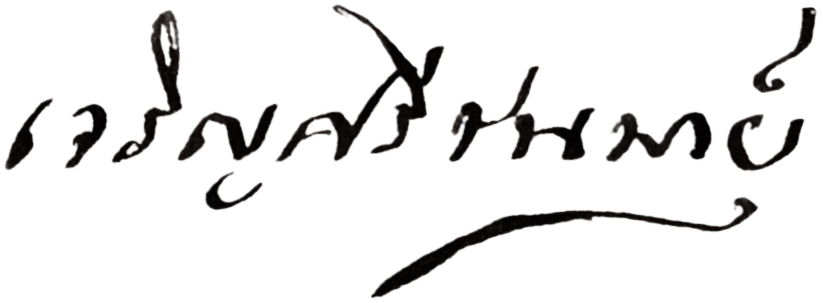
- Signature

Princess Charoensri Chanamayu or Phra Chao Boromwongse Ther Phra Ong Chao Charoensri Chanamayu (RTGS: Charoensi Chonmayu) (Thai: พระเจ้าบรมวงศ์เธอ พระองค์เจ้าเจริญศรีชนมายุ) (31 March 1878 – 24 December 1916) was a Princess of Siam (later Thailand). She was a member of the Siamese Royal Family. She was the daughter of Chulalongkorn, King Rama V of Siam.

Her mother was The Noble Consort (Chao Chom Manda) Saeng Galyanamitra (daughter of Phraya Jayavichit, granddaughter of Chao Phraya Nikara Bodindra (Toh) who built Galyanamitra Temple). Princess Charoensri Chanamayu had 3 full siblings; 2 elder brothers and 1 elder sister;

- Prince Isaravongs Vorarajakumara (4 September 1870 – 5 June 1872)
- Prince Nabhanka Nibandhabongs (8 August 1874 – 17 September 1876)
- Princess Beatrice Bhadrayuvadi (5 December 1876 – 30 September 1913)

Princess Charoensri Chanamayu died 24 December 1916, aged 38.

== Ancestry ==
Ancestor of Princess Charoensri Chanamayu
Princess Charoensri Chanamayu	Father: Chulalongkorn, King Rama V of Siam	Paternal Grandfather: Mongkut, King Rama IV of Siam	Paternal Great-grandfather: Buddha Loetla Nabhalai, King Rama II of Siam
Princess Charoensri Chanamayu	Father: Chulalongkorn, King Rama V of Siam	Paternal Grandfather: Mongkut, King Rama IV of Siam	Paternal Great-grandmother: Queen Sri Suriyendra
Princess Charoensri Chanamayu	Father: Chulalongkorn, King Rama V of Siam	Paternal Grandmother: Queen Debsirindra	Paternal Great-grandfather: Prince Sirivongse, the Prince Matayabidaksa
Princess Charoensri Chanamayu	Father: Chulalongkorn, King Rama V of Siam	Paternal Grandmother: Queen Debsirindra	Paternal Great-grandmother: Mom Noi Sirivongs na Ayudhya
Princess Charoensri Chanamayu	Mother: Chao Chom Manda Saeng Galyanamitra	Maternal Grandfather: Phraya Jayavichit	Maternal Great-grandfather: Chao Phraya Nikara Bodindra
Princess Charoensri Chanamayu	Mother: Chao Chom Manda Saeng Galyanamitra	Maternal Grandfather: Phraya Jayavichit	Maternal Great-grandmother: unknown
Princess Charoensri Chanamayu	Mother: Chao Chom Manda Saeng Galyanamitra	Maternal Grandmother: unknown	Maternal Great-grandfather: unknown
Princess Charoensri Chanamayu	Mother: Chao Chom Manda Saeng Galyanamitra	Maternal Grandmother: unknown	Maternal Great-grandmother: unknown
