= Chirapravati Voradej =

Chirapravati Voradej จิรประวัติวรเดช
- Prince of Nakhon Chaisi
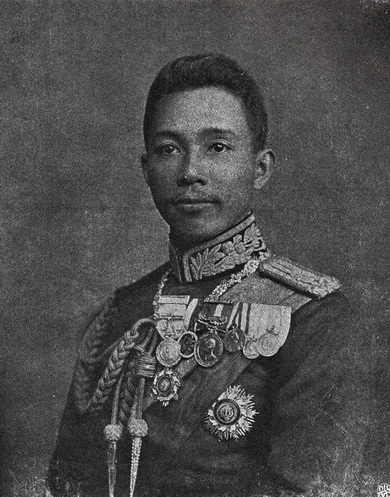
- HRH Prince of Nakhon Chaisi

Minister of Defence
- In office: 11 December 1910 - 4 February 1913
- Appointed: King Vajiravudh
- Predecessor: Bhanurangsi Savangwongse
- Successor: Arun Chatrakul

Chief of the Joint Operations Department
- In office: 8 August 1901 - 11 December 1910
- Appointed: King Chulalongkorn
- Predecessor: Narisara Nuwattiwong
- Successor: title merged
- Born: 11 July 1876; Bangkok, Siam
- Died: 2 April 1913 (aged 36); Bangkok, Siam
- Spouse: Mom Chao Pravas Svasti Sonakul; Mom Chao Sumornmalya Sonakul
- Issue: 5 Children See list: Mom Chao Vimala Badamaraj Chirapravati Mom Chao Nivas Svasti Chirapravati Mom Chao Prasobsri Chirapravati Mom Chao Nidasanadhorn Chirapravati Mom Chao Khachorn Chirabandha Chirapravati
- House: Chirapravati family (Chakri Dynasty)
- Father: Chulalongkorn (Rama V)
- Mother: Thapthim Rochanatisha
- Military career
- Branch: (Thailand) Royal Siamese Army
- Rank: Field Marshal

Field Marshal Prince Chirapravati Voradej, Prince of Nakhon Chaisi (Thai: พระเจ้าบรมวงศ์เธอ พระองค์เจ้าจิรประวัติวรเดช กรมหลวงนครไชยศรีสุรเดช) was a prince of the Chakri Dynasty and influential military officer of Siam. The prince was a son of King Chulalongkorn (Rama V) and Chao Chom Manda Thapthim Rochanatisha. He was the king's 17th child.

The prince was part of the first group of the king's sons sent to Europe to study, spending time there from 1885 - 1896. After his return to Siam, he served as the Commander of the Department of Military Operation (Commander of the Army) and Minister of Defence under his father and his brother, King Vajiravudh (Rama VI). Because of his important and modernising reforms of the Royal Siamese Army, he is now considered the 'Father of the Thai Army'. His descendants use the surname Chirapravati (จิรประวัติ ณ อยุธยา).

== Birth ==
Prince Chirapravati Voradej was born on 7 November 1876 at the Grand Palace in Bangkok. The 17th child of King Chulalongkorn and Chao Chom Manda (consort mother) Thapthim Rochanatisha. The king and Thapthim would have two more children: Princess Praves Vorasamai (1879-1944) and Prince Vudhijaya Chalermlabha (1883-1947). He was given the title of Phra Ong Chao upon birth, which signified his birth as a son of a king and a commoner mother.

== Education ==
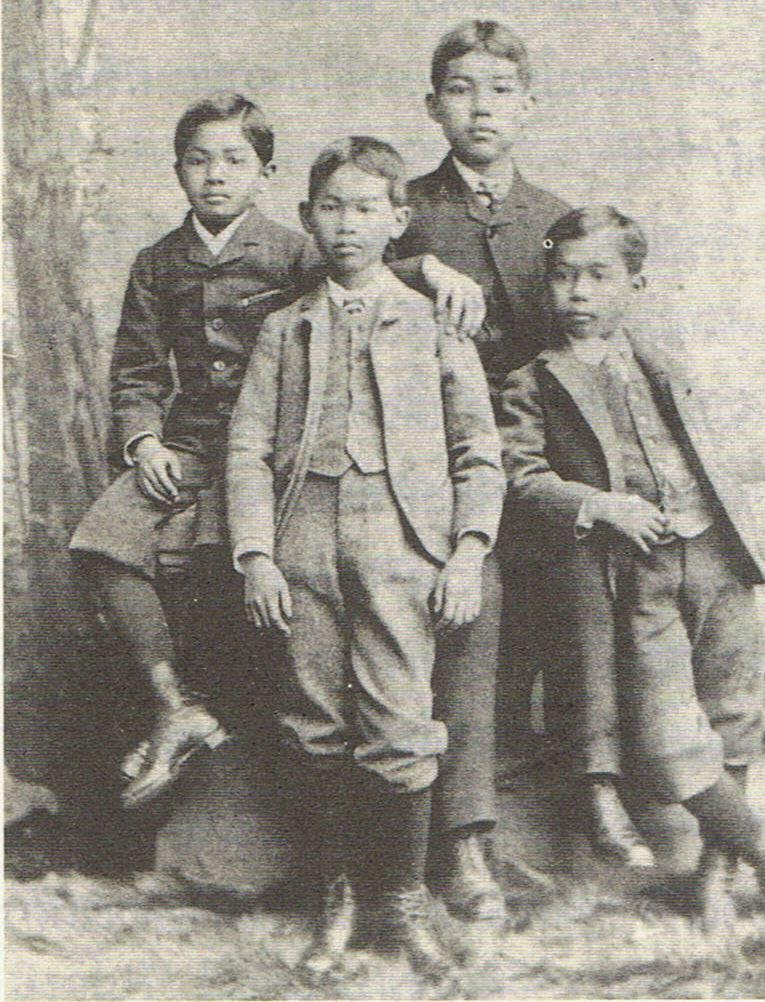
Four princes (left to right): Raphi Phatthanasak, Pravitra Vadhanodom, Kitiyakara Voralaksana and Chirapravati Voradej.

The prince's education began in the palace's inner court. Once he was older he was educated at the royal pages school, Suankularb Wittayalai School. In 1885 the prince together with three elder brothers (the king's four eldest), Princes Kitiyakara Voralaksana, Raphi Phatthanasak, and Pravitra Vadhanodom were sent to the United Kingdom for further study. The four princes were the first of the king's many sons to be sent abroad for study. Crown Prince Maha Vajirunhis wrote in his diary on the 30 June 1885:

"In the morning, after breakfast, His Majesty went to the Chakri Maha Prasat Throne Hall. He tied sacred strings around the four elder brothers, poured holy water on them and fingered powders on their forehead. The King then lead the princes to Prince Pavares to tie sacred strings. Pra Chaiya Watana, the Holy Monk, tied holy strings around their neck. They all then went down to the Pae Villa, by the Chao Phraya river. His Majesty gave them blessings, and wished that they leave [Siam] with happiness in their hearts, and remember his teachings. The King invited the female members of the royal family to also be present, that the princes may say goodbye to their mothers. Only Mae Uam, mother of Prince Kitiyakara wasn't there. At about 9am, the King went down to the ship, Soponpakavadi, to see the princes off. He hugged and kissed all of his four eldest sons. He stood there until the ship was out of sight, and then came back up to the palace. There were many elder royals who went on the ship with the four princes to the UK. There were also many royals and aristocrats who came to the Pae Villa to see them off, including Mother and Aunt."

A military study focus was selected for the prince and in 1891 he went to Denmark to study at the Royal Danish Military Academy. He was commissioned as a cadet and then promoted to the rank of second lieutenant. He graduated from thelis academy in 1894. After further study in the artillery corps he was able to serve in the Royal Danish Army from 1896.

== Work in the army ==
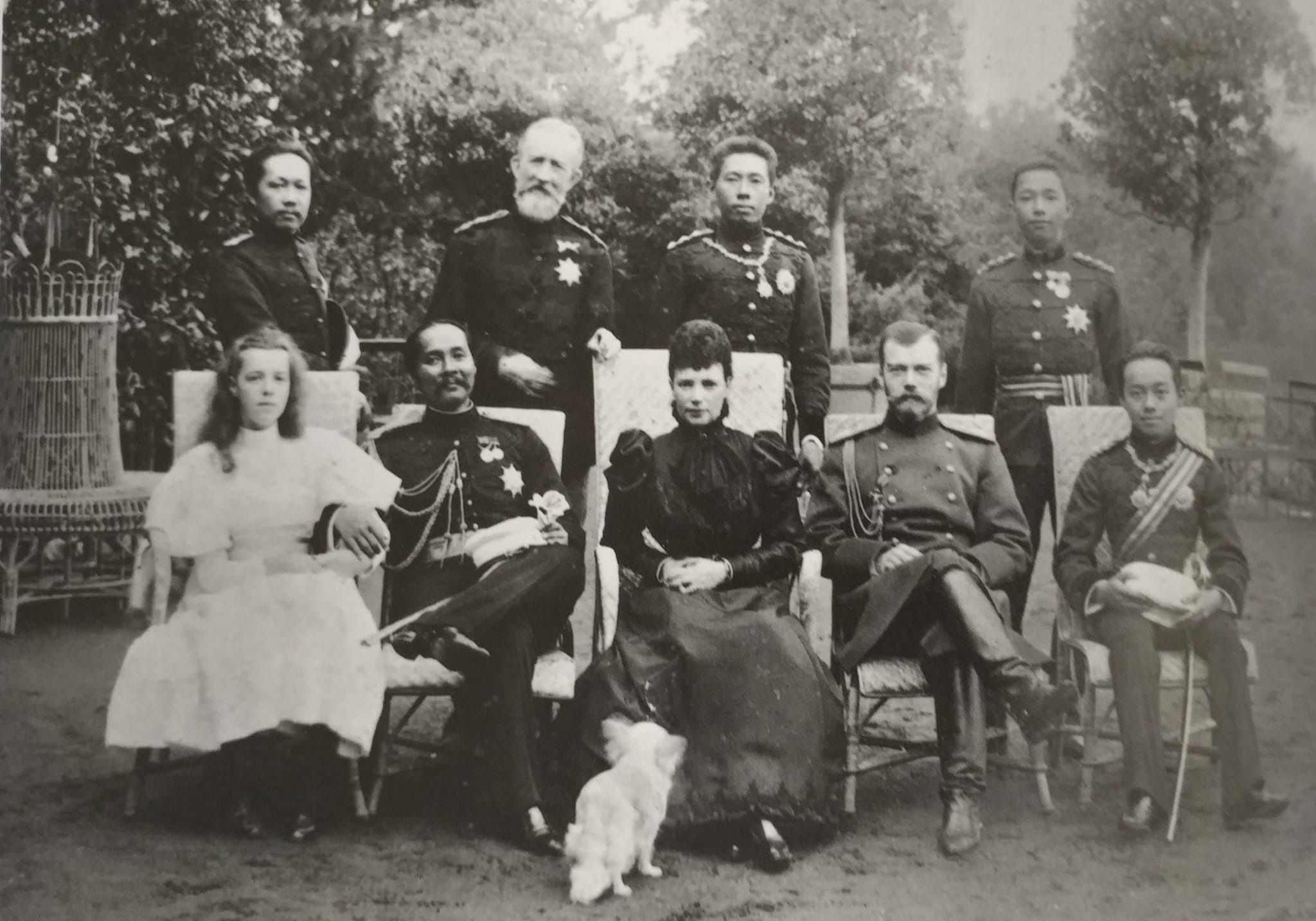
King Chulalongkorn's visit to Europe in 1897, the King is with Tsar Nicholas II, Dowager Empress Maria Feodorovna, Crown Prince Maha Vajiravudh, Grand Duchess Olga Alexandrovna. Prince Chirapravati Voradej is back right.

After his return to Siam, the prince advised King Chulalongkorn on the creation of a permanent general staff for the Royal Siamese Army. As a result, he was appointed its first chief of staff in 1898. In the same year his father also made him a Privy Councillor. In 1899 he was given the additional role of Secretary of the Army and Commander of the Regiment of the King's Own Bodyguard.

In 1901, at the age of 24 he was appointed Commander of the Department of Military Operation, equivalent to the Commander of the Army. In 1903 the prince was instrumental in the effort to reform the army by creating a system of regional conscription and training. In 1905 the prince introduced the western concepts of organising the army into regiments, divisions and army corps. He began by creating ten infantry divisions and founding many new regiments.

After the death of his father in 1910, he was appointed by the new king, his younger brother, Vajiravudh as the Minister of Defence. In 1911 he was promoted to the rank of Field marshal (the highest rank in the army), the second such appointment in Siam. As minister, in 1912 the prince approved the sending of three trainee air pilots to train in France, presaging the foundation of the Royal Thai Air Force. The prince suffered from many illnesses and spent much of the last year of his life recuperating in Europe. The prince died in office on 4 February 1913, at the age of only 36.

== Family ==
The prince married twice. His wives were sisters, although they were married sequentially, non-polygamously. Firstly on 12 August 1898 to Mom Chao Pravas Svasti Sonakul (25 December 1883 - 11 December 1902). They had two daughters and one son.

- Mom Chao Vimala Badamaraj Chirapravati (17 May 1899 - 3 February 1965)
- Mom Chao Nivas Svasti Chirapravati (16 July 1900 - 28 March 1976)
- Mom Chao Prasobsri Chirapravati (8 November 1901 - 19 November 1940)

Following the death of his wife, on 28 April 1904 he was married to Mom Chao Sumornmalya Sonakul (14 April 1888 - 22 February 1940), They had two sons.

- Mom Chao Nidasanadhorn Chirapravati (9 January 1906 - 3 March 1963)
- Mom Chao Khachorn Chirabandha Chirapravati (19 October 1912 - 15 August 1971)

== Titles and decorations ==
=== Titles ===
- 1876: His Royal Highness Prince Chirapravati Voradej
- 1900: His Royal Highness Prince Chirapravati Voradej, Prince of Nakhon Chaisi
- 1903: His Royal Highness Lieutenant General Prince Chirapravati Voradej, Prince of Nakhon Chaisi
- 1906: His Royal Highness General Prince Chirapravati Voradej, Prince of Nakhon Chaisi
- 1911: His Royal Highness Field Marshal Prince Chirapravati Voradej, Prince of Nakhon Chaisi

=== Decorations ===
Siamese Royal Orders

- Knight of the Order of the Royal House of Chakri (1897)
- Knight of the Order of the Nine Gems (1911)
- Knight Grand Cordon of the Order of Chula Chom Klao (1900)
- Knight Grand Cross of the Order of the White Elephant (1901)
- Knight Grand Cross of the Order of the Crown of Thailand (1900)
- Dushdi Mala Medal Pin of Arts and Science (Military) (1897)
- Chakra Mala Medal (1909)
- King Rama V Royal Cypher Medal, 2nd Class (1901)
- King Rama VI Royal Cypher Medal, 1st Class (1910)

Foreign Orders

- Grand Cordon of the Order of the Paulownia Flowers (Empire of Japan) (1891)
- Knight of the Order of the Dannebrog (Kingdom of Denmark) (1898)
- Knight 1st Class of the Order of the Red Eagle (Kingdom of Prussia)
- Knight 1st Class of the Imperial Order of Saint Alexander Nevsky (Russian Empire)

== Ancestry ==
Ancestor of Chirapravati Voradej
Prince Chirapravati Voradej	Father: Chulalongkorn, King Rama V of Siam	Paternal Grandfather: Mongkut, King Rama IV of Siam	Paternal Great-grandfather: Buddha Loetla Nabhalai, King Rama II of Siam
Prince Chirapravati Voradej	Father: Chulalongkorn, King Rama V of Siam	Paternal Grandfather: Mongkut, King Rama IV of Siam	Paternal Great-grandmother: Queen Sri Suriyendra
Prince Chirapravati Voradej	Father: Chulalongkorn, King Rama V of Siam	Paternal Grandmother: Queen Debsirindra	Paternal Great-grandfather: Prince Sirivongse, the Prince Matayabidaksa
Prince Chirapravati Voradej	Father: Chulalongkorn, King Rama V of Siam	Paternal Grandmother: Queen Debsirindra	Paternal Great-grandmother: Mom Noi Sirivongs na Ayudhya
Prince Chirapravati Voradej	Mother: Chao Chom Manda Tabtim Rojanadis	Maternal Grandfather: Phraya Abbhantrikamas	Maternal Great-grandfather: unknown
Prince Chirapravati Voradej	Mother: Chao Chom Manda Tabtim Rojanadis	Maternal Grandfather: Phraya Abbhantrikamas	Maternal Great-grandmother: unknown
Prince Chirapravati Voradej	Mother: Chao Chom Manda Tabtim Rojanadis	Maternal Grandmother: Bang Rojanadis	Maternal Great-grandfather: unknown
Prince Chirapravati Voradej	Mother: Chao Chom Manda Tabtim Rojanadis	Maternal Grandmother: Bang Rojanadis	Maternal Great-grandmother: unknown

== See also ==
- List of children of Chulalongkorn
- Royal Thai Army
- 1st Division (Thailand)
- 1st Infantry Regiment (Thailand)

Chirapravati Voradej, Prince of Nakhon Chaisi House of Chirapravati Cadet branch of the House of Chakri Born: 11 July 1876 Died: 2 April 1913
Political offices
Preceded by Bhanubandhu Vongsevoradej	Minister of Defence; 1910 – 1913	Succeeded by Bodindechanuchit
Military offices
Preceded by Narisara Nuwattiwong	Chief of the Joint Operations Department; 1899 – 1910	Succeeded by Himself as Minister of War
Preceded by Himself as Chief of the Joint Operations Department	Minister of War; 1910 – 1913	Succeeded by Bodindechanuchit
