= Beatrice Bhadrayuvadi =

Thai princess (1876–1913)

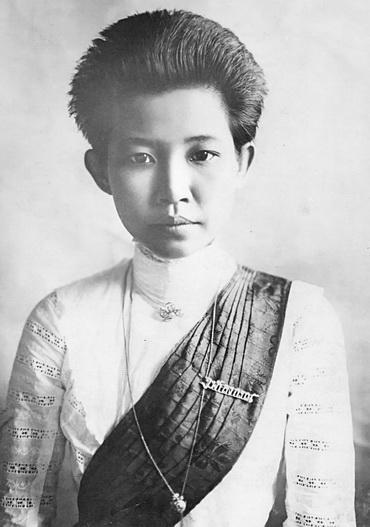
- Born: 5 December 1876; Grand Palace; Bangkok, Siam
- Died: 30 September 1913 (aged 36); Bangkok, Siam
- Her Royal Highness; Princess Beatrice Bhadrayuvadi
- House: Chakri Dynasty
- Father: Chulalongkorn (Rama V)
- Mother: Saeng Kalyanamit

Princess Beatrice Bhadrayuvadi (Thai: บีเอตริศภัทรายุวดี; RTGS: Bi-e-trit Phatthrayuwadi; 5 December 1876 – 30 September 1913), was a Princess of Siam (later Thailand). She was a member of Siamese Royal Family and a daughter of Chulalongkorn, also known as Rama V.

== Early life and family ==
Her name was given by her father, King Chulalongkorn, in honour of British Queen Victoria's daughter, The Princess Beatrice. Her mother was The Noble Consort (Chao Chom Manda) Saeng Kalyanamitra (daughter of Phraya Jayavichit, son of Chao Phraya Nikara Bodindra (To) who built Kalyanamitra Temple. Princess Beatrice Bhadrayuvadi had 3 full siblings; 2 elder brothers and 1 younger sister;

- Prince Isaravongs Vorarajakumara (4 September 1870 – 5 June 1872)
- Prince Nabhanka Nibandhabongs (8 August 1874 – 17 September 1876)
- Princess Charoensri Chanamayu (31 March 1878 – 24 December 1916)

== Spiritual practice ==
Princess Beatrice listened to Dhamma sermons and wrote down what she remembered so that others could learn from her notes.

== Death ==
Princess Beatrice Bhadrayuvadi died 30 September 1913, aged 36.

== Honours ==
- Dame Grand Commander (Second Class, lower grade) of the Most Illustrious Order of Chula Chom Klao (1899)
- King Rama V Royal Cypher Medal, 2nd Class (1908)
- King Rama VI Royal Cypher Medal, 2nd Class (1912)

== Ancestry ==
Ancestor of Princess Beatrice Bhadrayuvadi
Princess Beatrice Bhadrayuvadi	Father: Chulalongkorn, King Rama V of Siam	Paternal Grandfather: Mongkut, King Rama IV of Siam	Paternal Great-grandfather: Buddha Loetla Nabhalai, King Rama II of Siam
Princess Beatrice Bhadrayuvadi	Father: Chulalongkorn, King Rama V of Siam	Paternal Grandfather: Mongkut, King Rama IV of Siam	Paternal Great-grandmother: Queen Sri Suriyendra
Princess Beatrice Bhadrayuvadi	Father: Chulalongkorn, King Rama V of Siam	Paternal Grandmother: Queen Debsirindra	Paternal Great-grandfather: Prince Sirivongse, the Prince Matayabidaksa
Princess Beatrice Bhadrayuvadi	Father: Chulalongkorn, King Rama V of Siam	Paternal Grandmother: Queen Debsirindra	Paternal Great-grandmother: Mom Noi Sirivongs na Ayudhya
Princess Beatrice Bhadrayuvadi	Mother: Chao Chom Manda Saeng Kalyanamitra	Maternal Grandfather: Phraya Jayavichit	Maternal Great-grandfather: Chao Phraya Nikara Bodindra
Princess Beatrice Bhadrayuvadi	Mother: Chao Chom Manda Saeng Kalyanamitra	Maternal Grandfather: Phraya Jayavichit	Maternal Great-grandmother: unknown
Princess Beatrice Bhadrayuvadi	Mother: Chao Chom Manda Saeng Kalyanamitra	Maternal Grandmother: unknown	Maternal Great-grandfather: unknown
Princess Beatrice Bhadrayuvadi	Mother: Chao Chom Manda Saeng Kalyanamitra	Maternal Grandmother: unknown	Maternal Great-grandmother: unknown
