= Oraongka Ankayuba =

Princess of Siam, daughter of Chulalongkorn

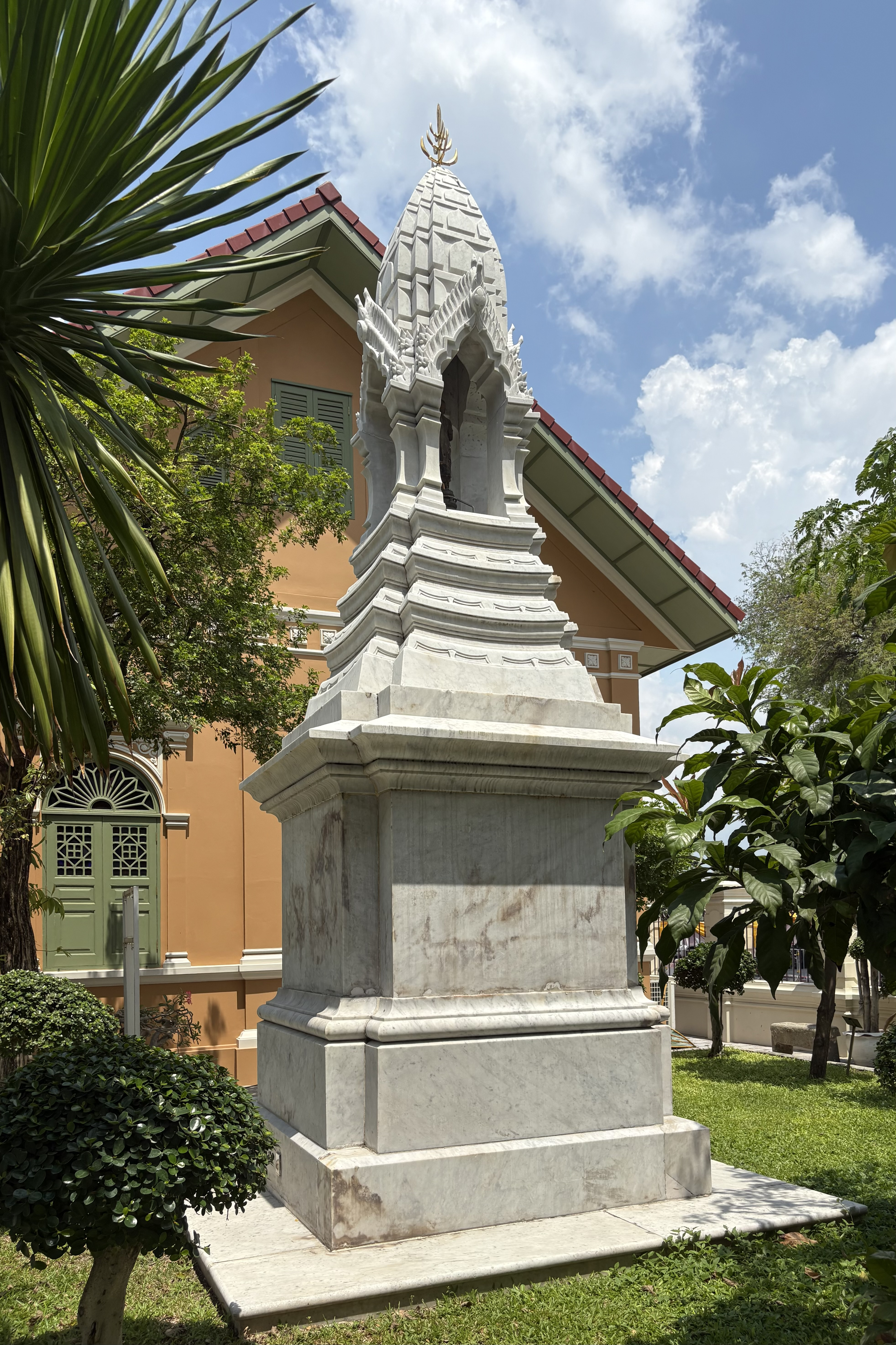
- The princess' mausoleum in Royal Cemetery at Wat Ratchabophit
- Born: 27 October 1881; Grand Palace; Bangkok, Siam
- Died: 20 February 1882 (aged 0); Bangkok, Siam
Names
- Oraongka Ankayuba
- House: Chakri Dynasty
- Father: Chulalongkorn (Rama V)
- Mother: Chao Chom Manda Mohd Bunnag

Princess Oraongka Ankayuba or Phra Chao Boromwongse Ther Phra Ong Chao Oraongka Ankayuba (RTGS: Ora-ong Anyupha) (Thai: พระเจ้าบรมวงศ์เธอ พระองค์เจ้าอรองค์อรรคยุพา) (27 October 1881 – 20 February 1882), was the Princess of Siam (later Thailand). She was a member of the Siamese Royal Family and daughter of Chulalongkorn, King Rama V of Siam.

Her mother was Chao Chom Manda Mohd Bunnag, daughter of Lord (Chao Phraya) Suravongs Vaiyavadhana (son of Somdet Chao Phraya Borom Maha Si Suriyawongse. She had an elder brother and a younger brother:

- Prince Abhakara Kiartiwongse, the Prince of Chumphon (19 December 1880 – 19 May 1923)
- Prince Suriyong Prayurabandh, the Prince of Chaiya (27 July 1884 – 2 May 1919)

Princess Oraongka Ankayuba died in her babyhood on 20 February 1882, at the age of only 4 months.

== Ancestry ==
Ancestor of Princess Oraongka Ankayuba
Princess Oraongka Ankayuba	Father: Chulalongkorn, King Rama V of Siam	Paternal Grandfather: Mongkut, King Rama IV of Siam	Paternal Great-grandfather: Buddha Loetla Nabhalai, King Rama II of Siam
Princess Oraongka Ankayuba	Father: Chulalongkorn, King Rama V of Siam	Paternal Grandfather: Mongkut, King Rama IV of Siam	Paternal Great-grandmother: Queen Sri Suriyendra
Princess Oraongka Ankayuba	Father: Chulalongkorn, King Rama V of Siam	Paternal Grandmother: Queen Debsirindra	Paternal Great-grandfather: Prince Sirivongse, the Prince Matayabidaksa
Princess Oraongka Ankayuba	Father: Chulalongkorn, King Rama V of Siam	Paternal Grandmother: Queen Debsirindra	Paternal Great-grandmother: Mom Noi Sirivongs na Ayudhya
Princess Oraongka Ankayuba	Mother: Chao Chom Manda Mohd Bunnag	Maternal Grandfather: Chao Phraya Suravongs Vaiyavadhana	Maternal Great-grandfather: Somdet Chao Phraya Borom Maha Sri Suriyawongse
Princess Oraongka Ankayuba	Mother: Chao Chom Manda Mohd Bunnag	Maternal Grandfather: Chao Phraya Suravongs Vaiyavadhana	Maternal Great-grandmother: Klin Bunnag
Princess Oraongka Ankayuba	Mother: Chao Chom Manda Mohd Bunnag	Maternal Grandmother: Im Bunnag	Maternal Great-grandfather: unknown
Princess Oraongka Ankayuba	Mother: Chao Chom Manda Mohd Bunnag	Maternal Grandmother: Im Bunnag	Maternal Great-grandmother: unknown
