= Bismai Bimalasataya =

Thai princess

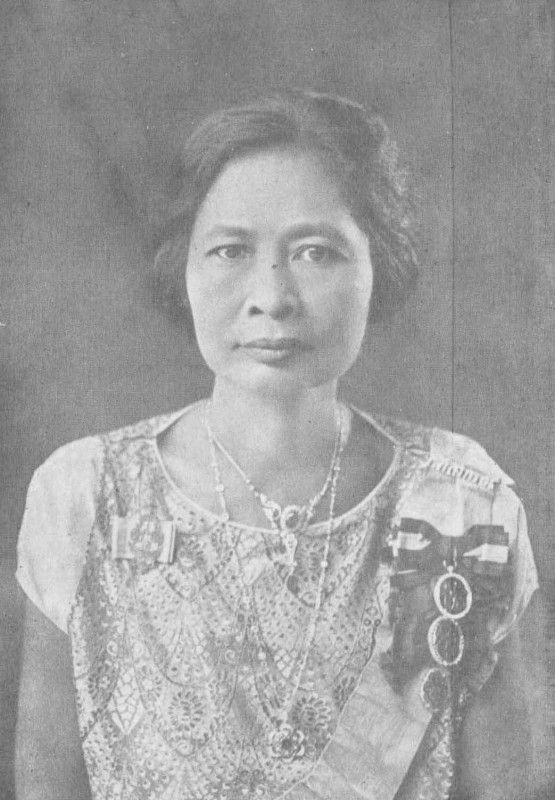
- Born: 20 December 1881; Grand Palace; Bangkok, Siam
- Died: 6 February 1936 (aged 54); Bangkok, Siam
- Bismai Bimalasataya
- House: Chakri dynasty
- Father: Chulalongkorn (Rama V)
- Mother: Chao Chom Manda Ruen

Princess Bismai Bimalasataya or Phra Chao Boromwongse Ther Phra Ong Chao Bismai Bimalasataya (RTGS: Phitsamai Phimonsat) (Thai: พระเจ้าบรมวงศ์เธอ พระองค์เจ้าพิสมัยพิมลสัตย์) (20 December 1881 – 6 February 1936) was the Princess of Siam (later Thailand). She was a member of Siamese Royal Family. She was a daughter of Chulalongkorn, King Rama V of Siam and Chao Chom Manda Ruen.

She died on 6 February 1936, at the age of 54.

== Honours ==
- Dame Grand Commander (Second Class, upper grade) of the Most Illustrious Order of Chula Chom Klao (1899)
- King Rama V Royal Cypher Medal, 2nd Class (1908)
- King Rama VI Royal Cypher Medal, 2nd Class (1912)
- King Rama VII Royal Cypher Medal, 2nd Class (1926)

== Ancestry ==
Ancestor of Princess Bismai Bimalasataya
Princess Bismai Bimalasataya	Father: Chulalongkorn, King Rama V of Siam	Paternal Grandfather: Mongkut, King Rama IV of Siam	Paternal Great-grandfather: Buddha Loetla Nabhalai, King Rama II of Siam
Princess Bismai Bimalasataya	Father: Chulalongkorn, King Rama V of Siam	Paternal Grandfather: Mongkut, King Rama IV of Siam	Paternal Great-grandmother: Queen Sri Suriyendra
Princess Bismai Bimalasataya	Father: Chulalongkorn, King Rama V of Siam	Paternal Grandmother: Queen Debsirindra	Paternal Great-grandfather: Prince Sirivongse, the Prince Matayabidaksa
Princess Bismai Bimalasataya	Father: Chulalongkorn, King Rama V of Siam	Paternal Grandmother: Queen Debsirindra	Paternal Great-grandmother: Mom Noi Sirivongs na Ayudhya
Princess Bismai Bimalasataya	Mother: Chao Chom Manda Ruen	Maternal Grandfather: unknown	Maternal Great-grandfather: unknown
Princess Bismai Bimalasataya	Mother: Chao Chom Manda Ruen	Maternal Grandfather: unknown	Maternal Great-grandmother: unknown
Princess Bismai Bimalasataya	Mother: Chao Chom Manda Ruen	Maternal Grandmother: unknown	Maternal Great-grandfather: unknown
Princess Bismai Bimalasataya	Mother: Chao Chom Manda Ruen	Maternal Grandmother: unknown	Maternal Great-grandmother: unknown
