= Anusara Siriprasadh =

- Born: 21 February 1891; Grand Palace; Bangkok, Siam
- Died: 6 May 1900 (aged 9); Bangkok, Siam
- Anusara Siriprasadh
- House: Chakri dynasty
- Father: Chulalongkorn (Rama V)
- Mother: Mom Rajawongse Kesara Sanidvongse

Prince Anusara Siroprasadh or Phra Chao Boromwongse Ther Phra Ong Chao Anusara Siriprasadh (RTGS: Anusorn Siriprasarth) (Thai: พระเจ้าบรมวงศ์เธอ พระองค์เจ้าอนุสรสิริประสาธน์) (21 February 1891 – 6 May 1900), was the Prince of Siam (later Thailand). He was a son of Chulalongkorn, King Rama V of Siam and a member of the Siamese royal family.

His mother was The Noble Consort (Chao Chom Manda) Mom Rajawongse Kesara Sanidvongse, daughter of Mom Chao Savasdi Sanidvongse. He had an elder full brother, Prince Isariyabhorn.

Prince Anusara Siriprasadh died in childhood on 6 May 1900, at the age of 9 years 3 months.

== Ancestry ==
Ancestor of Prince Anusara Siriprasadh
Prince Anusara Siriprasadh	Father: Chulalongkorn, King Rama V of Siam	Paternal Grandfather: Mongkut, King Rama IV of Siam	Paternal Great-grandfather: Buddha Loetla Nabhalai, King Rama II of Siam
Prince Anusara Siriprasadh	Father: Chulalongkorn, King Rama V of Siam	Paternal Grandfather: Mongkut, King Rama IV of Siam	Paternal Great-grandmother: Queen Sri Suriyendra
Prince Anusara Siriprasadh	Father: Chulalongkorn, King Rama V of Siam	Paternal Grandmother: Queen Debsirindra	Paternal Great-grandfather: Prince Sirivongse, the Prince Matayabidaksa
Prince Anusara Siriprasadh	Father: Chulalongkorn, King Rama V of Siam	Paternal Grandmother: Queen Debsirindra	Paternal Great-grandmother: Mom Noi Sirivongs na Ayudhya
Prince Anusara Siriprasadh	Mother: Mom Rajawongse Kesara Sanidvongse	Maternal Grandfather: Mom Chao Savasdi Sanidvongse	Maternal Great-grandfather: Prince Nuam, the Prince Vongsadhirajsanid
Prince Anusara Siriprasadh	Mother: Mom Rajawongse Kesara Sanidvongse	Maternal Grandfather: Mom Chao Savasdi Sanidvongse	Maternal Great-grandmother: unknown
Prince Anusara Siriprasadh	Mother: Mom Rajawongse Kesara Sanidvongse	Maternal Grandmother: unknown	Maternal Great-grandfather: unknown
Prince Anusara Siriprasadh	Mother: Mom Rajawongse Kesara Sanidvongse	Maternal Grandmother: unknown	Maternal Great-grandmother: unknown
