= Ajrabarni Rajkanya =

Thai princess

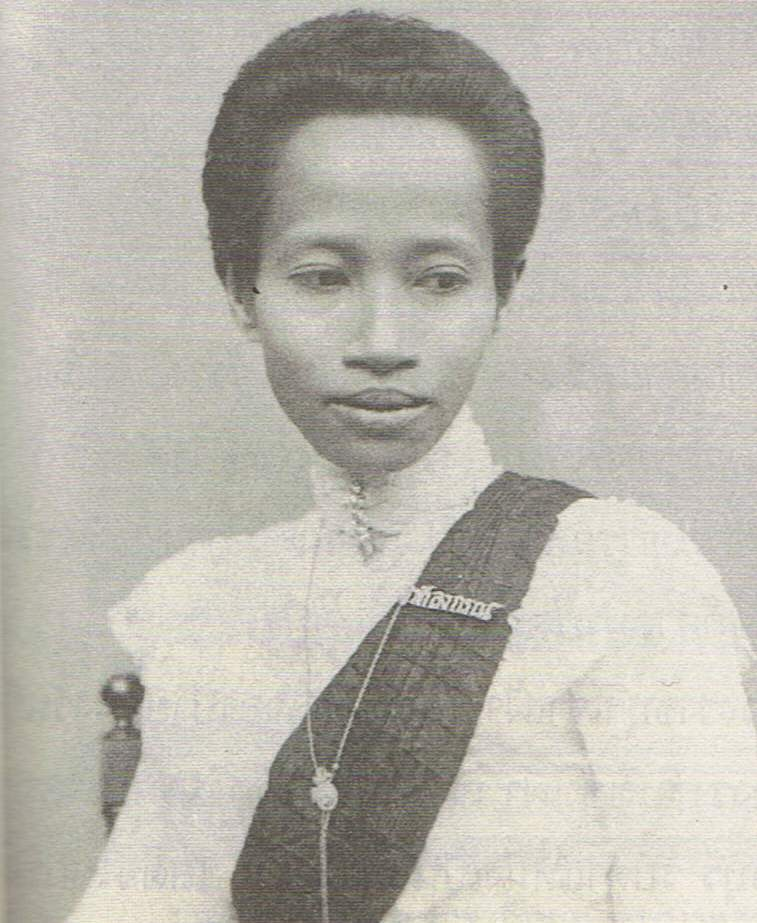
- Born: 7 July 1872; Grand Palace; Bangkok, Siam
- Died: 15 November 1910 (aged 38); Bangkok, Siam
- Ajrabarni Rajkanya
- House: Chakri dynasty
- Father: Chulalongkorn (Rama V)
- Mother: Chao Chom Manda Talab

Princess Ajrabarni Rajkanya or Phra Chao Boromwongse Ther Phra Ong Chao Ajrabarni Rajkanya (RTGS: Atcharaphanni Ratchakanya) (Thai: พระเจ้าบรมวงศ์เธอ พระองค์เจ้าอัจฉรพรรณีรัชกัญญา) (7 July 1872 – 15 November 1910), was the Princess of Siam (later Thailand). She was a member of Siamese royal family. She was a daughter of Chulalongkorn, King Rama V of Siam.

Her mother was Chao Chom Manda Talab Ketutat, daughter of Phraya Viangnai Narubal. She had a younger brother, Prince Raphi Phatthanasak, the Prince of Ratchaburi, who is known as Father of the Thai Law.

Princess Ajrabarni Rajkanya died on 15 November 1910, a month after her father's death, at the age of 38.

== Honours ==
- Dame Grand Commander (Second Class, upper grade) of the Most Illustrious Order of Chula Chom Klao (1899)
- King Rama V Royal Cypher Medal, 2nd Class (1908)

== Ancestry ==
Ancestors of Princess Ajrabarni Rajkanya
Princess Ajrabarni Rajkanya	Father: Chulalongkorn, King Rama V of Siam	Paternal Grandfather: Mongkut, King Rama IV of Siam	Paternal Great-grandfather: Buddha Loetla Nabhalai, King Rama II of Siam
Princess Ajrabarni Rajkanya	Father: Chulalongkorn, King Rama V of Siam	Paternal Grandfather: Mongkut, King Rama IV of Siam	Paternal Great-grandmother: Queen Sri Suriyendra
Princess Ajrabarni Rajkanya	Father: Chulalongkorn, King Rama V of Siam	Paternal Grandmother: Queen Debsirindra	Paternal Great-grandfather: Prince Sirivongse, the Prince Matayabidaksa
Princess Ajrabarni Rajkanya	Father: Chulalongkorn, King Rama V of Siam	Paternal Grandmother: Queen Debsirindra	Paternal Great-grandmother: Mom Noi Sirivongs na Ayudhya
Princess Ajrabarni Rajkanya	Mother: Chao Chom Manda Talab Ketutat	Maternal Grandfather: Phraya Viangnai Narubal (Rhung Ketutat)	Maternal Great-grandfather: Phraya Bejra Bijaya (Noo Ketutat)
Princess Ajrabarni Rajkanya	Mother: Chao Chom Manda Talab Ketutat	Maternal Grandfather: Phraya Viangnai Narubal (Rhung Ketutat)	Maternal Great-grandmother: unknown
Princess Ajrabarni Rajkanya	Mother: Chao Chom Manda Talab Ketutat	Maternal Grandmother: unknown	Maternal Great-grandfather: unknown
Princess Ajrabarni Rajkanya	Mother: Chao Chom Manda Talab Ketutat	Maternal Grandmother: unknown	Maternal Great-grandmother: unknown
