= Phongpraphai =

Princess of Siam, first child of Rama V

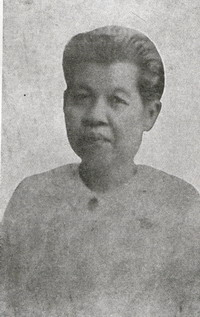
- Born: Mom Chao Phongpraphai; 19 December 1867; Grand Palace, Bangkok, Siam
- Died: 1 March 1942 (aged 74); Bangkok, Thailand
Names
- Phongpraphai
- Dynasty: Chakri
- Father: Chulalongkorn (Rama V)
- Mother: Noble Consort Khae Phuengbun

Princess Phongpraphai or Phra Chao Boromwongse Ther Phra Ong Chao Phongpraphai (Thai: พระเจ้าบรมวงศ์เธอ พระองค์เจ้าผ่องประไพ) (19 December 1867 – 1 March 1942), was a Princess of Siam (later Thailand). She was a member of the Siamese royal family and the first child of Chulalongkorn, King Rama V of Siam.

== Birth ==
Princess Phongpraphai was born on 19 December 1867 at the Grand Palace, Bangkok. She was the first child of King Chulalongkorn (Rama V) and Noble Consort Khae Phuengbun. When she was born, her father was still the heir-apparent as Prince Chulalongkorn, Kromma Khun Pinit Prachanart. He became a father at age 14 with Mom Rajawongse Khae who was his nanny. The infant was given a title of Mom Chao in the Serene Highness style. When her father succeeded to the throne in 1868, Mom Chao Phongpraphai was elevated to Phra Ong Chao, or Princess, in the Royal Highness style. Mom Rajawongse Khae, her mother, became the first Chao Chom Manda (Noble Consort) of the reign.

Not long after she was born, the baby was brought by Chao Chom Manda Tieng, the noble consort of King Mongkut (Rama IV) to the king. The king inquired about her parents but the consort instead asked him whom she looked like. He answered that the baby looked like Queen Debsirindra, his queen consort who was Prince Chulalongkorn's mother. He then realized that the baby was Prince Chulalongkorn's. The king was angry with both the Prince and Mom Rajawongse Khae for having a baby at such age, but he did not punish them.

== Life and death ==
After her father became King, Phongpraphai and her mother lived in their own residence within the Grand Palace for the remainder of their lives. She had many step-siblings including Princess Srivilailaksana, the Princess of Suphanburi.

In 1873, King Chulalongkorn changed the policy of how those in his presence should behave from the ancient tradition of crouching to the western tradition of standing or sitting on the chair. Every member of the royal family, including the officers, adopted the new tradition, except Phongpraphai who continued to crouch. In response, King Chulalongkorn pulled her daughter's tuft in an unsuccessful attempt to make her stand.

Phongpraphai died on 1 March 1942, at the age of 74.

== Ancestry ==
Ancestors of Princess Phongpraphai
Princess Phongpraphai	Father: Chulalongkorn, King Rama V of Siam	Paternal Grandfather: Mongkut, King Rama IV of Siam	Paternal Great-grandfather: Buddha Loetla Nabhalai, King Rama II of Siam
Princess Phongpraphai	Father: Chulalongkorn, King Rama V of Siam	Paternal Grandfather: Mongkut, King Rama IV of Siam	Paternal Great-grandmother: Queen Sri Suriyendra
Princess Phongpraphai	Father: Chulalongkorn, King Rama V of Siam	Paternal Grandmother: Queen Debsirindra	Paternal Great-grandfather: Prince Sirivongse, the Prince Matayabidaksa
Princess Phongpraphai	Father: Chulalongkorn, King Rama V of Siam	Paternal Grandmother: Queen Debsirindra	Paternal Great-grandmother: Mom Noi Sirivongs na Ayudhya
Princess Phongpraphai	Mother: Chao Chom Manda Khae Phuengbun	Maternal Grandfather: Mom Chao Nok Phuengbunya	Maternal Great-grandfather: Prince Kraisara, the Prince Raksaronares
Princess Phongpraphai	Mother: Chao Chom Manda Khae Phuengbun	Maternal Grandfather: Mom Chao Nok Phuengbunya	Maternal Great-grandmother: unknown
Princess Phongpraphai	Mother: Chao Chom Manda Khae Phuengbun	Maternal Grandmother: unknown	Maternal Great-grandfather: unknown
Princess Phongpraphai	Mother: Chao Chom Manda Khae Phuengbun	Maternal Grandmother: unknown	Maternal Great-grandmother: unknown
