= Komala Saovamala =

Princess of Siam, daughter of Chulalongkorn

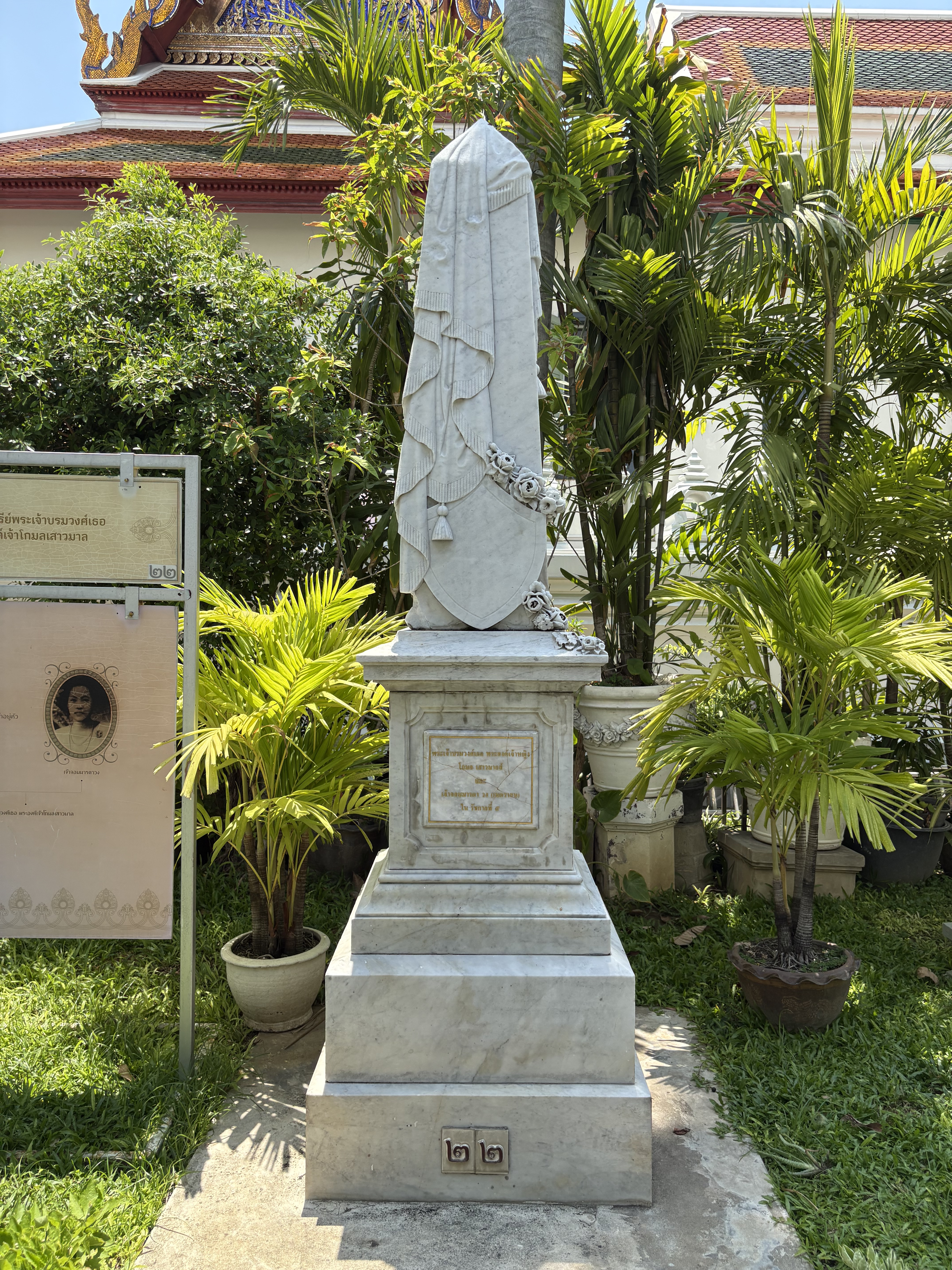
- Tomb of Komala Saovamala in Royal Cemetery at Wat Ratchabophit
- Born: 19 September 1887; Grand Palace; Bangkok, Siam
- Died: 19 April 1890 (aged 2); Bangkok, Siam
Names
- Her Royal Highness Princess Komala Saovamala
- House: Chakri dynasty
- Father: Chulalongkorn (Rama V)
- Mother: Chao Chom Manda Wong

Princess Komala Saovabha or Phra Chao Boromwongse Ther Phra Ong Chao Komala Saovamala (RTGS: Komon Saowaman; Thai: พระเจ้าบรมวงศ์เธอ พระองค์เจ้าโกมลเสาวมาล) (19 September 1887 – 19 April 1890), was the Princess of Siam (later Thailand). She was a member of the Siamese Royal Family. She was a daughter of Chulalongkorn, King Rama V of Siam and Chao Chom Manda Wong.

She died in her babyhood on 19 April 1890, at the age of only 2 years and 7 months.

== Ancestry ==
Ancestor of Princess Komala Saovamala
Princess Komala Saovamala	Father: Chulalongkorn, King Rama V of Siam	Paternal Grandfather: Mongkut, King Rama IV of Siam	Paternal Great-grandfather: Buddha Loetla Nabhalai, King Rama II of Siam
Princess Komala Saovamala	Father: Chulalongkorn, King Rama V of Siam	Paternal Grandfather: Mongkut, King Rama IV of Siam	Paternal Great-grandmother: Queen Sri Suriyendra
Princess Komala Saovamala	Father: Chulalongkorn, King Rama V of Siam	Paternal Grandmother: Queen Debsirindra	Paternal Great-grandfather: Prince Sirivongse, the Prince Matayabidaksa
Princess Komala Saovamala	Father: Chulalongkorn, King Rama V of Siam	Paternal Grandmother: Queen Debsirindra	Paternal Great-grandmother: Mom Noi Sirivongs na Ayudhya
Princess Komala Saovamala	Mother: Chao Chom Manda Wong	Maternal Grandfather: Phraya Akkaraj Narthbhakdi (Net Netrayon)	Maternal Great-grandfather: Phraya Samudraburaraksa (Kerd)
Princess Komala Saovamala	Mother: Chao Chom Manda Wong	Maternal Grandfather: Phraya Akkaraj Narthbhakdi (Net Netrayon)	Maternal Great-grandmother: Muang
Princess Komala Saovamala	Mother: Chao Chom Manda Wong	Maternal Grandmother: Lady Arun	Maternal Great-grandfather: Lord Mahamonthian (Chui)
Princess Komala Saovamala	Mother: Chao Chom Manda Wong	Maternal Grandmother: Lady Arun	Maternal Great-grandmother: Num
