= Voralaksanavadi =

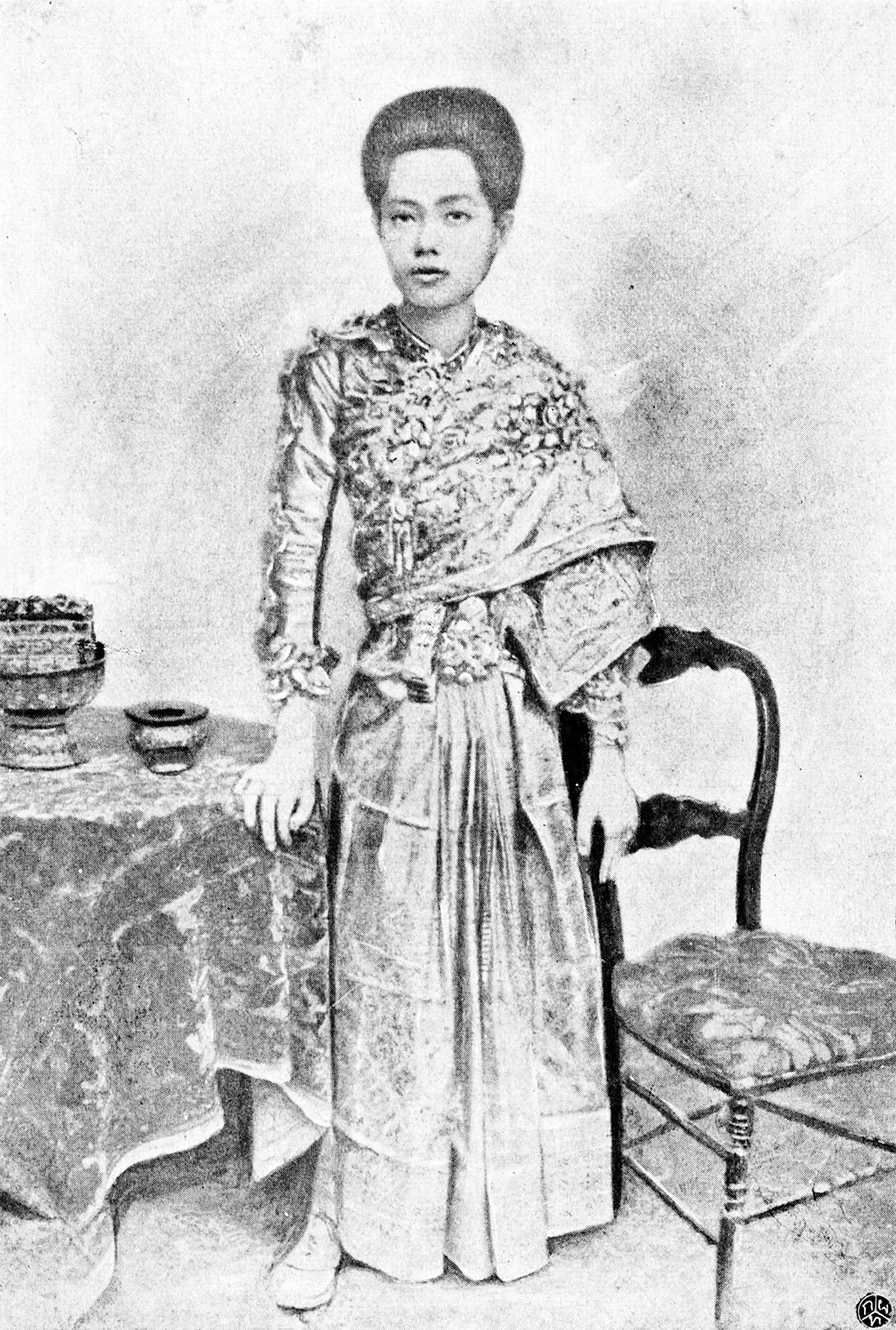
- Born: 12 June 1872; Grand Palace, Bangkok, Siam
- Died: 18 August 1926 (aged 54); Bangkok, Siam
Names
- Her Royal Highness; Princess Voralaksanavadi
- House: Chakri dynasty
- Father: Chulalongkorn (Rama V)
- Mother: Chao Chom Manda Sud Sukumolchan

Voralaksanavadi (Thai: วรลักษณาวดี; RTGS: Woralaksanawadi; 12 June 1872 – 18 August 1926), was the Princess of Siam (later Thailand). She was a member of the Siamese royal family. She was a daughter of Chulalongkorn, King Rama V of Siam.

Her mother was The Noble Consort (Chao Chom Manda) Sud Sukumolchan (daughter of Phraya Surindorn Rajseni and Khunying Klin). She died on 18 August 1926, at the age of 54 years 10 months.

== Royal Decoration ==
- Dame Cross of the Most Illustrious Order of Chula Chom Klao (First class): received 12 November 1911.

== Ancestry ==
Ancestor of Princess Voralaksanavadi
| Princess Voralaksanavadi | Father: Chulalongkorn, King Rama V of Siam | Paternal Grandfather: Mongkut, King Rama IV of Siam | Paternal Great-grandfather: Buddha Loetla Nabhalai, King Rama II of Siam |
| Princess Voralaksanavadi | Father: Chulalongkorn, King Rama V of Siam | Paternal Grandfather: Mongkut, King Rama IV of Siam | Paternal Great-grandmother: Queen Sri Suriyendra |
| Princess Voralaksanavadi | Father: Chulalongkorn, King Rama V of Siam | Paternal Grandmother: Queen Debsirindra | Paternal Great-grandfather: Prince Sirivongse, the Prince Matayabidaksa |
| Princess Voralaksanavadi | Father: Chulalongkorn, King Rama V of Siam | Paternal Grandmother: Queen Debsirindra | Paternal Great-grandmother: Mom Noi Sirivongs na Ayudhya |
| Princess Voralaksanavadi | Mother: Chao Chom Manda Sud Sukumolchan | Maternal Grandfather: Phraya Surindorn Rajaseni | Maternal Great-grandfather: unknown |
| Princess Voralaksanavadi | Mother: Chao Chom Manda Sud Sukumolchan | Maternal Grandfather: Phraya Surindorn Rajaseni | Maternal Great-grandmother: unknown |
| Princess Voralaksanavadi | Mother: Chao Chom Manda Sud Sukumolchan | Maternal Grandmother: Khunying Klin Sukumolchan | Maternal Great-grandfather: unknown |
| Princess Voralaksanavadi | Mother: Chao Chom Manda Sud Sukumolchan | Maternal Grandmother: Khunying Klin Sukumolchan | Maternal Great-grandmother: unknown |
