= Oraprabandh Rambai =

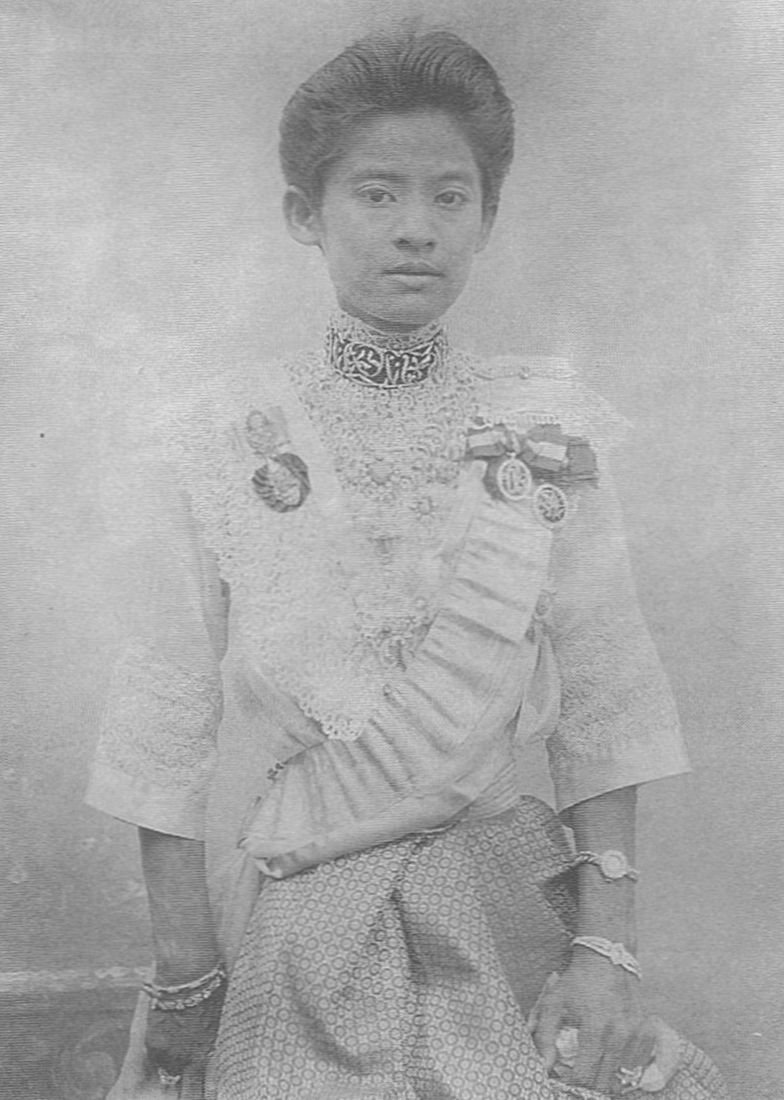
- Born: 7 July 1885; Grand Palace, Bangkok, Siam
- Died: 25 May 1933 (aged 47); On-at Villa, Cha-am, Siam
Names
- Oraprabandh Rambai
- House: Chakri dynasty
- Father: Chulalongkorn (Rama V)
- Mother: On Bunnag

Princess Oraprabandh Rambai (Thai: อรประพันธ์รำไพ; RTGS: Onpraphanramphai; 7 July 1885 – 25 May 1933), was the Princess of Siam (later Thailand). She was a member of Siamese royal family. She was a daughter of Chulalongkorn.

Her mother was On Bunnag, daughter of Lord (Chao Phraya) Surabandh Bisudhi (niece of Si Suriyawongse). She is the elder sister of Princess Adisaya Suriyabha. She, her mother, and younger sister lived together firstly in the Grand Palace, then moved to the area of Dusit Palace, and lived there for the rest of her life.

After an illness, she died on 25 May 1933, at the age of 47.

== Royal Decorations ==
- Dame Cross of the Most Illustrious Order of Chula Chom Klao (First class): received 25 November 1906

== Ancestry ==
Ancestors of Oraprabandh Rambai

16. Phutthayotfa Chulalok
8. Phutthaloetla Naphalai
17. Amarindra
4. Mongkut
18. Ngoen Saetan
9. Sri Suriyendra
19. Kaeo, Princess Si Sudarak
2. Chulalongkorn
20. Nangklao
10. Siriwongse, Prince Mattayaphithak
21. Sap
5. Debsirindra
22. But
11. Noi Siriwongse na Ayudhaya
23. Chaem
1. Oraprabandh Rambai
24. Lord Akkha Mahasena (Bunnag)
12. Lord Borom Maha Prayurawongse (Tish Bunnag)
25. Nuan Na Bangxang
6. Lord Suraphanphisut (Thet Bunnag)
26.
13. Run Bunnag
27.
3. On Bunnag
28. Lord Wongsa Surasak (Saeng Vongsarojana)
14. Lord Phakdi Narue-bodin (Kung Vongsarojana)
29.
7. U Vongsarojana
30.
15.
31.
