= Orabindu Benyabhak =

Siamese princess

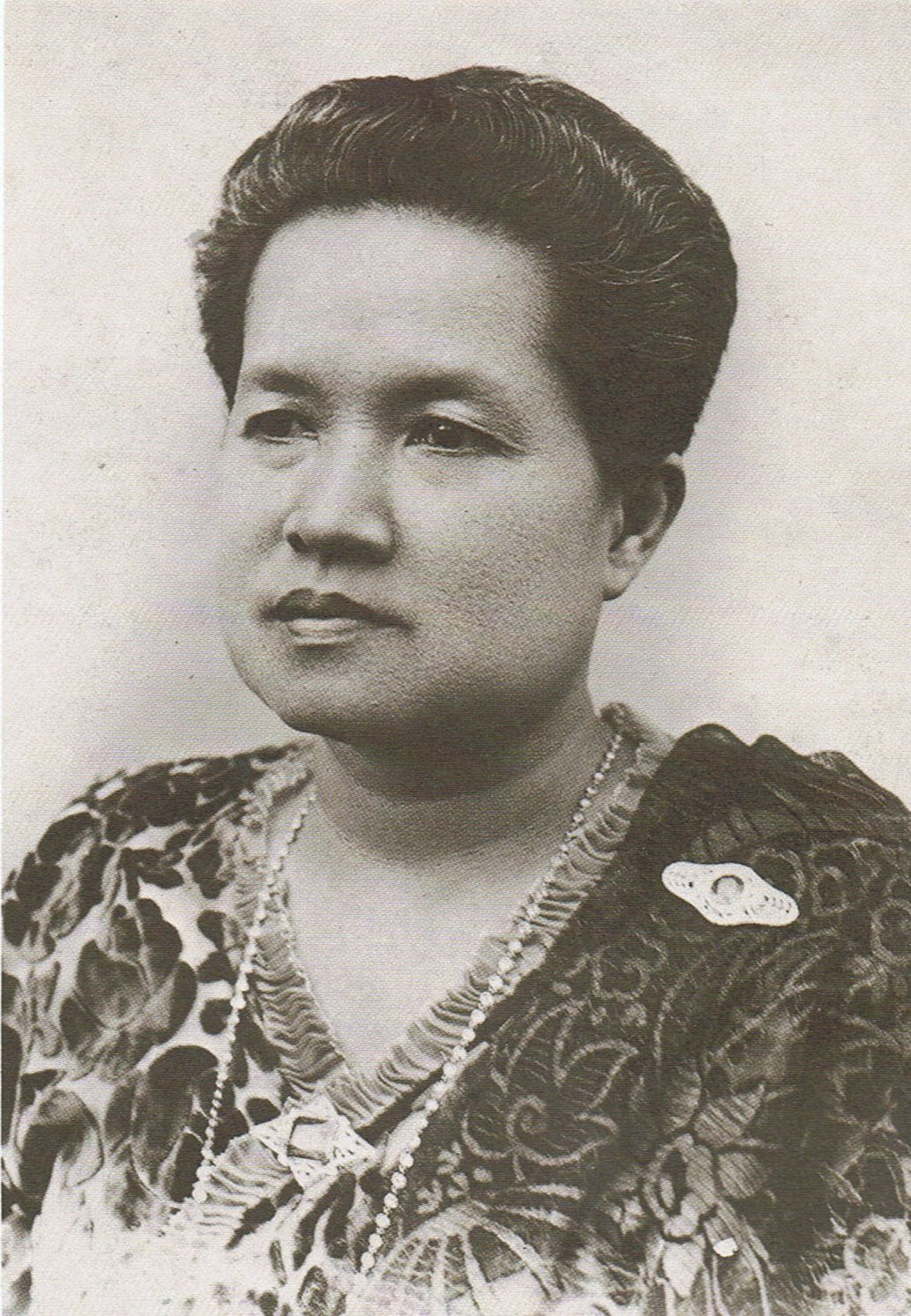
- Benyabhak in 1925
- Born: 27 April 1873; Grand Palace; Bangkok, Siam
- Died: 26 January 1935 (aged 61); Bangkok, Siam
Names
- Orabindu Benyabhak
- House: Chakri dynasty
- Father: Chulalongkorn (Rama V)
- Mother: Mom Rajawongse Yoi Isarankura

Princess Orabindu Benyabhak or Phra Chao Boromwongse Ther Phra Ong Chao Orabindu Benyabhak (RTGS: Oraphin Phenphak) (Thai: พระเจ้าบรมวงศ์เธอ พระองค์เจ้าอรพินทุ์เพ็ญภาค) (27 April 1873 – 26 January 1935), was a Princess of Siam (later Thailand. Princess Benyabhak was a member of the Siamese royal family. She was a daughter of Chulalongkorn, King Rama V of Siam.

Her mother was Chao Chom Manda Mom Rajawongse Yoi Isarankura, daughter of Mom Chao Sobhon Isarankura (son of Prince Kes, the Prince Isranuraksa, who originated the Royal House of Isrankura.

== Royal Duties ==
Princess Orabindu Benyabhak carried out many royal duties for Thai people. She performed many duties on behalf of her father, King Chulalongkorn, and on behalf of her half brother, King Vajiravudh (Rama VI). In 1916, she established the Orabindu building in Wat Bowornniwes School, which is a single-floor building, with 7 classrooms.

Moreover, when she was suffering from illness, she signed her will, donating 50,000 bahts as the scholarship and foundation of Chulalongkorn Hospital, for helping people suffering sickness.

Princess Orabindu Benyabhak died on 26 January 1935, at the age of 61.

== Royal Decorations ==
- Dame Cross of the Most Illustrious Order of Chula Chom Klao (First class): received 16 November 1930

== Ancestry ==
Ancestor of Princess Orabindu Benyabhak
Princess Orabindu Benyabhak	Father: Chulalongkorn, King Rama V of Siam	Paternal Grandfather: Mongkut, King Rama IV of Siam	Paternal Great-grandfather: Buddha Loetla Nabhalai, King Rama II of Siam
Princess Orabindu Benyabhak	Father: Chulalongkorn, King Rama V of Siam	Paternal Grandfather: Mongkut, King Rama IV of Siam	Paternal Great-grandmother: Queen Sri Suriyendra
Princess Orabindu Benyabhak	Father: Chulalongkorn, King Rama V of Siam	Paternal Grandmother: Queen Debsirindra	Paternal Great-grandfather: Prince Sirivongse, the Prince Matayabidaksa
Princess Orabindu Benyabhak	Father: Chulalongkorn, King Rama V of Siam	Paternal Grandmother: Queen Debsirindra	Paternal Great-grandmother: Mom Noi Sirivongs na Ayudhya
Princess Orabindu Benyabhak	Mother: Mom Rajawongse Yoi Isrankura	Maternal Grandfather: Mom Chao Sobhon Isrankura	Maternal Great-grandfather: Prince Kes, the Prince Isranuraksa
Princess Orabindu Benyabhak	Mother: Mom Rajawongse Yoi Isrankura	Maternal Grandfather: Mom Chao Sobhon Isrankura	Maternal Great-grandmother: unknown
Princess Orabindu Benyabhak	Mother: Mom Rajawongse Yoi Isrankura	Maternal Grandmother: unknown	Maternal Great-grandfather: unknown
Princess Orabindu Benyabhak	Mother: Mom Rajawongse Yoi Isrankura	Maternal Grandmother: unknown	Maternal Great-grandmother: unknown
