= Praves Vorasamai =

Princess of Siam

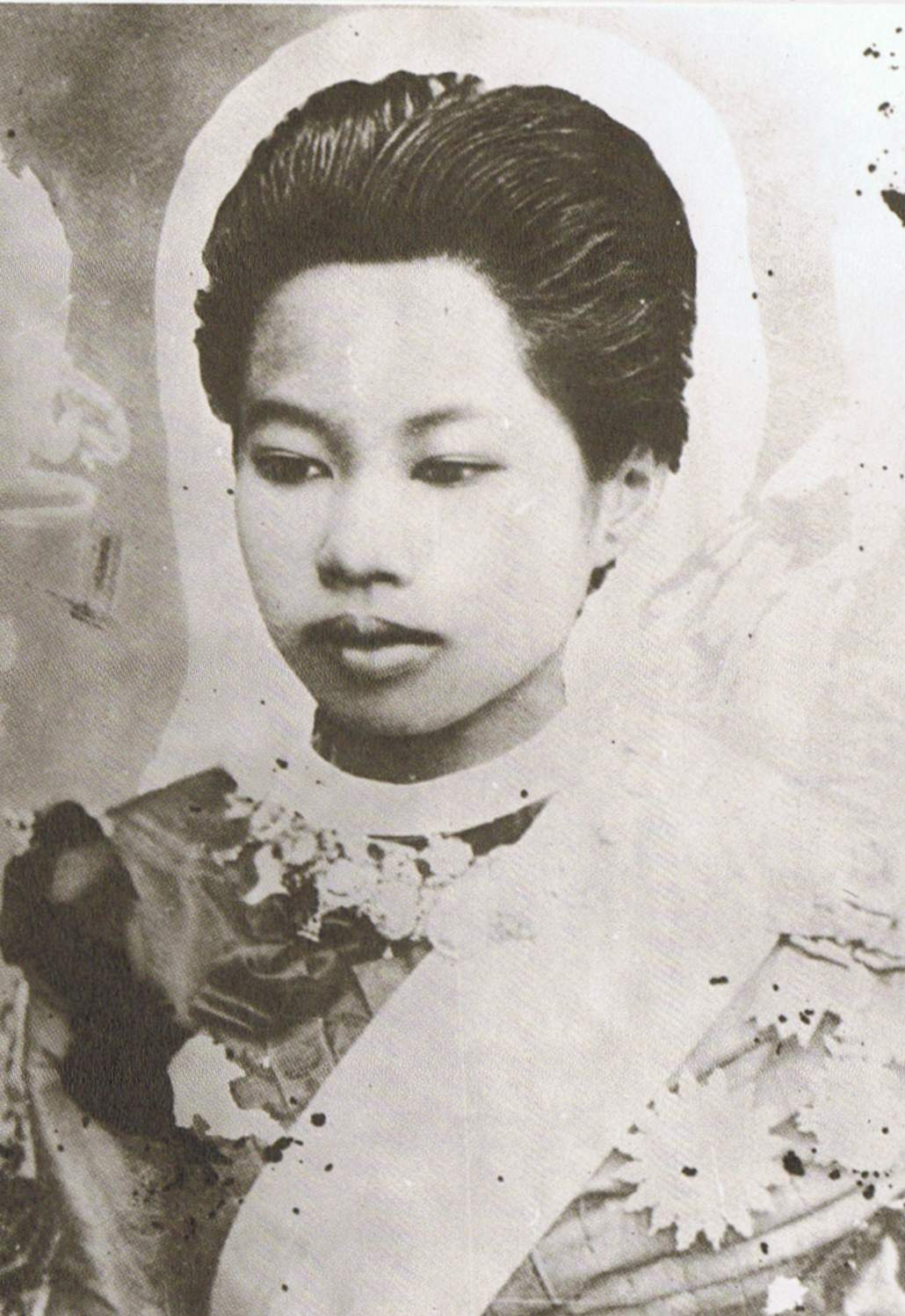
- Born: 2 December 1879; Grand Palace; Bangkok, Siam
- Died: 31 May 1944 (aged 64); Bangkok, Siam
Names
- Praves Vorasamai
- House: Chakri dynasty
- Father: Chulalongkorn (Rama V)
- Mother: Chao Chom Manda Tabtim Rojanadis

Princess Praves Vorasamai or Phra Chao Boromwongse Ther Phra Ong Chao Praves Vorasamai (RTGS: Prawet Worasamai) (Thai: พระเจ้าบรมวงศ์เธอ พระองค์เจ้าประเวศวรสมัย) (2 December 1879 – 31 May 1944), was a Princess of Siam (later Thailand. She was a member of Siamese royal family. She is a daughter of Chulalongkorn, King Rama V of Siam.

Her mother was Tabtim Rojanadis, daughter of Phraya Abbhantrikamas and Bang Rojanadis, elder sister of Chao Chom Manda Sae. She had a full elder brother and a younger brother;

- Prince Chirapravati Voradej, the Prince of Nakhon Chaisi (7 November 1876 – 4 February 1913)
- Prince Vudhijaya Chalermlabha, the Prince Singhavikrom Kriangkrai (5 December 1883 – 18 October 1947)

Princess Praves Vorasamai died on 31 May 1944, at the age of 64.

== Ancestry ==
Ancestor of Princess Praves Vorasamai
Princess Praves Vorasamai	Father: Chulalongkorn, King Rama V of Siam	Paternal Grandfather: Mongkut, King Rama IV of Siam	Paternal Great-grandfather: Buddha Loetla Nabhalai, King Rama II of Siam
Princess Praves Vorasamai	Father: Chulalongkorn, King Rama V of Siam	Paternal Grandfather: Mongkut, King Rama IV of Siam	Paternal Great-grandmother: Queen Sri Suriyendra
Princess Praves Vorasamai	Father: Chulalongkorn, King Rama V of Siam	Paternal Grandmother: Queen Debsirindra	Paternal Great-grandfather: Prince Sirivongse, the Prince Matayabidaksa
Princess Praves Vorasamai	Father: Chulalongkorn, King Rama V of Siam	Paternal Grandmother: Queen Debsirindra	Paternal Great-grandmother: Mom Noi Sirivongs na Ayudhya
Princess Praves Vorasamai	Mother: Chao Chom Manda Tabtim Rojanadis	Maternal Grandfather: Phraya Abbhantrikamas	Maternal Great-grandfather: unknown
Princess Praves Vorasamai	Mother: Chao Chom Manda Tabtim Rojanadis	Maternal Grandfather: Phraya Abbhantrikamas	Maternal Great-grandmother: unknown
Princess Praves Vorasamai	Mother: Chao Chom Manda Tabtim Rojanadis	Maternal Grandmother: Bang Rojanadis	Maternal Great-grandfather: unknown
Princess Praves Vorasamai	Mother: Chao Chom Manda Tabtim Rojanadis	Maternal Grandmother: Bang Rojanadis	Maternal Great-grandmother: unknown
