= Adisaya Suriyabha =

Princess of Siam (later Thailand)

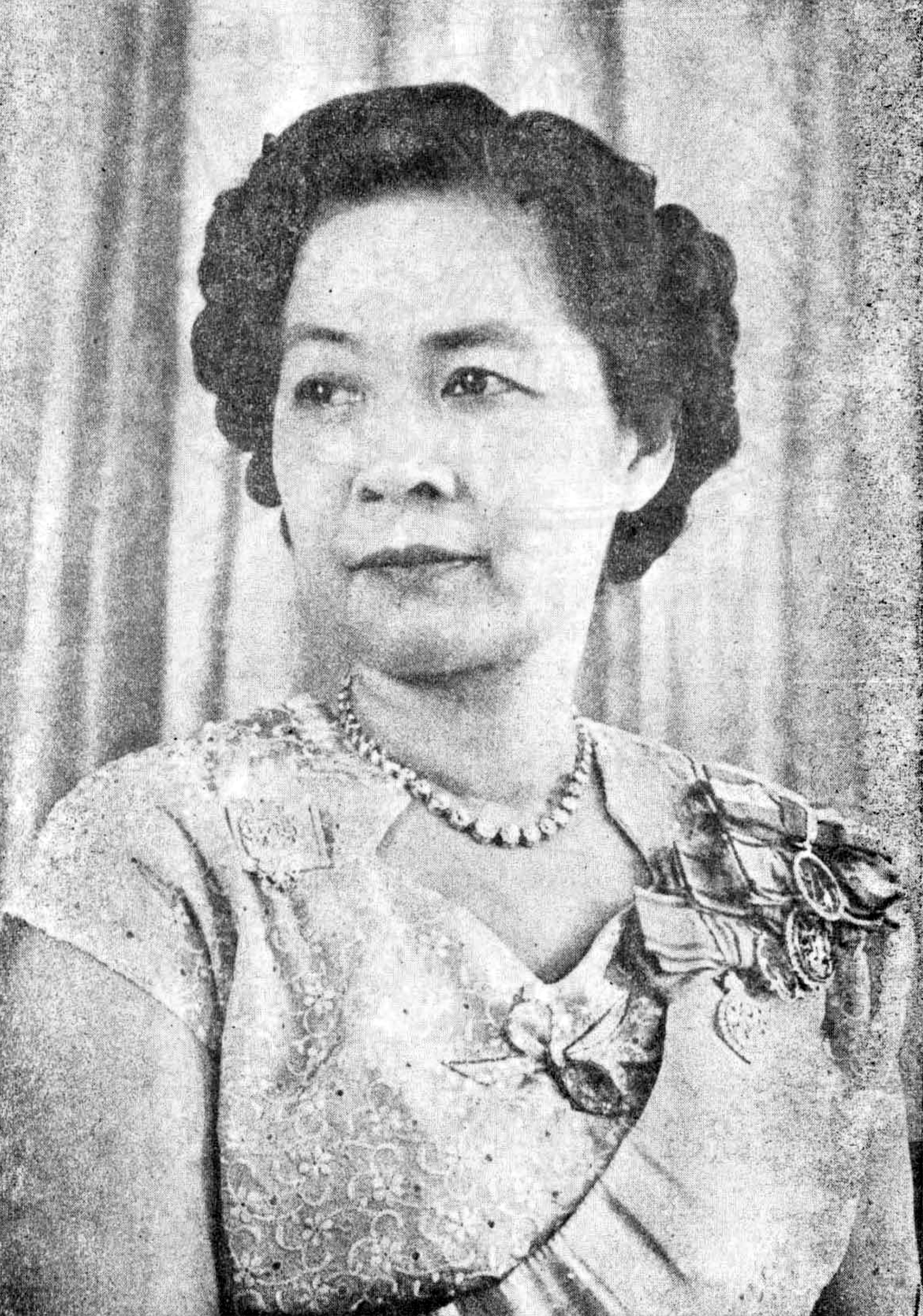
- Born: 14 February 1889; Grand Palace; Bangkok, Siam
- Died: 27 January 1963 (aged 73); Bangkok, Thailand
- House: Chakri Dynasty
- Father: Chulalongkorn (Rama V)
- Mother: On Bunnag

Adisaya Suriyabha (Thai: อดิศัยสุริยาภา; RTGS: Adisai Suriyapha; 14 February 1889 – 27 January 1963) was the Princess of Siam (later Thailand). She was a member of Siamese Royal Family. She was a daughter of Chulalongkorn, King Rama V of Siam.

Her mother was Chao Chom Manda Aon Bunnag, daughter of Lord (Chao Phraya) Surabandh Bisudhi (niece of Si Suriyawongse). She was the younger sister of Princess Oraprabandh Rambai. She and her mother, and elder sister lived together firstly in the Grand Palace, then moved to the area of Dusit Palace, and lived there all of her life.

She died on 27 January 1963, at the age of 73.

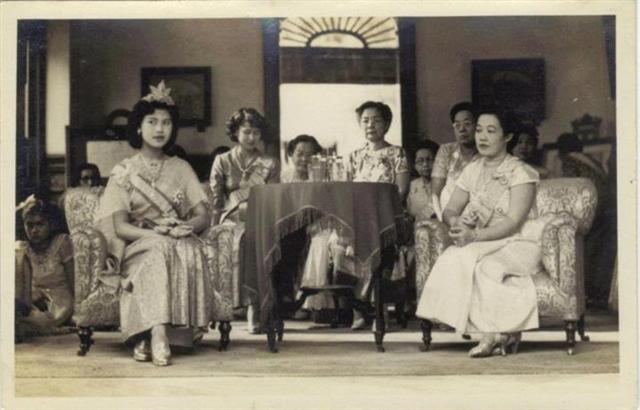
Queen Sirikit (Far left), Princess Galyani Vadhana (center), Princess Hemvadi, Princess Adisaya Suriyabha, Princess Adorn Dibyanibha and Queen Rambhai Barni (right) in 1950

== Honours ==
- Dame of the Most Illustrious Order of the Royal House of Chakri (9 May 1950)
- Dame Grand Cross (First Class) of the Most Illustrious Order of Chula Chom Klao (2 May 1950)
- King Rama V Royal Cypher Medal, 2nd Class (1908)
- King Rama VI Royal Cypher Medal, 2nd Class (1913)
- King Rama VII Royal Cypher Medal, 2nd Class (1926)
- King Rama VIII Royal Cypher Medal, 1st Class (1938)
- King Rama IX Royal Cypher Medal, 1st Class (1953)

Adisaya Suriyabha Chakri dynasty Born: 14 February 1889 Died: 27 January 1963
Order of precedence
Preceded by Princess Pradittha Sari	Eldest Royal Member of the Chakri Dynasty; 1962–1963	Succeeded by Princess Vapi Busbakara
