= Chudharatana Rajakumari =

Princess of Siam (later Thailand)

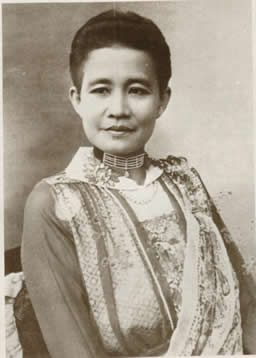
- Born: 17 December 1872; Grand Palace; Bangkok, Siam
- Died: 31 December 1930 (aged 58); Bangkok, Siam
Names
- Chudharatana Rajakumari
- House: Chakri dynasty
- Father: Chulalongkorn (Rama V)
- Mother: Chao Chom Manda Morakot Phenkul

Princess Chudharatana Rajakumari or Phra Chao Boromwongse Ther Phra Ong Chao Chudharatana Rajakumari (RTGS: Chutharat Ratchakumari) (Thai: พระเจ้าบรมวงศ์เธอ พระองค์เจ้าจุฑารัตนราชกุมารี) (17 December 1872 – 31 December 1930) was a Princess of Siam (later Thailand). She was a member of the Siamese royal family. She is a daughter of Chulalongkorn, King Rama V of Siam.

Her mother was The Noble Consort (Chao Chom Manda) Morakot Phenkul, daughter of Lord (Phraya) Mahindrasakdi Dhamrong and Dame (Thanpuying) Hunn Phenkul. She had a younger brother, Prince Benbadhanabongse, Prince of Phichai. She died on 31 December 1930, at the age of 58.

== Royal Decoration ==
- Dame Cross of the Most Illustrious Order of Chula Chom Klao (First class): received 26 November 1926

== Ancestry ==
Ancestor of Princess Chudharatana Rajakumari
| Princess Chudharatana Rajakumari | Father: Chulalongkorn, King Rama V of Siam | Paternal Grandfather: Mongkut, King Rama IV of Siam | Paternal Great-grandfather: Buddha Loetla Nabhalai, King Rama II of Siam |
| Princess Chudharatana Rajakumari | Father: Chulalongkorn, King Rama V of Siam | Paternal Grandfather: Mongkut, King Rama IV of Siam | Paternal Great-grandmother: Queen Sri Suriyendra |
| Princess Chudharatana Rajakumari | Father: Chulalongkorn, King Rama V of Siam | Paternal Grandmother: Queen Debsirindra | Paternal Great-grandfather: Prince Sirivongse, the Prince Matayabidaksa |
| Princess Chudharatana Rajakumari | Father: Chulalongkorn, King Rama V of Siam | Paternal Grandmother: Queen Debsirindra | Paternal Great-grandmother: Mom Noi Sirivongs na Ayudhya |
| Princess Chudharatana Rajakumari | Mother: Chao Chom Manda Morakot Phenkul | Maternal Grandfather: Phraya Mahindrasakdi Dhamrong | Maternal Great-grandfather: Lord (Khun) Chinda Pichitra |
| Princess Chudharatana Rajakumari | Mother: Chao Chom Manda Morakot Phenkul | Maternal Grandfather: Phraya Mahindrasakdi Dhamrong | Maternal Great-grandmother: Mon Phenkul |
| Princess Chudharatana Rajakumari | Mother: Chao Chom Manda Morakot Phenkul | Maternal Grandmother: Thanpuying Hun Phenkul | Maternal Great-grandfather: Phraya Nakornindra Ramanya |
| Princess Chudharatana Rajakumari | Mother: Chao Chom Manda Morakot Phenkul | Maternal Grandmother: Thanpuying Hun Phenkul | Maternal Great-grandmother: unknown |
