= Sasibongse Prabai =

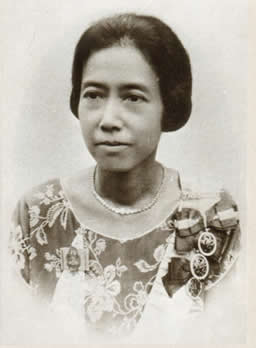
- Born: 26 April 1881; Grand Palace; Bangkok, Siam
- Died: 31 May 1934 (aged 53); Bangkok, Siam
Names
- Sasibongse Prabai
- House: Chakri dynasty
- Father: Chulalongkorn (Rama V)
- Mother: Chao Chom Manda Chan

Princess Sasibongse Prabai or Phra Chao Boromwongse Ther Phra Ong Chao Sasibongse Prabai (RTGS: Sasiphong Praphai) (Thai: พระเจ้าบรมวงศ์เธอ พระองค์เจ้าศศิพงศ์ประไพ) (26 April 1881 – 31 May 1934), was a Princess of Siam (later Thailand. She was a member of Siamese royal family. She is a daughter of Chulalongkorn, King Rama V of Siam.

Her mother was Chao Chom Manda Chan, daughter of Lord (Phraya) Rajasam Bharakorn. Princess Sasibongse Prabai died on 31 May 1934, at the age of 53.

== Ancestry ==
Ancestor of Princess Sasibongse Prabai
Princess Sasibongse Prabai	Father: Chulalongkorn, King Rama V of Siam	Paternal Grandfather: Mongkut, King Rama IV of Siam	Paternal Great-grandfather: Buddha Loetla Nabhalai, King Rama II of Siam
Princess Sasibongse Prabai	Father: Chulalongkorn, King Rama V of Siam	Paternal Grandfather: Mongkut, King Rama IV of Siam	Paternal Great-grandmother: Queen Sri Suriyendra
Princess Sasibongse Prabai	Father: Chulalongkorn, King Rama V of Siam	Paternal Grandmother: Queen Debsirindra	Paternal Great-grandfather: Prince Sirivongse, the Prince Matayabidaksa
Princess Sasibongse Prabai	Father: Chulalongkorn, King Rama V of Siam	Paternal Grandmother: Queen Debsirindra	Paternal Great-grandmother: Mom Noi Sirivongs na Ayudhya
Princess Sasibongse Prabai	Mother: Chao Chom Manda Chan	Maternal Grandfather: Phraya Rajasam Bharakorn	Maternal Great-grandfather: unknown
Princess Sasibongse Prabai	Mother: Chao Chom Manda Chan	Maternal Grandfather: Phraya Rajasam Bharakorn	Maternal Great-grandmother: unknown
Princess Sasibongse Prabai	Mother: Chao Chom Manda Chan	Maternal Grandmother: unknown	Maternal Great-grandfather: unknown
Princess Sasibongse Prabai	Mother: Chao Chom Manda Chan	Maternal Grandmother: unknown	Maternal Great-grandmother: unknown
