= Benbadhanabongse =

Benbadhanabongse เพ็ญพัฒนพงศ์
- Prince of Phichai
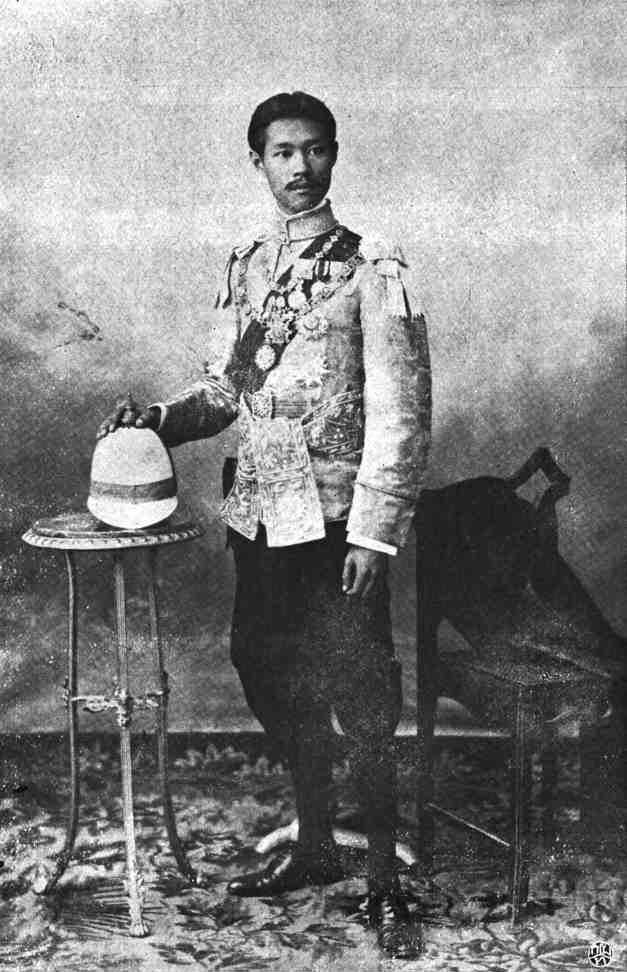

Director General of the Cultivation Department
- Born: 13 September 1882; Grand Palace; Bangkok, Siam
- Died: 11 November 1909 (aged 27); Bangkok, Siam
- Spouse: Princess Vanna Vilaya Kritakara
- Issue: Princess Banna Benkae Kritakara; Prince Baobenbadhana Benbadhana
- House: Benbadhana family (Chakri Dynasty)
- Father: Chulalongkorn (Rama V)
- Mother: Morakot Benyakul

Benbadhanabongse, Prince of Phichai (Thai: เพ็ญพัฒนพงศ์; RTGS: Phenphatthanaphong; 13 September 1882 – 11 November 1909) was a Prince of Siam, a member of the Siamese (later Thailand) royal family. He originated the House of Benbadhana (ราชสกุลเพ็ญพัฒน์). He was a son of Chulalongkorn, King Rama V of Siam.

== Early life and work ==
Prince Benbadhanabongse was born on 13 September 1882, in the compound of the Grand Palace, Bangkok. He was the 38th child of King Chulalongkorn, and his mother was The Noble Consort (Chao Chom Manda) Morakot Phenkul, daughter of Lord (Phraya) Mahindrasakdi Dhamrong and Dame (Thanpuying) Hunn Phenkul. He had an elder sister, Princess Chudharatana Rajakumari.

He studied agricultural studies in the United Kingdom in 1903, while he was only 19 years old. After graduating, he began working as the secretary officer in the Ministry of Education. In 1902, King Chulalongkorn promoted the country's silk-silverware and weaving industry. He hired Dr. Kametaro Toyama from the University of Tokyo to teach the Japanese practice of silk and weaving to Siamese students. King Chulalongkorn established a silk-weaving factory in the sub-district of Sala-Daeng, under the control of the Ministry of Education. Later on 30 September 1903, the ministry included the productive division, the division of animal husbandry, and the silk-weaving pillow station, created as the "Department of Silk Technicians". Prince Benbadhanabongse became the first director of the department.

The main responsibility of the Department of Silk Technicians the School of Sericulture, which was established in November 1903 at Dusit Palace. On 16 January 1904, there was another School of Sericulture in Pathum Wan, for the purpose of creating a specialist research and training of Thai employees. Later this school developed into the current Kasetsart University.

Prince Benbadhanabongse was given the royal title from his father as "Kromma Muen Phichai Mahintharodom", or translated as The Prince of Phichai on 2 October 1904. He was given the rank of Kromma Meun, the fifth level of the Krom ranks.

== Personal life ==
Prince Benbadhanabopngse was interested in Thai music instruments, being able to play almost every type of instrument. He created the Thai classical music band "Prince Ben's band". After returning from the United Kingdom, he visited Chiang Mai. He met the Chiang Mai princess Chomchuen of Chiang Mai, daughter of Prince Sambandhavongse Dharmalanka of Chiang Mai and Princess Ghamyon of Lamphun, and they began a relationship. Prince Benbadhanabongse requested the governor of Chiang Mai to negotiate with Prince Sambandhavongse about a marriage, but the proposal was rejected by Prince Sambandhavongse.

He began composing the song called Lao Duang Duen in loving memory to his loved one. He performed this song whenever he missed the Princess of Chiang Mai.

Later King Chulalongkorn prepared the marriage between the Prince and Princess Vanna Vilaya Kritakara, daughter of Krisdabhinihara, Prince Nares Voraridhi on 30 June 1903. The couple had two children;

- Princess Barnabenkhae Benbadhana (11 September 1905 – 1 July 1974) later relinquished the royal title, and married Mom Rajawongse Banluesakdi Kritakara, had a son and two daughters
- Prince Baobenbadhana Benbadhana (9 May 1906 – 10 January 1960) married Mom Luang Bochitra Patamasingha, had two sons.

Prince Benbadhanabongse died on 11 November 1909, at the age of 27.

== Royal decorations ==
- Knight of the Most Illustrious Order of the Royal House of Chakri (1904)
- Knight Grand Cross (First Class) of the Most Illustrious Order of Chula Chom Klao (1903)
- Knight Grand Cross (First Class) of the Most Noble Order of the Crown of Thailand (1908)
- Dushdi Mala Medal for Arts (1908)
- King Rama V Royal Cypher Medal, 2nd Class (1908)

== Ancestry ==
Ancestor of Prince Benbadhanabongse, Krom Meun Pichai Mahintarodom
Prince Benbadhanabongse, the Prince Pijaya Mahindrarodom	Father: Chulalongkorn, King Rama V of Siam	Paternal Grandfather: Mongkut, King Rama IV of Siam	Paternal Great-grandfather: Buddha Loetla Nabhalai, King Rama II of Siam
Prince Benbadhanabongse, the Prince Pijaya Mahindrarodom	Father: Chulalongkorn, King Rama V of Siam	Paternal Grandfather: Mongkut, King Rama IV of Siam	Paternal Great-grandmother: Queen Sri Suriyendra
Prince Benbadhanabongse, the Prince Pijaya Mahindrarodom	Father: Chulalongkorn, King Rama V of Siam	Paternal Grandmother: Queen Debsirindra	Paternal Great-grandfather: Prince Sirivongse, the Prince Matayabidaksa
Prince Benbadhanabongse, the Prince Pijaya Mahindrarodom	Father: Chulalongkorn, King Rama V of Siam	Paternal Grandmother: Queen Debsirindra	Paternal Great-grandmother: Mom Noi Sirivongs na Ayudhya
Prince Benbadhanabongse, the Prince Pijaya Mahindrarodom	Mother: Chao Chom Manda Morakot Phenkul	Maternal Grandfather: Phraya Mahindrasakdi Dhamrong	Maternal Great-grandfather: Lord (Khun) Chinda Pichitra
Prince Benbadhanabongse, the Prince Pijaya Mahindrarodom	Mother: Chao Chom Manda Morakot Phenkul	Maternal Grandfather: Phraya Mahindrasakdi Dhamrong	Maternal Great-grandmother: Mon Phenkul
Prince Benbadhanabongse, the Prince Pijaya Mahindrarodom	Mother: Chao Chom Manda Morakot Phenkul	Maternal Grandmother: Thanpuying Hun Phenkul	Maternal Great-grandfather: Phraya Nakornindra Ramanya
Prince Benbadhanabongse, the Prince Pijaya Mahindrarodom	Mother: Chao Chom Manda Morakot Phenkul	Maternal Grandmother: Thanpuying Hun Phenkul	Maternal Great-grandmother: unknown
