= Raphi Phatthanasak =

- Prince of Ratchaburi
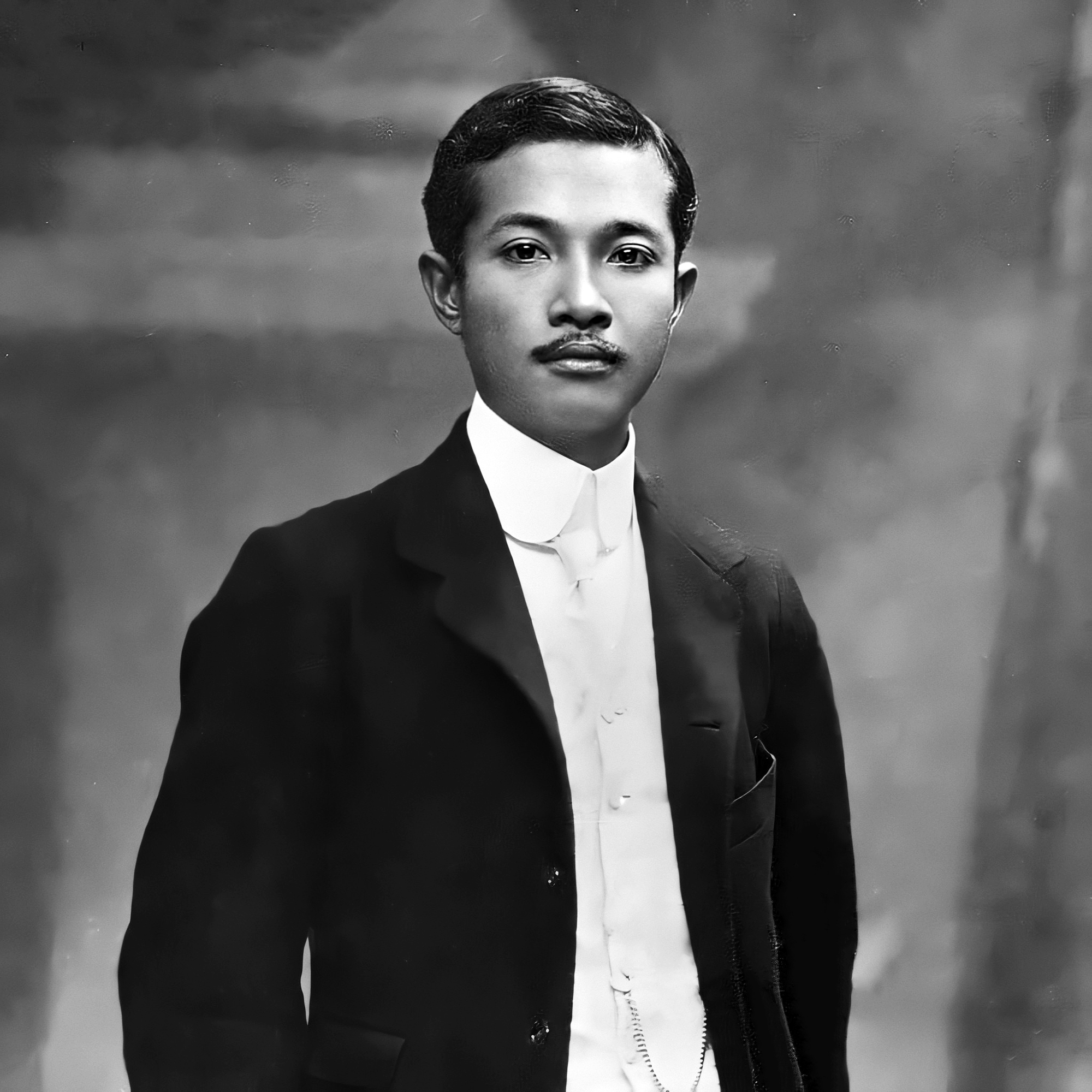
- Born: 21 October 1874; Grand Palace, Bangkok, Siam
- Died: 7 August 1920 (aged 45); Paris, France
- Spouse: Princess Orabhatra Prabai; Mom On Rabibadhana Na Ayudhya; Mom Duaeng Rabibadhana; Mom Rajawongse Sa-ang Pramoj
- Issue: 13 sons and daughters
Names
- His Royal Highness; Prince Rabibadhanasakdi
- House: Rabhibhat family (Chakri Dynasty)
- Father: Chulalongkorn (Rama V)
- Mother: Chao Chom Manda Talab

Prince Raphi Phatthanasak, Prince of Ratchaburi (Thai: รพีพัฒนศักดิ์; RTGS: Raphi Phatthanasak), (21 October 1874 – 7 August 1920) was a 14th son of king Chulalongkorn and Chao Chom manda Talab. He had one full sister, Princess Ajrabarni Rajkanya.

A key figure in Thai legal reform, he graduated from Faculty of Law, University of Oxford. In 1892, the Ministry of Justice was established and Prince Raphi was appointed as Head Minister to unify the judiciary. In 1897, he set up the first law school in Thailand. He also reorganized the Thai court system under the 1908 Law on Organization. During his tenure as the Minister of Justice, his attempts to increase the independence of the Thai judiciary from the executive led to tensions with the king's absolutist outlook. This would eventually culminate in his resignation in 1910, precipitated by a legal dispute with Prince Narathip Praphanphong over Narathip's play Phraya Raka. Following their mentor, 28 senior judges also resigned from the judiciary in a show of loyalty, though all but one were summoned by the king to resume their position. Prince Raphi would later return to the bureaucracy in the reign of King Vajiravudh, serving as the Minister of Agriculture.

Prince Raphi died in Paris on 7 August 1920 at 21:00. He died of prostate cancer and kidney complications at the age of 45 years, 9 months, 17 days. King Rama VI asked the Siamese ambassador to France to organize a royal cremation ceremony in Paris, in accordance with Prince Raphi's wishes. After that, Prince Kaiseang-raphi Rabhibhat came to pick up and summon the Royal Regiment of Prince Raphi Phatthanasak to Thailand on 1 December 1920.

== Family ==
Wives

1. HRH Princess Orabhatra Prabai Rabībadhana (née Chakrabandhu), daughter of HRH Prince Chaturonrasmi, the Prince Chakkrabatradipongse
2. Mom On Rabībadhana na Ayudhya
3. Mom Daeng Rabībadhana na Ayudhya
4. Mom Rajawongse Sa-eng Rabībadhana (née Pramoja)

== Ancestry ==
Ancestors of Raphi Phatthanasak
Raphi Phatthanasak	Father: Chulalongkorn, King Rama V of Siam	Paternal Grandfather: Mongkut, King Rama IV of Siam	Paternal Great-grandfather: Buddha Loetla Nabhalai, King Rama II of Siam
Raphi Phatthanasak	Father: Chulalongkorn, King Rama V of Siam	Paternal Grandfather: Mongkut, King Rama IV of Siam	Paternal Great-grandmother: Queen Sri Suriyendra
Raphi Phatthanasak	Father: Chulalongkorn, King Rama V of Siam	Paternal Grandmother: Queen Debsirindra	Paternal Great-grandfather: Prince Sirivongse, the Prince Matayabidaksa
Raphi Phatthanasak	Father: Chulalongkorn, King Rama V of Siam	Paternal Grandmother: Queen Debsirindra	Paternal Great-grandmother: Mom Noi Sirivongs na Ayudhya
Raphi Phatthanasak	Mother: Chao Chom Manda Talab Ketutat	Maternal Grandfather: Phraya Viangnai Narubal (Rhung Ketutat)	Maternal Great-grandfather: Phraya Bejra Bijaya (Noo Ketutat)
Raphi Phatthanasak	Mother: Chao Chom Manda Talab Ketutat	Maternal Grandfather: Phraya Viangnai Narubal (Rhung Ketutat)	Maternal Great-grandmother: unknown
Raphi Phatthanasak	Mother: Chao Chom Manda Talab Ketutat	Maternal Grandmother: unknown	Maternal Great-grandfather: unknown
Raphi Phatthanasak	Mother: Chao Chom Manda Talab Ketutat	Maternal Grandmother: unknown	Maternal Great-grandmother: unknown
