= Srivilailaksana =

Princess of Suphanburi (1868–1904)

Srivalailaksana
- Princess of Suphanburi
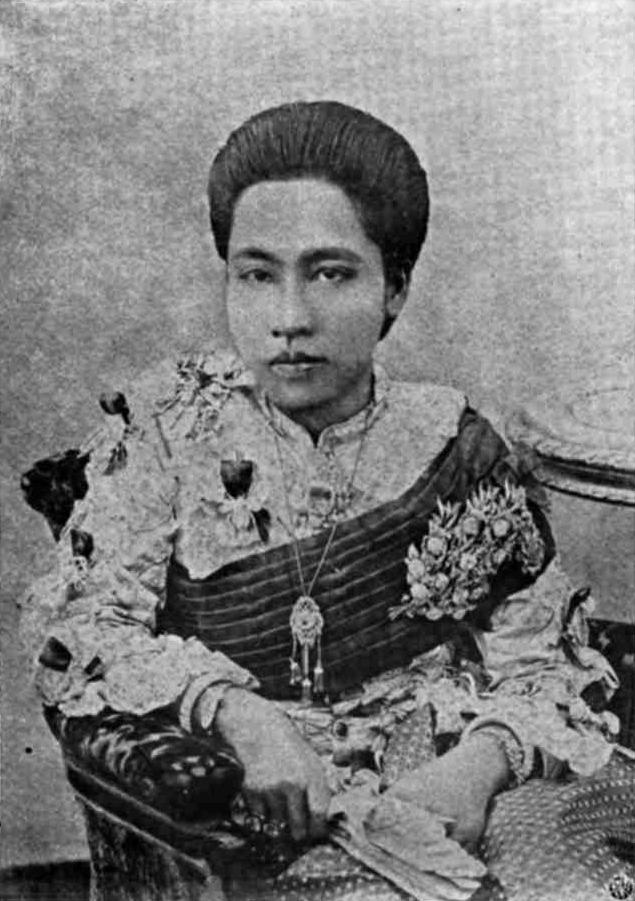
- Born: 24 July 1868; Grand Palace; Bangkok, Siam
- Died: 26 October 1904 (aged 36); Bangkok, Siam
Names
- Srivilailaksana Sundornsakdi Galyavadi
- House: Chakri dynasty
- Father: Chulalongkorn (Rama V)
- Mother: Pae Bunnag

Srivilailaksana, Princess of Suphanburi (Thai: ศรีวิไลยลักษณ์; RTGS: Siwilailak; 24 July 1868 – 26 October 1904), was the Princess of Siam (later Thailand). A member of Siamese royal family, she was a daughter of Chulalongkorn, King Rama V of Siam, born while her father was the heir-apparent. Her father had great trust in her and referred to her as My greatest-trusted lovely daughter.

Srivilailaksana was one of the vice-presidents of the Red Unalom Society (later Thai Red Cross Society) with the other princesses.

She received the royal title Krom at the 4th level Krom Khun Suphan Bhakavadi (translated as the Princess of Suphanburi; Thai: กรมขุนสุพรรณภาควดี). She died a year after receiving the royal title. The Royal Cremation was created at Nivetthammapravat Temple, in the area of Bang Pa-In Royal Palace.

== Birth ==
Princess Srivilailak was the eldest daughter of King Chulalongkorn (Rama V) the Great of Siam and Chao Chom Manda Pae Bunnag (later elevated into Lady (Chao Khun Phra) Prayuravongse), daughter of Lord (Chao Phraya) Suravongs Vaiyavadhana (son of Somdet Chao Phraya Borom Maha Si Suriyawongse). She had two younger sisters;

- Princess Suvabaktra Vilayabanna (2 May 1873 – 30 July 1930)
- Princess Bandhavanna Varobhas (25 May 1875 – 15 May 1891)

She was born while his father held the title of heir-apparent to the Siamese throne; he was Prince Chulalongkorn, the Prince Pinit Prajanadh and her mother was Mom Pae. She was born outside the Grand Palace, because of an ancient tradition: Her mother was not allowed to give birth inside the palace until the prince succeeded to the throne. The privilege of birth in the Grand Palace was reserved for children of the King. Prince Chulalongkorn prepared the Nanda Utayan Garden house near the grand palace for Mom Pae to reside in.

When Mom Pae seven months pregnant, she gave birth prematurely. The child was still in the belly, so the doctor understood that the royal child died. So the doctor put the belly in the solid pot, sinking in the river by the ancient tradition. But before sinking, Mom Pae's father, Phraya Suravongs Vaiyavadhana wanted to know the baby was the prince or princess. So he ripped the belly out, he surprisingly found the baby was breathing, and the baby was the princess. So they helped taking care of the princess very well. Then the mother and the princess moved to Suan Kularb House, in the area of Grand Palace.

After she was born, she was held the title Mom Chao and the style of Serene Highness. And when her father succeed the Siamese Throne from her grandfather, King Mongkut (Rama IV), she was elevated her title into Princess and style of Royal Highness. She was given the full name from her father as Srivilailaksana Sundornsakdi Galyavadi (Thai: ศรีวิไลยลักษณ์ สุนทรศักดิกัลยาวดี). Her mother, Mom Pae, was elevated into Chao Chom Manda.

== Royal responsibilities ==
She took care of her step-siblings, especially the young princesses who were approaching adulthood. In palace tradition, these young princesses had to be carefully watched over.

For the royal duties, she was one of the executive vice-president of the Red Unalom Society, the major humanitarian organisation (later Thai Red Cross Society), founded by Queen Savang Vadhana as maternal patron. And Queen Saovabha Phongsri was appointed the first president, and Thanpuying Plien Phasakoravongs acted as the society secretary. She worked as the executive vice-president with the other princesses;

- Queen Sukhumala Marasri
- Princess Suddha Dibyaratana, Princess Sri Ratanakosindra
- Princess Chandra Saradavara, Princess of Phichit
- Princess Yaovamalaya Narumala, Princess of Sawankalok
- Princess Ubolratana Narinaga, Princess of Akaravorarajgalya
- Princess Saisavali Bhiromya, Princess Suddhasininat of Piyamaharaj Padivaradda
- The Noble Consort (Chao Chom Manda) Kesorn of King Chulalongkorn

== Royal title ==
On 10 January 1903, during the 35th anniversary of King Chulalongkorn's accession to the throne, she was awarded the royal title Krom Khun Suphan Bhakvadi (Princess of Suphanburi). Due to her standing as one of the King's most trusted daughters, she received the fourth-level Krom rank (Krom Khun), rather than the Krom Muen rank typically granted to royal children.

== Death ==
Princess Srivilailaksana suffered from an illness and died on 26 October 1904, at age 36. As her body lay in state within Aisawan Dhiphya-Asana Pavilion, in the compound of the Bang Pa-In Royal Palace, Ayutthaya Province mourners thronged to pay their final respects. In her funeral ceremony, her half-sister, Princess Chandra Saradavara, Princess of Phichit suffered from illness and died on 21 February 1905, while going to pay respect to her at the Bang Pa-In Royal Palace.

== Funeral ==
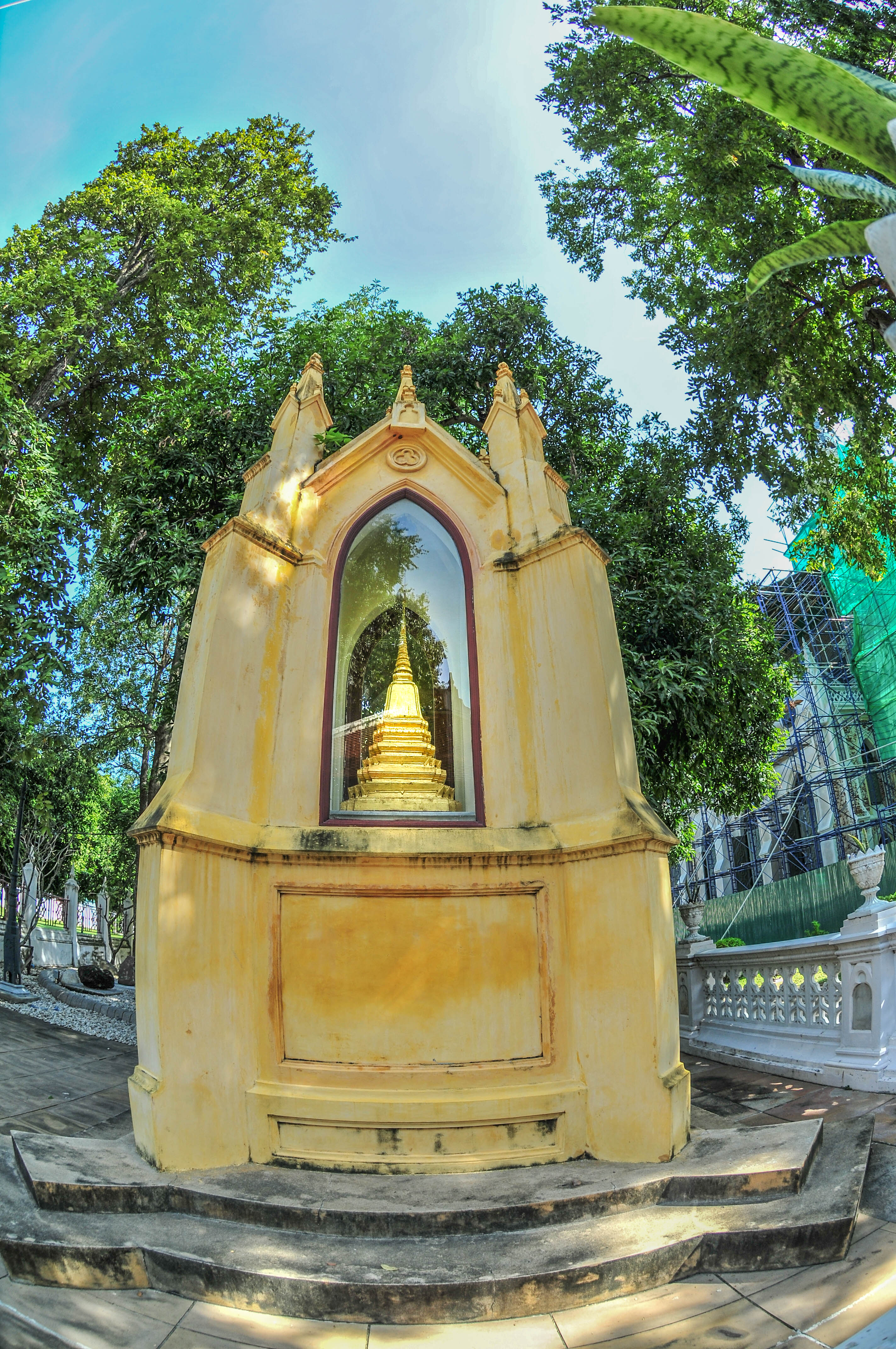
Stupa of Princess Srivilailaksana, Wat Niwet Thammaprawat, Bang Pa-in district, Ayutthaya Province

After she died in her residence in the area of Grand Palace. King Chulalongkorn ordered to officers, laid her body in Sutthai Sawan Prasat Throne Hall, in the compound of the Grand Palace. Until 14 February 1905, her body was moved to Bang Pa-In Royal Palace by moving from Sutthai Sawan Prasat, through Sakdichaiyasit Gate, straight to Samsen's train station. And then, the train moved through Ayutthaya Province, where King Chulalongkorn was there one day before the princess' body reached Ayutthaya.

Her body was laid in state in Aisawan Dhiphya-Asana Pavilion, a pavilion constructed in the middle of a pond, in the compound of the Bang Pa-In Royal Palace. The royal funeral tradition dates back to the Ayutthaya period is influenced by thousand-year-old India's Hindu traditions that treat kings as incarnations or descendants of deities and Buddhism's merit-making ceremonies. The three-day funeral ceremony and ritual officially started on 17 February 1905. The Royal Cremation ceremony was created at Nivetthammapravat Temple, in the area of the palace, performed by King Chulalongkorn, and mourned by every member of the Royal family. In the next morning, King Chulalongkorn collected his daughter's ashes and transferred into the stupa near the temple.

== Titles ==
- Her Serene Highness Princess Srivilailaksana (Mom Chao Srivilailak): 24 July 1868 – 1 October 1868
- Her Royal Highness Princess Srivilailaksana (Phra Chao Boromwongse Ther Phra Ong Chao Srivilailak): 1 October 1868 – 10 January 1903
- Her Royal Highness Princess Srivilailaksana Sudornsakdi Galyavadi, the Princess of Suphanburi (Phra Chao Boromwongse Ther Phra Ong Chao Srivilailak Sunthornsak Kalayawadi Krom Khun Suphan Phakvadi): 10 January 1903 – 26 October 1904

== Royal decorations ==
- Dame of The Most Illustrious Order of the Royal House of Chakri: received 10 December 1882
- Dame Cross of the Most Illustrious Order of Chula Chom Klao (First class): received 26 November 1893
- King Rama V's Royal Cypher Medal

== Ancestry ==
Ancestor of Princess Srivilailaksana, the Princess of Suphanburi
Princess Srivilailaksana	Father: Chulalongkorn, King Rama V of Siam	Paternal Grandfather: Mongkut, King Rama IV of Siam	Paternal Great-grandfather: Buddha Loetla Nabhalai, King Rama II of Siam
Princess Srivilailaksana	Father: Chulalongkorn, King Rama V of Siam	Paternal Grandfather: Mongkut, King Rama IV of Siam	Paternal Great-grandmother: Queen Sri Suriyendra
Princess Srivilailaksana	Father: Chulalongkorn, King Rama V of Siam	Paternal Grandmother: Queen Debsirindra	Paternal Great-grandfather: Prince Sirivongse, the Prince Matayabidaksa
Princess Srivilailaksana	Father: Chulalongkorn, King Rama V of Siam	Paternal Grandmother: Queen Debsirindra	Paternal Great-grandmother: Mom Noi Sirivongs na Ayudhya
Princess Srivilailaksana	Mother: Chao Chom Manda Pae Bunnag	Maternal Grandfather: Chao Phraya Suravongs Vaiyavadhana	Maternal Great-grandfather: Somdet Chao Phraya Borom Maha Sri Suriyawongse
Princess Srivilailaksana	Mother: Chao Chom Manda Pae Bunnag	Maternal Grandfather: Chao Phraya Suravongs Vaiyavadhana	Maternal Great-grandmother: Klin Bunnag
Princess Srivilailaksana	Mother: Chao Chom Manda Pae Bunnag	Maternal Grandmother: Im Bunnag	Maternal Great-grandfather: unknown
Princess Srivilailaksana	Mother: Chao Chom Manda Pae Bunnag	Maternal Grandmother: Im Bunnag	Maternal Great-grandmother: unknown
