= Suvabaktra Vilayabanna =

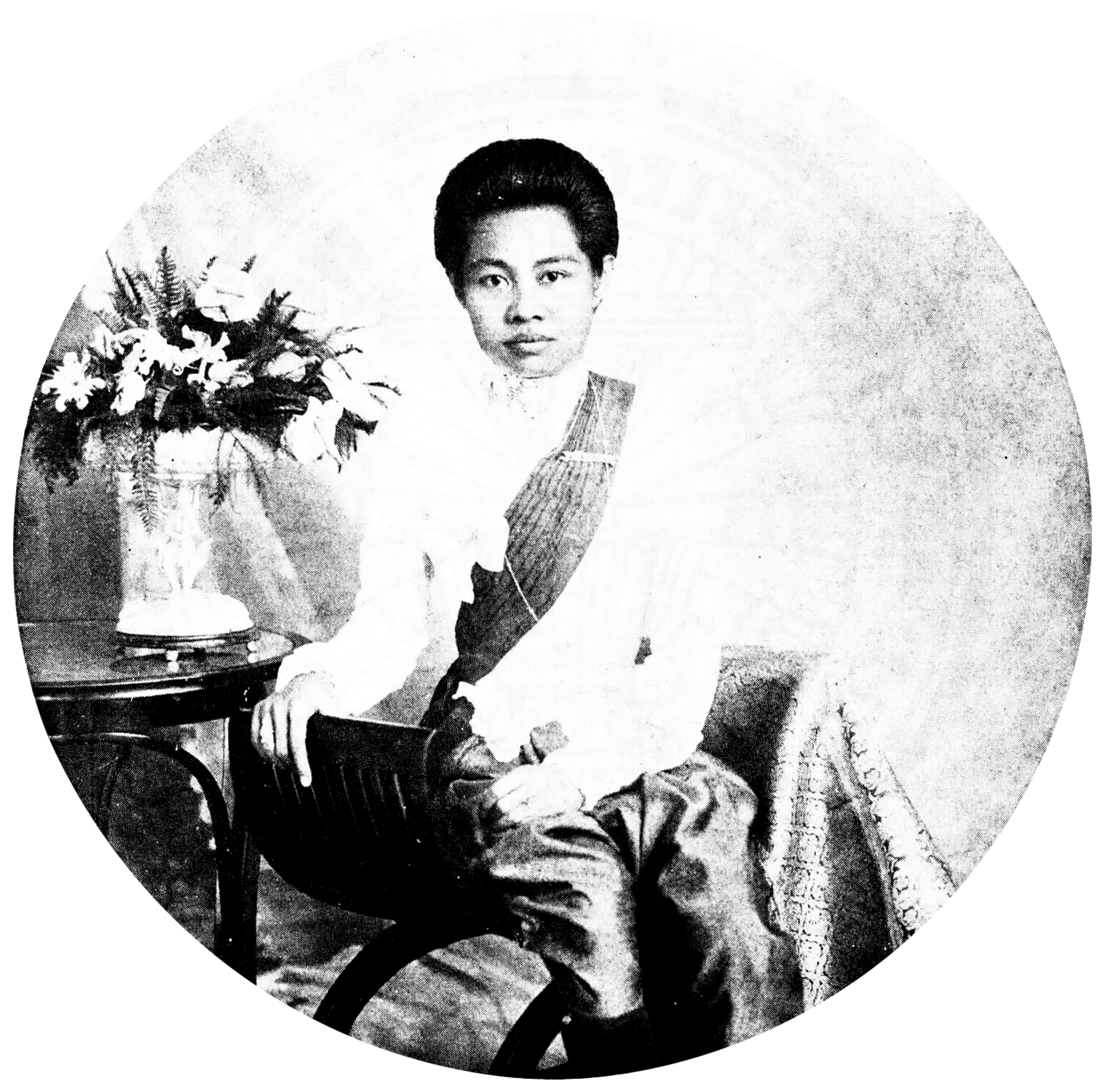
- Born: 2 May 1873; Grand Palace; Bangkok, Siam
- Died: 30 July 1930 (aged 57); Bangkok, Siam
Names
- Suvabaktra Vilayabanna
- House: Chakri Dynasty
- Father: Chulalongkorn (Rama V)
- Mother: Chao Chom Manda Pae Bunnag

Princess Suvabaktra Vilayabanna or Phra Chao Boromwongse Ther Phra Ong Chao Suvabaktra Vilayabanna (RTGS: Suwaphak Wilaiphan) (Thai: พระเจ้าบรมวงศ์เธอ พระองค์เจ้าสุวพักตร์วิไลยพรรณ) (2 May 1873 – 30 July 1930), was a Princess of Siam (later Thailand), the daughter of Chulalongkorn, King Rama V of Siam.

Her mother was Chao Chom Manda Pae Bunnag (later elevated to Lady (Chao Khun Phra) Prayuravongse), daughter of Chaophraya Surawong Waiyawat (son of Somdet Chao Phraya Borom Maha Si Suriyawongse). She had one elder sister and one younger sister:

- Princess Srivalailaksana, the Princess of Suphanburi (24 July 1868 – 26 October 1904)
- Princess Bandhavanna Varobhas (25 May 1875 – 15 May 1891)

Vilayabanna died on 30 July 1930, at the age of 57.

== Royal Decorations ==
- Dame Cross of the Most Illustrious Order of Chula Chom Klao (First class): received 25 November 1900

== Ancestry ==
Ancestors of Princess Suvabaktra Vilayabanna
Princess Suvabaktra Vilayabanna	Father: Chulalongkorn, King Rama V of Siam	Paternal Grandfather: Mongkut, King Rama IV of Siam	Paternal Great-grandfather: Buddha Loetla Nabhalai, King Rama II of Siam
Princess Suvabaktra Vilayabanna	Father: Chulalongkorn, King Rama V of Siam	Paternal Grandfather: Mongkut, King Rama IV of Siam	Paternal Great-grandmother: Queen Sri Suriyendra
Princess Suvabaktra Vilayabanna	Father: Chulalongkorn, King Rama V of Siam	Paternal Grandmother: Queen Debsirindra	Paternal Great-grandfather: Prince Sirivongse, the Prince Matayabidaksa
Princess Suvabaktra Vilayabanna	Father: Chulalongkorn, King Rama V of Siam	Paternal Grandmother: Queen Debsirindra	Paternal Great-grandmother: Mom Noi Sirivongs na Ayudhya
Princess Suvabaktra Vilayabanna	Mother: Chao Chom Manda Pae Bunnag	Maternal Grandfather: Chaophraya Surawong Waiyawat	Maternal Great-grandfather: Somdet Chao Phraya Borom Maha Sri Suriyawongse
Princess Suvabaktra Vilayabanna	Mother: Chao Chom Manda Pae Bunnag	Maternal Grandfather: Chaophraya Surawong Waiyawat	Maternal Great-grandmother: Klin Bunnag
Princess Suvabaktra Vilayabanna	Mother: Chao Chom Manda Pae Bunnag	Maternal Grandmother: Im Bunnag	Maternal Great-grandfather: unknown
Princess Suvabaktra Vilayabanna	Mother: Chao Chom Manda Pae Bunnag	Maternal Grandmother: Im Bunnag	Maternal Great-grandmother: unknown
