= Boonlua Debyasuvarn =

Thai writer, educator and civil servant

Professor Mom Luang Boonlua Debyasuvarn MPCh MWM PChW
- บุญเหลือ เทพยสุวรรณ
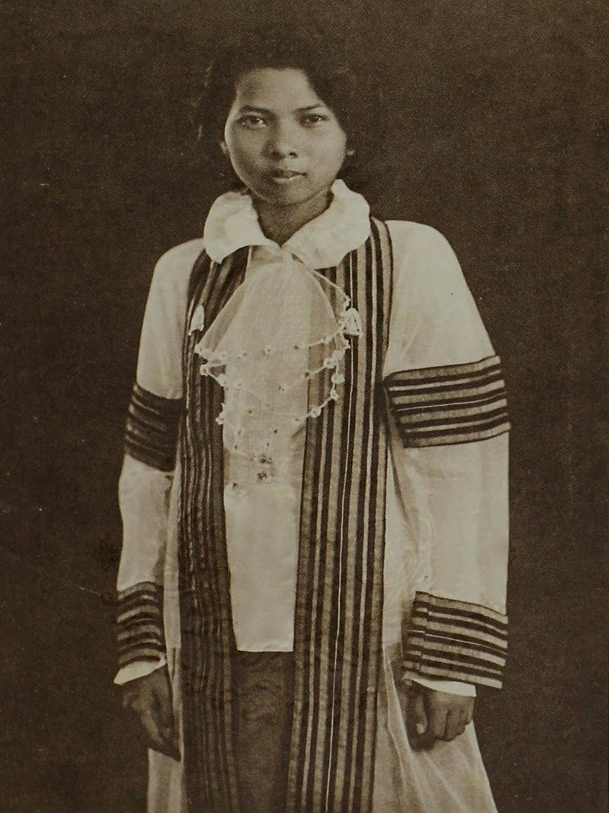
- Born: 23 December 1911; Phra Nakhon, Siam
- Died: June 7, 1982 (aged 70)
- Occupations: Novelists, academic
- Spouse: Chom Debyasuvarn

Mom Luang Boonlua Debyasuvarn (Note: Mom Luang is a title that indicates that she was a great-great-grandchild of a king.) née Kunchon (Thai: บุญเหลือ เทพยสุวรรณ, RTGS: Bunluea Thepphayasuwan; December 13, 1911 – June 7, 1982), writing under the pen name Boonlua, was a Thai writer, educator and civil servant. She is considered to have been one of Thailand's most important educators during a crucial phase of that country's modernization.

== Biography ==
The youngest child of Chao Phraya Thewet, a high ranking official who had 32 children, and the only child of Mom Nual, a classical Thai dancer, she was born in Bangkok and was educated at a Catholic convent primary school there, at a convent secondary school in Penang and then earned her secondary school certificate at Saint Mary’s S.P.G School in Bangkok. She received a BA in Thai language and literature at Chulalongkorn University in 1936 and an MA in education from the University of Minnesota in 1950.

After her graduation from Chulalongkorn University, she entered public service. She later became a teacher of literature and then an educational administrator in the Ministry of Education. After completing her master's degree which had been funded by a scholarship, she returned to Thailand. She retired from public service in 1970; around the same time, she married a doctor. Boonlua also began writing, producing five novels. She published a number of essays on Thai literature and is thought to have established the basis for modern Thai literary criticism. Some of Boonlua's work has been translated into English and incorporated into a number of comparative studies of contemporary Southeast Asian writing. She also translated English stories into Thai and Thai literature into English.

In 1968, she was tasked with founding the Faculty of Fine Arts at the Sanam Chandra Palace Campus of Silpakorn University.

Her sister M.L. Buppha Kunchon Nimmanhemin, also a novelist, wrote under the name Dō̜kmai Sot.

== Royal decorations ==
- 1968 – Commander (Third Class) of the Most Exalted Order of the White Elephant
- 1954 – Commander (Third Class) of the Most Noble Order of the Crown of Thailand
- 1971 – Companion (Third Class) of the Most Illustrious Order of Chula Chom Klao

== Selected works ==
- Thutiyawiset, novel (1968)
- Suratnari, novel (The Land of Women) (1972)
- Sneh Plai Jwak, novella (The Enchanted Cooking Spoon)
