= House of Sundarakul na Jolburi =

House of Sundarakul na Jolburi ราชสกุลสุนทรกุล ณ ชลบุรี
- Current region: Bangkok
- Origin: Chonburi, Thailand
- Founded: 1782
- Founder: Reuang, the Prince Sundarabhubet
- Titles: Prince of Siam (1782–1892)
- Connected families: House of Chakri; House of Uraibongse
- Cadet branches: House of Sundornmanukij

Sundarakul na Jolburi (Thai: สุนทรกุล ณ ชลบุรี) is a Thai family which traces its ancestry to His Highness prince Reuang, The Prince Sundarabhubet or Krom Khun (prince of the second class) Sundarabhubet (กรมขุนสุนทรภูเบศร์) of Siam.

His Highness prince Reuang, The Prince Sundarabhubet was a Chonburi-commoner by birth, later elevated to princely status by King Phutthayotfa Chulalok (Rama I)'s royal command. He did not have royal blood, but became sworn brothers with the Front Palace Prince Maha Sura Singhanat, the king's younger brother, hence the royal grant of the Thai nobiliary particle "na". The family name was one of many formally granted by King Vajiravudh, (Rama VI, r. 1910–1925.)

== Royal members of "Sundarakul na Jolburi" family ==
- His Highness Prince Reuang, The Prince Sundarabhubet (Thai: พระองค์เจ้าเรือง กรมขุนสุนทรภูเบศร์)
- Chao Chom Manda Kheow Sundarakul na Jolburi, Royal Concubine of King Nangklao (Rama III) (Thai: เจ้าจอมมารดาเขียว สุนทรกุล ณ ชลบุรี)
- Mom Luang Chab Sundarakul (Thai: หม่อมหลวงจาบ สุนทรกุล)

== See also ==
- Chonburi Province, Thailand
- Thai royal ranks and titles
