= Dokmai Sot =

Thai novelist

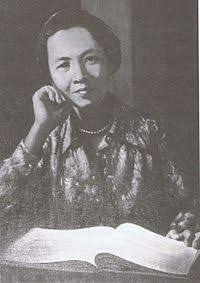
หม่อมหลวงบุปผา นิมมานเหมินท์

Mom Luang Buppha Nimmanhemin née Kunchon (Note: Mom Luang is a title that indicates that she was a great-great-grandchild of a king.) (1905 – 1963), writing under the pen name Dokmai Sot, was the most important Thai woman novelist in the period before World War II.

The second youngest child of Chao Phraya Thewet, a high-ranking official who had 32 children, she was educated at home and at a Catholic convent primary school in Bangkok. When she was five years old, her mother Mom Malai left Chao Phraya Thewet to marry a Western foreigner; Dō̜kmai Sot remained with her father. Her earlier novels were romances but her later work, set in the world of the Thai elite, deals with moral issues in a changing world, based on Buddhist values. In her view, a person's quality was not measured by their social status but by their morality as reflected in their behaviour. She also wrote a number of short stories which are less known than her novels.

In 1954, she married the Thai politician Sukich Nimmanhemin.

Her sister Boonlua Kunchon Thepyasuwan, also a novelist, wrote under the name Boonlua.

== Selected works ==
- Phu Di (A person of good quality), novel (1938)
