= Kheow Sundarakul na Jolburi =

- Royal Concubine of Siam
- Born: - -
- Died: Bangkok, Siam
- Spouse: Nangklao (Rama III)
- Issue: 1 son, 1 daughter
Names
- Chao Chom Manda Kheow Sundarakul na Jolburi(Royal Concubine of King Rama III of Siam)
- House: Sundarakul na Jolburi
- Father: His Highness Prince Reuang, The Prince Sundarabhubet

Kheow Sundarakul na Jolburi (complete title Chao Chom Manda Kheow Sundarakul na Jolburi, Royal Concubine of King Nangklao "Rama III" of Siam), (Thai: เจ้าจอมมารดาเขียว สุนทรกุล ณ ชลบุรี) was a daughter of His Highness Prince Reuang, the Prince Sundarabhubet(Thai: พระองค์เจ้าเรือง กรมขุนสุนทรภูเบศร์), but she did not inherit a title of princess from her prince father.

She moved to the Grand Palace to be a royal Concubine of King Nangklao with the royal title Chao Chom (Royal Concubine). She gave birth to a prince and a princess.

== See also ==
- Sundarakul na Jolburi
