= Bandhavanna Varobhas =

Princess of Siam, daughter of Chulalongkorn

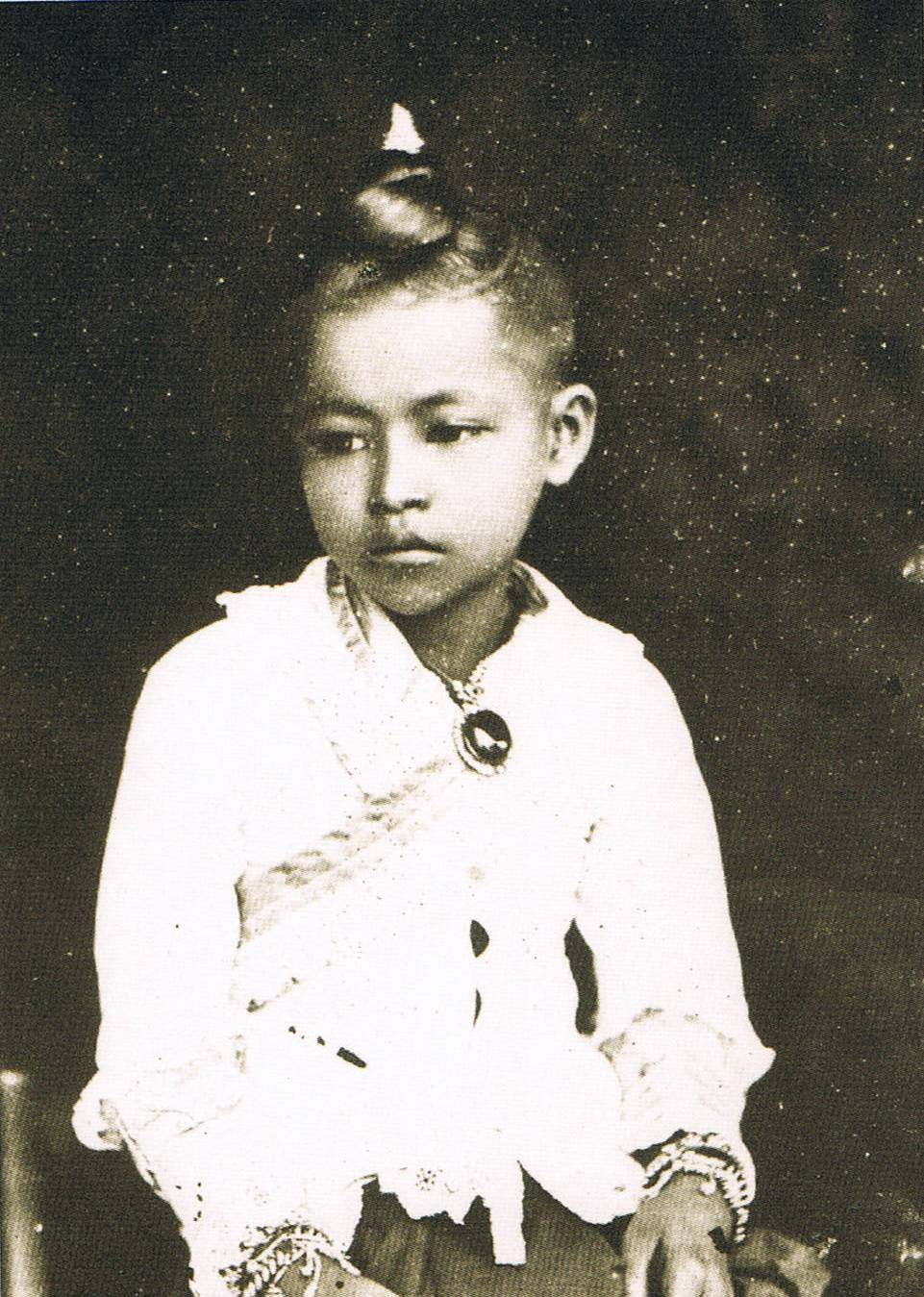
- Born: 25 May 1875; Grand Palace; Bangkok, Siam
- Died: 15 May 1891 (aged 15); Bangkok, Siam
- Bandhavanna Varobhas
- House: Chakri dynasty
- Father: Chulalongkorn (Rama V)
- Mother: Chao Chom Manda Pae Bunnag

Princess Bandhavanna Varobhas or Phra Chao Boromwongse Ther Phra Ong Chao Bandhavanna Varobhas (RTGS: Banthawan Warophat; Thai: พระเจ้าบรมวงศ์เธอ พระองค์เจ้าบัณฑวรรณวโรภาษ; 25 May 1875 – 15 May 1891), was a Princess of Siam (later Thailand). She was a member of the Siamese royal family. She was a daughter of Chulalongkorn, King Rama V of Siam.

Her mother was Chao Chom Manda Pae Bunnag (later elevated into Lady (Chao Khun Phra) Prayuravongse), daughter of Lord (Chao Phraya) Suravongs Vaiyavadhana (son of Somdet Chao Phraya Borom Maha Si Suriyawongse). She had 2 elder full sisters:

- Princess Srivalailaksana, the Princess of Suphanburi (24 July 1868 – 26 October 1904)
- Princess Suvabaktra Vilayabanna (2 May 1873 – 30 July 1930)

Princess Bandhavanna Varobhas died on 15 May 1891 at age 15 years, 11 months.

== Ancestry ==
Ancestor of Princess Bandhavanna Varobhas
| Princess Bandhavanna Varobhas | Father: Chulalongkorn, King Rama V of Siam | Paternal Grandfather: Mongkut, King Rama IV of Siam | Paternal Great-grandfather: Buddha Loetla Nabhalai, King Rama II of Siam |
| Princess Bandhavanna Varobhas | Father: Chulalongkorn, King Rama V of Siam | Paternal Grandfather: Mongkut, King Rama IV of Siam | Paternal Great-grandmother: Queen Sri Suriyendra |
| Princess Bandhavanna Varobhas | Father: Chulalongkorn, King Rama V of Siam | Paternal Grandmother: Queen Debsirindra | Paternal Great-grandfather: Prince Sirivongse, the Prince Matayabidaksa |
| Princess Bandhavanna Varobhas | Father: Chulalongkorn, King Rama V of Siam | Paternal Grandmother: Queen Debsirindra | Paternal Great-grandmother: Mom Noi Sirivongs na Ayudhya |
| Princess Bandhavanna Varobhas | Mother: Chao Chom Manda Pae Bunnag | Maternal Grandfather: Chao Phraya Suravongs Vaiyavadhana | Maternal Great-grandfather: Somdet Chao Phraya Borom Maha Sri Suriyawongse |
| Princess Bandhavanna Varobhas | Mother: Chao Chom Manda Pae Bunnag | Maternal Grandfather: Chao Phraya Suravongs Vaiyavadhana | Maternal Great-grandmother: Klin Bunnag |
| Princess Bandhavanna Varobhas | Mother: Chao Chom Manda Pae Bunnag | Maternal Grandmother: Im Bunnag | Maternal Great-grandfather: unknown |
| Princess Bandhavanna Varobhas | Mother: Chao Chom Manda Pae Bunnag | Maternal Grandmother: Im Bunnag | Maternal Great-grandmother: unknown |
