= Bang Pa-In Royal Palace =

Thai royal palace complex

Bang Pa-In Royal Palace พระราชวังบางปะอิน
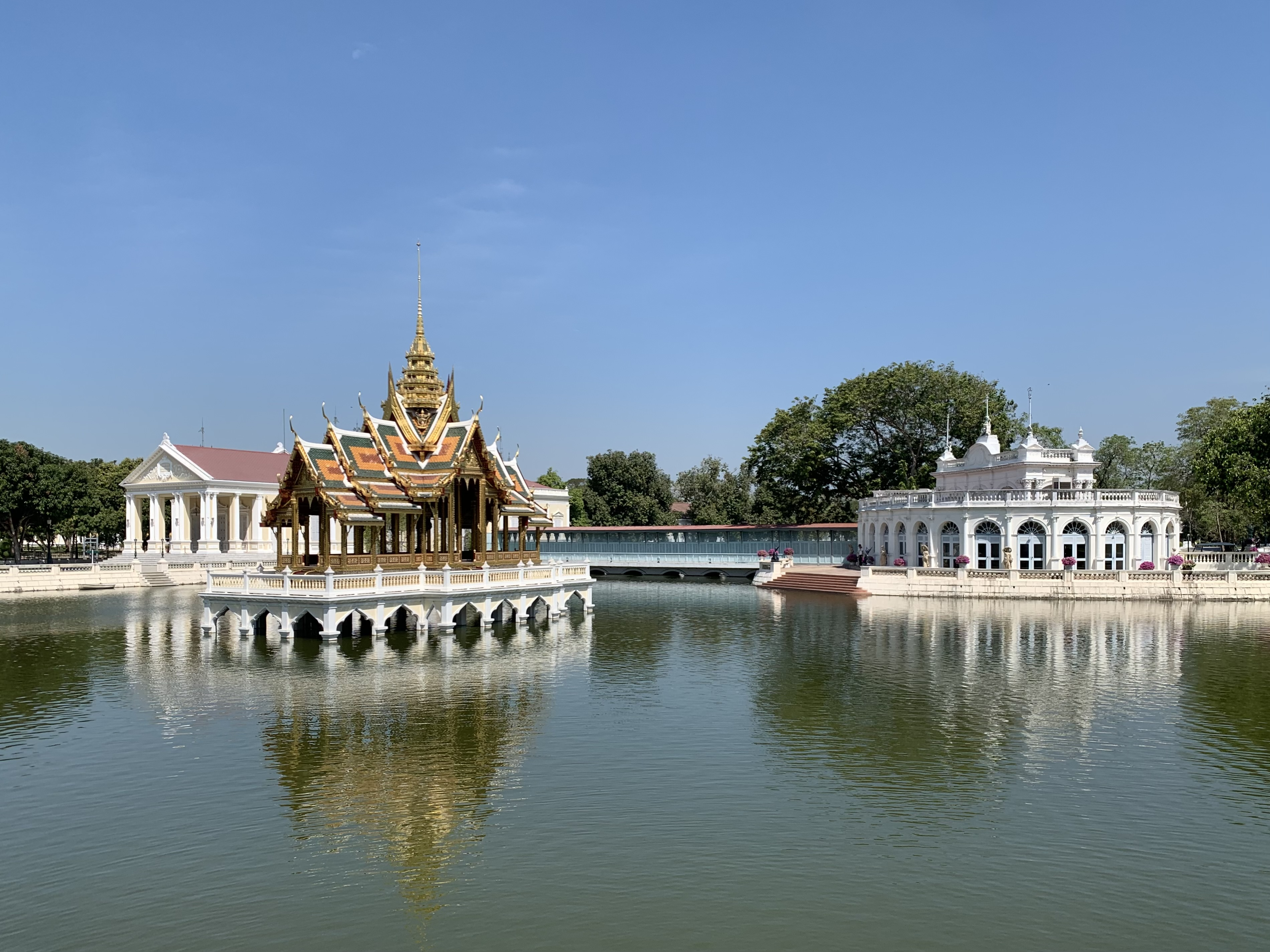
- Some of the buildings in the palace complex; from left to right: Woraphat Phiman Throne Hall (Note: Thai: พระที่นั่งวรภาสพิมาน; rendered on the palace's printed map as "Phra Thinang (Note: Thai: พระที่นั่ง; lit. 'royal seat', means "throne hall") Woraphat Phiman"), Aisawan Thipphaya-At Pavilion (Note: Thai: พระที่นั่งไอศวรรย์ทิพยอาสน์; RTGS: Aisawan Thipphaya-at; from Sanskrit "Ishvāraya Divya Āsna"; or rendered on the palace's printed map as "Phra Thinang Aisawan Thiphya-art"), Saowarot Bridge (Note: Thai: สะพานเสาวรส, RTGS: saphan saowarot; rendered on the palace's printed map as "Saovarod Bridge"), and Thewarat Khanlai Gate (Note: Thai: ประตูเทวราชครรไล; rendered on the palace's printed map as "Devaraj Kunlai Gate")

- Location within Thailand

General information
- Location: Bang Pa-in, Ayutthaya, Thailand
- Coordinates: 14°13′57″N 100°34′45″E
- Construction started: 1632

Website
- www.royaloffice.th

Bang Pa-In Royal Palace (Thai: พระราชวังบางปะอิน), also known as the Summer Palace (Thai: พระราชวังฤดูร้อน), is a palace complex formerly used by the Thai kings. It lies beside the Chao Phraya River in tambon Ban Len, Bang Pa-in District, Phra Nakhon Si Ayutthaya Province in Thailand.

== History ==
King Prasat Thong constructed the original complex in 1632, but it fell into disuse and became overgrown in the late 18th and early 19th centuries, until King Mongkut began to restore the site in the mid-19th century. Most of the present buildings were constructed between 1872 and 1889 by Mongkut's son and successor King Chulalongkorn.

== Buildings ==
Amidst vast gardens and landscaping stand the following buildings: Wehart Chamrun (Note: Thai: พระที่นั่งเวหาศน์จำรูญ, RTGS: we hat chamrun, or "Phra Thinang Wehart Chamrun" on the palace's printed map) (Heavenly Light), a Chinese-style royal palace and throne room; the Warophat Phiman (Excellent and Shining Heavenly Abode), a royal residence; Ho Withun Thasana (Sages' Lookout), a brightly painted lookout tower; and the Aisawan Thiphya-Art (Divine Seat of Personal Freedom), a pavilion constructed in the middle of a pond and Wat Niwet Thammaprawat, a royal temple of the palace.

The palace remains largely open to visitors.

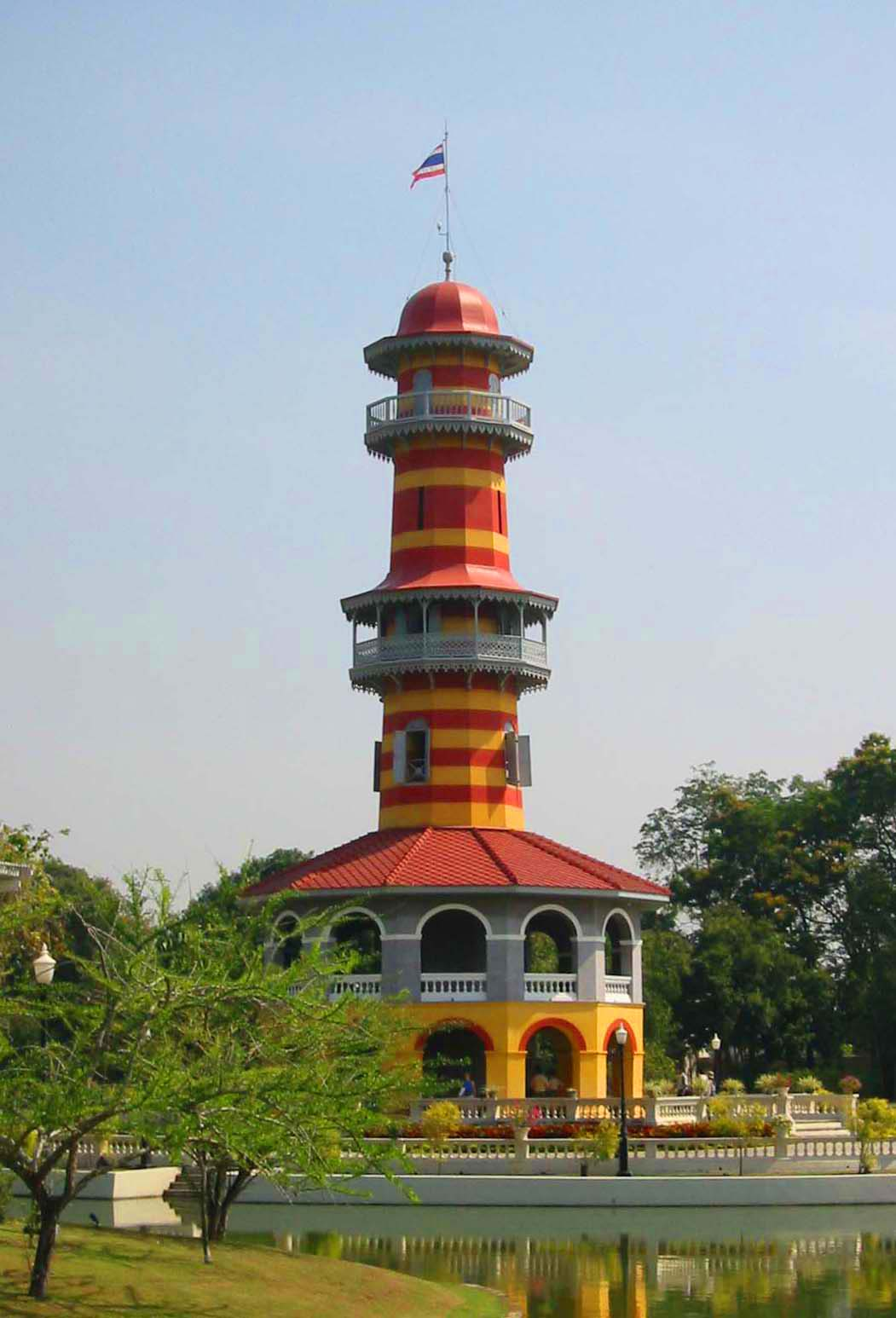
Ho Withun Thasana, or Sages' Lookout

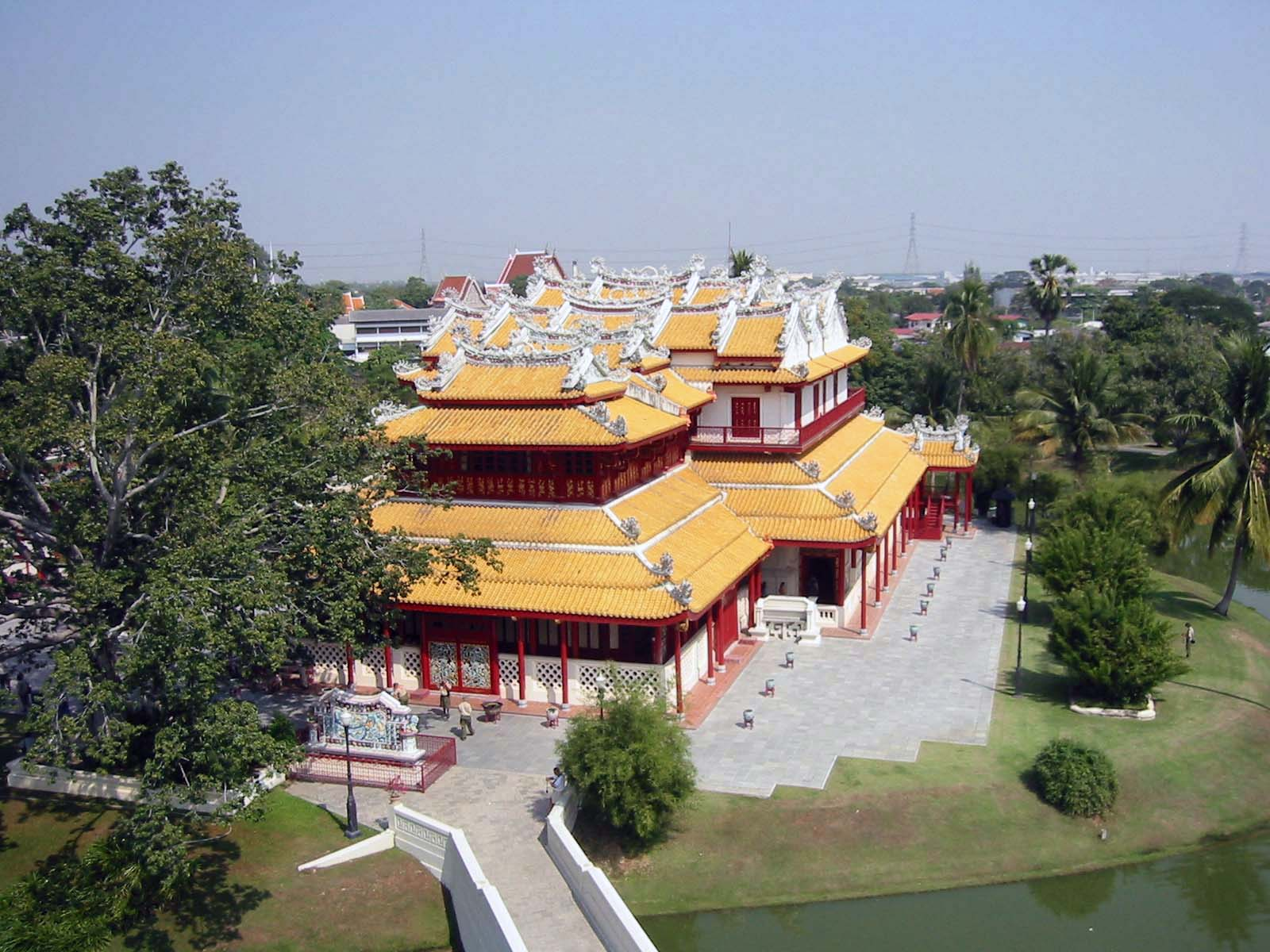
Wehart Chamrun, or Heavenly Light

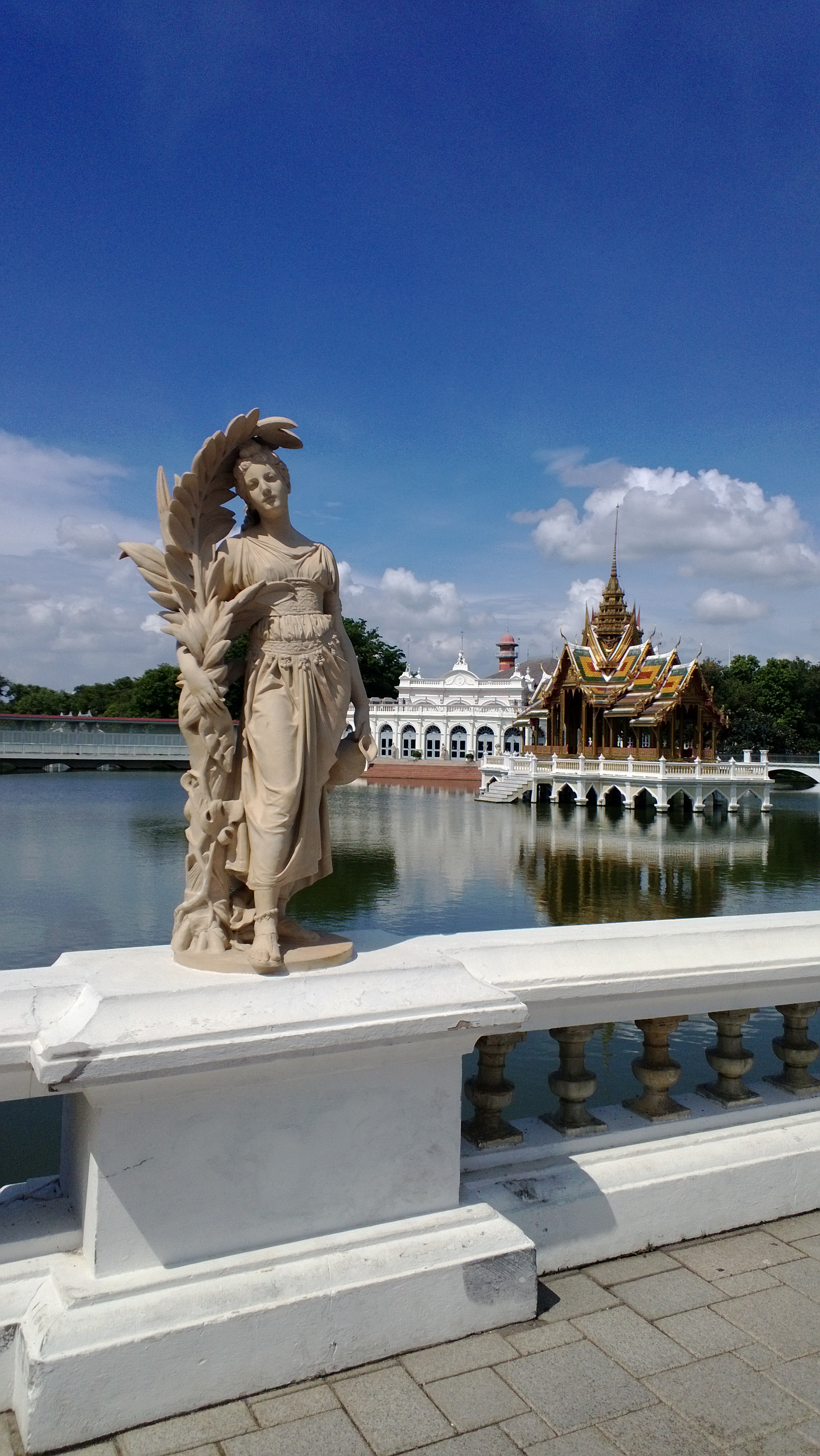
Aisawanthipphaya-At Pavilion from the bridge

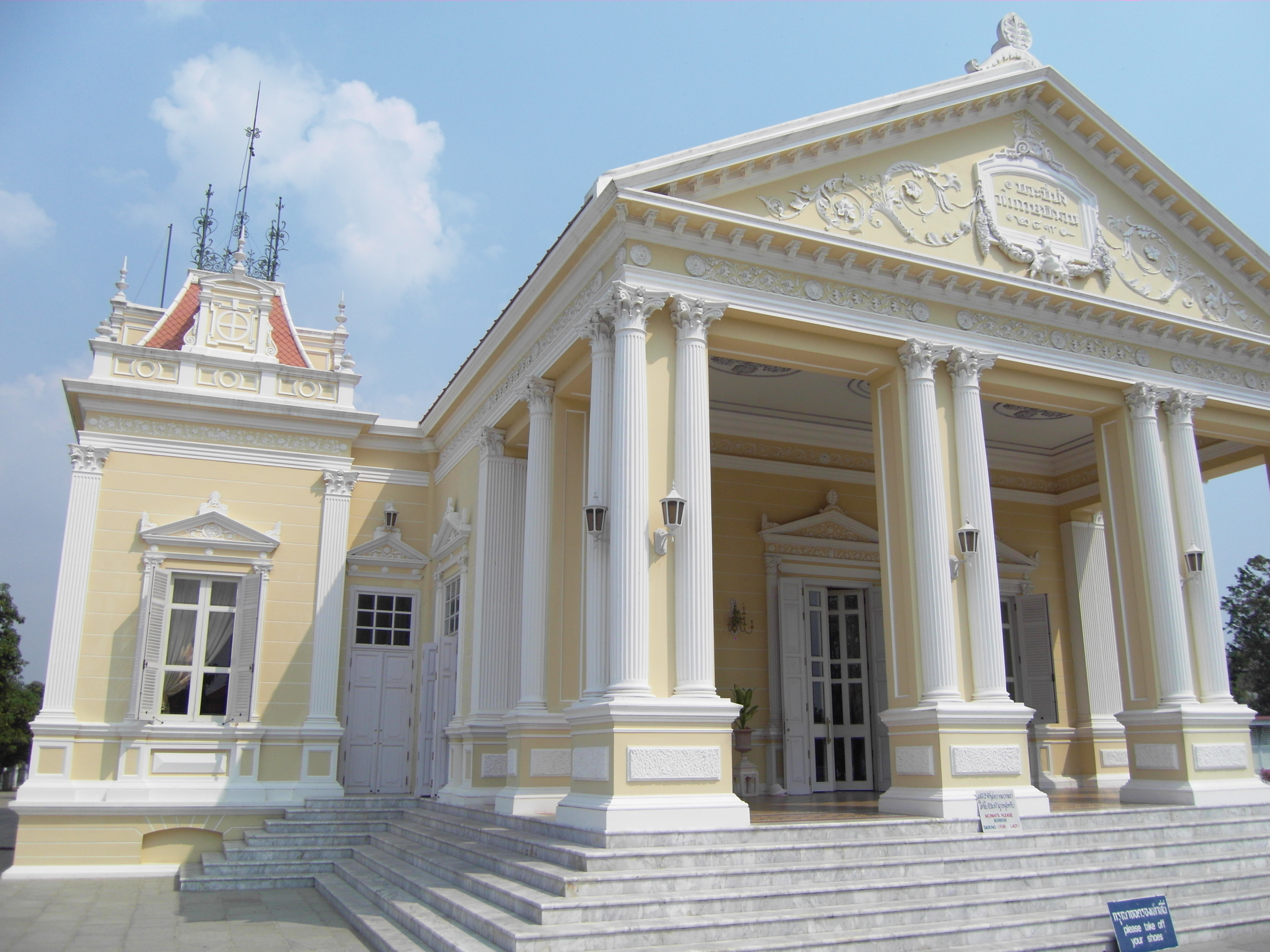
Warophat Phiman

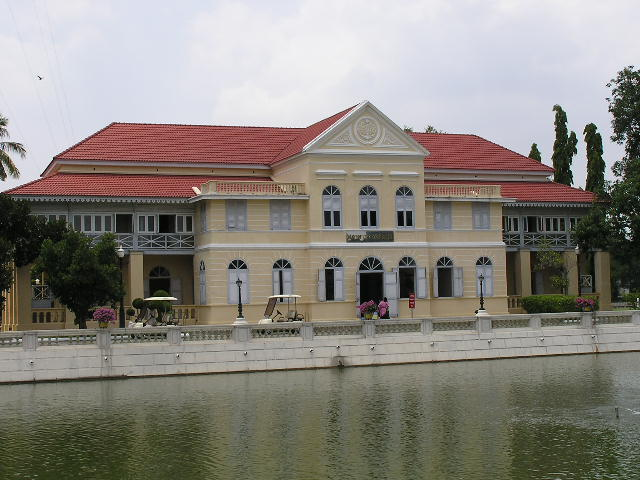
Saphakhan Ratchaprayun Residential Hall

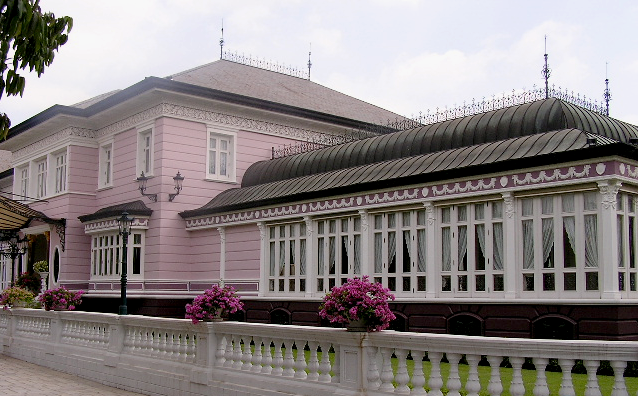
Uthayan Phumisathian Residential Hall

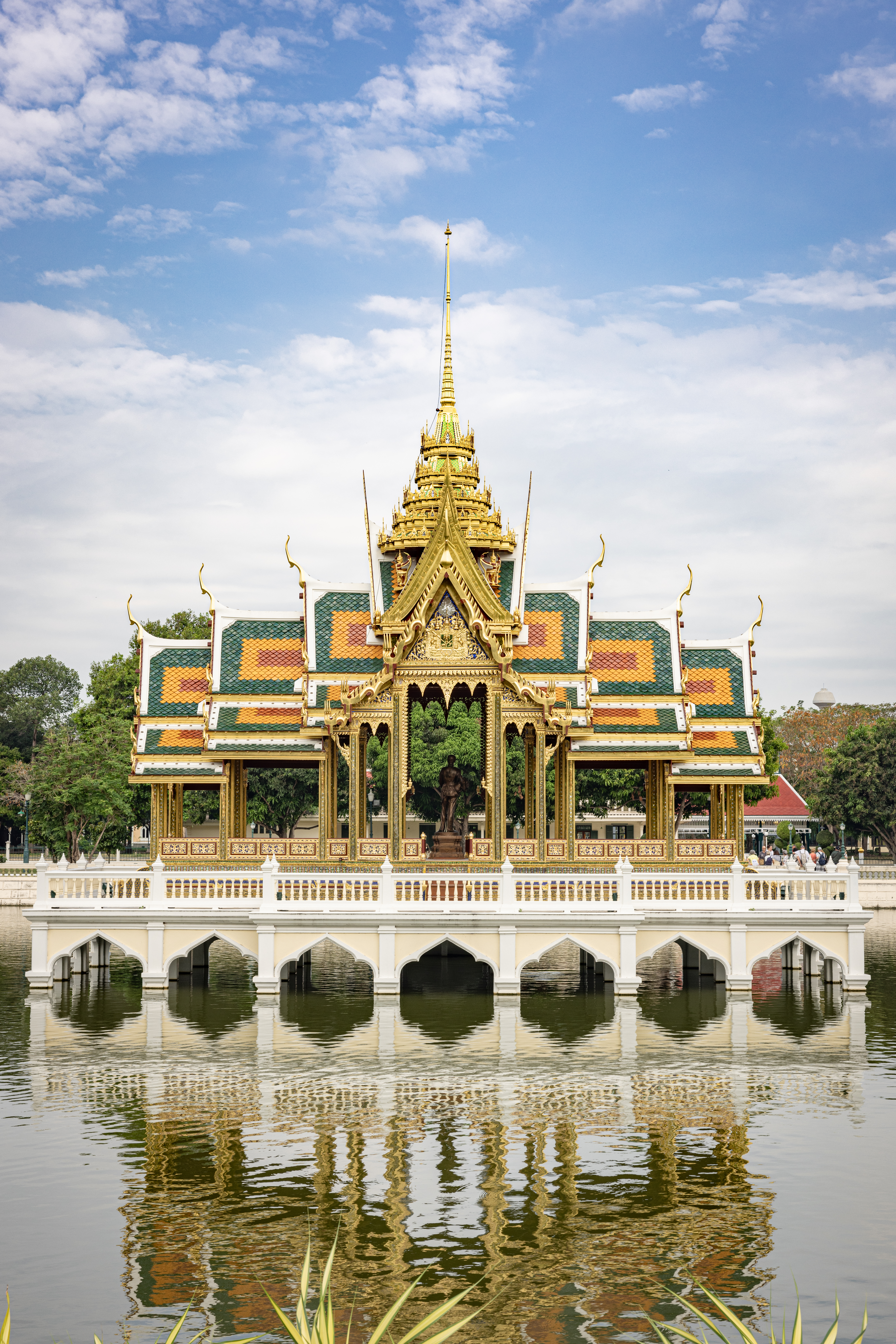
Warophat Phiman throne hall

== Milestones ==
- On 31 May 1880, King Chulalongkorn arranged a Royal Barge Procession to go to Bang Pa-in Palace with all of his wives. During the procession, the steam boat Sarawan collided with the royal barge that was carrying Queen Sunanda Kumariratana and their daughter, Princess Kannabhorn Bejaratana. The barge capsized, and the queen and princess drowned. After the accident, King Chulalongkorn constructed a marble monument at Bang Pa-In Palace in remembrance of the Queen and Princess.
- Princess Srivilailaksana died on 26 October 1904, at age 36. Her funeral ceremony was held in the Aisawanthipphaya Pavilion, and her cremation ceremony was held at Wat Niwet Thammaprawat. Princess Chandra Saradavara, died on 21 February 1905, from an illness contracted while paying respects to Srivilailaksana (her half-sister) at Bang Pa-In Palace.
- King Rama VI performed the royal wedding of Prince Prajadhipok and Princess Rambai Barni on 26 August 1918 at the Warophat Phiman throne hall.
- Bang Pa-In Palace was used to welcome many royal visitors during the reign of King Chulalongkorn. In addition, during the reign of King Bhumibol Adulyadej, it was used to host royal guests such as Beatrix of the Netherlands, Margrethe II of Denmark, Infanta Elena, Duchess of Lugo and Elizabeth II.

== Footnotes ==
The official English names of buildings within the complex as appear on the palace's printed map differ slightly from RTGS transliteration. Both renditions are listed as follows:
