= Bhaktra Bimalabarna =

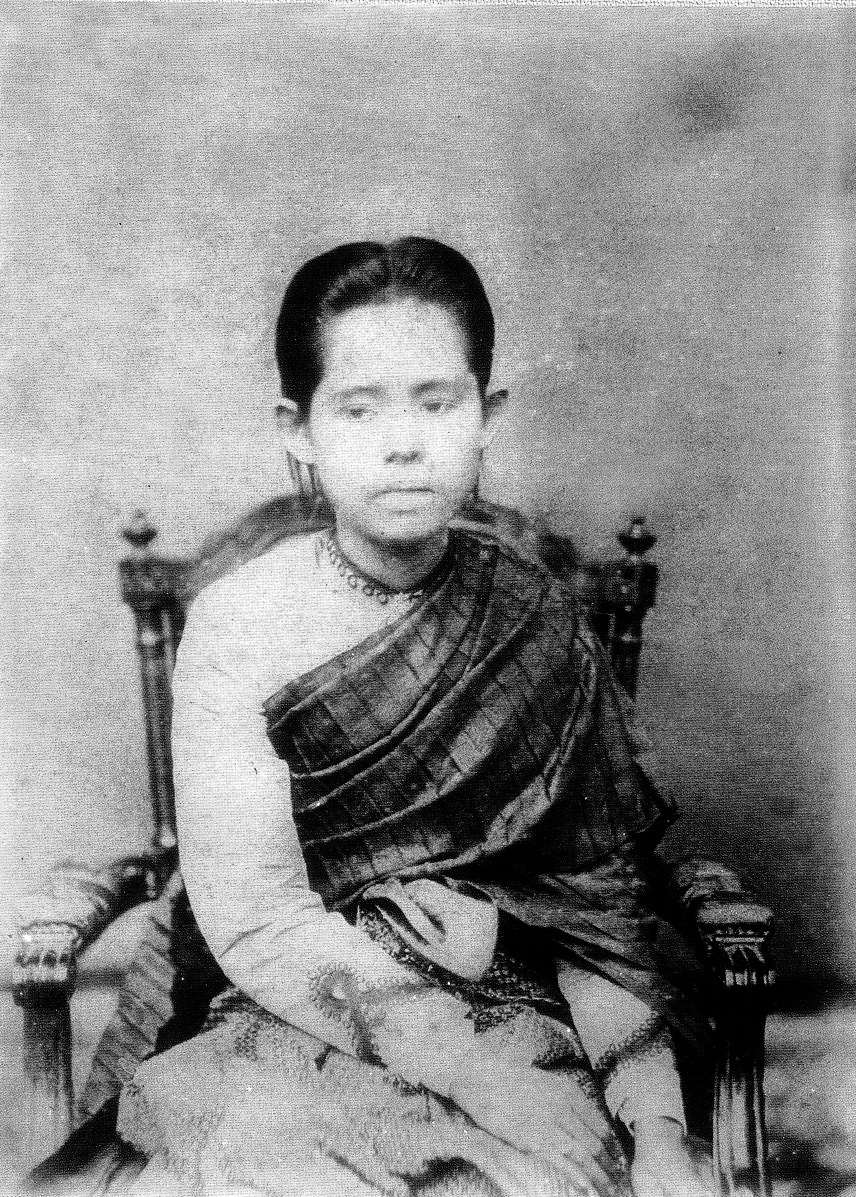
- Born: 25 October 1854; Bangkok, Siam
- Died: 18 October 1909 (aged 54); Bangkok, Siam
Names
- Her Royal Highness Princess Bhaktra Bimalabarna
- House: Chakri Dynasty
- Father: Mongkut (Rama IV)
- Mother: Pae Thamsaroj

Princess Bhaktra Bimalabarna (Thai: พักตร์พิมลพรรณ ; RTGS: Phakphimonphan ; 25 October 1854 - 18 October 1909) was a Princess of Siam (later Thailand). She was a member of Siamese royal family and a daughter of King Mongkut and Consort Phae Dharmasaroja.

Her mother was Chao Chom Manda Pae Thamsaroj (the daughter of Ao Thamsaroj and Si Thamsaroj) She was given the full name of Phra Chao Borom Wong Ther Phra Ong Chao Bhaktra Bimalabarna (Thai: พระเจ้าบรมวงศ์เธอ พระองค์เจ้าพักตร์พิมลพรรณ). She had 3 siblings 1 elder sister and 2 younger brother and 1 younger sister:

1. Princess Yingyaovalakshana
2. Princess Bhaktra Bimalabarna
3. Prince Kashemsanta Sobhaga
4. Prince Manusyanagamanop (later Vajirananavarorasa)
5. Princess Banchob Benchama

Princess Bhakta Bimalabarna died on 18 October 1909 at the age 54.

== Honours ==
- Dame Grand Commander (Second Class, upper grade) of the Most Illustrious Order of Chula Chom Klao
- King Rama IV Royal Cypher Medal, 2nd Class (1904)
