= Saovabhark Nariratana =

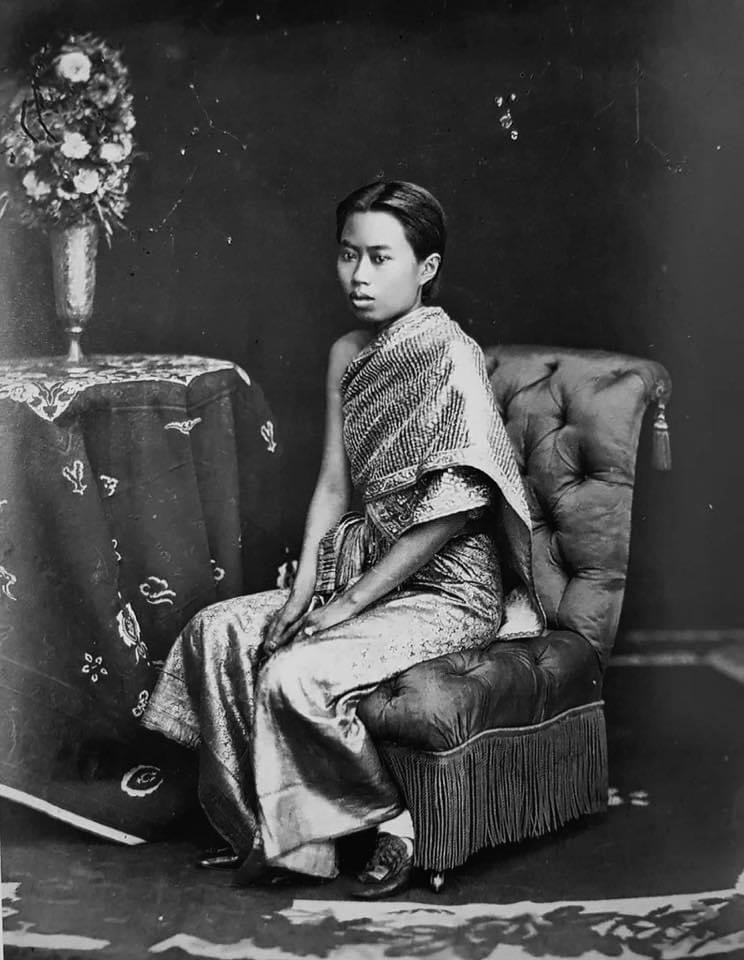
- Princess Saovabhak Nariratana

Princess consort of Siam
- Tenure: 1872 – 21 July 1887
- Born: Princess Piu Ladavalya; 26 January 1854; Bangkok, Siam
- Died: 21 July 1887 (aged 33); Bangkok, Siam
- Spouse: Chulalongkorn
- Issue: Chandra Saradavara
- Dynasty: Chakri
- Father: Ladavalya, Prince Bhumindra Bhakdi
- Mother: Chin

Saovabhark Nariratana (Thai: เสาวภาคย์นารีรัตน์; RTGS: Saowaphak Narirat), born Princess Piu Ladavalya (Thai: ปิ๋ว ลดาวัลย์; RTGS: Pio Ladawan; 26 January 1854 – 21 July 1887) was a consort of Chulalongkorn, the King of Siam.

She was a daughter of Ladavalya, Prince Bhumindra Bhakdi and Lady Chin.
