= Banchob Benchama =

- Princess of Siam
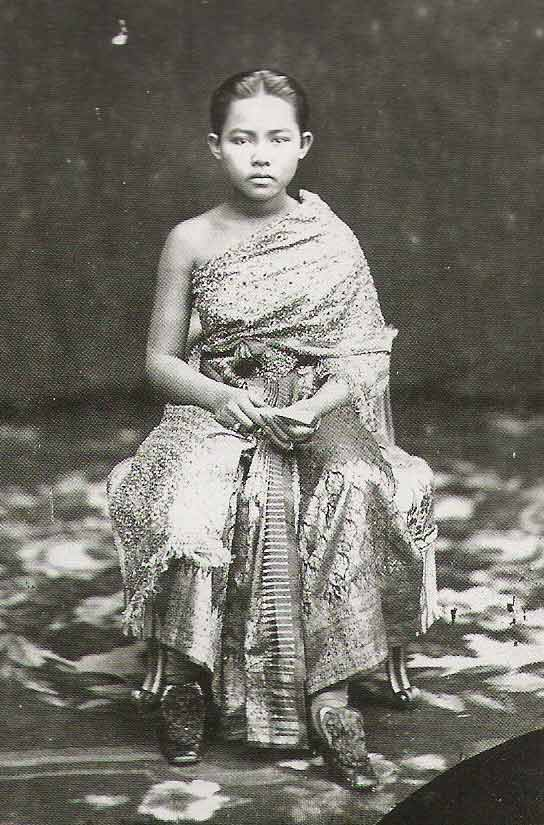
- Born: 5 November 1861; Bangkok, Siam
- Died: 13 September 1892 (aged 30); Bangkok, Siam
- Her Royal Highness Princess Banchob Benchama
- House: Chakri Dynasty
- Father: Mongkut (Rama IV)
- Mother: Chao Chom Manda Pae Thamsaroj

Her Royal Highness Princess Banchob Benchama or Phrachao Boromwong Ther Phra Ong Chao Banchob Benchama (Thai: บัญจบเบญจมา ; RTGS: Banchop Benchama, 5 November 1861 - 13 September 1892) was a Princess of Siam (later Thailand) and a member of the Siamese royal family. She was a daughter of King Mongkut and Chao Chom Manda Phae Dharmasaroja.

The princess' mother was Chao Chom Manda Pae Thamsaroj, who was the daughter of Phra Samran Haruethai (Uan Dharmasaroja) and Thao Songkandan (Si Dharmasaroja).

== Early life ==
Princess Banchob Benchama was born on 5 November 1861 at the Grand Palace. She was the couple's fifth child. Unfortunately as a result of her difficult birth her mother died the next day. Her full name as given by her father was "Phra Chao Borom Wong Ther Phra Ong Chao Banchob Banchama" (Thai: พระเจ้าบรมวงศ์เธอ พระองค์เจ้าบัญจบเบญจมา). Her name means the fifth and final child.

She had 4 siblings 2 elder sisters and 2 elder brothers:

1. Princess Yingyaovalakshana
2. Princess Bhaktrabimalabarna
3. Prince Kashemsanta Sobhaga the Prince of Phromwaranurak
4. Prince Manusyanagamanop (later Vajirananavarorasa)

Princess Banchob Benchama died on 24 September 1892 at the age 30.

== Ancestry ==
Ancestry of Banchob Benchama

16. (=22.) Pathum Borom Maha Chanok
8. Buddha Yodfa Chulaloke
17. (=23.) Phra Oakkarachaya (Daorueng or Yok)
4. Buddha Loetla Nabhalai
18. Thong Na Bangchang
9. Amarindra
19. Rup Sirisophak Mahanaknari
2. Mongkut
20. Hokkian Saetan
10. Ngoen Saetan
21. Sister of Than Puying Chamnan Borirak (Noi)
5. Srisuriyendra
22. (=16.) Pathum Borom Maha Chanok (Thongdi)
11. Sri Sudarak
23. (=17.) Phra Akkarachaya (Daorueng or Yok)
1. Princess Banchob Benchama
24. Chao Phraya Aphairacha (Chao Khun Pratu Jeen)
12. Chao Phraya Thammathikornnathibodi (Thongdi)
6. Phrasamranharithai (Uan Dharmasaroja)
26.
13.
27.
3. Consort Phae Dharmasaroja
28.
14.
29.
7. Thaosongkandan (Si Dharmasaroja)
30.
15.
31.
