= Chandra Saradavara =

Princess of Phichit (1873–1905)

- Princess of Phichit
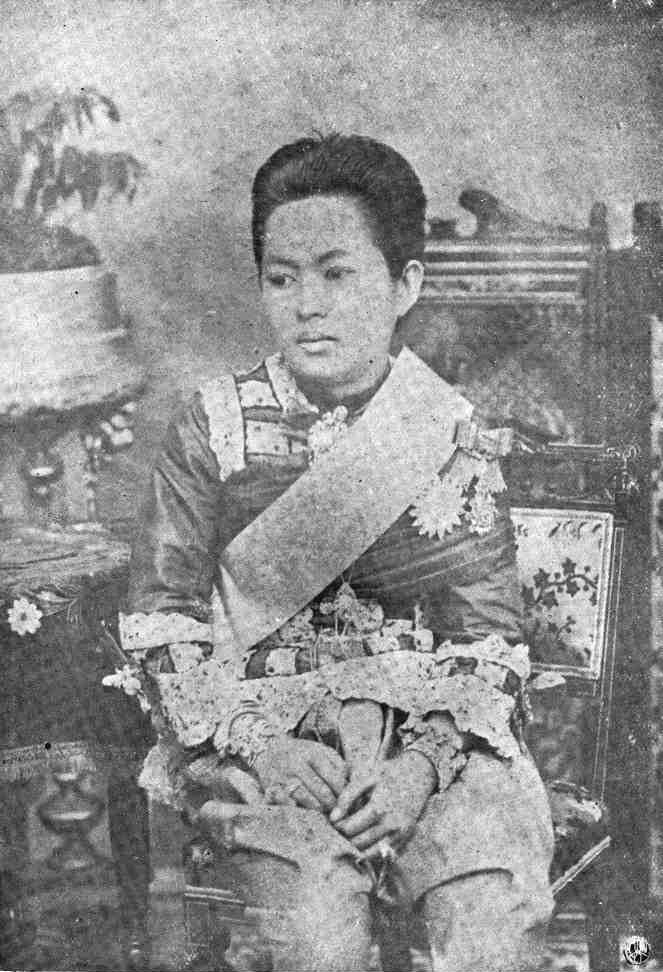
- Born: 15 April 1873; Grand Palace; Bangkok, Siam
- Died: 21 February 1905 (aged 31); Bangkok, Siam
Names
- Chandra Saradavara Varolanlaksanasombati Ratanarajakumari
- House: Chakri Dynasty
- Father: Chulalongkorn (Rama V)
- Mother: Saovabhark Nariratana

Chandra Saradavara, Princess of Phichit (Note: Thai: จันทราสรัทวาร; RTGS: Chanthrasaratthawan) (15 April 1873 – 21 February 1905), was a Princess of Siam (later Thailand). She was a member of Siamese Royal Family. She is a daughter of Chulalongkorn, King Rama V of Siam.

Her mother was Princess Saovabhak Nariratana, daughter of Prince Ladavalya, the Prince Bhumindrabhakdi and Mom Chin Ladavalya na Ayudhya. She was given full name by her father as Chandra Saradavara Varolanlaksanasombati Ratanarajakumari (Thai: จันทราสรัทวาร วโรฬารลักษณสมบัติ รัตนกุมารี)

She was an executive vice-president of the Red Unalom Society, a humanitarian organisation (later Thai Red Cross Society) founded by Queen Savang Vadhana. Queen Saovabha Phongsri was appointed as first president, and Than Phu Ying Plien Phasakoravongs acted as the society secretary. Chandra Saradavara worked as the executive vice-president with the other princesses:

- Queen Sukhumala Marasri
- Princess Suddha Dibyaratana, Princess Sri Ratanakosindra
- Princess Yaovamalaya Narumala, Princess of Sawankalok
- Princess Srivilailaksana, Princess of Suphanburi
- Princess Ubolratana Narinaka, Princess of Akaravorarajgalya
- Princess Saisavalibhirom, Princess of Suddhasininat Piyamaharaj Padivaradda
- The Noble Consort (Chao Chom Manda) Kesorn of King Chulalongkorn

On 12 March 1904, she was given the royal title from her father as The Princess of Phichit, or translated in Thai as Krom Khun Phichit Jessadachandra (Thai: กรมขุนพิจิตรเจษฎ์จันทร์). She was given the rank of Krom Khun, the 4th level of the Krom ranks.

Chandra Saradavara died on 21 February 1905, of a disease contracted while going to pay respects to her recently-deceased half-sister Princess Srivilailaksana at Bang Pa-In Royal Palace, Ayutthaya Province.

== Royal decorations ==
- Dame of The Most Illustrious Order of the Royal House of Chakri
- Dame Cross of the Most Illustrious Order of Chula Chom Klao (First class): received 26 November 1893

== Ancestry ==
Ancestor of Princess Chandra Saradavara, the Princess of Phichit Jessadachandra
Princess Chandra Saradavara, the Princess of Phichit	Father: Chulalongkorn, King Rama V of Siam	Paternal Grandfather: Mongkut, King Rama IV of Siam	Paternal Great-grandfather: Buddha Loetla Nabhalai, King Rama II of Siam
Princess Chandra Saradavara, the Princess of Phichit	Father: Chulalongkorn, King Rama V of Siam	Paternal Grandfather: Mongkut, King Rama IV of Siam	Paternal Great-grandmother: Queen Sri Suriyendra
Princess Chandra Saradavara, the Princess of Phichit	Father: Chulalongkorn, King Rama V of Siam	Paternal Grandmother: Queen Debsirindra	Paternal Great-grandfather: Prince Sirivongse, the Prince Matayabidaksa
Princess Chandra Saradavara, the Princess of Phichit	Father: Chulalongkorn, King Rama V of Siam	Paternal Grandmother: Queen Debsirindra	Paternal Great-grandmother: Mom Noi Sirivongs na Ayudhya
Princess Chandra Saradavara, the Princess of Phichit	Mother: Princess Saovabhak Nariratana	Maternal Grandfather: Prince Ladavalya, the Prince Bhumindrabhakdi	Maternal Great-grandfather: Nangklao, King Rama III of Siam
Princess Chandra Saradavara, the Princess of Phichit	Mother: Princess Saovabhak Nariratana	Maternal Grandfather: Prince Ladavalya, the Prince Bhumindrabhakdi	Maternal Great-grandmother: Chao Chom Manda Emnoi
Princess Chandra Saradavara, the Princess of Phichit	Mother: Princess Saovabhak Nariratana	Maternal Grandmother: Mom Chin Ladavalya na Ayudhya	Maternal Great-grandfather: unknown
Princess Chandra Saradavara, the Princess of Phichit	Mother: Princess Saovabhak Nariratana	Maternal Grandmother: Mom Chin Ladavalya na Ayudhya	Maternal Great-grandmother: unknown
