= Thai royal ranks and titles =

Thai royalty ranks

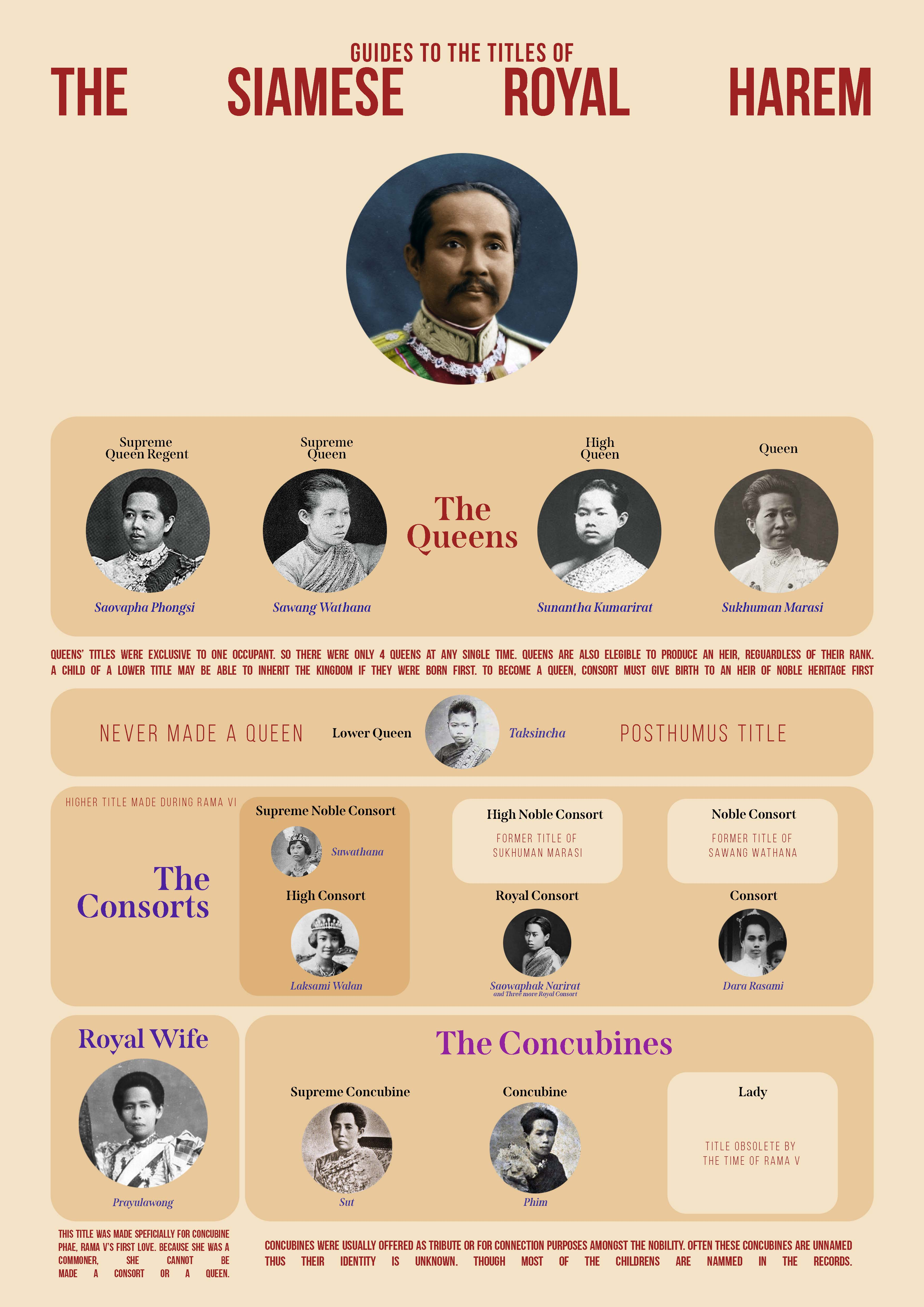
Infographic on the titles of consorts

The precedence of Thai royalty follows a system of ranks known as thanandon (Thai: ฐานันดร), which are accompanied by royal titles.

== The Sovereign ==
There are two styles which can be used for a king in ordinary speech, depending on whether he has been crowned:

- Crowned kings: Phra Bat Somdet Phra Chao Yu Hua (Thai: พระบาทสมเด็จพระเจ้าอยู่หัว; English: His Majesty the King) is the style used in ordinary speech when referring to the kings of Thailand after their coronation. This style may be used in two ways:
  - Preceding the name of the king; e.g., Phra Bat Somdet Phra Chao Yu Hua Phumiphon Adunyadet (Thai: พระบาทสมเด็จพระเจ้าอยู่หัวภูมิพลอดุลยเดช; His Majesty King Bhumibol Adulyadej).
  - More formally it can be split across the name, possibly with the omission (or modification) of the words "Phra Chao Yu Hua"; e.g., Phra Bat Somdet Phra Paramintara Maha Phumiphon Adunyadet (Thai: พระบาทสมเด็จพระปรมินทรมหาภูมิพลอดุลยเดช) and Phra Bat Somdet Phra Paramindara Maha Prajadhipok Phra Pokklao Chao Yu Hua (Thai: พระบาทสมเด็จพระปรมินทรมหาประชาธิปกฯ พระปกเกล้าเจ้าอยู่หัว).
- Uncrowned kings: Somdet Phra Chao Yu Hua (Thai: สมเด็จพระเจ้าอยู่หัว), normally preceding the king's name, is restricted to a king who has not yet been crowned. When crowned, he assumes the title of Phra Bat Somdet Phra Chao Yu Hua; e.g., Somdet Phra Chao Yu Hua Maha Wachiralongkon Bodinthrathepphayawarangkun (Thai: สมเด็จพระเจ้าอยู่หัวมหาวชิราลงกรณ บดินทรเทพยวรางกูร; His Majesty King Maha Vajiralongkorn Bodindradebayavarangkun).

== Consorts ==
Traditionally, titles of royal wives depended on their birth titles and royal favour; only princesses of high birth (Chao Fa, Phra Ong Chao and Mom Chao Ying) assuming titles higher than Chao Chom. There were no clear rules about the hierarchy of titles above Chao Chom until the time of King Mongkut, and titles changed over successive reigns. The rule about commoners also seems to be evolving, and it appears that there are no more restrictions on a commoner from becoming queen. Most of the titles below are from King Vajiravudh's 1924 enactment of the Succession Law.

Consorts
| Rank | Title | Style | Remarks |
|---|---|---|---|
| Somdet Phra Akkhara Mahesi สมเด็จพระอัครมเหสี (Queen Consort) | Somdet Phra Boromma Rajininat สมเด็จพระบรมราชินีนาถ (Queen Regent) | Somdet Phra Nang Chao + Name + Phra Boromma Rajini Nat; Her Majesty, the Queen | Nat (นาถ) means "shelter", bestowed upon a Queen who has acted as regent for her husband. |
| Somdet Phra Akkhara Mahesi สมเด็จพระอัครมเหสี (Queen Consort) | Somdet Phra Boromma Rajini สมเด็จพระบรมราชินี | Somdet Phra Nang Chao + Name + Phra Boromma Rajini; Her Majesty, the Queen | |
| Somdet Phra Akkhara Mahesi สมเด็จพระอัครมเหสี (Queen Consort) | Somdet Phra Boromma Rajadevi สมเด็จพระบรมราชเทวี | Somdet Phra Nang Chao + Name + Phra Boromma Rajadevi; Her Majesty, the Queen | |
| Somdet Phra Akkhara Mahesi สมเด็จพระอัครมเหสี (Queen Consort) | Somdet Phra Akkhara Rajadevi สมเด็จพระอัครราชเทวี | Somdet Phra Nang Chao + Name + Phra Akkhara Rajadevi; Her Majesty, the Queen | |
| Somdet Phra Akkhara Mahesi สมเด็จพระอัครมเหสี (Queen Consort) | Somdet Phra Rajini สมเด็จพระราชินี | Somdet Phra Rajini + Name | Temporary title before coronation |
| Phra Mahesi พระมเหสี (Princess Consort) | Phra Vara Rajadevi พระวรราชเทวี | Phra Nang Chao + Name + Phra Vara Rajadevi; Her Royal Highness, Princess, Royal Consort | |
| Phra Mahesi พระมเหสี (Princess Consort) | Phra Rajadevi พระราชเทวี | Phra Nang Chao + Name + Phra Rajadevi; Her Royal Highness, Princess, Royal Consort | |
| Phra Mahesi พระมเหสี (Princess Consort) | Phra Nang Thoe พระนางเธอ | Phra Nang Thoe + Name; Her Royal Highness, Princess, Royal Consort | |
| Phra Mahesi พระมเหสี (Princess Consort) | Phra Akkhara Chaya Thoe พระอรรคชายาเธอ | Phra Akkhara Chaya Thoe + Name; Her Highness, Princess, Royal Consort | |
| Phra Mahesi พระมเหสี (Princess Consort) | Phra Vara Raja Chaya Thoe พระวรราชชายาเธอ | Phra Vara Raja Chaya Thoe + Name; Her Highness, Princess, Royal Consort | |
| Phra Mahesi พระมเหสี (Princess Consort) | Phra Raja Chaya Thoe พระราชชายาเธอ | Phra Raja Chaya Thoe + Name; Her Highness, Princess, Royal Consort | |
| Phra Sanom พระสนม (Concubine) | Chao Khun Phra เจ้าคุณพระ; Royal Noble | Chao Khun Phra + Name | Appointed to: Foreign princess; Mom Chao (Her Serene Highness, Princess); Mom Rajawongse; Mom Luang; Commoners; During pregnancy, known as Chao Chom Manda, Manda means "mother" Phra was used during Rama VI's reign |
| Phra Sanom พระสนม (Concubine) | Chao Khun Chom Manda เจ้าคุณจอมมารดา; Noble concubine | Chao Khun Chom Manda + Name | Appointed to: Foreign princess; Mom Chao (Her Serene Highness, Princess); Mom Rajawongse; Mom Luang; Commoners; During pregnancy, known as Chao Chom Manda, Manda means "mother" Phra was used during Rama VI's reign |
| Phra Sanom พระสนม (Concubine) | Chao Chom Manda เจ้าจอมมารดา; Noble concubine | Chao Chom Manda + Name | Appointed to: Foreign princess; Mom Chao (Her Serene Highness, Princess); Mom Rajawongse; Mom Luang; Commoners; During pregnancy, known as Chao Chom Manda, Manda means "mother" Phra was used during Rama VI's reign |
| Phra Sanom พระสนม (Concubine) | Chom Manda จอมมารดา; Front Palace | Chom Manda + Name | Appointed to: Foreign princess; Mom Chao (Her Serene Highness, Princess); Mom Rajawongse; Mom Luang; Commoners; During pregnancy, known as Chao Chom Manda, Manda means "mother" Phra was used during Rama VI's reign |
| Phra Sanom พระสนม (Concubine) | Chao Chom เจ้าจอม; Concubine | Chao Chom + Name | Appointed to: Foreign princess; Mom Chao (Her Serene Highness, Princess); Mom Rajawongse; Mom Luang; Commoners; During pregnancy, known as Chao Chom Manda, Manda means "mother" Phra was used during Rama VI's reign |
| Phra Sanom พระสนม (Concubine) | Phra พระ; Lady | Phra + Name | Appointed to: Foreign princess; Mom Chao (Her Serene Highness, Princess); Mom Rajawongse; Mom Luang; Commoners; During pregnancy, known as Chao Chom Manda, Manda means "mother" Phra was used during Rama VI's reign |

== Princes and princesses ==
Holders of these titles are still considered royal, since they are (at most) two generations removed from a king. Nai Luang (ในหลวง) is an epithet for a king. Children of a king are called Luk Luang (ลูก หลวง "royal children"), and grandchildren of a king are called Laan Luang (หลาน หลวง "royal grandchildren"). The concept is similar to the French system of "princes of the blood" and the Iberian system of "infantes." In English, they are normally called "prince" or "princess". Special forms are used when one wishes to address them, although the language is less elaborate than when speaking to the king or the queen. A male Luk Luang who does not accede to the throne would assume a new royal surname, normally reflecting his birth name (as opposed to an honorific given later). The surname can be used by his wife if she is a commoner by birth, possibly with Na Ayudhya added if she has no noble title. It is otherwise not normally used until his children (or grandchildren) first hold the title of Mom Chao, when the surname will first appear in their names.

=== Sovereign's children ===
Order of precedence of a sovereign's children
| Rank | Title | | Remarks |
| Rank | Thai | English | Remarks |
| Somdet Chao Fa | Somdet Phra Anujadhiraj / Somdet Phra Kanitthadhiraj | His Royal Highness, The Hereditary Prince / Her Royal Highness, The Hereditary Princess | Elevated to "Heir Apparent" by Rama VI; Higher than the other royal family; for example, Chakrabongse Bhuvanath, Prince of Phitsanulok; Asdang Dejavudh, Prince of Nakhon Ratchasima; Elevated for "Princess Royal" by Rama X Higher than the other royal family; for example, Sirindhorn, the Princess Debaratana Rajasuda, the Princess Royal |
| Somdet Chao Fa | Somdet Chao Fa; Special Class | His Royal Highness, Prince | Elevated to "Special Class" by Rama VII and Bhanurangsi Savangvongse, Prince Banubandhu Vongsevoradej |
| Somdet Chao Fa | Somdet Phra Chao Borommawong Thoe; Chao Fa; First Class | His Royal Highness, Prince (Princess) | For a sovereign's children with: 1. The Queen; 2. Royal consorts who are a sovereign's daughter |
| Somdet Chao Fa | Somdet Phra Chao Borommawong Thoe; Chao Fa; Second Class | His Royal Highness, Prince (Princess) | For a sovereign's children with: 1. Royal consorts who are a sovereign's granddaughter 2. A foreign princess |
| Phra Ong Chao; Special Class | Somdet Phra Chao Borommawong Thoe; Phra Ong Chao | His Royal Highness, Prince (Princess) | For a sovereign's children with: 1. HSH Princess; 2. A royal concubine |
| Phra Ong Chao; First Class | Phra Chao Baromwongse Thoe; Phra Ong Chao | His Royal Highness, Prince (Princess) | For a sovereign's children with: 1. HSH Princess; 2. A royal concubine |

=== Viceroy's children ===
Order of precedence of Viceroy's children
| Rank | Title | | Remarks |
| Rank | Thai | English | Remarks |
| Special Class | Phra Chao Rajvorawongse Ther Chao Fa (พระเจ้าราชวรวงศ์เธอ เจ้าฟ้า) | His Royal Highness, Prince (Princess) | For Viceroy's children with a royal consort who is a princess |
| Phra Ong Chao | Phra Chao Rajvorawongse Ther; Phra Ong Chao (พระเจ้าราชวรวงศ์เธอ พระองค์เจ้า) | His Royal Highness, Prince (Princess) | For children of Viceroys: 1. Maha Sura Singhanat; 2. Maha Senanurak; 3. Maha Sakdi Balasebya; 4. Pinklao |
| Phra Ong Chao | Phra Rajvorawongse Ther; Phra Ong Chao (พระราชวรวงศ์เธอ พระองค์เจ้า) | His Royal Highness, Prince (Princess) | For children of Wichaichan |

=== Sovereign's grandchildren ===
Order of precedence of sovereign's grandchildren
| Rank | Title | | Remarks |
| Rank | Thai | English | Remarks |
| Somdet Chao Fa | Somdet Phra Chao Lanh Ther Chao Fa (สมเด็จพระเจ้าหลานเธอ เจ้าฟ้า) | His Royal Highness, Prince (Princess) | For children of the sovereign's daughters or the sovereign's sisters with a prince. They are the third class of Chao Fa. |
| Phra Ong Chao | Phra Chao Lanh Ther Phra Ong Chao (พระเจ้าหลานเธอ พระองค์เจ้า) | His Royal Highness, Prince (Princess) | For children of the sovereign's sons (First Class) with a princess or royal consort. After their grandfather's reign, their title changes to Phra Chao Voravongse Ther Phra Ong Chao (พระเจ้าวรวงศ์เธอ พระองค์เจ้า) |
| Phra Ong Chao | Phra Lanh Ther Phra Ong Chao (พระหลานเธอ พระองค์เจ้า) | His Highness, Prince (Princess) | For children of: 1. The sovereign's sons (First Class) with a commoner elevated by the king 2. The sovereign's sons (Second Class) with a princess; After their grandfather's reign, their title changes to Phra Voravongse Ther Phra Ong Chao (พระวรวงศ์เธอ พระองค์เจ้า) |
| Phra Ong Chao | Phra Sambandhawongse Ther; Phra Ong Chao (พระสัมพันธวงศ์เธอ พระองค์เจ้า) | His Highness, Prince (Princess) | For children of Prince Matayabitaksa, maternal grandfather of Rama V |
| Mom Chao | Mom Chao (หม่อมเจ้า) | His Serene Highness, Prince (Princess) | For children of the sovereign's sons with a commoner |

=== Sovereign's nephew or niece ===
Order of precedence of sovereign's nephew or niece
| Rank | Title | | Remarks |
| Rank | Thai | English | Remarks |
| Somdet Chao Fa | Somdet Phra Sambhandhawongse Ther; Chao Fa (สมเด็จพระสัมพันธวงศ์เธอ เจ้าฟ้า) | His Royal Highness, Prince (Princess) | For children of Rama I's eldest sisters; Princess Debsudavadi and Princess Sri Sudaraksha |
| Phra Ong Chao | Phra Prabhandhawongse Ther; Phra Ong Chao (พระประพันธวงศ์เธอ พระองค์เจ้า) | His Highness, Prince (Princess) | For children of deputy viceroy Anuraksha Deveshra with a royal consort |
| Mom Chao | Mom Chao (หม่อมเจ้า) | His Serene Highness, Prince (Princess) | For children of: 1. Sons and daughters of Princess Debsudavadi and Princess Sri Sudaraksha's son 2. Sons and daughters of deputy viceroy Anuraksha Deveshra with a concubine |

=== Viceroy's grandchildren ===
Order of precedence of Viceroy's grandchildren
| Rank | Title | | Remarks |
| Rank | Thai | English | Remarks |
| Phra Ong Chao | Phra Wongse Ther Phra Ong Chao (พระวงศ์เธอ พระองค์เจ้า) | His Highness, Prince (Princess) | For the Viceroy's grandchildren who are promoted to this rank. |
| Mom Chao | Mom Chao (หม่อมเจ้า) | His Serene Highness, Prince (Princess) | For the Viceroy's grandchildren |

=== Sovereign's great-grandchildren ===
Order of precedence of sovereign's great-grandchildren
| Rank | Title | | Remarks |
| Rank | Thai | English | Remarks |
| Mom Chao | Mom Chao (หม่อมเจ้า) | His Serene Highness, Prince (Princess) | For children of the sovereign's grandchildren in the class of Phra Chao Lanh Thor Phra Ong Chao (HRH, Prince) |
| Mom Rajawongse | Mom Rajawongse (หม่อมราชวงศ์) | His Excellency/ His Grace | For children of the sovereign's grandchildren in the class of Phra Lanh Thor Phra Ong Chao (HH Prince) and Mom Chao (HSH Prince). They are not members of the royal family. |

== Royal descendants ==
More distant royal progeny, starting from the children of male Mom Chao, are considered commoners. However, these commoners have titles indicating that their ancestry can be traced back to a king.

=== Mom Rajawongse ===
Mom Rajawongse (หม่อมราชวงศ์, RTGS: Mom Ratchawong; abbreviated in Thai as ม.ร.ว. and in English as M.R. and translated as "His/Her Excellency") is the title assumed by children of male Mom Chao M.C.(English) M.C. After first name Informally, they may be called Khun Chai (male) or Khun Ying (female) (คุณชาย.../คุณหญิง...). Holders of this title are occasionally erroneously referred to as princes or princesses in older English documents; it is now more common to use the correct title, "Mom Rajawongse". If a specific title is appended, sometimes the titular may be called His/Her Grace by proclamation of the King or a Prince-Regent, but not by a Queen-regent or any royal member sitting in the King's capacity as a Councillor-of-State.

=== Mom Luang ===
Mom Luang (หม่อมหลวง, abbreviated in Thai ม.ล. and sometimes in English as M. L. and translated as "The Honourable") are the last royal descendants retaining a title. Mom Luang titles are conferred on children of male Mom Rajawongse. Colloquially (although incorrectly), they are sometimes addressed as "Mom"; the correct informal address is "Khun" (คุณ).

=== Na Ayudhya ===
In the Family Name Act, B. E. 2465, Rama VI ordered that royal descendants who do not hold any title should append "na Ayudhya" (ณ อยุธยา) to their surname to signify they are descended from a royal bloodline. Sometime spelled "Na Ayutthaya".

=== Wife of prince ===
Wives of princes have titles, depending on the titles on both sides.

==== Phra Vorachaya ====
Phra Vorachaya (พระวรชายา) is a title of the royal consort of the Crown Prince. She is elevated to Phra Chao Vorawongse Ther Phra Ong Chao.

==== Phra Chaya ====
Phra Chaya (พระชายา) is a princess, Chao Fa (HRH Princess) or Phra Ong Chao (HRH Princess , HH Princess) who is married to prince, at every level. She retains her own title. When referring to her as a wife of the prince, she may be called "Phra Chaya Nai (husband's name)".

==== Chaya ====
Chaya (ชายา) is a princess or Mom Chao (HSH Princess) who is married to prince, at every level. Again, she would retain her own title. When referring to her as a wife of the prince, she may be called "Chaya Nai (husband's name)".

==== Moam ====
Mom (หม่อม), in this context, is a commoner married to a prince. She uses this title as a prefix of her name, adding na Ayudhya to her new surname; for example, Mom Srirasmi Mahidol na Ayudhya (a wife of Chao Fa Maha Vajiralongkorn, whose surname is Mahidol). If she has her own title (Mom Rajawongse or Mom Luang), she retains it.

=== Married princesses ===
The son of a holder of the following titles generally inherits a title one step below; a female Mom Rajawongse married to a commoner would produce a child with no title. According to the Royal Marriages Act, B. E. 2475, a princess wishing to marry to a commoner must request royal permission and abandon her royal title. For example, if princess Chao Fa, HRH Princess of Thailand, wished to marry a Mom Rajawongse commoner she would lose her royal title (Chao Fa, HRH Princess of Thailand) but retain royal style as follows:

- Chao Fa, HRH Princess of Thailand: Tunkramom Ying (daughter of the sovereign with the queen)
  - Tunkramom Ying Ubolratana Rajakanya, formerly Somdet Phra Chao Luk Thoe Chao Fa Ubolratana Rajakanya
- Chao Fa, HRH Princess of Thailand: Somdet Ying (daughter of the sovereign with the royal consort)
- Phra Ong Chao, HRH Princess of Thailand: Sadet Phra Ong Ying (daughter of the sovereign with the concubine)
- Phra Ong Chao, HRH Princess of Thailand: Phra Ong Ying (daughter of the son of the sovereign with the queen or his royal consort)
- Phra Ong Chao, HH Princess of Thailand: Than Phra Ong Ying (daughter of the son of the sovereign who was elevated from Mom Chao to Phra Ong Chao)
- Mom Chao, HSH Princess of Thailand: Than Ying (daughter of the son of the sovereign and his consort, or great-granddaughter of the sovereign)

However, Chao Fa Chulabhorn Walailak received permission from the king to keep her title when she married commoner Virayudh Tishyasarin.

== Royal peerage ==
In addition to royal ranks and titles, royals may also receive noble titles in the style of the nobility. These are referred to as krom (กรม) titles. While the granting of noble titles ceased with the abolition of absolute monarchy in 1932, on very rare occasions the king may still grant an honorary noble title to a royal.

The noble title, which consists of a rank and a title, is appended to the royal name and title, prefixed with the word krom (pronounced kromma when forming part of the title). For example, the full title of the King's sister is "Somdej Phra Chao Pheenang Ther Chao Fa Galyani Vadhana Kromma Luang Narathivat Rajanakarin. Nevertheless, it is the princely title which will be more frequently omitted when contracting the title e.g. Somdej Phra Chao Boromawong Ther Kromma Phraya Damrong Rajanubhab (born Phra Ong Chao Disuankumaan). There are 5 feudal titles for prince/princess:

The ranks of royal peerage are:

- Somdej Krom Phraya or Somdet Phra (สมเด็จพระ): Highest rank of royal peerage, usually granted to the Queen Mother, Princess Mother and Maha Uparaj. Somdet Phra was created by Rama VI, replacing Krom Somdet (สมเด็จกรมพระยา หรือ กรมสมเด็จพระ).
  - Queen Mothers:
    - Somdet Phra Amarindra Borommarachini: HM Queen Amarindra, Queen Mother of Rama II
    - Somdet Phra Suriyendra Borommarachini: HM Queen Sri Suriyendra, Queen Mother of Rama IV
    - Somdet Phra Debsirindra Borommarachini: HM Queen Debsirindra, Queen Mother of Rama V
    - Somdet Phra Sri Bajarindra Borommarachininat: HM Queen Sri Bajarindra, Queen Mother of Rama VI and Rama VII
  - Princess Mothers:
    - Somdet Phra Sri Sulalai: HRH Princess Sri Sulalai, Princess Mother of Rama III
    - Somdet Phra Srinagarindra Borommaratchachonnani: HRH Princess Srinagarindra, Princess Mother of Rama VIII and Rama IX
  - Viceroys:
    - Somdet Phra Bowararat Chao Maha Sura Singhanat: HRH Prince Maha Sura Singhanat, Viceroy of Rama I
    - Somdet Phra Bowararat Chao Maha Senanurak: HRH Prince Maha Senanurak, Viceroy of Rama II
    - Somdet Phra Bowararat Chao Maha Sakdi Balasebya: HRH Prince Maha Sakdi Balasebya, Viceroy of Rama III
- Krom Phra (กรมพระ)
  - Krom Phraya Chakkrabatradipongse: His Royal Highness Prince Chaturonrasmi, The Prince Chakkrabatradipongse, Son of Rama IV and Brother of Rama V
  - Krom Phraya Devawongse Varopakar: His Royal Highness Prince Devan Udayawongse, The Prince Devawongse Varopakar, Son of Rama IV
  - Krom Phraya Bhanubandhu Vongsevoradej: His Royal Highness Prince Bhanurangsi Savangwongse, The Prince Bhanubandhu Vongsevoradej, Son of Rama IV and Brother of Rama V
  - Krom Phraya Vajirananavarorasa: His Royal Highness Prince Manuṣyanāgamānob, The Prince Vajirananavarorasa, Son of Rama IV
  - Krom Phraya Narathip Praphanphong: His Royal Highness Prince Voravanakara, The Prince Narathip Praphanphong, Son of Rama IV
  - Krom Phraya Damrong Rajanubhab: His Royal Highness Prince Tisavarakumarn, The Prince Damrong Rajanubhab, Son of Rama IV
  - Krom Phraya Svastivatana Visishtha: His Royal Highness Prince Svasti Sobhana, The Prince Svastivatana Visishtha, Son of Rama IV
  - Krom Phraya Nakhon Sawan: His Royal Highness Prince Paribatra Sukhumbandhu, Prince of Nakhon Sawan, Son of Rama V
  - Krom Phraya Kamphaeng Phet: His Royal Highness Prince Purachatra Jayakara, Prince of Kamphaeng Phet, Son of Rama V
  - Krom Phraya Chai Nat: His Royal Highness Prince Rangsit Prayurasakdi, Prince of Chai Nat, Son of Rama V
  - Krom Phra Srisavangvadhana: Her Royal Highness Princess Chulabhorn, The Princess Srisavangvadhana, Daughter of Rama IX and Sister of Rama X
- Kromma Luang (กรมหลวง)
  - Kromma Luang Samorarattanasirijeshtha: Her Royal Highness Princess Somavadi, The Princess Samorarattanasirijestha, Daughter of Rama IV
  - Kromma Luang Bijitprijakara: His Royal Highness Prince Gagananga Yugala, The Prince Bijitprijakara, Son of Rama IV
  - Kromma Luang Phromwaranurak: His Royal Highness Prince Kashemsanta Sobhaga, The Prince Phromwaranurak, Son of Rama IV
  - Kromma Luang Dibyaratana Kiritkulini: Her Royal Highness Princess Nabhabhorn Prabha, The Princess Dibyaratana Kiritkulini, Daughter of Rama IV
  - Kromma Luang Ratchaburi: His Royal Highness Prince Raphi Phatthanasak, Prince of Ratchaburi, Son of Rama V
  - Kromma Luang Nakhon Chai Si: His Royal Highness Prince Chirapravati Voradej, Prince of Nakhon Chai Si, Son of Rama V
  - Kromma Luang Si Rattanakosin: Her Royal Highness Princess Suddha Dibyaratana, Princess of Rattanakosin, Daughter of Rama V
  - Kromma Luang Chumphon: His Royal Highness Prince Abhkara Kiartivongse, Prince of Chumphon, Son of Rama V
  - Kromma Luang Nakhon Ratchasima: His Royal Highness The Hereditary Prince Asdang Dejavudh, Prince of Nakhon Ratchasima, Son of Rama V, Brother of Rama VI and Rama VII
  - Kromma Luang Bishnulok: His Royal Highness The Hereditary Prince Chakrabongse Bhuvanath, Prince of Bishnulok, Son of Rama V, Brother of Rama VI and Rama VII
  - Kromma Luang Lopburi: His Royal Highness Prince Yugala Dighambara, Prince of Lopburi, Son of Rama V
  - Kromma Luang Sing Buri: His Royal Highness Prince Vudhijaya Chalermlabha, Prince of Sing Buri, Son of Rama V
  - Kromma Luang Phetchaburi Rajasirindorn: Her Royal Highness Princess Valaya Alongkorn, Princess of Phetchaburi, Daughter of Rama V
  - Kromma Luang Naradhiwas Rajanagarindra: Her Royal Highness Princess Galyani Vadhana, Princess of Naradhiwas, Sister of Rama VIII and Rama IX
  - Kromma Luang Rajasarini Siribajra: Her Royal Highness Princess Bajrakitiyabha, The Princess Rajasarini Siribajra, Daughter of Rama X
- Kromma Khun (กรมขุน) Chao Fa starts from this title
  - Kromma Khun Khattiyakanlaya: Her Royal Highness Princess Kannikakaew, The Princess Khattiyakanlaya, Daughter of Rama IV
  - Kromma Khun Suphan Bhakdi: Her Royal Highness Princess Srivilailaksana, Princess of Suphanburi, Daughter of Rama V
  - Kromma Khun Phichit Jessadachandra: Her Royal Highness Princess Chandra Saradavara, Princess of Phichit, Daughter of Rama V
  - Kromma Khun Sawankhalok Laksanavadi: Her Royal Highness Princess Yaovamalaya Narumala, Princess of Sawankhalok, Daughter of Rama V
  - Kromma Khun Nakhon Si Thammarat: His Royal Highness Prince Sommatiwongse, Prince of Nakhon Si Thammarat, Son of Rama V
  - Kromma Khun Si Satchanalai: Her Royal Highness Princess Malini Nobhadara, Princess of Si Satchanalai, Daughter of Rama V
  - Kromma Khun Uthongket Khattiyanari: Her Royal Highness Princess Nibha Nobhadol, Princess of U Thong, Daughter of Rama V
  - Kromma Khun Phetcabun: His Royal Highness Prince Chudadhuj Dharadilok, Prince of Phetcabun, Son of Rama V, Brother of Rama VI and Rama VII
- Kromma Muen (กรมหมื่น) Phra Ong Chao starts from this title
  - Kromma Muen Mahisara Rajaharudaya: His Royal Highness Prince Jayanta Mongkol, The Prince Mahisara Rajaharudaya, Son of Rama IV
  - Kromma Muen Phichai: His Royal Highness Prince Benbadhanabongse, Prince of Phichai, Son of Rama V
  - Kromma Muen Suddhanarinatha: Her Royal Highness Princess Soamsawali, The Princess Suddhanarinatha, Mother of the First Child of Rama X

Since the time of King Chulalongkorn, the honorific titles given to the royalties normally incorporate a city name or its modified form, and the holders are known in English as the Prince or Princess of that city.

The sovereign may grant titles to other royal-family members:

1. Somdet Phra Prathom Borom Ratchachonok: HRH Prince Father of Rama I
2. Somdet Phra Rupsirisobakya Mahanaknari: HRH Princess Rupsirisobakya Mahanaknari, Mother of Queen Amarindra
3. Somdet Phra Piyamavadi Sri Bajarindra Mata: HRH Princess Piyamavadi Sri Bajarindra Mata, Mother of Queen Saovabha Bongsri
4. Somdet Phra Sri Savarindira Barom Raja Devi: HM Queen Sri Savarindira, Queen Grandmother of Rama VIII and Rama IX
5. Somdet Phra Mahitaladhibes Adulyadejvikrom Phra Borom Ratchachonok: HRH Prince Mahidol Adulyadej, Prince Father of Rama VIII and Rama IX
6. Somdet Phra Debaratanarajasuda Chao Fa Maha Chakri Sirindhorn Rathasimagunakornpiyajat Sayamboromrajakumari: HRH Princess Sirindhorn, the Princess Royal (Daughter of Rama IX and Younger Sister of Rama X)

== See also ==
- Thai honorifics
- Rama (Kings of Thailand)
- Regnal name
- Saopha (Shan States)
- Thai nobility
