= Suddha Dibyaratana =

Princess of Rattanakosin (1877–1922)

- Princess of Rattanakosin
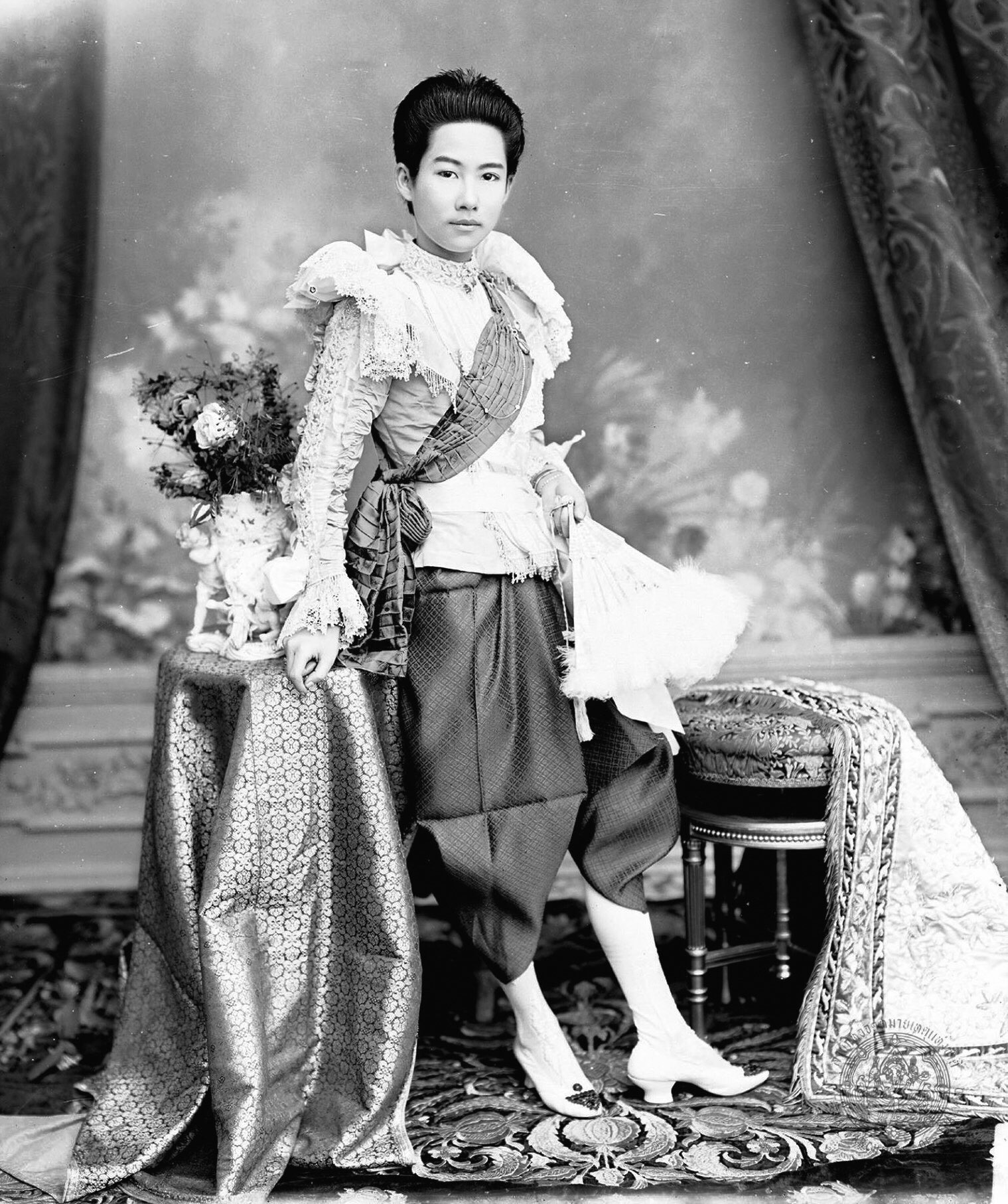
- Born: 14 September 1877; Grand Palace; Bangkok, Siam
- Died: 2 January 1922 (aged 44); Bangkok, Siam
Names
- Suddha Dibayaratana Sukhumkhattiya Galyavadi
- House: Chakri dynasty
- Father: Chulalongkorn (Rama V)
- Mother: Sukhumala Marasri
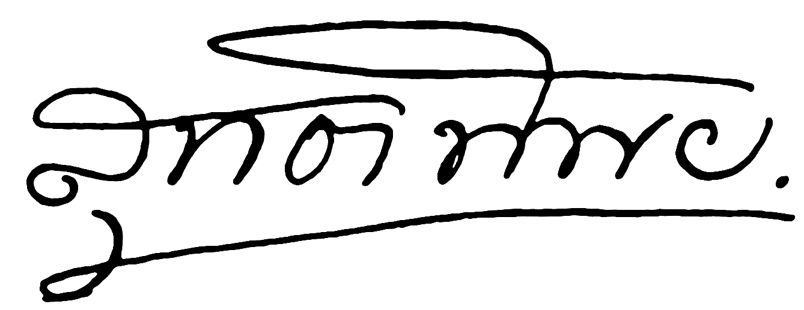
- Signature

Suddha Dibyaratana, Princess of Rattanakosin (Thai: สุทธาทิพยรัตน์; RTGS: Sutthathipphayarat; 14 September 1877 – 2 January 1922), was the Princess of Siam (later Thailand). She was a member of the Siamese royal family. She was given the highest rank of any daughter of Chulalongkorn, King Rama V of Siam.

Her mother was Queen Sukhumala Marasri, fourth Queen Consort and half-sister of King Chulalongkorn. She had a younger brother, Paribatra Sukhumbandhu, the Prince of Nakhon Sawan. Her full given name was Suddha Dibyaratana Sukhumkhattiya Galyavadi (Thai: สุทธาทิพยรัตน์ สุขุมขัตติยกัลยาวดี. She was, if not, one of the most beautiful princesses out of all the King's daughters.

On 9 August 1906, she was given the royal title of The Princess of Rattanakosin, translated in Thai as Krommaluang Si Rattanakosin (Thai: กรมหลวงศรีรัตนโกสินทร). She was the only daughter given the rank of Krommaluang, the 3rd level of the Krom ranks.

== Royal duties ==
She was one of the executive vice-presidents of the Red Unalom Society, the major humanitarian organization (later Thai Red Cross Society), founded by Queen Savang Vadhana as a maternal patron. Queen Saovabha Phongsri was appointed the first president, and Than Pu Ying Plien Phasakoravongs acted as the society secretary. Suddha Dibyaratana worked as the executive vice president with the other princesses;

- Queen Sukhumala Marasri
- Princess Yaovamalaya Narumala, the Princess of Sawankalok
- Princess Chandra Saradavara, the Princess of Phichit
- Princess Srivilailaksana, the Princess of Suphanburi
- Princess Ubolratana Narinaka, the Princess Akaravorarajgalya
- Princess Saisavalibhirom, the Princess Suddhasininat Piyamaharaj Padivaradda
- Chao Chom Manda (Noble Consort) Kesorn of King Chulalongkorn

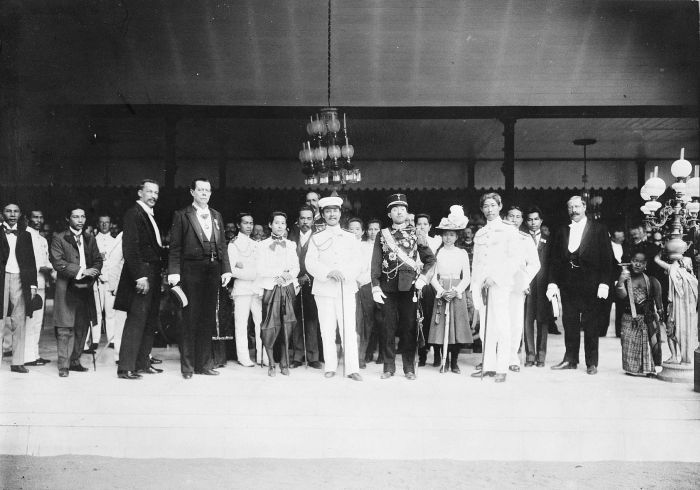
Princess Suddha Dibyaratana with King Chulalongkorn and Susuhunan Pakubuwana X at Surakarta Royal Palace in 1901.

When she turned 40 years old in 1917, Suddha Dibyaratana gave 200,000 bahts to the Thai Red Cross Society, to build Chulalongkorn Hospital, to honor her father. When the hospital was completed, she named the building Suddhathip 2463. At present, the Chulalongkorn Hospital uses this building as the Nursing College.

== Later life ==
After her father's death in 1910, she moved from her own residence in the Grand Palace to live with her mother, Queen Sukhumala Marasri and her younger brother, Paribatra Sukhumbandhu, the Prince of Nakhon Sawan. In later life, Princess Suddha Dibyaratana suffered from many ailments, including asthma. She died of pulmonary tuberculosis on 2 January 1922 at King Chulalongkorn Memorial Hospital in Bangkok.

== Royal decorations ==
- Dame of The Ancient and Auspicious Order of the Nine Gems: received 9 August 1906
- Dame of The Most Illustrious Order of the Royal House of Chakri: received 6 January 1887
- Dame Cross of the Most Illustrious Order of Chula Chom Klao (First class): received 26 November 1893
- King Rama IV Royal Cypher Medal, Second Class
- King Rama V Royal Cypher Medal, First Class
- King Rama VI Royal Cypher Medal, First Class
