= Kashemsanta Sobhaga =

- Prince Phromwaranurak
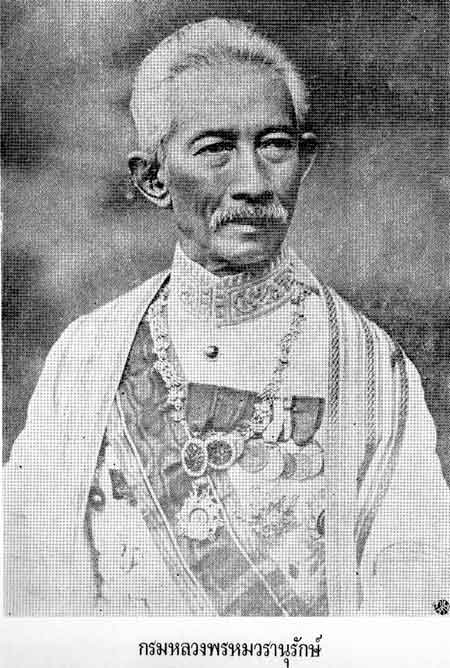
- Born: 18 August 1856; Bangkok, Siam
- Died: 4 January 1924 (aged 67); Bangkok, Siam
- Spouse: List of spouses: Princess Chaeng Ninlarat; Yaem Asuni; Sutti; Nin; Chiam Khotchaseni; Malai; Pao Asuni; Lamai Suriyakun; Nuan; Thongsuk; An; Huang Palakawong na Ayutthaya; Pluem; Nuanchan Itsarasena; Phian Ditthachai
- Issue: 39 sons and 22 daughters
Names
- Kashemsanta Sobhaga, the Prince Phromwaranurak
- House: Kashemsant Dynasty Chakri Dynasty
- Father: Mongkut (Rama IV)
- Mother: Phae Thammasarot

Prince Kashemsanta Sobhaga, the Prince Phromwaranurak (Thai: พระเจ้าบรมวงศ์เธอ พระองค์เจ้าเกษมสันต์โสภาคย์ กรมหลวงพรหมวรานุรักษ์; RTGS: Phrachao Boromwong Thoe Phra Ong Chao Kasemsan Sophak Krommaluang Phromwaranurak; 18 August 1856 – 4 January 1924) was a Prince of Siam (later Thailand), a member of the Siamese royal family, and a member of the House of Kashemsanta. He was a son of King Mongkut of Siam. He was the head of the Kashemsant dynasty.

His mother was Chao Chom Manda Pae Dharmasaroja, who was a daughter of Phra Samranharuethai (Uan Dharmasaroja) and Thao Songkandan (Si Dharmasaroja). He had 4 siblings, 2 elder sisters, 1 younger brother and 1 younger sister.

1. Princess Yingyaovalaksana Akkararajasuda (later Mom Ying)
2. Princess Bhaktra Bimalabarna
3. Prince Manusyanagamanop
4. Princess Banchob Benchama

Prince Kashemsanta Sobhaga died 4 January 1924 at the age 67.
