= Yaovamalaya Narumala =

Princess of Sawankalok (1873–1909)

- Princess of Sawankalok
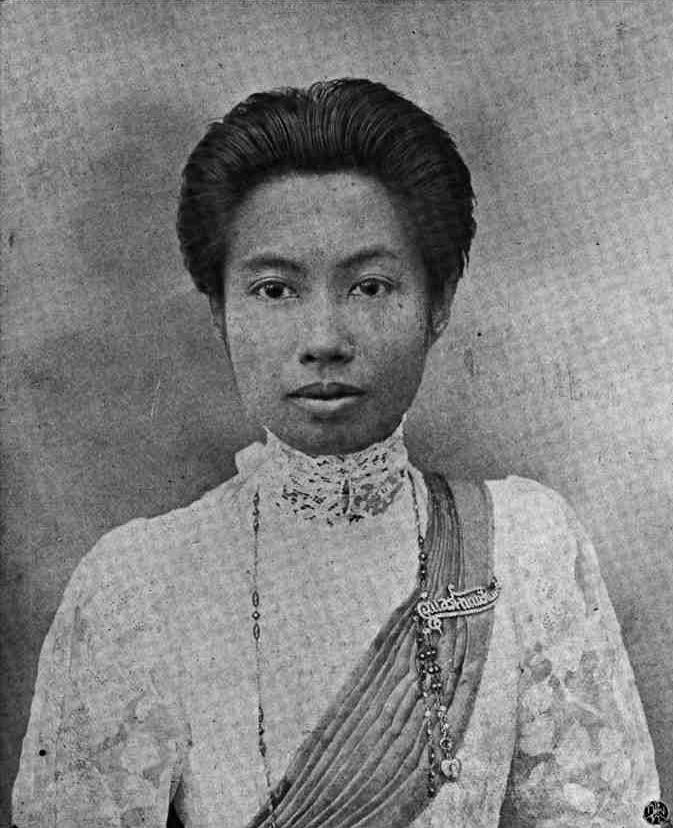
- Born: 4 June 1873; Grand Palace; Bangkok, Siam
- Died: 3 July 1909 (aged 36); Bangkok, Siam
Names
- Yaovamalaya Narumala Sabasakon Galyani
- House: Chakri dynasty
- Father: Chulalongkorn (Rama V)
- Mother: Ubolratana Narinaga

Yaovamalaya Narumala, Princess of Sawankhalok (Thai: เยาวมาลย์นฤมล; RTGS: Yaowamannaruemon; 4 June 1873–3 July 1909), was a Princess of Siam (later Thailand). She was a member of the Chakri dynasty of Thailand. She was the daughter of King Chulalongkorn.

Her mother was Ubolratana Narinaga, the Princess Akaravorarajgalya, daughter of Ladavalya, the Prince Bhumindrabhakdi and Mom Chin Ladavalya na Ayudhya. She was given full name by her father as Yaovamalaya Narumala Sabasakon Galyani (Thai: เยาวมาลย์นฤมล สรรพสกนธ์กัลยาณี)

She served as an executive vice-president of the Red Unalom Society, a humanitarian organisation (later the Thai Red Cross Society), founded by Queen Savang Vadhana as maternal patron. Queen Saovabha Phongsri was appointed its first president, and Plien Phasakoravongs acted as the society secretary. She worked as an executive vice-president with the other princesses:

- Queen Sukhumala Marasri
- Suddha Dibyaratana, the Princess Sri Ratanakosindra
- Chandra Saradavara, the Princess of Phichit
- Srivilailaksana, the Princess of Suphan Buri
- Ubolratana Narinaka, the Princess Akaravorarajgalya
- Saisavalibhirom, the Princess Suddhasininat Piyamaharaj Padivaradda
- Chao Chom Manda Kesorn (Rama V)

On 21 May 1905, she was given the royal title from her father, that of Princess of Sawankhalok (Thai: กรมขุนสวรรคโลกลักษณวดี). She was given the rank of Krom Khun, the fourth level of the Krom ranks.

Princess Yaovamalaya Narumala died on 3 July 1909, at the age of 36.

== Ancestry ==
Ancestor of Princess Yaovamalaya Narumala, the Princess of Sawankalok Laksanavadi
Princess Yaovamalaya Narumala, the Princess of Sawankalok	Father: Chulalongkorn, King Rama V of Siam	Paternal Grandfather: Mongkut, King Rama IV of Siam	Paternal Great-grandfather: Buddha Loetla Nabhalai, King Rama II of Siam
Princess Yaovamalaya Narumala, the Princess of Sawankalok	Father: Chulalongkorn, King Rama V of Siam	Paternal Grandfather: Mongkut, King Rama IV of Siam	Paternal Great-grandmother: Queen Sri Suriyendra
Princess Yaovamalaya Narumala, the Princess of Sawankalok	Father: Chulalongkorn, King Rama V of Siam	Paternal Grandmother: Queen Debsirindra	Paternal Great-grandfather: Prince Sirivongse, the Prince Matayabidaksa
Princess Yaovamalaya Narumala, the Princess of Sawankalok	Father: Chulalongkorn, King Rama V of Siam	Paternal Grandmother: Queen Debsirindra	Paternal Great-grandmother: Mom Noi Sirivongs na Ayudhya
Princess Yaovamalaya Narumala, the Princess of Sawankalok	Mother: Princess Ubolratana Narinaka, the Princess Akaravorarajgalya	Maternal Grandfather: Prince Ladavalya, the Prince Bhumindrabhakdi	Maternal Great-grandfather: Nangklao, King Rama III of Siam
Princess Yaovamalaya Narumala, the Princess of Sawankalok	Mother: Princess Ubolratana Narinaka, the Princess Akaravorarajgalya	Maternal Grandfather: Prince Ladavalya, the Prince Bhumindrabhakdi	Maternal Great-grandmother: Chao Chom Manda Emnoi
Princess Yaovamalaya Narumala, the Princess of Sawankalok	Mother: Princess Ubolratana Narinaka, the Princess Akaravorarajgalya	Maternal Grandmother: Mom Chin Ladavalya na Ayudhya	Maternal Great-grandfather: unknown
Princess Yaovamalaya Narumala, the Princess of Sawankalok	Mother: Princess Ubolratana Narinaka, the Princess Akaravorarajgalya	Maternal Grandmother: Mom Chin Ladavalya na Ayudhya	Maternal Great-grandmother: unknown
