= Wat Niwet Thammaprawat =

Thai Buddhist Temple in Gothic Revival style

- วัดนิเวศธรรมประวัติ
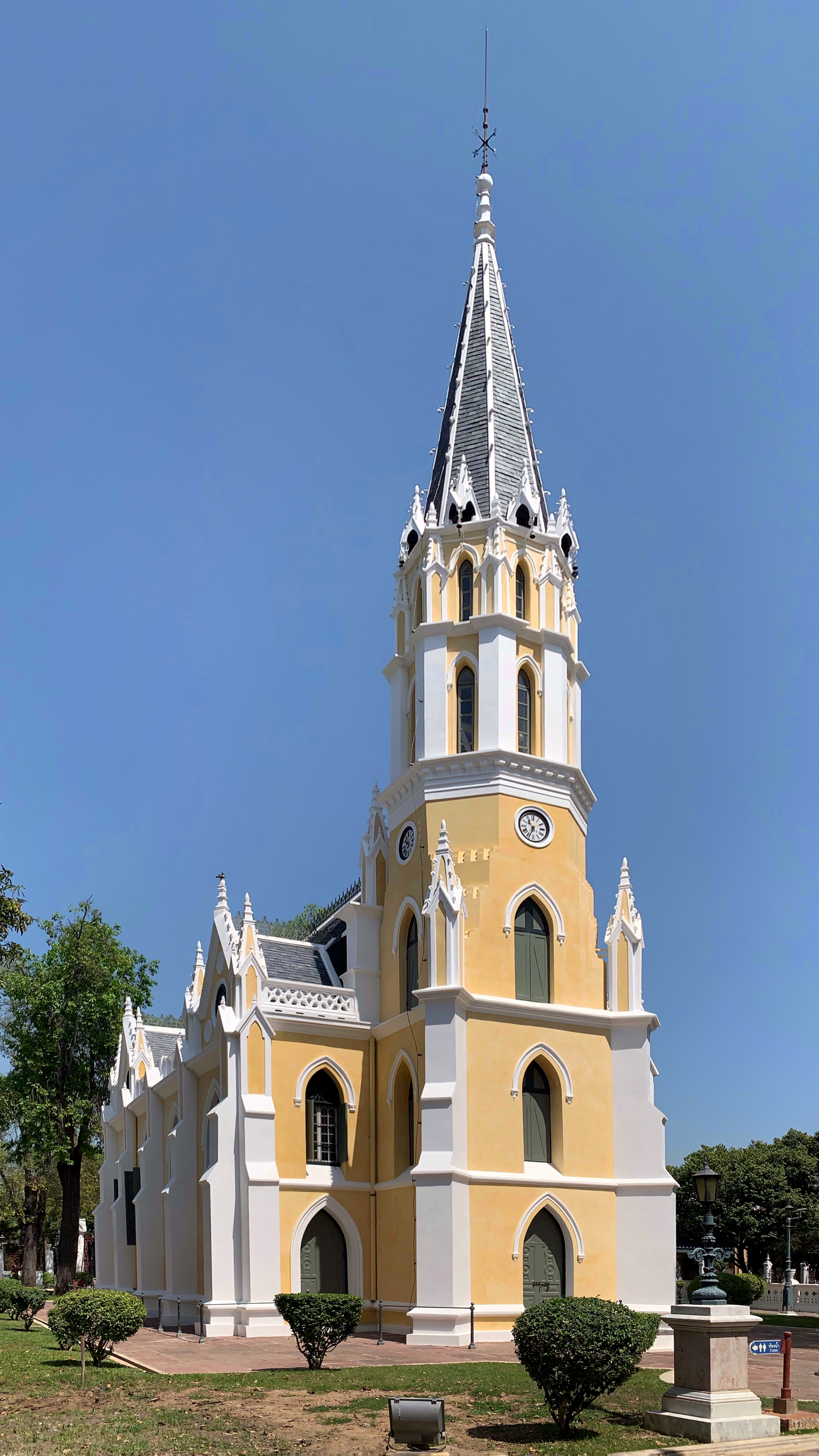
- South facade of the temple's ubosot with its iconic spire

Religion
- Affiliation: Buddhist
- Sect: Dhammayut

Location
- Location: Mu 12, Ban Len Subdistrict, Bang Pa-in District, Phra Nakhon Si Ayutthaya Province, Thailand
- Interactive map of Wat Niwet Thammaprawat
- Coordinates: 14°13′53″N 100°34′34″E

Architecture
- Architect: Joachim Grassi
- Style: Gothic Revival
- Founder: King Chulalongkorn
- Groundbreaking: 1876
- Completed: 1878

Wat Niwet Thammaprawat Ratchaworawihan (Thai: วัดนิเวศธรรมประวัติราชวรวิหาร) is a Buddhist temple (wat) of the Dhammayut Order, located within the grounds of the Bang Pa-In Royal Palace in Thailand's Phra Nakhon Si Ayutthaya Province. Founded in 1878, it is remarkable among Thai Buddhist temples in that its architecture mimics that of a European church, being built in the Gothic Revival style.

== History ==
The construction of Wat Niwet Thammaprawat was commissioned by King Chulalongkorn (Rama V) in 1876, to serve as the royal temple for the newly expanded Bang Pa-In Palace. The temple was designed by Joachim Grassi, one of the first Italian architects employed under the king's government. Many public buildings were built in the Western style during Chulalongkorn's reign, a trend reflecting the modernisation of Siam (as Thailand was then known) at the time. Wat Niwet Thammaprawat was built in Gothic Revival style, with stained glass windows and a Gothic altar. Its appearance resembles that of a Christian church, with the temple's main Buddha image in place of a Cross. Construction was completed in 1878.

== Status and location ==
Wat Niwet Thammaprawat is a royal temple, first-class, of the ratchaworawihan type, and is one of the sixteen temples which receive annual royal kathina offerings. It falls under the Dhammayut Order of Thai Theravada Buddhism. It is a registered historic monument, and received the ASA Architectural Conservation Award in 1989.

The temple is located on an island of the Chao Phraya River, next to Bang Pa-in Royal Palace, in Ban Len Subdistrict, Bang Pa-in District, Phra Nakhon Si Ayutthaya Province. It is nowadays accessible by a cable car from the palace.

== See also ==
- Buddhism in Thailand
- List of Buddhist temples in Thailand
- Holy Redeemer Church, Bangkok - a Catholic church built in Thai style
