= Chao Phraya Surawong Waiyawat =

Siamese diplomat and defense minister (1828–1888)

- เจ้าพระยาสุรวงศ์ไวยวัฒน์
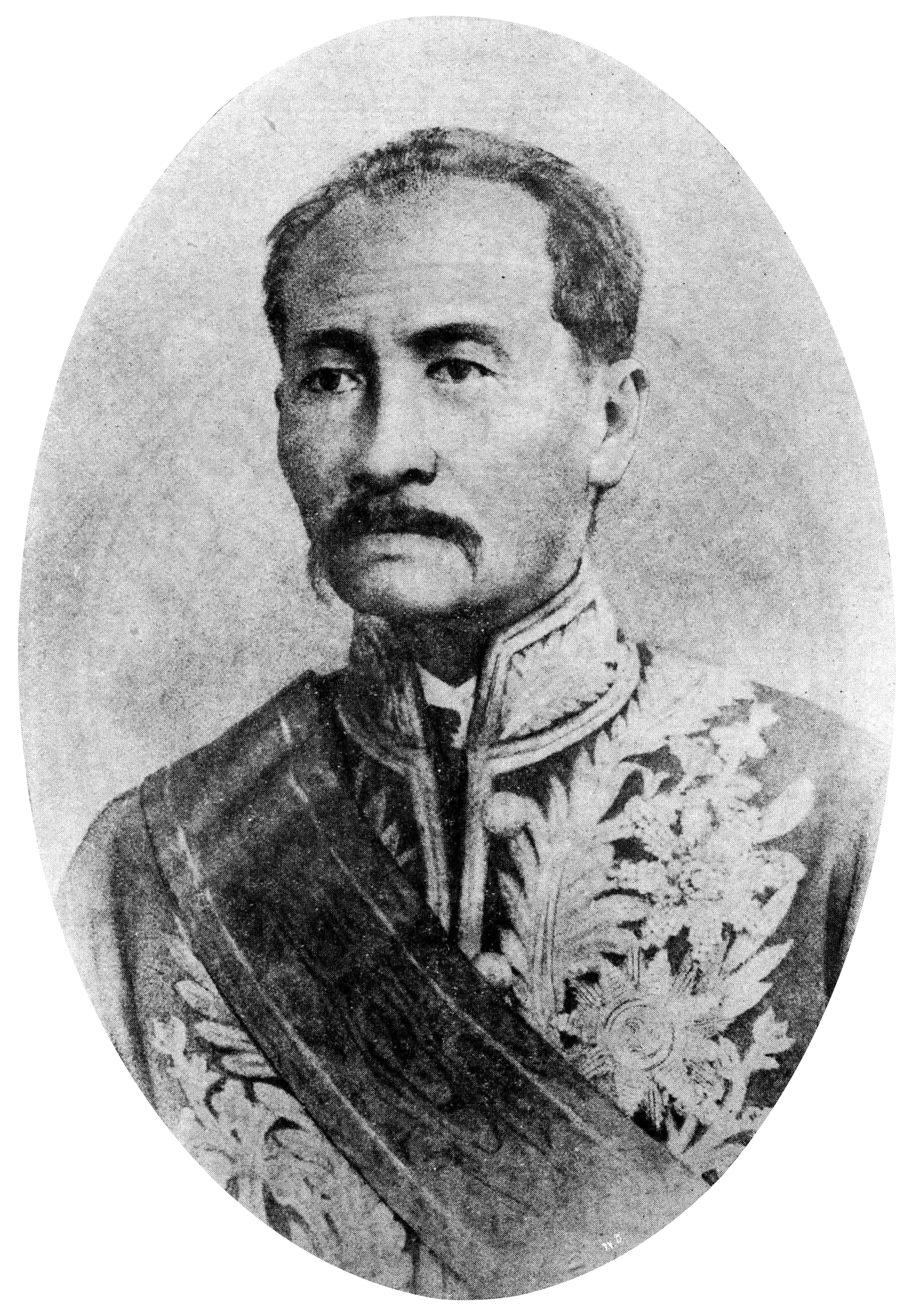

Personal details
- Born: July 2, 1828
- Died: October 30, 1888 (aged 60)
- Children: 65
- Parents: Somdet Chao Phraya Borom Maha Sri Suriwongse (father); Than Phu Ying Klin (mother)

Chao Phraya Surawong Waiyawat (Thai: เจ้าพระยาสุรวงศ์ไวยวัฒน์ (วร บุนนาค); 2 July 1828 – 30 October 1888) was the eldest son of Somdet Chao Phraya Borom Maha Sri Suriwongse and Than Phu Ying Klin.

== Life ==
He started his service from the reign of King Nangklao. Later, in the reign of King Mongkut, he became Chao Muen Vaiwaranart, the head of the ten thousand servants. as chargé d'affaires, followed Phraya Sriphiphat (Pae Bunnag), who is the ambassador established diplomatic relations in Paris, Second French Empire in 1860. Later, he was graciously pleased conferred a title as Phraya Surawongwaiwat, Chamberlain and was for an ambassador to France once again to meet with Emperor Napoleon III in 1866.

In the early reign of King Chulalongkorn, he graciously promoted the title of Chao Phraya Surawongwaiwat at Samuha Phra Kalahom, Fief 10,000. In 1869, he held the position of Samuha Phra Kalahom for 19 years until his death in 1888. People commonly called Chao Khun Thahan or Chao Khun Kalahom and this name became the name of King Mongkut's Institute of Technology Ladkrabang later.
