= Ubolratana Narinaga =

- Princess Argavoraraja Kalya
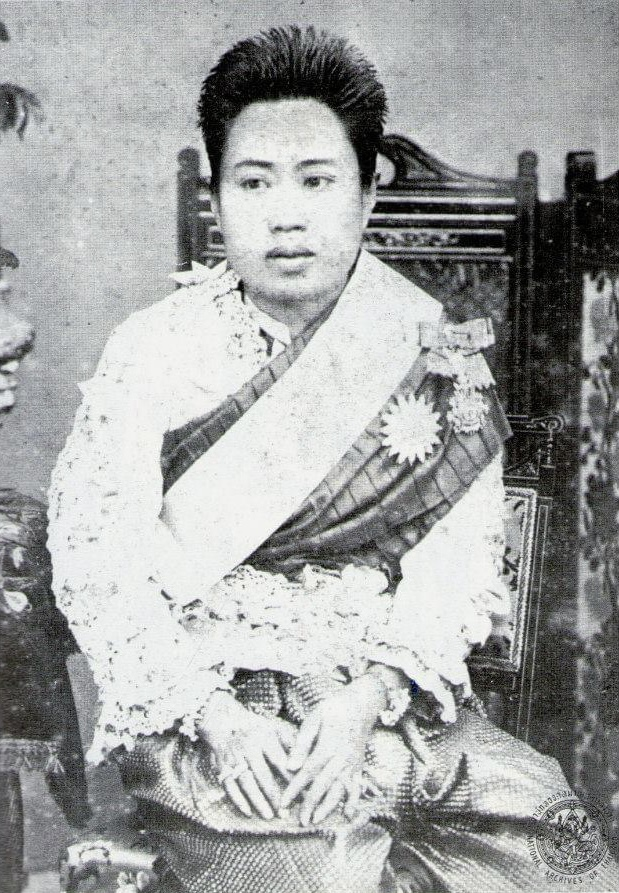

Princess consort of Siam
- Tenure: 1872 – 15 October 1901
- Born: Bua Ladavalya; 28 November 1846; Bangkok, Siam
- Died: 15 October 1901 (aged 54); Bangkok, Siam
- Spouse: Chulalongkorn (Rama V)
- Issue: Yaovamalaya Narumala
- Dynasty: Chakri
- Father: Ladavalya, Prince Bhumindra Bhakdi
- Mother: Chin

Ubolratana Narinaga, Princess Argavoraraja Kalya (Thai: อุบลรัตนนารีนาค, RTGS: Ubonrat Narinak, Uppalaratananārīnāga), born Princess Bua Ladavalya (Thai: บัว ลดาวัลย์; RTGS: Bua Ladawan; 28 November 1846 – 15 October 1901) was a consort of Chulalongkorn, the King of Siam.

She was a daughter of Ladavalya, Prince Bhumindra Bhakdi and Lady Chin.
