= Sukhumabhinanda =

Thai prince (1923–2003)

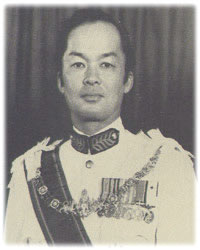
- Born: 15 November 1923; Bangkok, Siam
- Died: 10 April 2003 (aged 79); Bangkok, Thailand
- Spouse: Mom Dusadee Boriphat Na Ayutthaya
- Issue: Sukhumbhand Paribatra; Varoros Paribatra
Names
- – Prince (Mom Chao); Sukhumabhinanda Paribatra: 15 November 1923 – 8 November 1927 – Prince Sukhumabhinanda: 8 November 1927 – 10 April 2003
- House: Paribatra family (Chakri dynasty)
- Father: Prince Paribatra Sukhumbandhu, the Prince of Nakhon Sawan
- Mother: Sombandh Palakawong na Ayudhaya

Prince Sukhumbhinanda or Phra Vorawongse Ther Phra Ong Chao Sukhumabhinanda (RTGS: Sukhumaphinan) (Thai: พระวรวงศ์เธอ พระองค์เจ้าสุขุมาภินันท์) (15 November 1923 – 10 April 2003) was a Prince of Thailand, a member of the Thai royal family. He was a member of the House of Paribatra (th: ราชสกุลบริพัตร), the royal house descended from Chakri dynasty. He was the direct grandson of King Chulalongkorn (Rama V).

== Biography ==
He was born on 15 November 1923. He was the third son of Prince Paribatra Sukhumbandhu, the Prince of Nakhon Sawan (son of King Chulalongkorn (Rama V the Great) and Queen Sukhumala Marasri) and Mom Sombhand Paribatra na Ayudhya (née Palkavongse na Ayudhya, daughter of Mom Luang Chum Palkavongse). After born, he was titled Mom Chao (Prince) Until in the reign of King Prajadhipok (Rama VII), he was elevated into Phra Vorawongse Ther Phra Ong Chao; (Prince) on 8 November 1927. He had an elder sister; Princess Induratana.

As a surviving male descendant of Queen Sukhumala Marasri, the Prince was a potential heir to the Thai throne, according to the 1924 Palace Law of Succession. Prince Sukhumabhinanda did his royal duty as the secretary of Thai Red Cross Society between 1968 and 1969 and later he became the vice-president of the Thai Red Cross between 1969 and 1973.

== Marriage ==
He married Dusdi na Thalang. After marriage, his wife got the title Mom, which is the title for Thai princes' commoner wives. The couple had 2 sons;

- Mom Rajawongse Sukhumbhand Paribatra (born 22 September 1952), thai politician, a Member of parliament of the Democrat Party. And was elected as the 15th Governor of Bangkok. Married firstly with Nuchwadi Bamrungtrakul and secondly with Savitri Paribatra na Ayudhya, has 2 sons;
  - Mom Luang Binitbhand Paribatra (born 5 November 1980)
  - Mom Luang Varabhinanda Paribatra (born 17 August 1993)
- Mom Rajawongse Varoros Paribatra (born 5 November 1959), married firstly with Nanthini Sirisingha, secondly with Pathanaphorn Niyonsiri, and thirdly with La-ongdao Paribatra na Ayudhya; has 2 sons and 1 daughter.
  - Mom Luang Vorabinit Paribatra (born 29 May 1990)
  - Mom Luang Subhanan Paribatra (born 20 June 1998)
  - Mom Luang Varodaya Paribatra (born 21 November 1999)

Prince Sukhumabhinanda died on 10 April 2003, at the age of 79.

== Royal decorations ==
- Knight Cross of the Most Illustrious Order of Chula Chom Klao (First Class)
- Knight Grand Cordon of the Most Exalted Order of the White Elephant
- Knight Grand Cordon of the Most Noble Order of the Crown of Thailand
- King Rama IX the Great Royal Cypher Medal

Sukhumabhinanda House of Paribatra Cadet branch of the House of Chakri Born: 15 November 1923 Died: 10 April 2003
Civic offices
Preceded by Prangsong Sukhum	Secretary of Rural Development; 1968 – 1971	Succeeded by Withun Chakkaphak
Non-profit organization positions
Preceded by Phra Trironnasanwisawakam	Vice President of Thai Red Cross Society; 1919 – 1923	Vacant Kasrt Snidvongs Title next held by Sirindhorn
