= Induratana Paribatra =

Thai princess (1922–2026)

- อินทุรัตนา บริพัตร
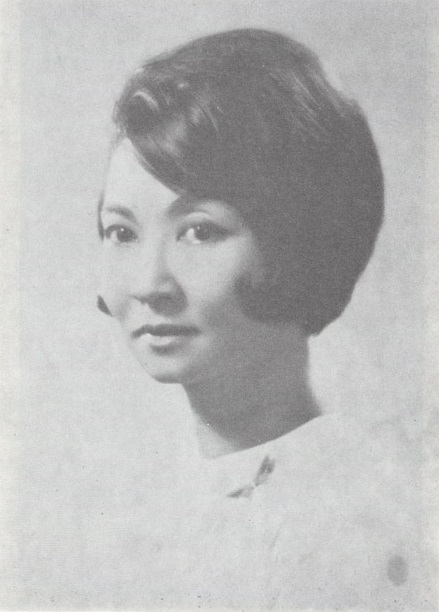
- Princess Induratana in the 1950s
- Born: 2 February 1922; Bangkok, Siam
- Died: 5 January 2026 (aged 103); Bangkok, Thailand
- Spouse: Somwang Sarasas (m. 1953, divorced)
- Parents: Paribatra Sukhumbandhu, Prince of Nakhon Sawan (father); Sombandh Palakawong na Ayudhaya (mother)

Signature
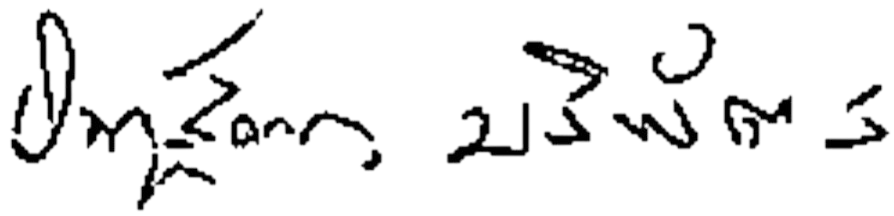

Induratana Paribatra (Thai: อินทุรัตนา บริพัตร; RTGS: Inthurattana Boriphat; 2 February 1922 – 5 January 2026) was a descendant of the royal family of Thailand, a granddaughter of King Chulalongkorn.

== Background ==
Princess Induratana was the ninth child of Paribatra Sukhumbandhu, Prince of Nakhon Sawan (commander of the Thai Army and Navy under his half brother, King Vajiravudh), and the first child of Paribatra's commoner second wife Sombandh (née Palakawong na Ayudhaya). She had one younger brother, Prince Sukhumabhinanda, as well as several older half-brothers and half-sisters. She was titled Her Highness (พระวรวงศ์เธอ Phra Worawong Thoe) in the reign of King Prajadhipok, Rama VII (1927).

== Marriage ==
Induratana married Somwang Sarasas on 4 February 1953, and relinquished her royal titles. Somwang Sarasas (née Sundananda) was the older brother of Ngarmchit Purachatra na Ayudhaya, wife of Induratana's cousin, Prince Prem Purachatra. She and Sarasas had three children. Later, they divorced.

1. Thoranin Sarasas married Sunittra Rueangsomwong
2. Sinnapa Sarasas married Anan Taratai
3. Santi Sarasas (né Phayanin) married Sureerat Sidaworapong

== Death ==
Induratana died on 5 January 2026, at the age of 103.
