= Mom Dusadee Paribatra Na Ayudhya =

Thai noblewoman, writer, teacher, translator, and composer (1924–2015)

Princess Mom Dusadee Paribatra Na Ayutthaya Second Class Chula Chom Klao (T.C.) The Most Exalted Order of the White Elephant (B.C.)
- หม่อมดุษฎี บริพัตร ณ อยุธยา
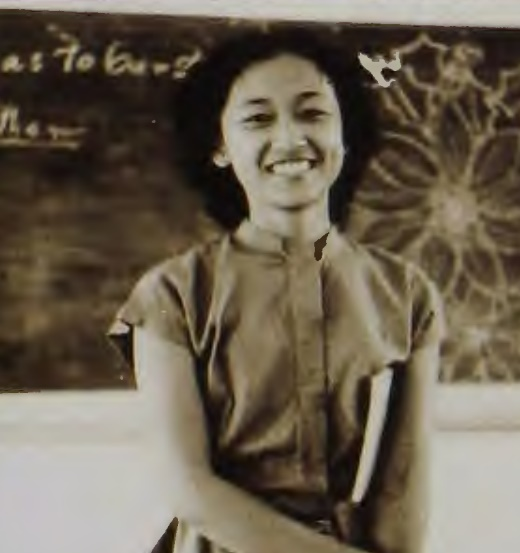
- Mom Dusadee in 1940
- Born: Dusadee Na Thalang; December 14, 1924; Phuket Province
- Died: September 5, 2015 (aged 90); Siriraj Hospital, Bangkok, Thailand
- Occupations: Writer, Teacher, Translator, and Composer
- Spouse: Sukhumabhinanda (1951–2003, his death)
- Children: Mom Rajawongse Sukhumbhand Paribatra; Mom Rajawongse Wororos Paribatra
- Parent(s): Luang Isarasaraksa (father); Dr. Darun Isarasaraksa (mother)

Mom Dussadee Paribatra na Ayudhya (maiden surname: Na Thalang; December 14, 1924 – September 5, 2015) was a Thai writer, teacher, translator, and composer of children's songs. She was the director of the Early Childhood Development Center. She was married to HRH Prince Sukhumabhinanda and is the mother of Mom Sukhumbhand Paribatra, the former governor of Bangkok.

== Early life and education ==
Mom Dusadee was born Dusadee Na Thalang in Phuket Province, the daughter of Luang Isarasaraksa (Pleum Na Thalang) and Darun Isarasaraksa. Her mother was a teacher.

Completed primary education at Plook Panya School, Phuket Province, secondary education at Mater Dei School. Higher education, Bachelor of Arts (Honors) and Associate Degree in Education (M.Ed.) from Chulalongkorn University in 1947. Later, received a scholarship from the Teachers Council to study in the United States, earning a Master's Degree in Child Development and Associate Degree in Childcare from Mills College in California.

== Career ==
Mom Dusdee established a school called Somprasong School, located in Soi Petchburi 13 in her home area. This school no longer exists. Mom Dusadee initiated the campaign for the use of picture books for children. She also wrote teaching manuals for early childhood teachers and children's reading books. The writing style used alliteration, words with rising and falling tones, and old words to help children learn, as well as using beautiful illustrations to stimulate the imagination of readers. She was the director of the Early Childhood Development Center.

== Personal life ==
She married to Her Royal Highness Princess Sukhumabhinanda, son of His Royal Highness Prince Paribatra Sukhumbandhu, Prince of Nakhon Sawan, and Mom Somphan Paribatra Na Ayutthaya on February 2, 1951. They had two children:

- Mom Rajawongse Sukhumbhand Boriphat married Nuchwadi Bamrungtrakul, later divorced, and married again to Savitri Boriphat Na Ayutthaya (maiden name: Phombut), with whom he had two children.
- Lieutenant General Mom Rajawongse Worarot Boriphat married Phatthanaphon Niyomsiri, later divorced, and married again to Woraphathip Boriphat Na Ayutthaya (formerly known as Laongdao Tocharoen). They have three children.

== Death ==
Mom Dussadee died of old age at approximately 3:00 AM on September 5, 2015 at Siriraj Hospital at the age of 90. The royal cremation ceremony was held on June 29, 2016 at Wat Thepsirinthrawat Ratchaworawihan, with Her Royal Highness Princess Maha Chakri Sirindhorn, along with Her Royal Highness Princess Soamsawali, Princess Suddhanarinatha, attending the ceremony.

== Books ==
Mom Dusadee has written and translated 46 books in total, including:

- Picture book for infants, Volume 1 (1955)
- Picture book for infants, Volume 2 (1955)
- Pla Boo Thong, Church Wall Edition (1961)
- Pla Boo Thong, a local novel version (1961)
- English Letter Writing Practice Book 1 (1961)
- English Letter Writing Practice Book 2 (1961)
- The Swallow (1962)
- Let's Sing and Dance (1963)
- Singing exercises according to international notes (1963)
- Exercises for making rhythms according to international notes (1963)
- The Reluctant Princess (1963; British version)
- Youth Song (1966)
- At the beach, clean sand (1966)
- The Golden Goby (1977; British version of Pla Boo Thong)
- Basic Music and Dance Teaching Plan (1979)
- For the Love of Ann (1979; translated from For the Love of Ann )
- Plearnkitployfan (1987)
- Ning Nong (1990)
- Help Me (1992; translated from Rescue)
- Potential to Genius (1996; translated from Free Flight)
- Learning to Learn, Towards Excellence (2006; translated from Learning To Learn)
- The Silence From Inner World (2016; translated from The Silence From Inner World of the Wild Needle Flower)
- Picture Dictionary (Ourselves) (Year unknown)
- Thai dance (year unknown)
- Folding a handkerchief (year unknown)

== Insignia ==
1971 - The Most Illustrious Order of Chula Chom Klao, Second Class (T.C.) (Female Officer)

1962 - The Most Exalted Order of the White Elephant, Fifth Class, Knight Grand Cross (KGE)
