= Karl Döhring =

German architect, art historian and archaeologist

Karl Siegfried Döhrin
- Born: August 14, 1879; Cologne, Kingdom of Prussia, German Empire
- Died: June 1, 1941 (aged 61); Darmstadt, Nazi Germany
- Writing career
- Pen name: Ravi Ravendr

Karl Siegfried Döhring (often misspelled Döring; 14 August 1879, in Cologne – 1 June 1941, in Darmstadt; also writing under the pseudonym Ravi Ravendro) was a German architect, art historian and archaeologist. He lived mostly in Siam, now called Thailand.

== Life and work ==
Döhring studied architecture in Berlin. He was fascinated by the rich art and architecture of Burma, and after completing his architectural studies in Berlin in 1905, he applied for a position with the Royal Siamese government in Bangkok. He began his work in July 1906 as an engineer with the Royal State Railways of Siam.

Between 1906 and 1912, he planned and supervised the construction of various railway buildings: including headquarters, crew accommodation, warehouses, a printing house and several train stations at Bangkok Noi (Thonburi), Phitsanulok, Phichit, Phichai (Tambon), Uttaradit and Sawankhalok. Besides his work for the Royal train, he also designed a number of homes and commercial buildings, some of which have not yet been identified.

In 1909, Döhring accepted a position as an architect and engineer with the Siamese Ministry of Interior. There, he made the acquaintance of many high-ranking officers of the ministry, and attracted the attention of members of the royal family who were working in the ministry - among them, Prince Damrong Rajanubhab, half brother of King Chulalongkorn and first interior minister of Thailand, and Dilok Nopparat, Prince of Siam. In his first two years at the Ministry, he was charged with designing and overseeing the construction of four major private buildings for members of the royal family. He built a residence for King Chulalongkorn in Phetchaburi, a palace for Prince Damrong, a palace for Prince Dilok and, for Queen Sukhumala Marasri, the sixth wife of Chulalongkorn, a residential building in the palace of her son, Prince Paribatra Sukhumbandhu (1881–1944), Field Marshal and Prince of Nakhon Sawan. He also was responsible for creating maps of Nakhon Pathom and Phetchaburi.

Unlike contemporary Western architects working in Siam at that time, Döhring's designs were not mere copies of European architectural style. Instead, he tried to combine Western and Thai architecture, adapting of old forms to new needs in a very personalized way. His buildings are individual, because they were "tailor-made" to the needs and expectations of his clients. The villa, for example, which he built for King Chulalongkorn in Phetchaburi, is a grand and imposing building. From a distance, it resembles the theaters of Oskar Kaufmann who was very popular in Germany at that time. The palace of Prince Damrong by contrast, is a work of simple elegance. For Prince Dilok, he used spare masculine lines. The residence of Queen Sukhumala Marasri captures the character of its female occupant - graceful and feminine.

The sudden death of his wife in 1911 was very hard on Döhring, and he detested the growing rivalry among foreigners in Siam. So he laid down his work for a year and traveled back to Germany. When he returned to Bangkok in 1913, the scope of his role with the Interior Ministry greatly expanded. In addition to his duties as an architect and engineer, he was tasked with archaeological excavations and assessments in some of the northern provinces of Siam. Some of the construction projects he drafted in those years were not realized - for example, the head office and hospital of the Royal Navy. Ultimately, the stress of overwork made Döhring seriously ill, and his doctors advised him to return to Germany.

After his health was restored, he hoped to return to Siam but the outbreak of World War I (1914–1918) made it impossible. After the war, he ended his career in architecture and worked as an art historian and archaeologist. He was a product designer, and also a translator of English and American literature. The depth of his knowledge and his passion for Siamese art, architecture and culture ensured that his books on Siam were well received in the West.

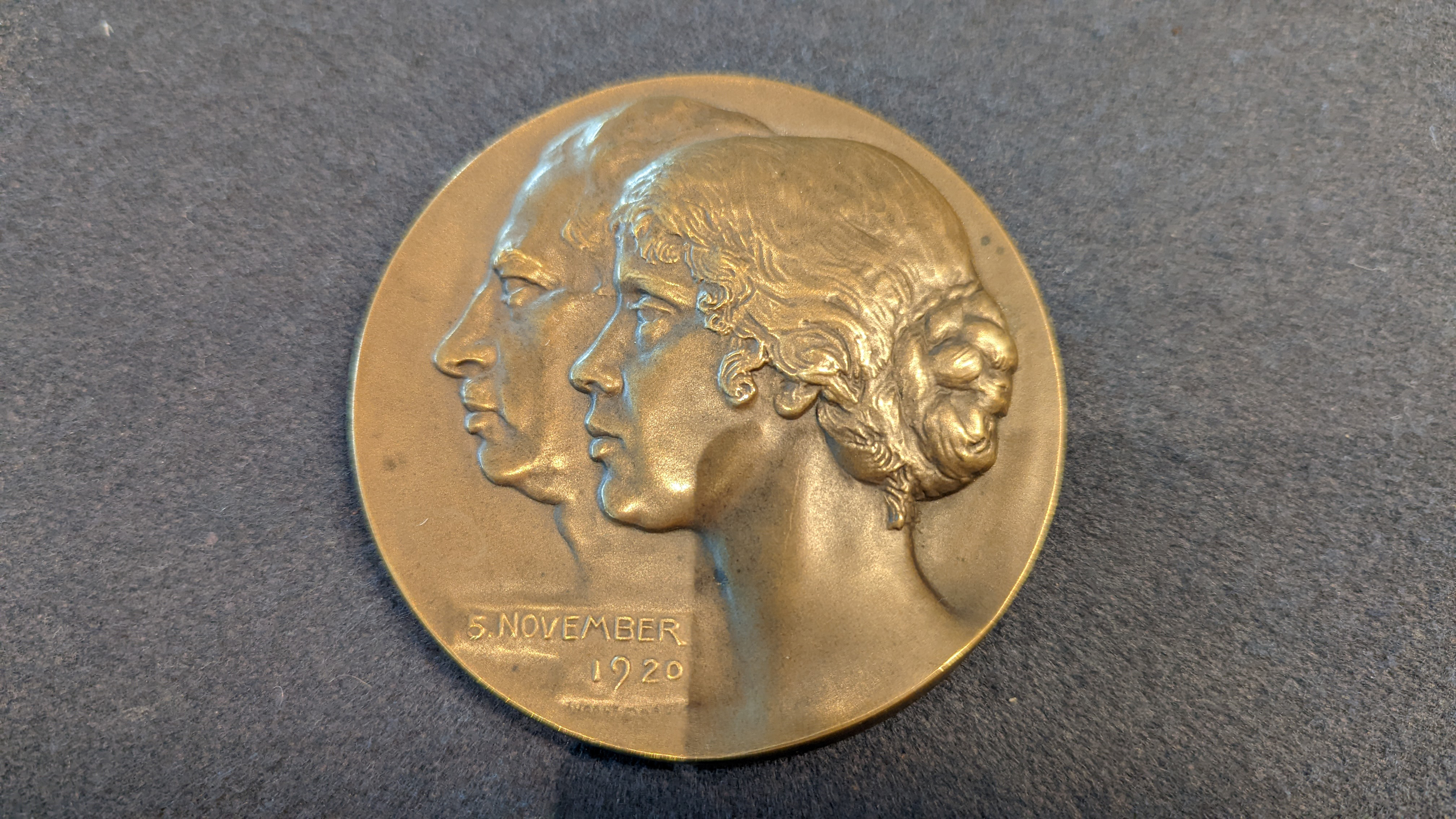
Bronze medal, cast by the Berlin sculptor Rudolf Marcuse, to commemorate the marriage of Karl Siegfried Döhring to Hedwig Maria Wagner.

On November 5, 1920, Karl Döhring married Hedwig Maria Wagner, born in 1898 in Nuremberg). There is a cast bronze medal of this wedding by the Berlin sculptor Rudolf Marcuse. Döhring led the life of a wealthy private scholar and the family lived in Seeheim Castle on Bergstrasse until his death. Hedwig Döhring supported her husband as a translator; together, for example, they translated the Rama legends and Rama reliefs in Indonesia by Willem Frederik Stutterheim, published by Georg Müller in Munich in 1925 .

Döhring died on 1 June 1941, at the age of 61, in a hospital in Darmstadt, Germany. In 1949, Hedwig Döhring moved to the United States to live near the family of Karl's brother, Erich Döhring. She was cared for by Karl's niece, Louise Döhring McClendon and died in November 1981 in Lawrence, KS.

== Historical and Cultural Background ==
During the reign of King Chulalongkorn (Rama V), the government of Siam was influenced and threatened by the major European colonial powers in Asia at the time. The king continued the reform policies initiated by his father which brought not only scientific, technical and economic progress to Siam, but also a more Western way of thinking and living.

A major part of his reform program was the modernization of the capital city, Bangkok. To impress Western visitors and dignitaries, the king had public buildings and royal palaces built in a style that combined historic European splendor with Asian architectural influences. For example, the Grand Palace in Bangkok - Chakri Maha Prasat - was built in the style of the Italian Renaissance, but at the request of Chulalongkorn a Siamese roof and Mondops were subsequently added. He believed that having Renaissance and Baroque style architecture would give Siam much needed recognition as a civilized nation among the European colonial powers - in effect persuading them to see Siam as an ally rather than a target for colonization. Chulalongkorn was interested in the European way of life - his living quarters in the Vimanmek Mansion in Bangkok District, Dusit, are a testament to that. His sons, who had been educated exclusively in Europe, also chose to build their palaces and villas in European style and followed the latest European fashions. In time, nobility, dignitaries and wealthy citizens began to imitate that royal example.

== Significant Buildings ==
- Old Thonburi railway station, 1900:

The station is located next to Sirirat Hospital in Bangkok on the west side of the river. It was the original starting point for the Western line to Petchaburi, and more recently the start of the line to Kanchanaburi. The building was built in 1900 but destroyed in World War II when it was used as a Japanese logistics base. In the Second World War, it was the Japanese as a logistics base used to and therefore could not escape its destruction. After the war, but was rebuilt in the same style and open again in 1950. In 2003, the railway station was decommissioned service transferred to the Bangkok Noi station, which was then renamed Thonburi. Much of the attached land was integrated into Sirirat Hospital. This building was used in Jackie Chan's movie "Around the World in 80 Days" (2003) as 'Agra Station'.

- Phitsanulok railway station, 1906 to 1912:

This striking building is modeled on central and southern German half-timbered buildings.

- Villa for King Chulalongkorn in Phetchaburi, 1910 to 1916:

The palatial Art Deco villa of King Chulalongkorn (Rama V) in the southeast of the metropolitan area of Phetchaburi, now lies within a military installation. It is formally called Phra Ram Ratchaniwet Palace, but is commonly referred to as Ban Puen Palace and occasionally, Ban Phra Ratchawang Peun. The building was commissioned by Chulalongkorn in 1910 and completed around 1916. From a distance, this Art Deco building resembles a theater by Oskar Kaufmann, who was very popular in Germany in those years. A green tiled staircase, supported by columns and topped by a partially glazed dome is the focal point of the building. The upstairs dining room is lined with yellow tiles. The building now houses a small exhibition, which includes Döring's original construction plans.

- Palace of Prince Damrong Rajanubhab, 1911:

The Varadis Palace, an unusual building with a Chinese-inspired interior, is found near busy Lan Luang Road, Bangkok. It was the former residence of Prince Damrong Rajanubhab, who played a significant role in the development of modern Thailand Prince Damrong (1862-1943) was a son of King Mongkut (Rama IV) and thus a younger half-brother of King Chulalongkorn (Rama V). He was deputy commander of the Army, Minister of Education and the first interior minister of Thailand in Döring's day. He wrote numerous books on history, literature, folklore and culture of Thailand and collected relevant literature and art. The Varadis Palace (pronounced wo-ra-dit) was built in 1911 and was renovated in 1996 on the occasion of the 53rd Anniversary of the death of Prince. It is now the Prince Damrong Rachanupab Museum and Library and has a collection of 7000 books in English and Thai. Prince Damrong was held under arrest in this palace during the coup of 24 June 1932. He died here on 1 December 1943.

- Palace of Prince Dilok Nopparat, 1909 to 1911
- Residence for Queen Sukhumala Marasri, begun between 1909 and 1911, presumed completed in 1913

The Somdej Residence is an outbuilding of the Bang Khun Phrom Palace, the former residence of Prince Paribatra Sukhumbhandhu, the 33rd son of King Chulalongkorn (1881-1944). It sits directly on the eastern bank of the Chao Phraya River, north of the modern Rama VIII Bridge. The main building of the small palace was built between 1901 and 1906 by the Italian architect Mario Tamagno. Charles Doring completed the Somdej Residence around 1913. This was the residence of the Prince's mother, Queen Sukhumala Marasri (1861-1927), sixth wife of King Chulalongkorn. Since 1945, these buildings have been owned by the Bank of Thailand. At first, it housed the headquarters of the bank, but was renovated in 1992 to serve as a museum on the history of Thai currency, the Bank of Thailand, the Bang Khun Phrom Palace, and the life and work of the Prince Paribatra. King Bhumibol Adulyadej opened the Bank of Thailand Museum, 9 January 1993.

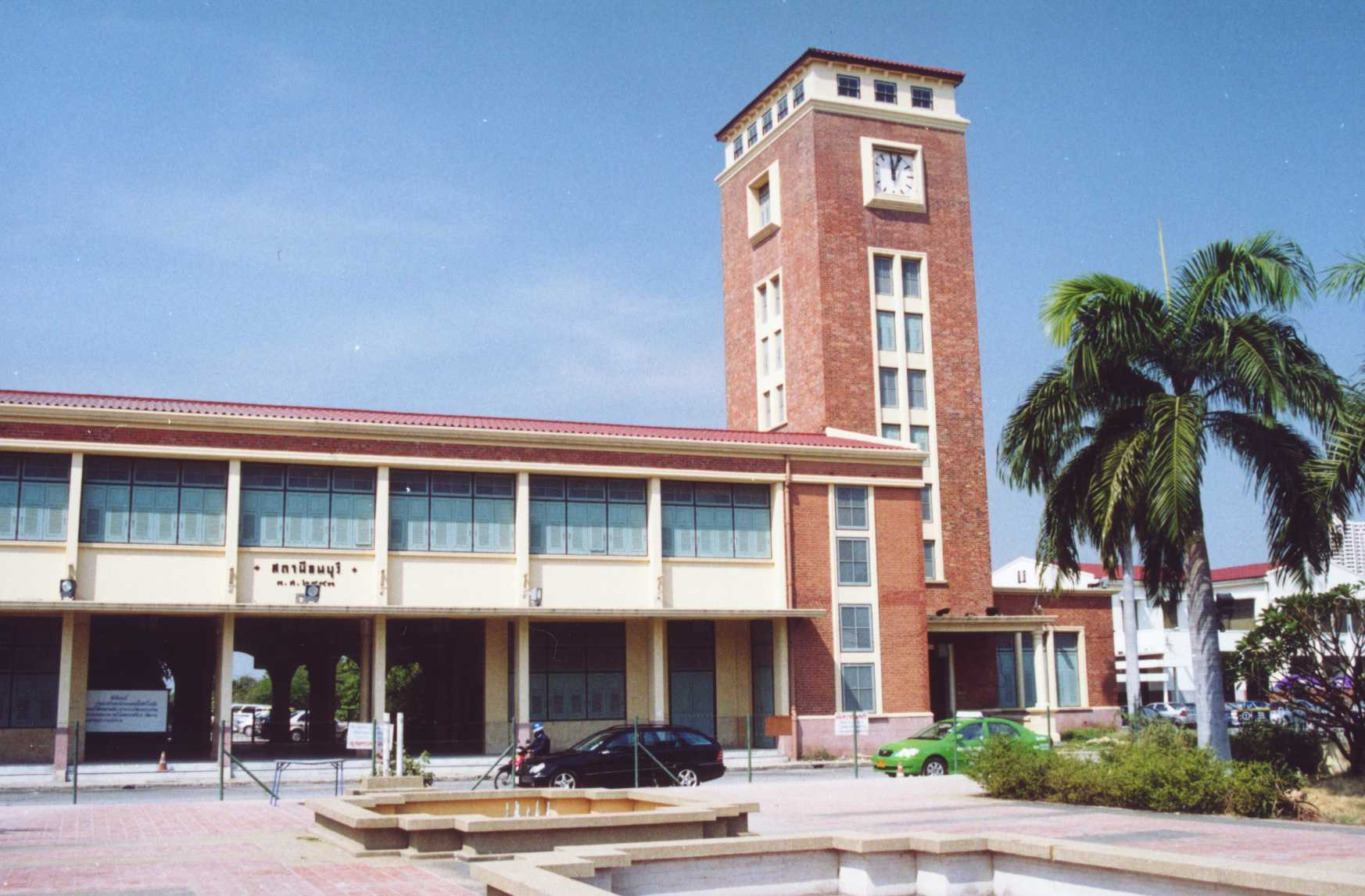
Bangkok Noi Railway Station

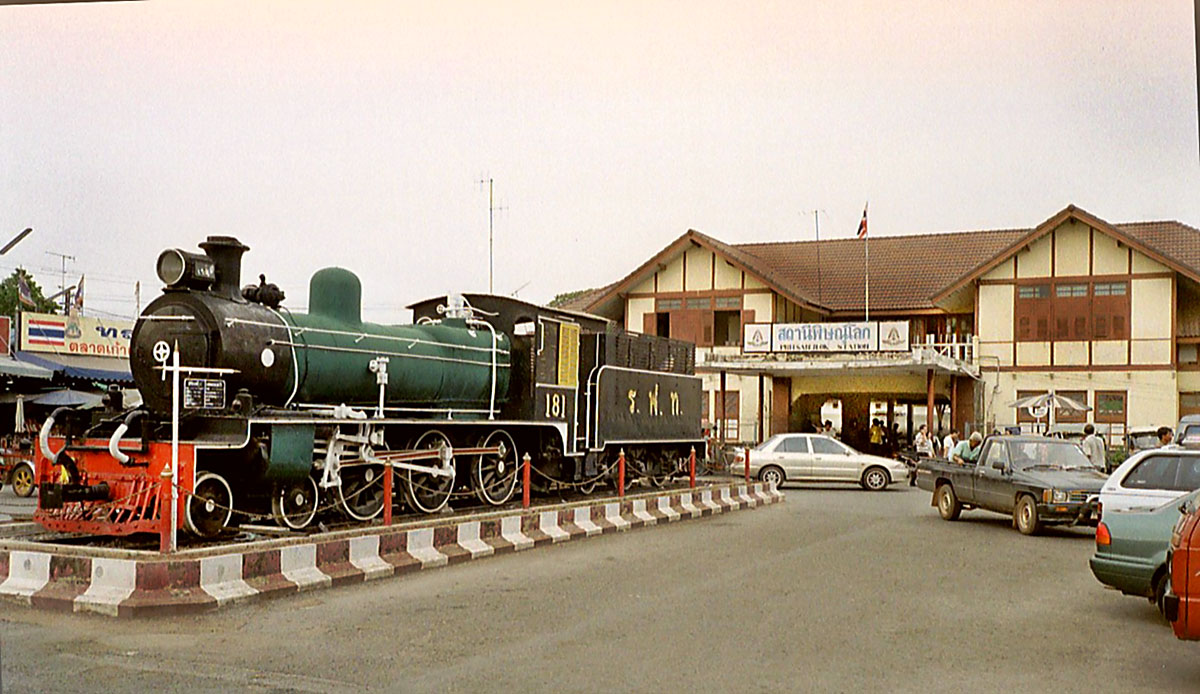
Central Station of Phitsanulok

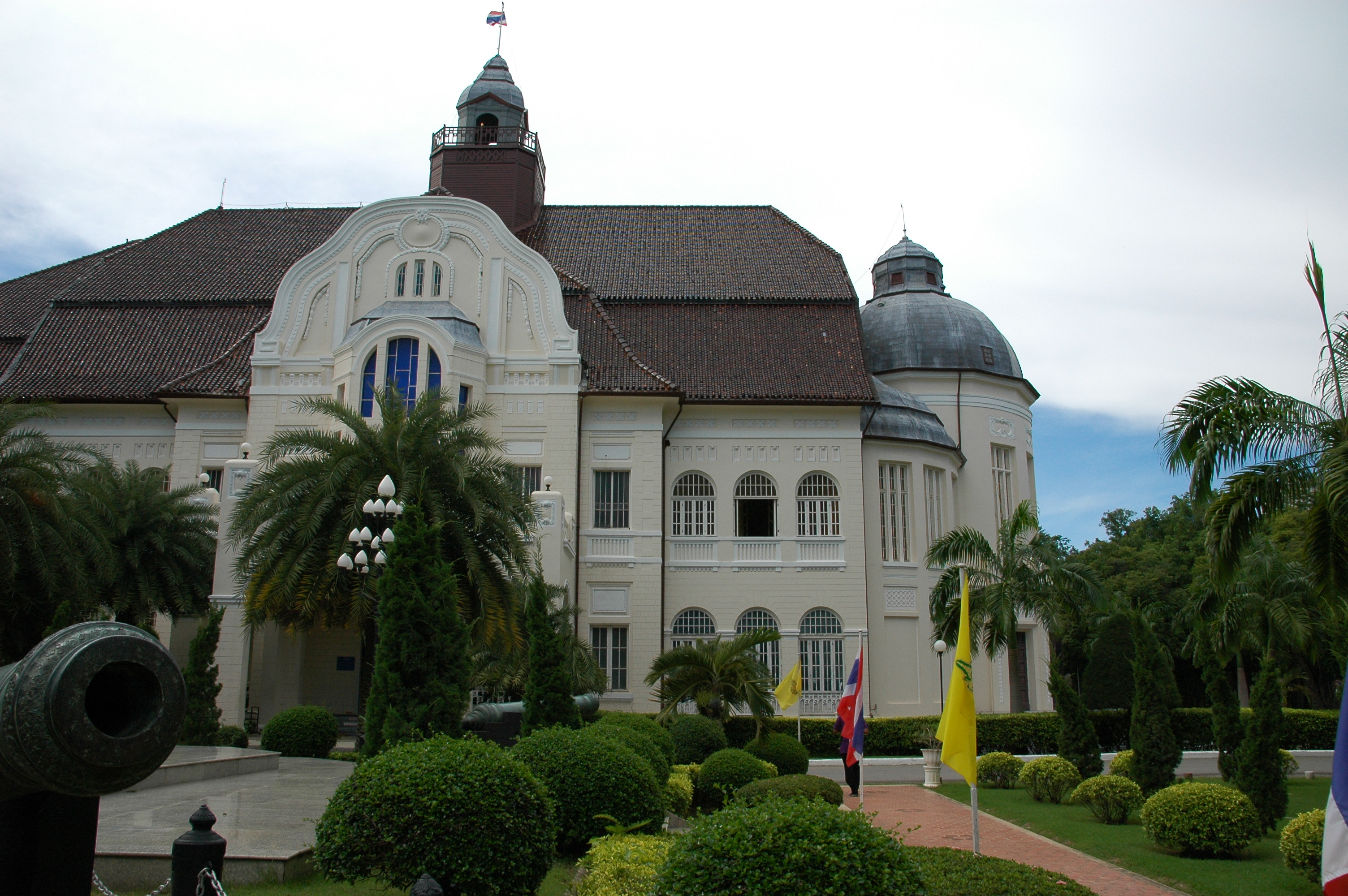
Phra Ram Ratchaniwet Palace in Phetchaburi

== Writings by Karl Döhring ==
- The Country and People of Siam. Reproduction of the English translation by White Lotus Press, Bangkok 1999, ISBN 974-8434-87-7
- Buddhist temples in Siam. Bangkok (Siam), Asia Publishing House, ndJ. and Berlin, Association Scientific Publishers, 1920, 3 volumes (Volume 1 with texts and drawings of temples, Volume 2-3 with numerous illustrations in color and b / w). Reproduction Bangkok, White Lotus Press, 2000.
- Buddhist Stupa (Phra Chedi) Architecture of Thailand, White Lotus, Bangkok 2000, ISBN 974-7534-39-8, reprint of The Prachedibau in Siam. In: Journal of Ethnology. 1912
- "Flucht aus Buddhas Gesetz", Copyright 1937 by Volksverband der Bücherfreunde, Wegweiser-Verlag G.m.b.H., Berlin.

== Literature about Karl Döhring ==
- Krisana Daroonthanom: Das architektonische Werk des deutschen Architekten Karl Döhring in Thailand. Logos Verlag, Berlin 1998.
- Krisana Honguthen: Karl Dohring and His Architecture in Siam. In: Muang Boran Journal. Volume 25, No. 1, January / March 1999.
