= Phra Ram Ratchaniwet =

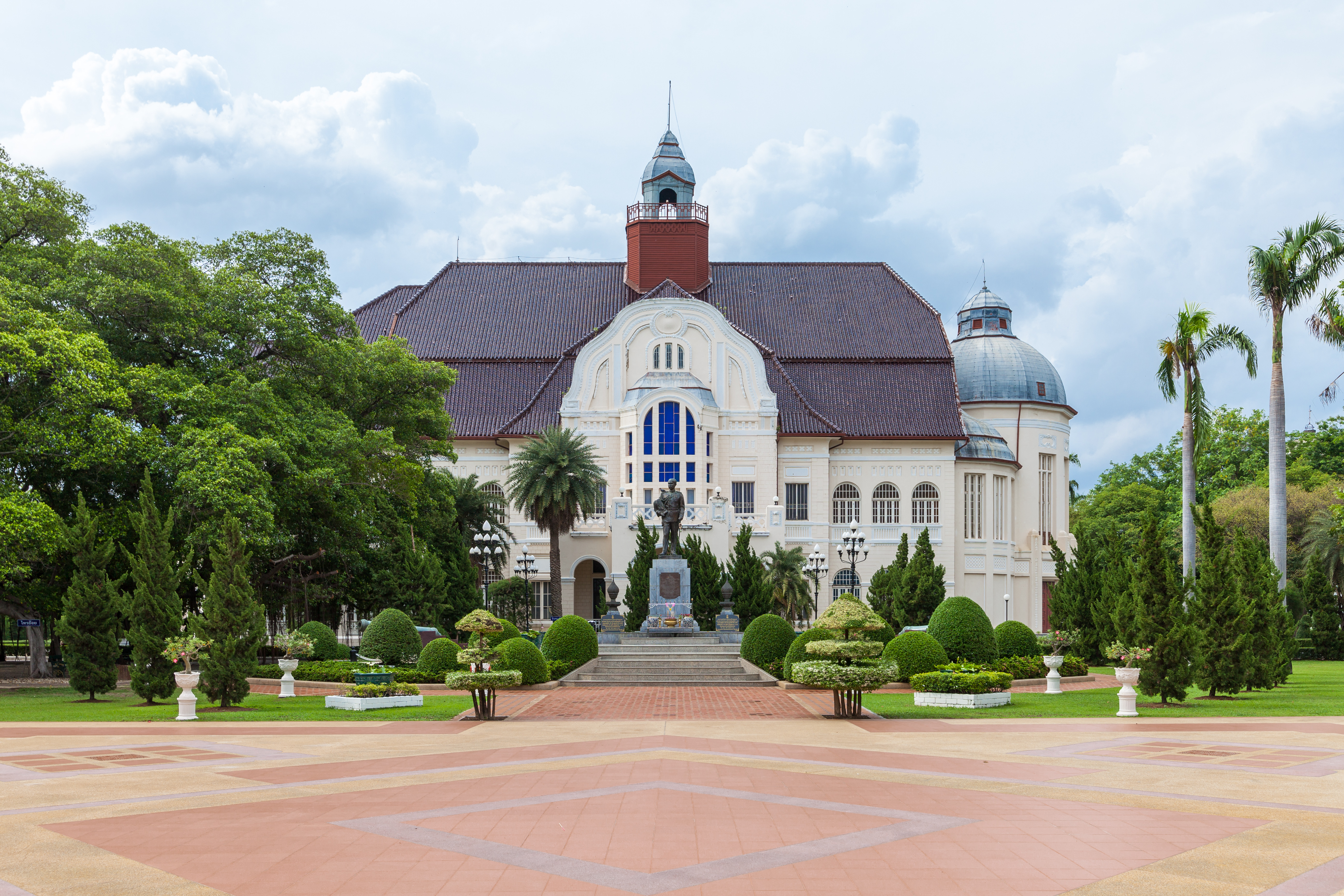
The palace in 2019

Phra Ram Ratchaniwet (Thai: พระรามราชนิเวศน์), also commonly known as Ban Puen Palace (พระราชวังบ้านปืน), is a former royal palace in Thailand's Phetchaburi Province. It now serves as a museum, operated by the Royal Thai Army.

== History ==
The palace was commissioned in 1910 by King Chulalongkorn, in order to serve as an alternative country residence to the royal palace of Phra Nakhon Khiri, whose hilltop location was becoming inconvenient. Construction commenced in 1910, but Chulalongkorn died the same year, before its completion. The palace was completed in 1916 in the reign of his successor, King Vajiravudh, who named it Phra Ram Ratchaniwet. It is also commonly known as Ban Puen after the village it is located in.

The palace, designed by the German architect Karl Döhring, is a two-storey building in Jugendstil or German Art Nouveau style. It has rectangular floor plan with a high mansard roof. The front façade features a large fractable, and a domed circular hall is attached to the right wing. A central courtyard, said to have housed the first badminton court in Thailand, today features a fountain.

The palace now serves as a museum, operated by the 15th Military Circle of the Royal Thai Army, which now owns the palace and the surrounding grounds. The building is a registered ancient monument, and received the ASA Architectural Conservation Award in 2000.
