= Sukhumbhand Paribatra =

Thai politician (born 1953)

Mom Rajawongse Sukhumbhand Paribatra
- สุขุมพันธุ์ บริพัตร
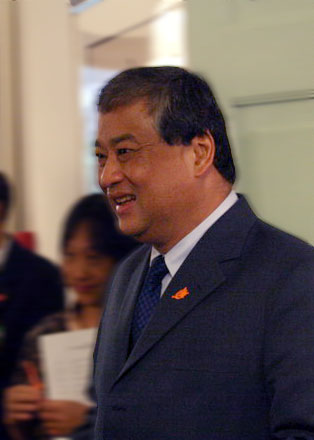
- Sukhumbhand in 2019

15th Governor of Bangkok
- In office 11 January 2009 – 18 October 2016
- Preceded by: Apirak Kosayodhin
- Succeeded by: Aswin Kwanmuang

Personal details
- Born: 22 September 1952 (age 74) Bangkok, Thailand
- Party: Democrat (1996–Present)
- Other political affiliations: Nam Thai (1994 - 1996)
- Spouses: Nuchwadi Bamrungtrakul (div.); Savitri Paribatra na Ayudhya
- Education: University of Oxford; Georgetown University
- Profession: Politician; political scientist; associate professor
- Religion: Buddhism

Mom Rajawongse Sukhumbhand Paribatra (Thai: ม.ร.ว.สุขุมพันธุ์ บริพัตร; RTGS: Sukhumphan Boriphat, Thai pronunciation: [sùʔkʰǔmpʰan bɔːríʔpʰát]; born 22 September 1952) is a Thai politician belonging to the Democrat Party. From 2009 to 2016 he was the Governor of Bangkok. He was removed from the post in October 2016 by Prime Minister Prayut Chan-o-cha who used Section 44 of the interim charter to remove the elected official. The reason given for his ouster was "...because he was involved in many legal cases." He was replaced by Police General Aswin Kwanmuang.

== Family ==
Sukhumbhand was born in Bangkok to Prince Sukhumabhinan and his commoner wife, Mom Dusadi Na Thalang. Prince Sukhumabhinan was himself a son of Prince Paribatra Sukhumbandhu, the Prince of Nakhon Sawan, a son of King Chulalongkorn (Rama V) with his Queen Consort Sukumalmarsri and an important minister of the royal government from 1926 until the end of absolute monarchy in 1932. Sukhumbhand was a first cousin once removed or nephew of King Bhumibol Adulyadej (because Bhumibol's father Prince Mahidol Adulyadej and his paternal grandfather, Prince Paribatra Sukhumbandhu are half-brothers, while Prince Sukhumabhinanda was an indirect first cousin of Bhumibol), in addition to being related to the current King Maha Vajiralongkorn and his sisters as a second-degree cousin. The title Mom Rajawongse reflects his royal descent as a great-grandchild of a monarch. Sukhumbhand is divorced from Nuchwadi Bamrungtrakul. His second wife is Savitri Paribatra na Ayudhya. He has two sons, one from each marriage.

Since 1986, Sukhumbhand has chaired the not-for-profit Chumbhot-Pantip Foundation.

== Education and academic career ==
Sukhumbhand attended Cheam School and Rugby School in England. He studied Philosophy, Politics and Economics (PPE) at the Pembroke College of University of Oxford, graduating with a bachelor's degree in 1977. He added post-graduate studies of international relations at Georgetown University in Washington, DC, which he completed with a master's degree.

From 1980 to 1996, he worked as an associate professor of political science at Chulalongkorn University in Bangkok. From 1987 to 1995, he directed the university's Institute of Security and International Studies. He served as advisor to the Thai House of Representatives' committee on foreign relations from 1987 to 1992, as policy advisor to Prime Minister Chatichai Choonhavan from 1988 to 1989, and as advisor to the house committee on parliamentary affairs from 1989 to 1991. From 1992 to 1993, he chaired the Ministry of Commerce's advisory board on international trade. He has taught as a visiting professor at Georgetown University and Columbia University. Sukhumbhand was a member of the Asia Society International Council and the International Institute for Strategic Studies (IISS).

== Political career ==
Sukhumbhand started his political career in the short-lived Nam Thai Party of which he was a founding member in 1994. He soon switched over to the Democrat Party. He was elected member of parliament for Bangkok in 1996 and 2001.

In 1999, when he was deputy foreign minister, he volunteered with a couple other Thai officials to take the place of 82 hostages taken at the Myanmar Embassy in Bangkok by armed gunmen from the "Virulent Burmese Student Warriors". All of the hostages were released unhurt because Sukhumbhand went in the helicopter with the gunmen so they would release all the hostages.

From 1997 to 2001, he served as deputy minister of foreign affairs. From 2002 to 2004, he chaired of the Council of Asian Liberals and Democrats. From 2005 to 2008, he was the deputy secretary-general of the Democrat Party. In 2007, he was re-elected to parliament on the party list.

Bangkok Governor Apirak Kosayodhin stepped down in late 2008, after the National Anti-Corruption Commission initiated proceedings against him. In the 11 January 2009 election, Sukhumbhand was elected his successor by a large margin, winning 45 percent of votes cast. After four years in office, he was re-elected on 3 March 2013. On 24 August 2016, he was suspended indefinitely by Thai Prime Minister Prayut Chan-o-cha.

== Honours ==
=== Thai honours ===
- Knight Grand Cordon (Special Class) of the Most Exalted Order of the White Elephant (1999)
- Knight Grand Cordon (Special Class) of the Most Noble Order of the Crown of Thailand (1998)
- Companion (Third Class, lower grade) of the Most Illustrious Order of Chula Chom Klao (1981)
- Member (Fifth Class) of the Most Admirable Order of the Direkgunabhorn (2011)
- First Class of the Boy Scout Citation Medal of Vajira (2009)

=== Foreign honours ===
- Denmark:
  - Grand Cross of the Order of the Dannebrog (2001)
- Portugal:
  - Grand Cross of the Order of Merit (1999)

== Ancestry ==
Ancestors of Sukhumbhand Paribatra

16. (=18.) Mongkut
8. Chulalongkorn
17. Debsirindra
4. Paribatra Sukhumbandhu, the Prince of Nakhon Sawan
18. (=16.) Mongkut
9. Sukumalmarsri
19. Samli Bunnag
2. Prince Sukhumabhinanda
20.
10. Lord Wathanyu Winitchai (Chum Palakawongse)
21.
5. Sombandh Palakawongse na Ayudhya
22. Lord Praphakonwong Worawutphakdi (Chai Bunnag)
11. Lian Bunnag
23. Chuen Bunnag
1. Sukhumbhand Paribatra
6. Lord Itsalet Raksa (Pleum Na Thalang)
3. Dutsadi Na Thalang
7. Darun Na Thalang

Political offices
Preceded by Apirak Kosayodhin	Governor of Bangkok; 2009–2016	Succeeded by Aswin Kwanmuang
