= Sukhothai Palace =

Thai royal residence in Bangkok

Coordinates: 13.7815°N 100.5097°E

Sukhothai Palace or Sukhodaya Palace (Thai: วังศุโขทัย; RTGS: Wang Sukhothai) is a royal residence situated on Samsen Road in Dusit District, Bangkok, Thailand. It is nearby to Dusit Palace and Vajira Hospital. The palace was the residence of King Prajadhipok (King Rama VII) and King Vajiralongkorn (King Rama X) before they ascended to the throne. It has since become the official residence of late Princess Bajrakitiyabha and Princess Sirivannavari.

== History ==
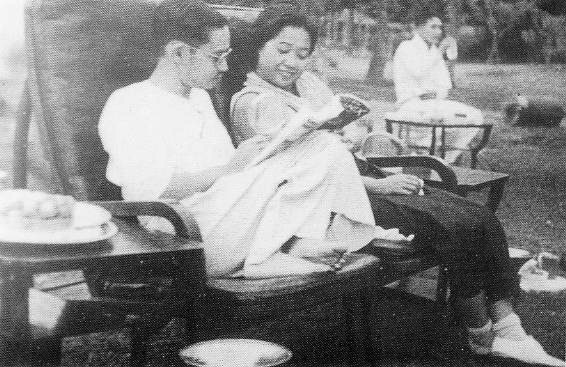
King Prajadhipok with Queen Rambai Barni at Sukhothai Palace

The palace was built in 1918. It was commissioned by Queen Saovabha, the wife of King Chulalongkorn as a wedding gift for her youngest son; Prince Prajadhipok, the Prince of Sukhothai and Rambhai Barni. King Vajiravudh bestowed the name "Sukhothai Palace" to the new residence.

Sukhothai Palace is regarded as a masterpiece of design in the combining of Western architecture with Thai decorative arts. The palace consists of three main buildings: the Yai Building, Mai Building and Nam building. All are connected together with via a raised walkway decorated with wood carvings and Thai patterned eaves. During various periods of ill health, Queen Saovabha often came to recuperate at the palace, which is located on the banks of the Samsen canal.

When Prajadhipok became king, the royal couple moved to the Amphorn Sathan Residential Hall, Dusit Palace for a period of time, however they then moved back to Sukhothai Palace. After the Siamese revolution of 1932 the royal couple went to England, Prajadhipok abdicating the throne in 1935. The king never returned and died in England on the 30 May 1941. During this period the palace became the property of the Crown Property Bureau and was used as a government office. In 1968 Queen Rambai Barni travelled back to Thailand permanently and the palace was returned to her. She lived at the palace until her death on the 22 May 1984. Afterwards Prince Vajiralongkorn, then the Crown Prince of Thailand, lived at the Sukhothai Palace until he moved to Amphorn Sathan Residential Hall.
