= Supreme Council of State of Siam =

Advisors to King Prajadhipok of Siam

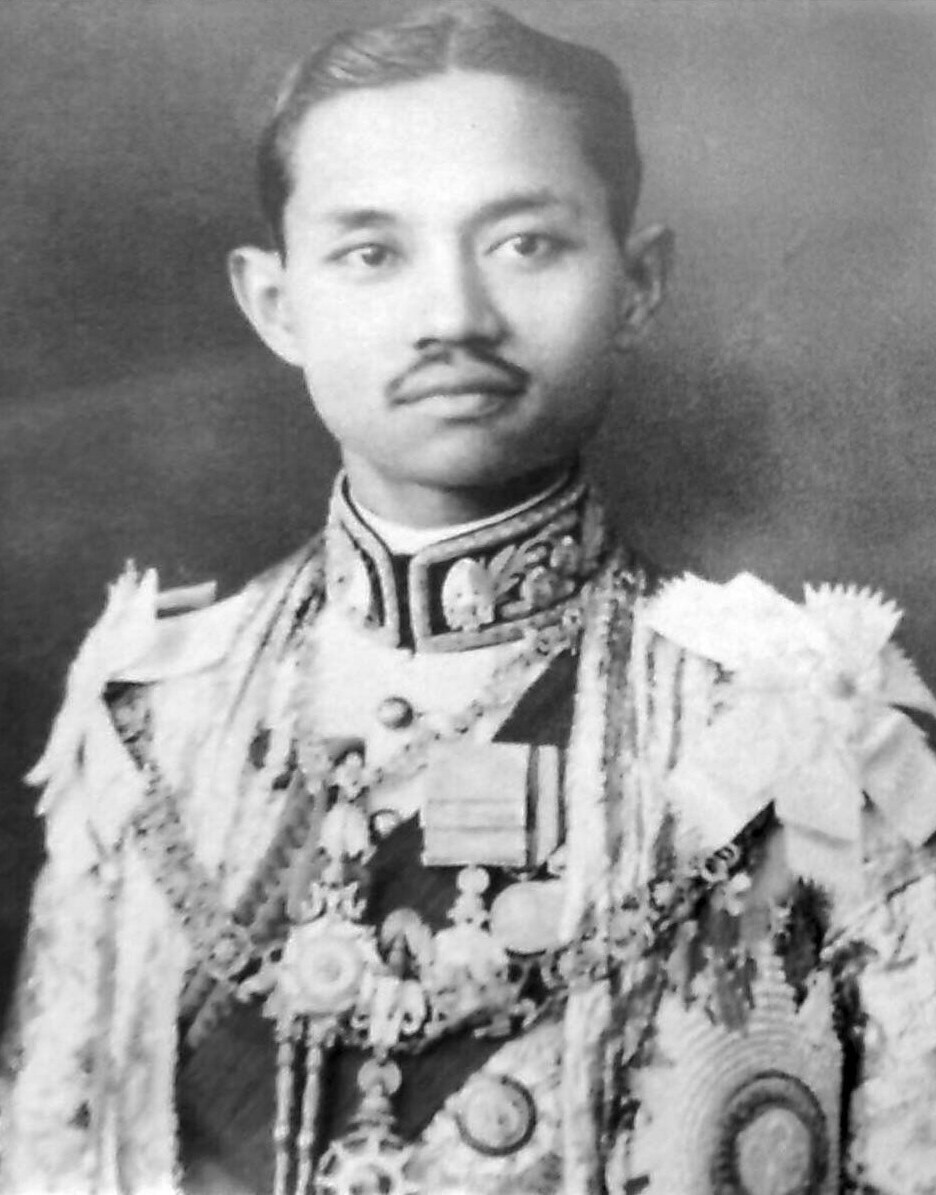
King Prajadhipok the seventh king of the Chakri dynasty. He came to the throne in 1925.

The Supreme Council of State of Siam (Thai: อภิรัฐมนตรีสภา) was an advisory and legislative council established by King Prajadhipok of Siam (Rama VII) that existed from 1925 to 1932. The Eton- and Sandhurst-educated monarch wished to create a council similar to a cabinet, where the most important government officials could meet to decide on state affairs. The council was founded on 28 November 1925 by royal command. Prajadhipok only succeeded to the throne three days earlier, after the death of his brother Vajiravudh on 25 November 1925.

== Members ==
The council was composed of five members, each a prince of the Chakri dynasty who had held ministerial positions during the reigns of King Rama V and Rama VI (Prajadhipok's father and older brother). The councillors were:

Portrait	Name	Note
	Prince Bhanurangsi Savangwongse, the Prince Banubandhu Vongsevoradej	President of the Supreme Council of State
	Prince Paribatra Sukhumbandhu, the Prince of Nakorn Sawan	Member
	Prince Chitcharoen, the Prince Narisara Nuwattiwong	Member
	Prince Tisavarakumarn, the Prince Damrong Rajanubhab	Member
	Prince Kitiyakara Voralaksana, the Prince of Chanthaburi	Member

The council was not the only organ of government at the time. The king also had a Privy Council (Thai: สภากรรมการองคมนตรี) and a Council of Secretaries (Thai: เสนาบดีสภา). However, the Supreme Council was regarded as the most important. Prince Paribatra was the most dominant member of the Council of State, since he was then regent and Minister of the Interior.

== History ==
Prajadhipok was the youngest son of King Chulalongkorn, the youngest prince of his generation. Senior princes (Prajadhipok's uncles and older brothers) had dominated the running of the government since the end of the 19th century, and were unwilling to lessen their grip on their power. Prajashipok acquiesced to most of their demands and were willing to pass off many responsibilities to the council. The appointment of Prince Damrong Rajanubhab to the council also signalled his return to government, after his removal by Vajiravudh from all of his offices in 1915.

During its existence the council took many initiatives. For example, in 1929 the council decided to cut public spending on the government including civil servant's pay and defence spending, an action which was one of the main justifications the Khana Ratsadon (the People's Party) gave for the Revolution of 1932.

The council filled many civil service and military positions with their own relatives from the dynasty, replacing many commoners appointed under King Vajiravudh (Rama VI), which also created discontent in the country. The council increased taxes on the populace to try to stem the economic downturn the country faced after the British Empire, Siam's largest trading partner, abandoned the gold standard.

The most important action by the council was the rejection of King Prajadhipok's draft Constitution for the Kingdom of Siam in early 1932, on the 150th anniversary of the House of Chakri and the foundation of Bangkok. The constitution would have given the people their first parliament, with a popularly elected lower house and an expanded Supreme Council as an upper house. A few months later the Khana Ratsadon staged a coup which ended the absolutist monarchy and replaced it with a constitutional monarchy. The constitution in which they promulgated abrogated the many powers of the monarch and dissolved the Supreme Council; it exiled the influential Prince Paripatra Sukhumband for life.

== See also ==
- Prajadhipok
- Bhanurangsi Savangwongse
- Narisara Nuvadtivongs
- Damrong Rajanubhab
- Kitiyakara Voralaksana
- Siamese Revolution of 1932
- Privy Council of Thailand
