= Sukhumala Marasri =

Queen of Siam (1861–1927)

Sukhumala Marasri; สุขุมาลมารศรี
- Queen Aunt of Siam
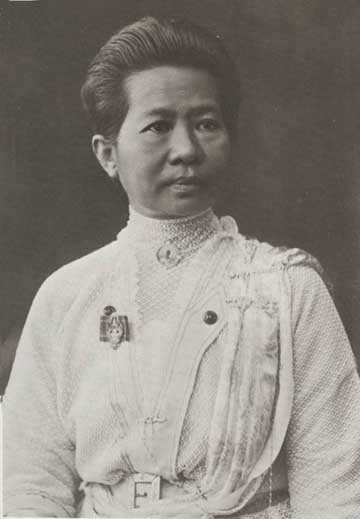

Princess consort of Siam
- Tenure: 30 June 1881 – 23 October 1910
- Born: 10 May 1861; Bangkok, Siam
- Died: 9 July 1927 (aged 66); Bangkok, Siam
- Spouse: Chulalongkorn (Rama V)
- Issue: Suddha Dibyaratana; Paribatra Sukhumbandhu
Names
- Phra Chao Luk Thoe Phra Ong Chao Sukhumala Marasri
Posthumous name
- Somdet Phra Pitucha Chao Sukhumala Marasri Phra Akkara Rajadevi
- Dynasty: Chakri
- Father: Mongkut (Rama IV)
- Mother: Samli Bunnag

Royal wives of Chulalongkorn

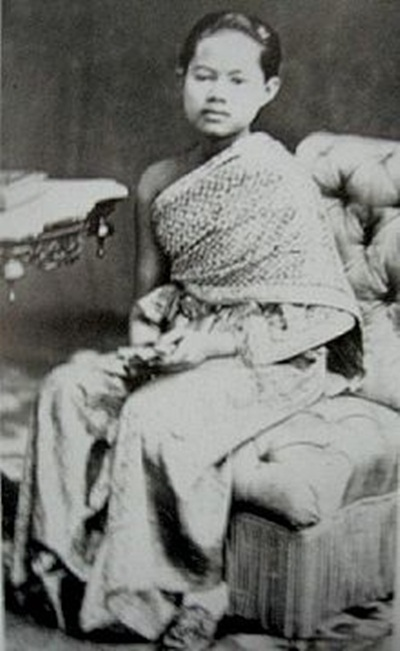
Sunanda Kumariratana

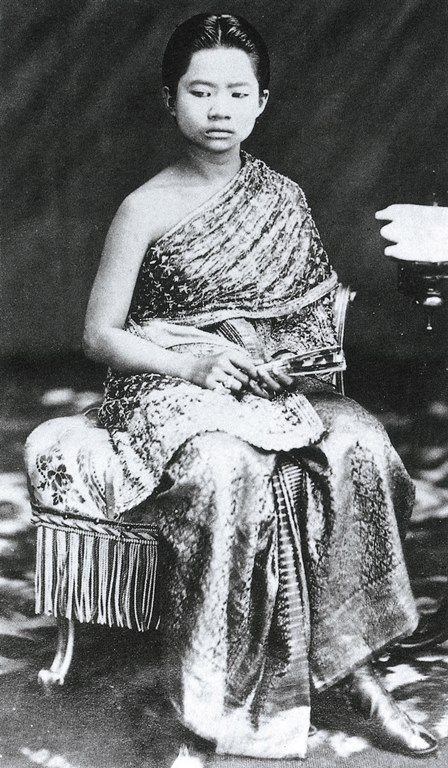
Sukhumala Marasri

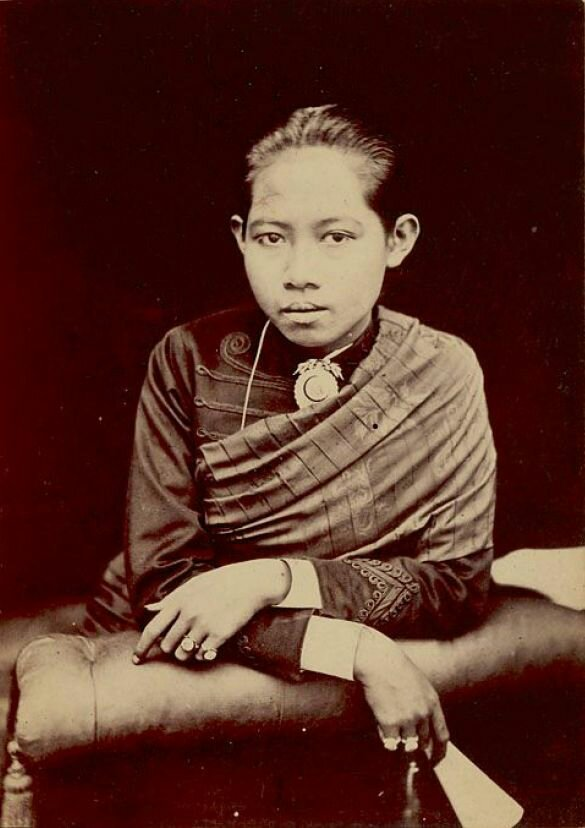
Savang Vadhana

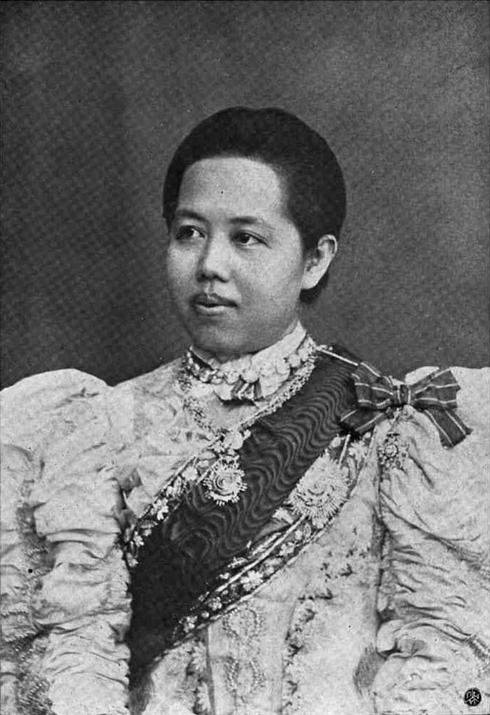
Saovabha Phongsri

Sukhumala Marasri (Thai: สุขุมาลมารศรี, RTGS: Sukhumanmarasi, Sukhumālmāraśrī; 10 May 1861 – 9 July 1927) was a daughter of King Mongkut (Rama IV) and his concubine, Samli (เจ้าคุณจอมมารดาสำลี). Her given name was Her Royal Highness Princess Sukhumala Marasri (พระเจ้าลูกเธอ พระองค์เจ้าสุขุมาลมารศรี). She later became the consort of her half-brother, King Chulalongkorn (Rama V). During the reign of King Prajadhipok (Rama VII), she was given the title Her Majesty Queen Sukhumala Marasri The Queen Aunt.

== Early life ==
Sukumala was born in the Royal Grand Palace on 10 May 1861. She was the 52nd child of King Mongkut. Her mother was a consort named Samli. She had 5 full siblings, including the famous Princess Napaborn, and from her father's side, she was a half-sister to King Chulalongkorn (later her husband), Queens Sunanda Kumariratana, Savang Vadhana, and Saovabha Phongsri.

When she was ten years old, King Mongkut died and was succeeded by Sukhumala Marasri's half-brother, Prince Chulalongkorn.

== Life as queen ==
Sometime in her teenage years, Sukhumala became a royal wife to King Chulalongkorn. The marriage produced two children; Princess Suddha Dibyaratana (later the Princess of Ratanakosin), who was also the first surviving Chao-Fah, a child of the sovereign which their mother is the Queen Consort or a Princess by blood, and Prince Paribatra Sukhumbandhu (later the Prince of Nakorn Sawan.) During her husband's reign, she served as the King's secretary and was referred to as "the Princess Consort".

After her husband died, she moved to her son's palace, Bang Khun Phrom. During the reign of King Vajiravudh, her nephew, he officially named her as his father's fourth queen consort, making her official title Her Majesty Queen Sukhumala. When Prajadhipok succeeded to the throne, he gave his father's two surviving queens consort, Savang Vadhana and Sukhumala, the title of "the Queen Aunt". In the same style, Sukhumala was preceded by Savang Vadhana, reflecting the fact that Savang Vadhana was created queen consort by Chulalongkorn before Sukhumala.

Queen Consort Sukhumala Marasri died on 9 July 1927 at the age of 66 at the Bang Khun Phrom Palace (H.R.H. Prince Paribatra Sukhumbandhu Palace). Her only surviving child, Prince Paribatra Sukhumbandhu, and her younger full sister, Princess Napaborn, were at her bedside.

== Aftermath ==
In her memory, one district was named "Rajdevi" after Sukumala.

When Prahadhipok abdicated and was succeeded by his nephew, Ananda Mahidol 1935, Sukumala was no longer aunt to the new king, thus she was simply referred to as Her Majesty Queen Sukumala Marasri. Unlike her younger-half sister, Savang Vadhana, who was created "the Queen Grandmother".

Her son, Prince Paribatra Sukhumbandhu was a prominent figure in Siamese politics during the later part of the absolute monarchy, often credited as the man behind King Prajadhipok's throne. The prince served as Minister of the Interior at the time of the Siamese revolution of 1932, and he was captured by the Khana Ratsadon (the People's Party) and placed under arrest. Prajadhipok accepted the demands of the rebels and became a constitutional monarch. Prince Paribatra, however was exiled from Siam. He eventually settled and died in Indonesia, having never returned to his homeland. Mom Rajawongse Sukhumbhand Paribatra, politician and Governor of Bangkok is one of his grandchildren.

Sukumala's younger sister, Princess Napaborn died at the age of 94.

== See also ==
- Chulalongkorn
- Sukhumbhand Paribatra
