= Paribatra Sukhumbandhu =

Thai military officer and government minister

- Prince of Nakhon Sawan
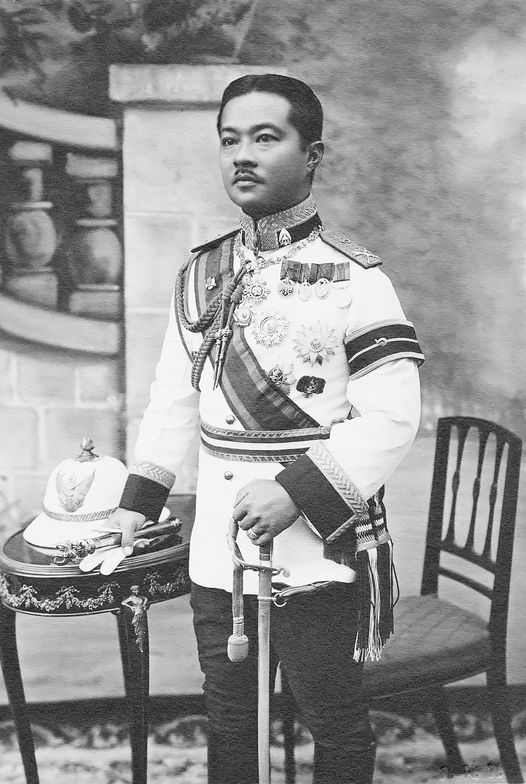
- Prince Paribatra, c. 1920s

Chief of Navy Department
- In office 24 February 1903 – 10 December 1910
- Preceded by: Bhanurangsi Savangwongse
- Succeeded by: Himself as Minister

Minister of Navy
- In office 11 December 1910 – 18 June 1920
- Preceded by: Himself as Commander
- Succeeded by: Bhanurangsi Savangwongse (as Director-General)

Minister of Defence
- In office 24 August 1926 – 31 March 1928
- Preceded by: Yaem na Nakhon
- Succeeded by: Boworadet Kridakorn

Minister of Interior
- In office 1 April 1928 – 24 June 1932
- Preceded by: Yugala Dighambara
- Succeeded by: Chit Sunthornvon
- Born: 29 June 1881; Bangkok, Siam
- Died: 18 January 1944 (aged 62); Bandung, Japanese-occupied Dutch East Indies
- Spouse: Prasongsom Jayanta; Sombandh Palakawong
- Issue: 10 sons and daughters, including: Chumbhotbongs Paribatra, Prince of Nakhon Sawan II; Prince Sukhumabhinanda
- House: Paribatra (Chakri dynasty)
- Father: Chulalongkorn (Rama V)
- Mother: Sukhumala Marasri
- Military career
- Allegiance: Kingdom of Siam
- Branch: Royal Siamese Army; Royal Siamese Navy
- Rank: Field Marshal; Admiral of the Fleet

Marshal-Admiral Paribatra Sukhumbandhu, Prince of Nakhon Sawan (Note: RTGS: Boriphat Sukhumphan; Thai: สมเด็จพระเจ้าบรมวงศ์เธอ เจ้าฟ้าบริพัตรสุขุมพันธุ์ กรมพระนครสวรรค์วรพินิต) (29 June 1881 – 18 January 1944), was a highly influential Thai military officer and government minister in the early 20th century during the last years of the absolute monarchy. He served as Chief of Staff of the Royal Thai Army, Commander of the Royal Thai Navy, Naval Minister, Army Minister, Defense Minister, Interior Minister, and as a Privy Counsellor to both King Vajiravudh and King Prajadhipok.

== Biography ==
Prince Paribatra was the 33rd child (and 13th son) of King Chulalongkorn (Rama V) by Queen Sukhumala Marasri. He joined his father for a journey to Europe in 1897, following which he entered the Prussian Cadet Corps to study at the Prussian Military academy at Groß-Lichterfelde.

Following his return to Siam, his half brother King Vajiravudh (Rama VI) appointed him Commander of the Royal Thai Navy, Minister of Marine and Minister of the Army. During the reign of King Prajadhipok (Rama VII), he was appointed Minister of Interior and was made member of the Supreme Council of the State of Siam, responsible for state affairs.

Prince Paribatra's considerable influence in the Siamese government was deemed as a threat by the Khana Ratsadon which organized the 1932 coup that ended the absolute monarchy in Siam. As a consequence, he was exiled from the kingdom to Bandung, Dutch East Indies, which was then under the Dutch administration. He died in 1944 while in exile, in Japanese-controlled Indonesia. His remains were repatriated by a Royal commission (a member of which was Prince Arjuna Suasti) in 1948.

A half-brother to two Thai kings, Prince Paribatra fathered eight children by his royal wife, Mom Chao (HSH Princess) Prasongsom Paribatra (Chaiyan). Two were sons, but only one, Chumbhotbongs Paribatra, lived to adulthood. Prince Paribatra also had a son with a commoner wife, Mom Somphan Paribatra na Ayudhaya (Palakawong), Prince Sukhumabhinanda - father of Mom Ratchawong Sukhumbhand Paribatra, the former governor of Bangkok.

Paribatra's principal Bangkok residence until his forced exile in 1932 was the neo-baroque styled Bang Khun Prom Palace, constructed by architects Mario Tamagno and Karl Döhring. It later became the headquarters and subsequently museum of the Bank of Thailand.

== Siamese Revolution ==
In June 1932, while King Rama VII was residing in the coastal town of Hua Hin, Paribatra, as President of the Supreme Council of State and Minister of the Interior, was the highest-ranking authority in Bangkok. On June 23, Paribatra received a report from the Director-General of the Police Department listing individuals suspected of plotting a rebellion and requesting authorization to arrest them. Paribatra was skeptical of the report, as he considered that the military officers named in it did not hold positions commanding combat units and therefore were unlikely to possess sufficient capacity to launch a successful coup. Moreover, many of those on the list were individuals whom he knew personally and had previously supported. Consequently, he declined to authorize the arrests, intending instead to conduct a full investigation to establish the facts.

In the early hours of 24 June, the revolutionary faction of about 50 men entered Bang Khun Phrom Palace without resistance. Paribatra was subsequently taken into custody and brought to the Ananta Samakhom Throne Hall while still wearing his pajamas, together with other senior members of the royal family. At first, Paribatra believed that the leader of the revolutionary was Prince Boworadet, a former Minister of Defence. He later learned that the actual leader was Phraya Phahon Phonphayuhasena. On the following day, Paribatra was compelled to go into exile abroad, while Bang Khun Phrom Palace was confiscated as state property.

== Honours ==
National honours

- Knight of the Order of the Royal House of Chakri
- Knight of the Order of the Nine Gems
- Knight Grand Cordon of the Order of Chula Chom Klao
- Knight of the Ratana Varabhorn Order of Merit
- Knight Grand Commander of the Order of Rama
- Knight Grand Cordon of the Order of the White Elephant
- Knight Grand Cordon of the Order of the Crown of Thailand
- Dushdi Mala Medal Pin of Services to the Monarch (Military)
- Dushdi Mala Medal Pin of Arts and Science (Military)
- Chakra Mala Medal
- Saradul Mala Medal
- King Rama IV Royal Cypher Medal, 2nd Class
- King Rama V Royal Cypher Medal, 1st Class
- King Rama VI Royal Cypher Medal, 1st Class
- King Rama VII Royal Cypher Medal, 1st Class

Foreign Honours

- Knight of the Order of the Rue Crown
- Knight of the Order of the Elephant
- Collar of the Order of Charles III
- Grand Cross of the Order of the Dannebrog
- Grand Cross of the Order of St. Olav
- Grand Cross of the Legion of Honour
- Grand Cordon of the Order of the Rising Sun
- Grand Cross of the Order of Leopold
- Grand Cross of the Order of Henry the Lion
- Order of the Red Eagle, 1st class
- Knight Grand Cross of the Order of Saints Maurice and Lazarus
- Knight Grand Cross of the House Order of Fidelity
- Croix de Guerre

== See also ==
- Siamese coup d'état of 1932
- Supreme Council of State of Siam

== Notes ==
Paribatra Sukhumbandhu, Prince of Nakhon Sawan House of Paribatra Cadet branch of the House of Chakri Born: 29 June 1881 Died: 18 January 1944
Political offices
Vacant Title last held by Bodindechanuchit	Minister of Defence; 1926–1928	Succeeded by Boworadet
Preceded by Yugala Dighambara	Minister of Interior; 1928–1932	Vacant Title next held by Jaseanyabodi Sriboridan
Assembly seats
Preceded by Bhanubandhu Vongsevoradej	President of the Supreme Council of State; 1928–1932	Dissolved the Council
Military offices
Preceded by Bhanubandhu Vongsevoradej	Chief of Navy Department; 1903–1910	Succeeded by Himself as Minister of Navy
Preceded by Himself as Chief of Navy Department	Minister of Navy; 1910–1920	Vacant Title next held by Abhakara Kiartivongse
Vacant Title last held by Bodindechanuchit	Minister of War; 1926–1928	Succeeded by Boworadet
Non-profit organization positions
Vacant Title last held by Chakrabongse Bhuvanath	Vice President of the Siamese Red Cross Society; 1920–1932	Succeeded by Chaophraya Phichaiyat
