= Prajadhipok =

King of Siam from 1925 to 1935

Prajadhipok; ประชาธิปก
- King Rama VII
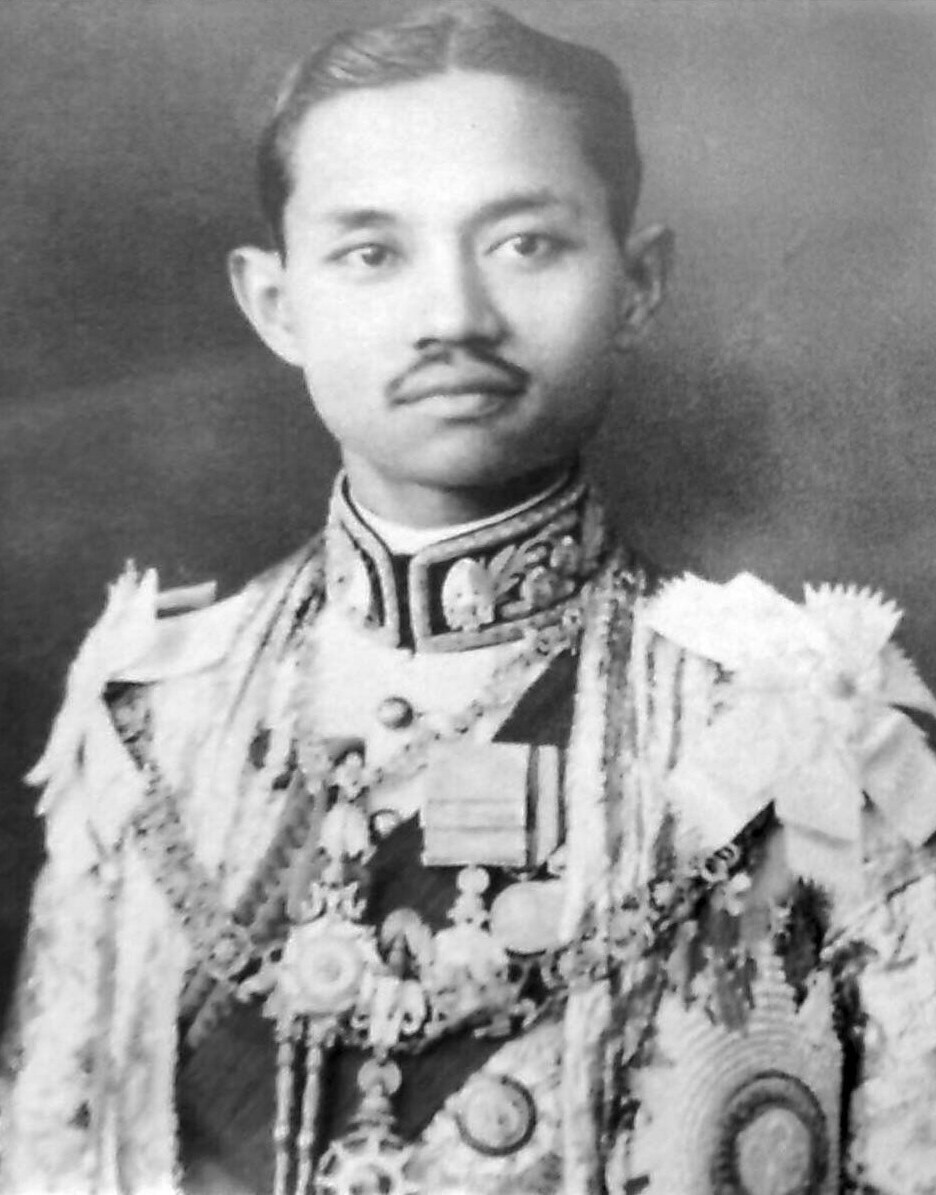
- Formal portrait, c. 1930s

King of Siam
- Reign: 26 November 1925 – 2 March 1935
- Coronation: 25 February 1926
- Predecessor: Vajiravudh (Rama VI)
- Successor: Ananda Mahidol (Rama VIII)
- Regent: Paribatra Sukhumbandhu (1932); Chitcharoen (1934–1935)

Regent of Siam
- Regency: 1925 – 26 November 1925
- Monarch: Vajiravudh (Rama VI)
- Born: 8 November 1893; Bangkok, Siam
- Died: 30 May 1941 (aged 47); Surrey, England
- Burial: 3 June 1941; Golders Green Crematorium
- Spouse: Rambai Barni (m. 1918)
- Dynasty: Chakri
- Father: Chulalongkorn (Rama V)
- Mother: Saovabha Phongsri
- Religion: Theravada Buddhism
- Education: Eton College; Royal Military Academy, Woolwich
- Military career
- Allegiance: United Kingdom; Kingdom of Siam
- Branch: British Army; Royal Siamese Army
- Service years: 1913–1914
- Unit: Royal Horse Artillery

Prajadhipok, (Note: Thai: ประชาธิปก; RTGS: Prachathipok) also known as Rama VII (8 November 1893 – 30 May 1941) was the seventh monarch of the Chakri dynasty and the last king of Siam under the absolute monarchy. He ascended the throne in 1925 and reigned until his abdication in 1935 during his self-imposed exile following his fallout with the new democratic government after the 1932 Siamese Revolution, which brought an end to the country’s absolute monarchy.

Born during the reign of King Chulalongkorn, Prajadhipok was the youngest son of Chulalongkorn and Queen Saovabha Phongsri. He succeeded his brother, King Vajiravudh, and pursued significant reforms, including establishing the Privy Council, modernizing financial and public-utility regulations, advancing municipal administration, founding the National Library, expanding university education, establishing the Royal Institute, and commissioning the complete Thai-script edition of the Tripitaka. However, his rule was also marked by weak political leadership and turbulent economy due to the Great Depression, leading to the revolution in 1932. After a failed royalist reactionary revolt in 1933, he went into a self-imposed exile in Britain and later abdicated.

Following his abdication, Prajadhipok and Queen Rambai Barni settled in England and never returned to Siam. As he left no heirs, the cabinet and parliament invited his young nephew Prince Ananda Mahidol to become king at age nine, marking the rise of the Mahidol branch. After Ananda's death in 1946, his brother Bhumibol Adulyadej (Rama IX) succeeded him.

UNESCO has acknowledged the historical importance of documents and artifacts related to King Prajadhipok's reign. His personal collection of photographs and films documented Siam's transition. Additionally, "The Minute Books of the Council of State of Siam (1893–1932)", which include records from his time, are listed on the UNESCO Memory of the World Register. UNESCO has also recognized him as a "great personality" in commemorations.

== Early life ==
Young Prajadhipok in 1900.

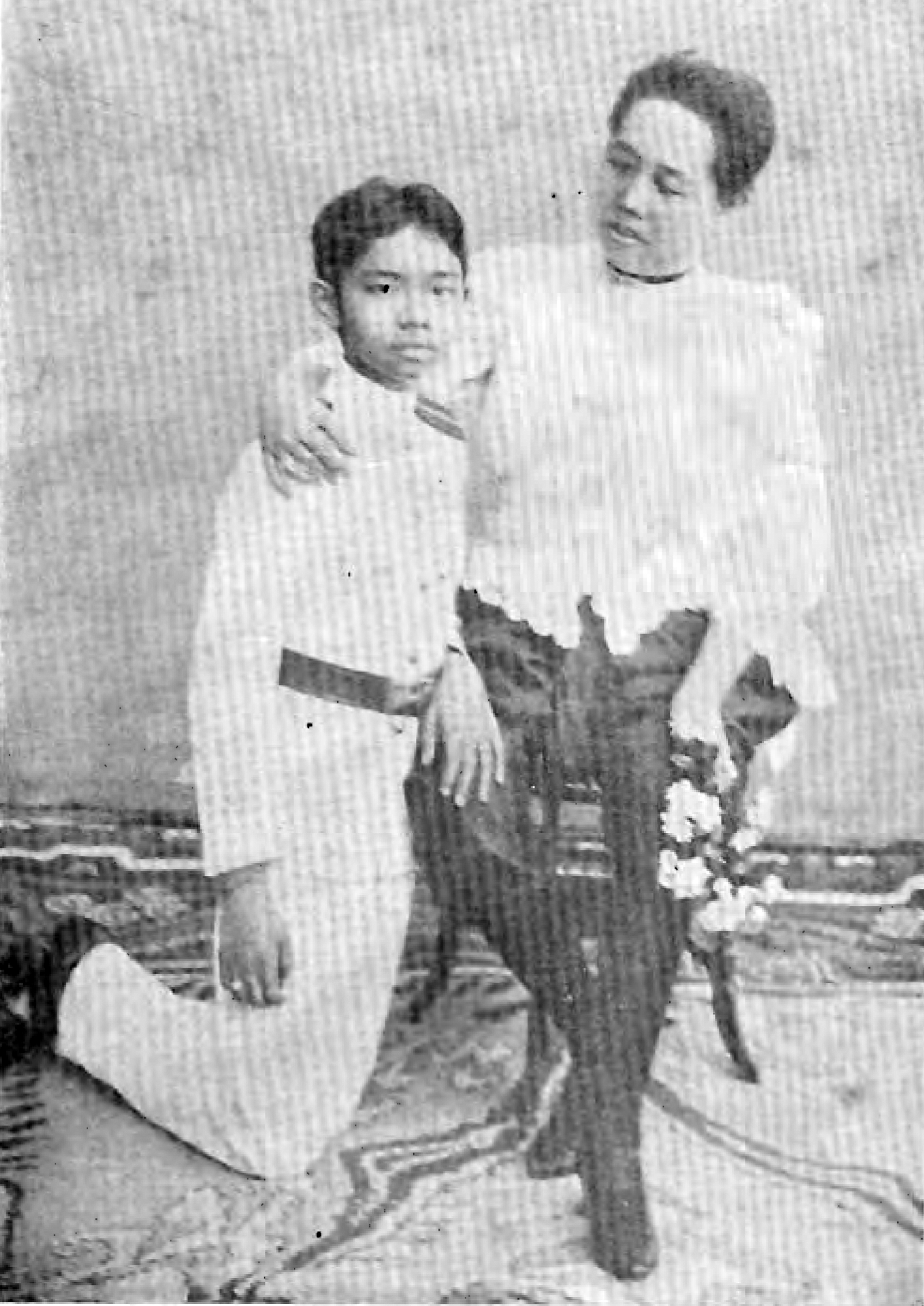
Young Prajadhipok and his mother, Saovabha Phongsri

Prajadhipok was born on 8 November 1893 in Bangkok, Siam (now Thailand) to King Chulalongkorn and Queen Saovabha Phongsri. Prince Prajadhipok was the youngest of nine children born to the couple. Overall he was the king's second-youngest child (of a total of 77), and the 33rd and youngest of Chulalongkorn's sons.

Unlikely to succeed to the throne, Prince Prajadhipok chose to pursue a military career. Like many of the king's children, he was sent abroad to study, going to Eton College in 1906, then to the Woolwich Military Academy from which he graduated in 1913. He received a commission in the Royal Horse Artillery in the British Army based in Aldershot. In 1910 Chulalongkorn died and was succeeded by Prajadhipok's older brother (also a son of Queen Saovabha), Crown Prince Vajiravudh, who became King Rama VI. Prince Prajadhipok was by then commissioned in both the British Army and the Royal Siamese Army. With the outbreak of the First World War and the declaration of Siamese neutrality, King Vajiravudh ordered his younger brother to resign his British commission and return to Siam immediately, a great embarrassment to the prince, who wanted to serve with his men on the Western front. Once home, Prajadhipok became a high-ranking military official in Siam. In 1917 he was ordained temporarily as a monk, as was customary for most Buddhist Siamese men.

In August 1918 Prince Prajadhipok married his childhood friend and cousin Rambai Barni, a descendant of King Mongkut (Prajadhipok's grandfather) and his Royal Consort Piam. They were married at Sukhothai Palace which was a wedding gift to the couple from Queen Saovabha.

After the war in Europe ended, he attended the École Superieure de Guerre in France, returning to Siam to the Siamese military. During this time, he was granted the additional title Krom Luang Sukhothai (Prince of Sukhothai). Prajadhipok lived a generally quiet life with his wife at their residence, Sukhothai Palace, next to the Chao Phraya River. The couple had no children. Prajadhipok soon found himself rising rapidly in succession to the throne, as his brothers all died within a relatively short period. In 1925, King Vajiravudh himself died at the age of 44. Prajadhipok became absolute monarch at only thirty-two. He was crowned King of Siam on 25 February 1926.

== Last absolute monarch ==
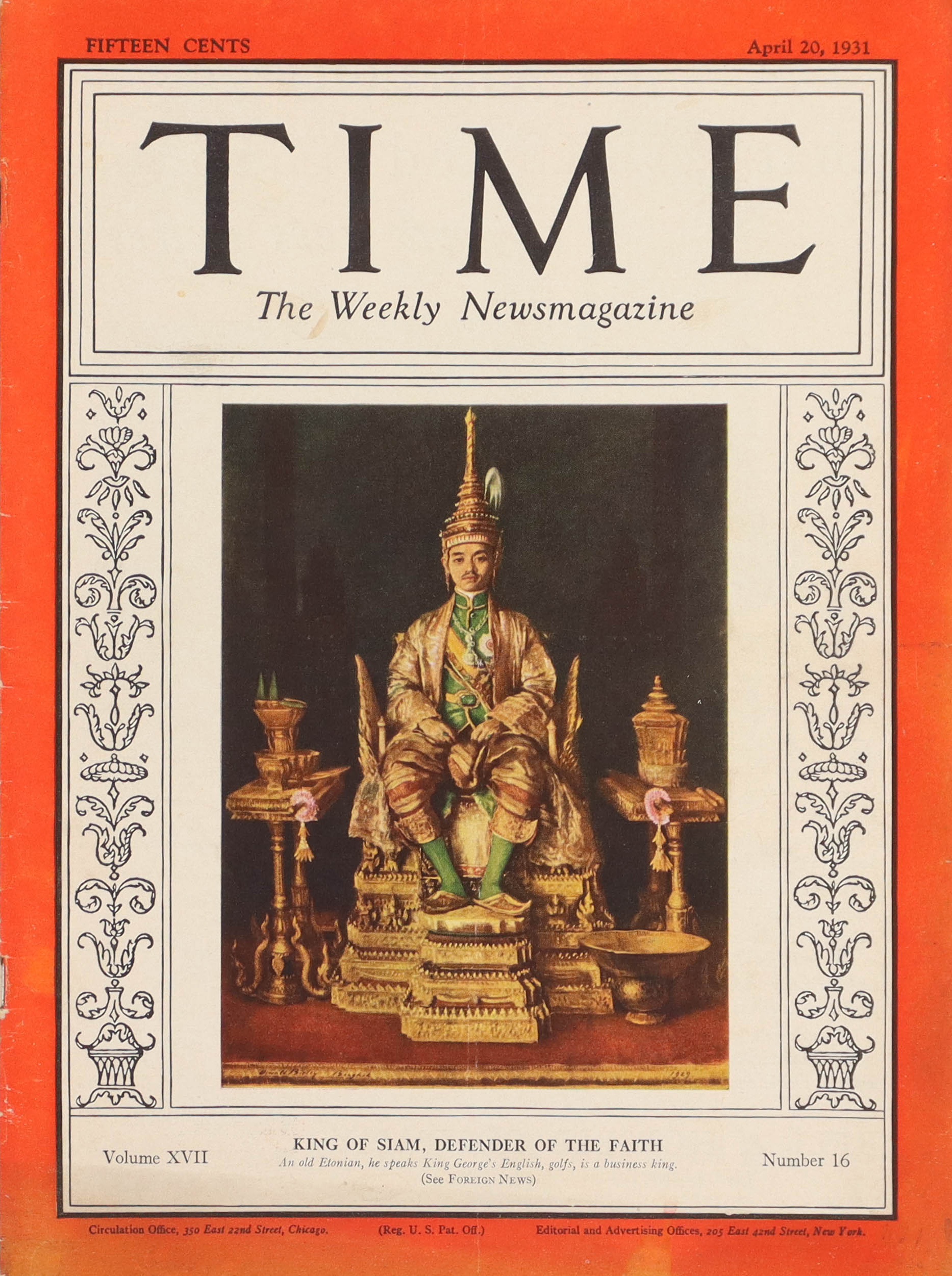
King Prajadhipok on TIME magazine cover in 1931

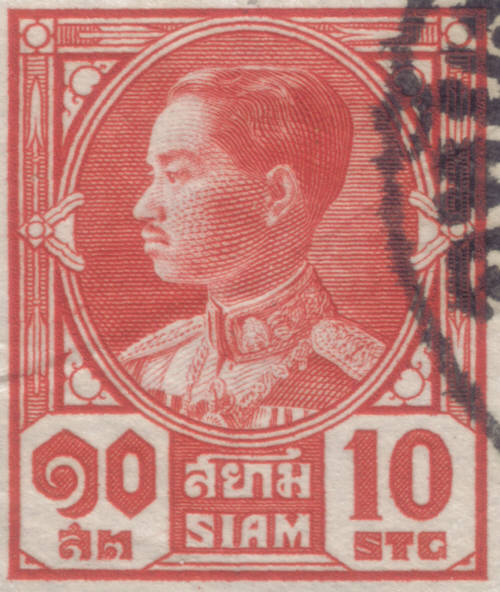
Thai stamp of Rama VII's reign

Relatively unprepared for his new responsibilities, Prajadhipok was nevertheless intelligent, diplomatic in his dealings with others, modest, and eager to learn. However, he had inherited serious political and economic problems from his predecessor. The budget was heavily in deficit, and the royal financial accounts were in serious disorder. The entire world was in the throes of the Great Depression.

In an institutional innovation intended to restore confidence in the monarchy and government, Prajadhipok, in what was virtually his first act as king, announced the creation of the Supreme Council of the State of Siam. This council was made up of five experienced members of the royal family, although to emphasise the break with the previous reign the selected five had all fallen out of favour with the previous monarch. The council thus comprised three of the king's uncles, Prince Bhanurangsi, Prince Naris and Prince Damrong Rajanubhab and two of his half-brothers, Prince Kitiyakon (Prince Chantaburi) and Prince Boriphat.

Many of the Princes of the Supreme Council felt that it was their duty to make amends for the mistakes of the previous reign, but their acts were not generally appreciated, for the government failed to communicate to the public the purpose of the policies they pursued to rectify Vajiravudh's extreme financial extravagances. Gradually these princes arrogated power to themselves, monopolising all the main ministerial positions and appointing their sons and brothers to both administrative and military posts. By April 1926 almost the entire cabinet of ministry heads had been replaced with newly appointed Princes or nobles, with only three former members being re-appointed. While the family appointments brought back men of talent and experience, they also signalled a return to royal oligarchy.

The king clearly wished to demonstrate a clear break with the discredited sixth reign, and his choice of men to fill the top positions appeared to be guided largely by a wish to restore a Chulalongkorn-type government. Unlike his predecessor, the king read virtually all state papers that came his way, from ministerial submissions to petitions by citizens. The king was painstaking and conscientious; he would elicit comments and suggestions from a range of experts and study them, noting the good points in each submission, but when various options were available he would seldom be able to select the best one and abandon others. He would often rely upon the Supreme Council to prod him in a particular direction.

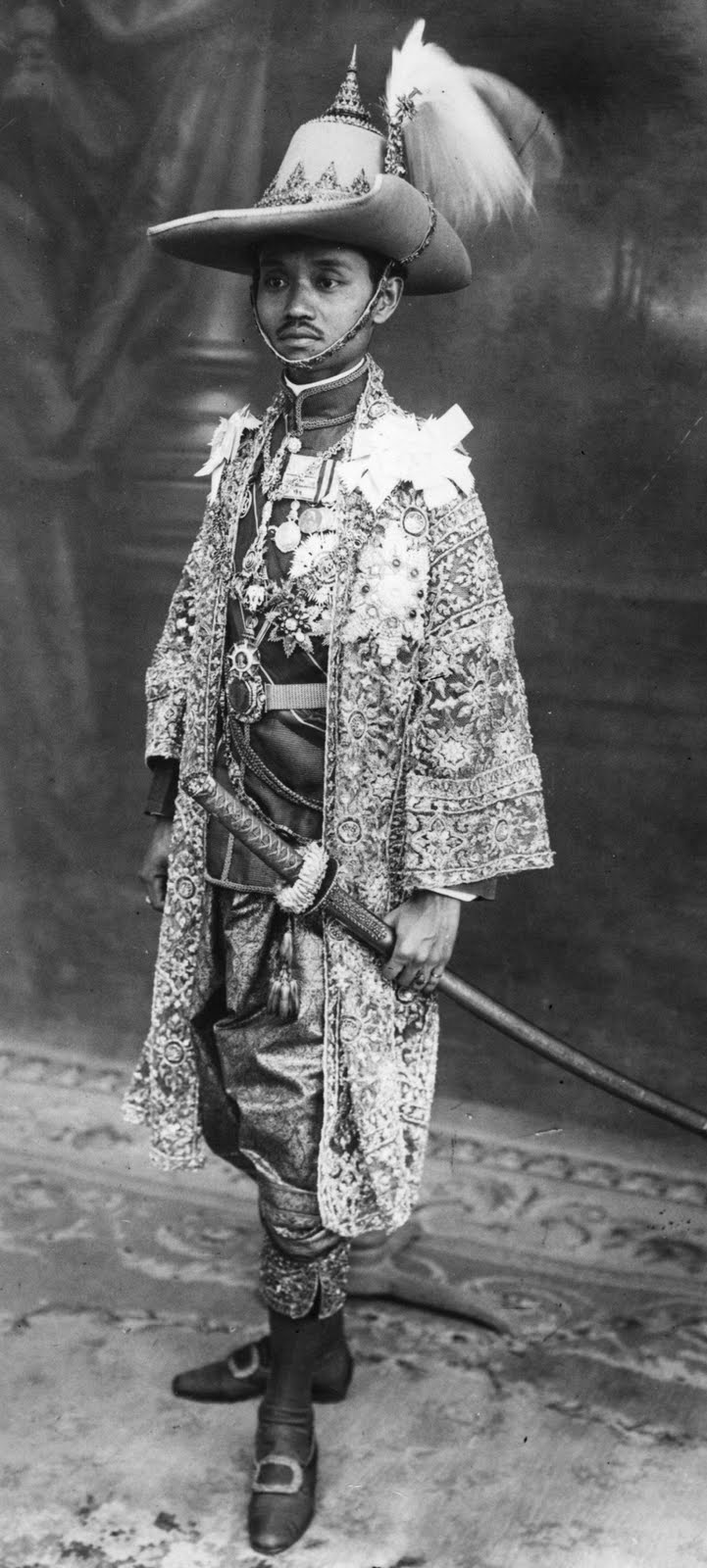
King Prajadhipok in Khrui, carrying Krabi sword.

From the beginning of his reign King Prajadhipok was acutely aware that political change was necessary if the monarchy was to be preserved. He viewed his newly established Supreme Council as an institutional check upon the powers of an absolute monarch. During 1926, Prajadhipok experimented with using the Privy Council, which had over 200 members at that time, as a quasi-legislative body. This large of an assembly proved too cumbersome, and in 1927 Prajadhipok created the Committee of the Privy Council consisting of 40 members selected from the royal family or nobility. The committee was received positively by the press and was envisaged as a forerunner of a parliament or National Assembly. In practice however the committee remained relatively unimportant and did not develop into a more powerful or representative body.

In 1926 Prajadhipok wrote a lengthy memorandum to his American adviser Francis B. Sayre titled "Problems of Siam" in which he set forth nine questions he felt were the most serious facing the nation. The third question asked whether Siam should have a parliamentary system, which Prajadhipok doubted. The fourth question asked whether Siam was ready for representative government, to which Prajadhipok answered "my personal opinion is an emphatic NO". However, the king did see a possibility to introduce reform at the local level as the "next step in our educational move towards democracy". In 1926 he began moves to develop the concept of prachaphiban, or "municipality", which had emerged late in the fifth reign as a law regarding public health and sanitation. Information was obtained regarding local self-government in surrounding countries, and proposals to allow certain municipalities to raise local taxes and manage their own budgets were drawn up. The fact that the public was not sufficiently educated to make the scheme work militated against the success of this administrative venture. Nevertheless, the idea of teaching the Siamese the concept of democracy through a measure of decentralisation of power in municipalities had become, in Prajadhipok's mind, fundamental to future policy-making. However, Yasukichi Yatabe, Japanese minister to Siam, criticized the king's way and that it would not be accomplished in a hundred years' time.

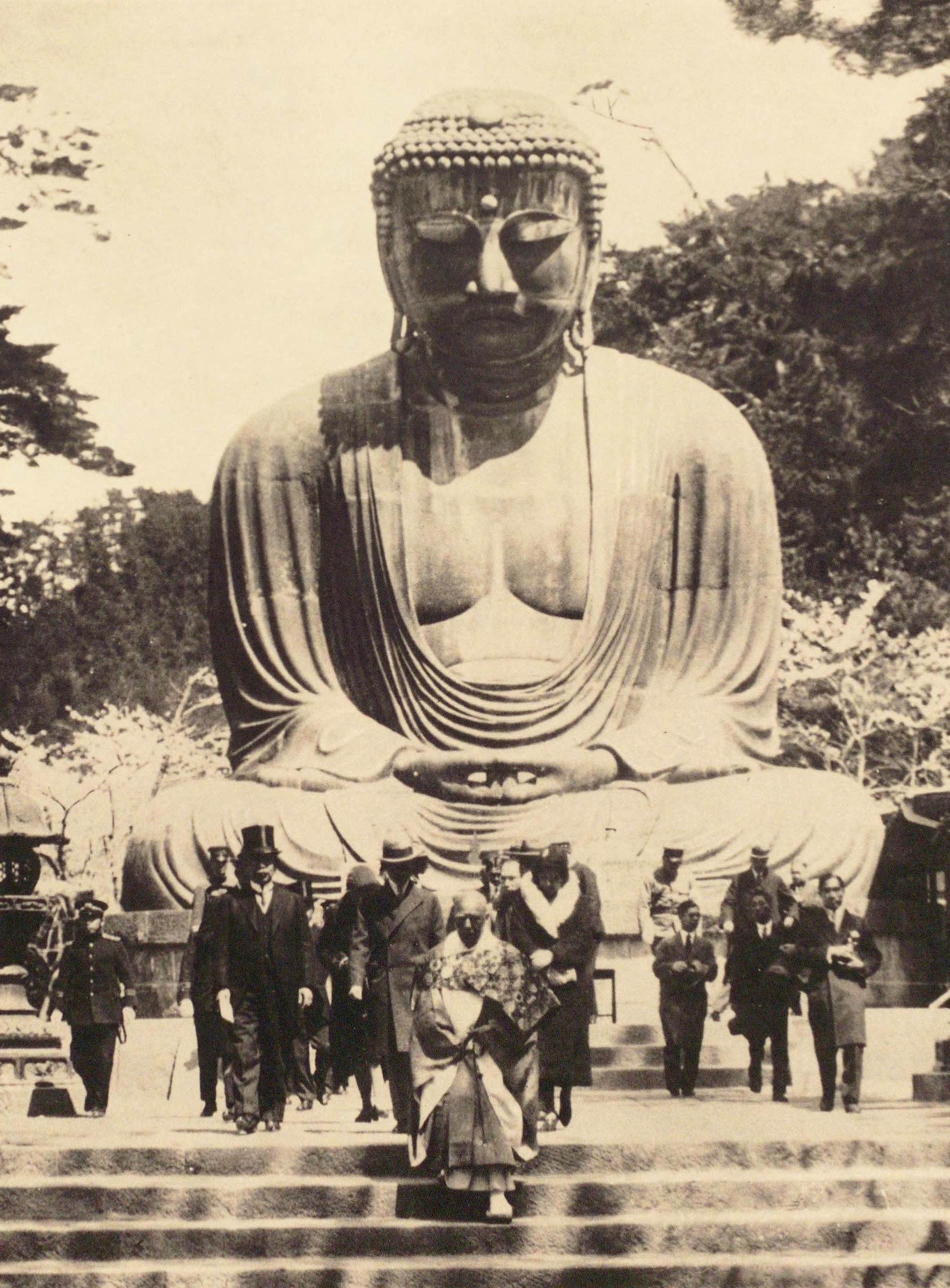
State visit of Rama VII to Japan, at Kōtoku-in, 1931

In September 1931 Britain abandoned the gold standard and devalued sterling by 30 percent. This created a crisis for Siam since most of its foreign exchange was held in sterling. The Minister of Finance kept Siam on the gold standard by linking the currency to the US dollar, but debate about this policy raged within the government into 1932. One impact of this policy was that Siam's rice exports became more expensive than competitor exporters, negatively impacting revenue.

In mid-October 1931 the king returned from a trip to Canada and the US and ordered Prince Devawongse Varoprakar, the Minister of Foreign Affairs to prepare a constitution. The task of drafting this document was given to the American Raymond B. Stevens and Phaya Sri Wisarn Waja. In March the following year they submitted an "Outline of Changes in the Form of Government" together with their comments. Prajadhipok originally planned to announce the new constitution to the nation of 6 April at the opening of the Memorial Bridge to commemorate the 150th anniversary of the Chakri dynasty. These proposals met strong opposition from Prince Damrong and other royal members of the Supreme Council and despite his own misgivings that to not proceed would result in a coup against his government, the king ultimately did not make the planned announcement.

On 20 January 1932, with the country deep in depression, the king convened a "round table" meeting to discuss the many competing arguments and to agree on how to tackle the crisis. From this meeting it was agreed to make large cuts in government spending and implement a retrenchment programme. Two weeks later on 5 February the king addressed a group of military officers and spoke at length about the economic situation. In this speech he remarked "I myself know nothing at all about managing finances, and all I can do is listen to the opinions of others and choose the best...If I have made a mistake, I believe I really deserve to be excused by the people of Siam". No previous monarch had ever spoken so honestly. The speech was widely reported and many interpreted his words not as a frank appeal for understanding and cooperation, but as a sign of weakness and proof that the system of rule of fallible autocrats should be abolished.

== Revolution of 1932 ==
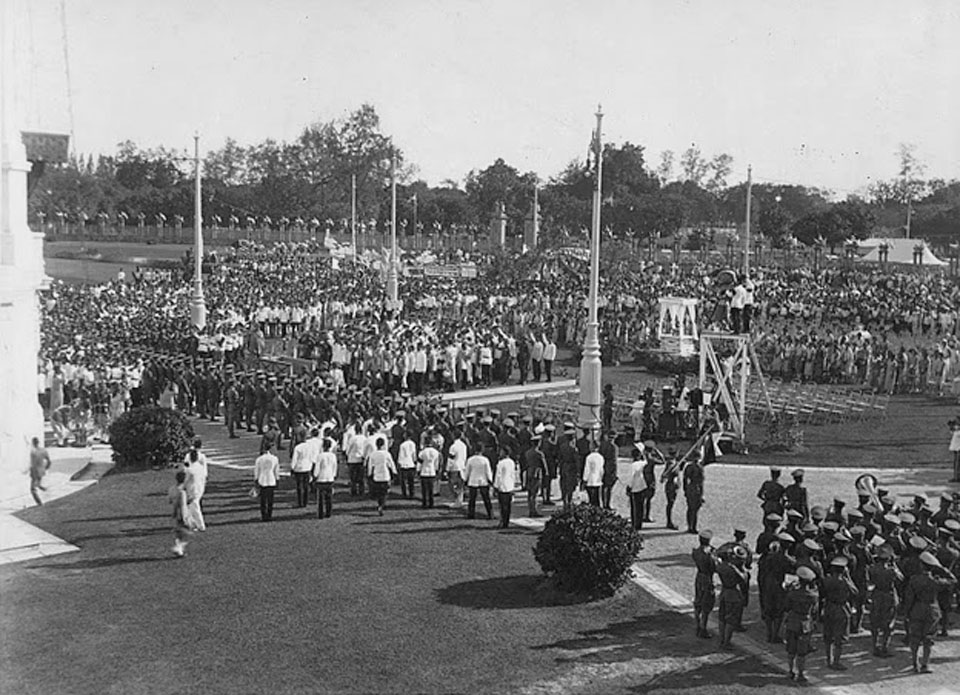
A Khana Ratsadon meeting in Ananta Samakhom

A small group of soldiers and civil servants began secretly plotting to overthrow absolute monarchy and bring a constitutional government to the kingdom. Their efforts culminated in an almost bloodless "revolution" on the morning of 24 June 1932 by the self-proclaimed Khana Ratsadon (People's Party; คณะราษฎร). While Prajadhipok was away at Klai Kangwon Palace in Hua Hin, the plotters took control of the Ananda Samakhom Throne Hall in Bangkok and arrested key officials (mainly princes and relatives of the king). The People's Party demanded Prajadhipok become a constitutional monarch and grant Thai people a constitution. In the event of a negative response, they reserved the right to declare Siam a republic. The king immediately accepted the People's Party's request and the first "permanent" constitution of Siam was promulgated on 10 December.

Prajadhipok returned to Bangkok on 26 June and received the coup plotters in a royal audience. As they entered the room, Prajadhipok greeted them, saying "I rise in honour of the Khana Ratsadon." It was a significant gesture because, according to previous royal rituals, monarchs were to remain seated while their subjects made obeisance, this showed that Prajadhipok was acknowledging the changed circumstances.

== First constitutional monarch ==
Monarchs of the Chakri dynasty
- Phutthayotfa Chulalok (Rama I)
- Phutthaloetla Naphalai (Rama II)
- Nangklao (Rama III)
- Mongkut (Rama IV)
- Chulalongkorn (Rama V)
- Vajiravudh (Rama VI)
- Prajadhipok (Rama VII)
- Ananda Mahidol (Rama VIII)
- Bhumibol Adulyadej (Rama IX)
- Vajiralongkorn (Rama X)

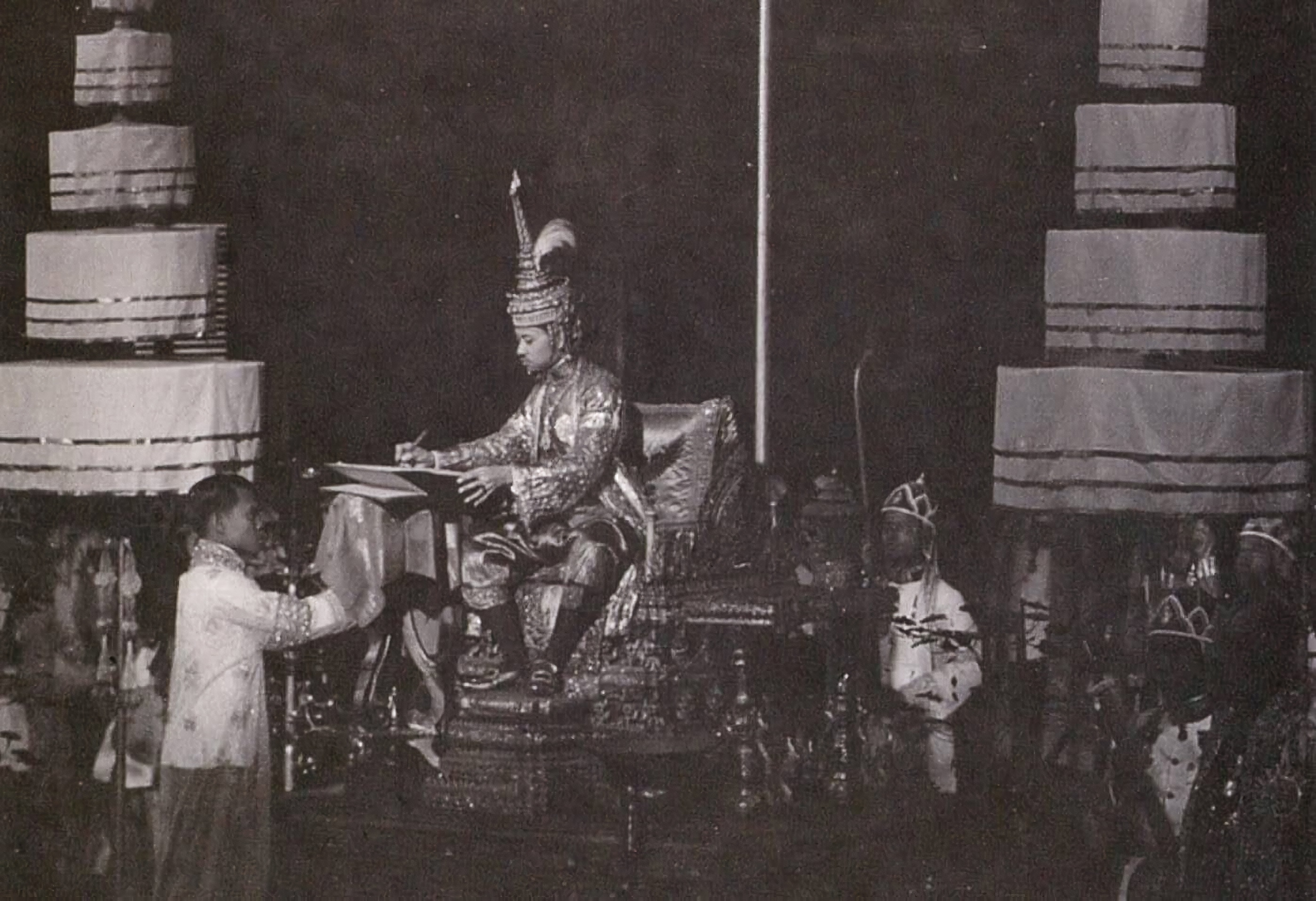
King Prajadhipok signs The Constitution of the Siam Kingdom on 10 December 1932.

In the early stages of the constitutional monarchy, the King and the royalists seemed to be able to compromise with Khana Ratsadon. The constitutional bill which was drafted by Pridi Banomyong and intended to be a permanent one was made temporary. The new constitution restored some of the monarch's lost power and status. Among them were introduction of unelected half of the House of Representatives and royal veto power. The country's first prime minister Phraya Manopakorn Nitithada was a conservative and royalist nobleman.

The compromise broke down quickly. He did not contest when his interpretation of Pridi's economic plan, which also aim on land reform and seizure of royal land, was released with his signature. The king played a role in the coup d'état of April 1933, where the House was ordered to close by the prime minister. He signed an order to execute Khana Ratsadon leaders. But Khana Ratsadon's military wing leader Phraya Phahonphonphayuhasena ousted the government and restored its power.

He played an active role in an anti-revolutionary network, which also aimed to assassinate Khana Ratsadon's leaders.

In October 1933, the maverick Prince Boworadej, a former minister of defence, led an armed revolt against the government. In the Boworadet Rebellion, he mobilised several provincial garrisons and marched on Bangkok, occupying the Don Muang aerodrome. Prince Boworadej accused the government of being disrespectful to the monarch and of promoting communism, and demanded that government leaders resign. However, the rebellion ultimately failed.

The king did not directly support the rebellion, but there was a cheque from the treasury to Boworadej. The insurrection diminished the king's prestige. When the revolt began, Prajadhipok immediately informed the government that he regretted the strife and civil disturbances. The royal couple then took refuge at Songkhla, in the far south. The king's withdrawal from the scene was interpreted by the Khana Ratsadorn as a failure to do his duty. By not throwing his full support behind government forces, he had undermined their trust in him.

In 1934 the Assembly voted to amend civil and military penal codes. The king vetoed the changes to the separation between personal and royal assets as he did not want to pay tax, and protested an amendment to diminish the king's consideration of death sentence over the courts. After many losses to Khana Ratsadon, the king seemed to change his stance and expressed support for democracy and blamed Khana Ratsadon for being anti-democratic. However, Phibul later discussed in the House that unelected parliamentary members were the king's wish, and another House member criticized the king for being unbearable.

Prajadhipok, whose relations with the Khana Ratsadon had been deteriorating for some time, went on a tour of Europe before visiting England for medical treatment. He continued to correspond with the government regarding the conditions under which he would continue to serve. He tried to retain some of the royal powers, such as power to veto law with no possible override. Other disagreements were on royal assets and royal benefits. After the government did not comply, on 14 October Prajadhipok announced his intention to abdicate unless his requests were met.

=== Trip to Europe ===
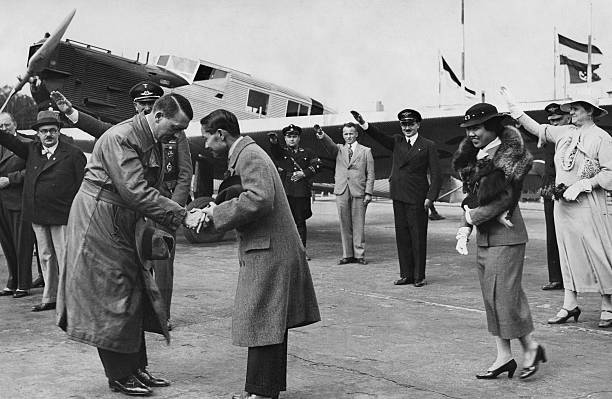
King Prajadhipok and Adolf Hitler at Berlin Tempelhof Airport in Nazi Germany, 1934

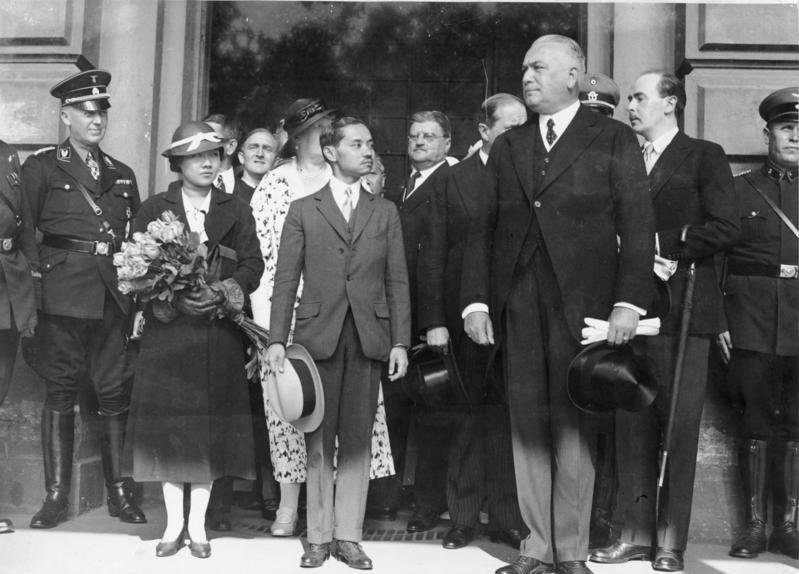
King Prajadhipok and Queen Rambai Barni with Konstantin von Neurath in Nazi Germany, 1934

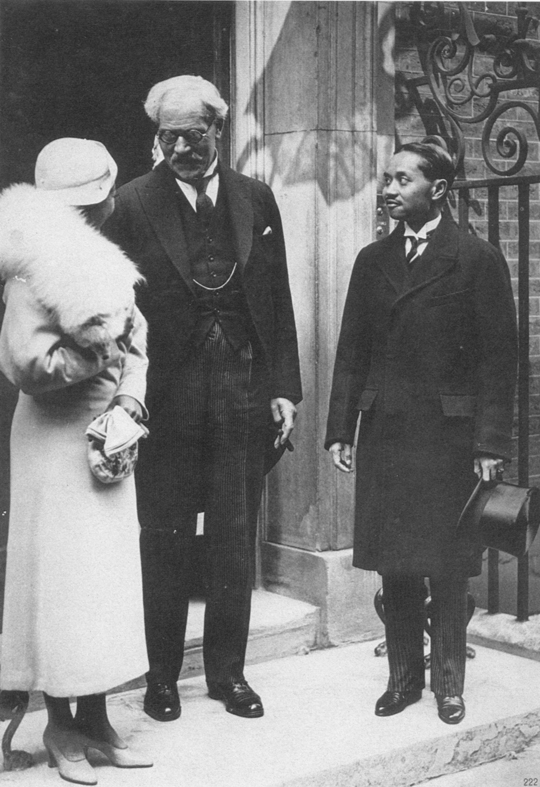
King Prajadhipok and Queen Rambai Barni with British Premier Ramsay MacDonald at Number 10 Downing Street, 1934

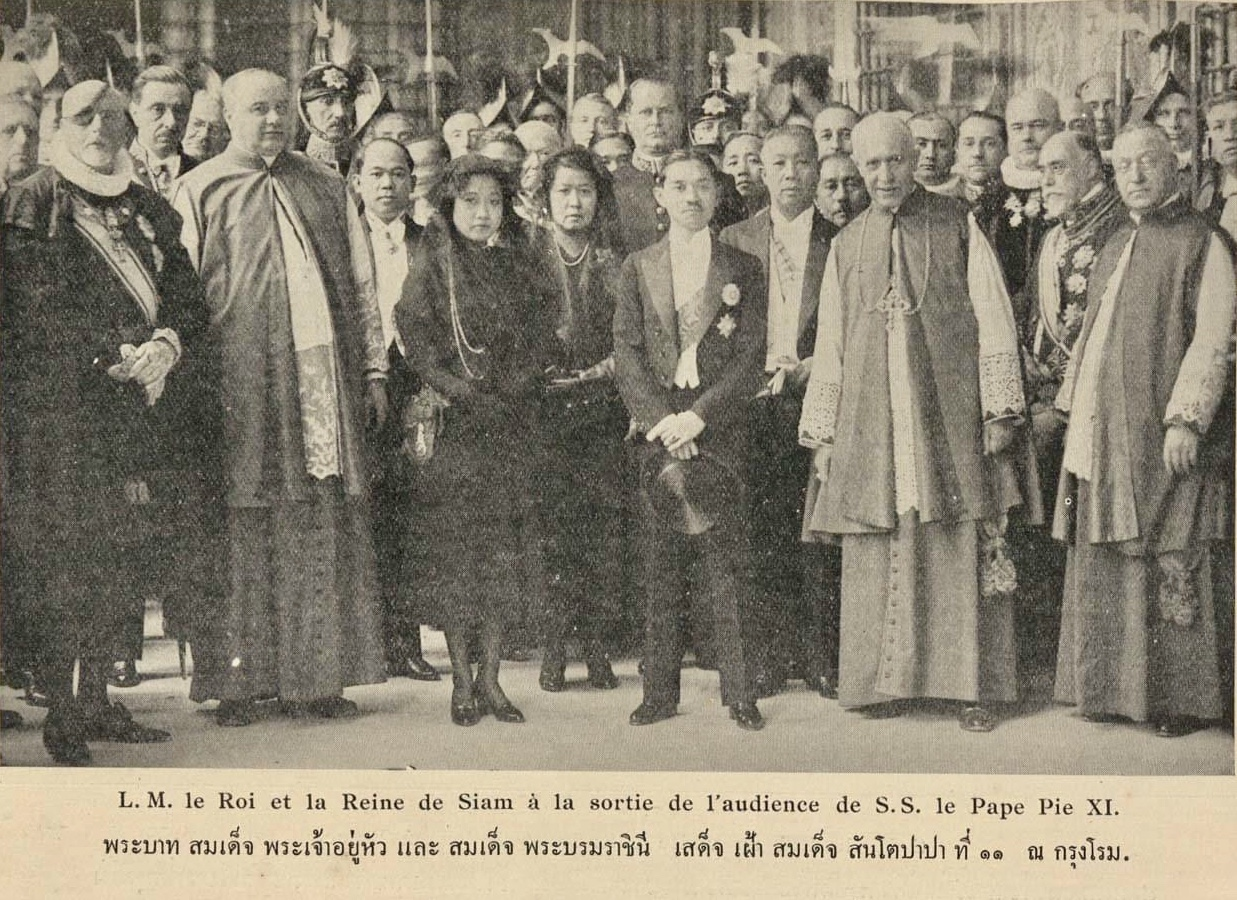
King Rama VII and Queen Rambai Barni after an audience with Pope Pius XI at Vatican City, 1934

== Abdication ==
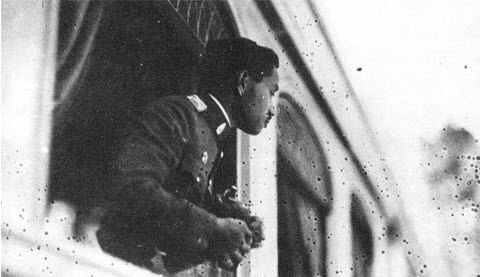
Prajadhipok looking outside a train, c. 1930

The People's Party rejected the ultimatum, and on 2 March 1935, Prajadhipok abdicated, to be replaced by Ananda Mahidol. Prajadhipok issued a brief statement criticising the regime that included the following phrases, since often quoted by critics of Thailand's slow political development.

I am willing to surrender the powers I formerly exercised to the people as a whole, but I am not willing to turn them over to any individual or any group to use in an autocratic manner without heeding the voice of the people.

== Life after abdication and death ==
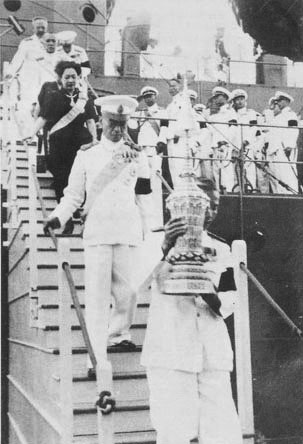
Queen Rambhai Barni bringing Prajadhipok's ashes back to Thailand, 1949

Prajadhipok spent the rest of his life with Queen Rambhai Barni in England. At the time of abdication, the couple lived at Knowle House, in Surrey, just outside London. However, this house was not suitable considering his health, so they moved to a smaller house in Virginia Water (still in Surrey), but with more space. The house was named "Hangmoor", but wishing to give it a more pleasant name, he called it "Glen Pammant", an anagram of an old Thai phrase tam pleng nam. They remained there for two years. They moved again to Vane Court, the oldest house in the village of Biddenden in Kent. He led a peaceful life there, gardening in the morning and writing his autobiography in the afternoon.

In 1938 the royal couple moved to Compton House, in the village of Wentworth in Virginia Water, Surrey.

Due to bombing by the German Luftwaffe in 1940, the couple again moved, first to a small house in Devon, and then to Lake Vyrnwy Hotel in Powys, Wales, where the former king had a heart attack. The couple returned to Compton House, as he expressed his preference to die there. King Prajadhipok died from heart failure on 30 May 1941.

His cremation was held at the Golders Green Crematorium in north London. It was a simple affair attended by just Queen Ramphai and a handful of close relatives. Queen Ramphaiphanni stayed at Compton House for a further eight years before she returned to Thailand in 1949, bringing the king's ashes back with her.

== Legacy ==
Historian David K. Wyatt writes that Prajadhipok was "a hard-working, effective executor" who was "intellectually equal to the demands of his office", and whose main failing was to underestimate the Bangkok elite's growing nationalism, and that "[a]s late as his death in exile, many would have agreed with his judgement that a move towards democracy in 1932 was premature." The idea that the 1932 revolution was premature is echoed in a common royalist sentiment that proliferated as the Thai monarchy regained status over ensuing decades. In this view, Prajadhipok is credited as the "father of Thai democracy", who already intended to usher in democracy before the Khana Ratsadon prematurely carried out their revolution. Prajadhipok's abdication statement is often cited in support of this view. Later historians have challenged it as a myth, citing evidence that Prajadhipok's political maneuvers leading up to his abdication had more to do with preserving the power and status of the declining monarchy than challenging the Khana Ratsadon's actual failures to uphold democratic ideals.

== Tributes to Prajadhipok ==
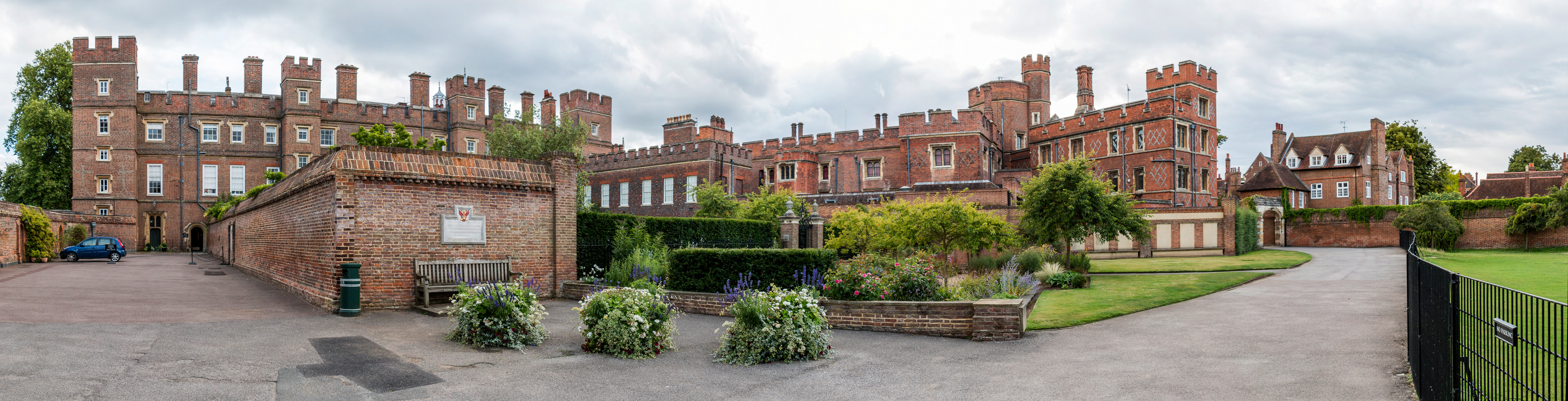
In 1928, he donated funds to Eton College to create a new garden between College Field and the Provost's Garden. A commemorative plaque bearing the Siamese Garuda was installed on the garden wall to mark his contribution. He returned to the school in 1934 and inspected the completed "King of Siam's Garden."

Styles of: King Prajadhipok; Rama VII of Siam
- Reference style: His Majesty
- Spoken style: Your Majesty

Royal Monograms of King Prajadhipok
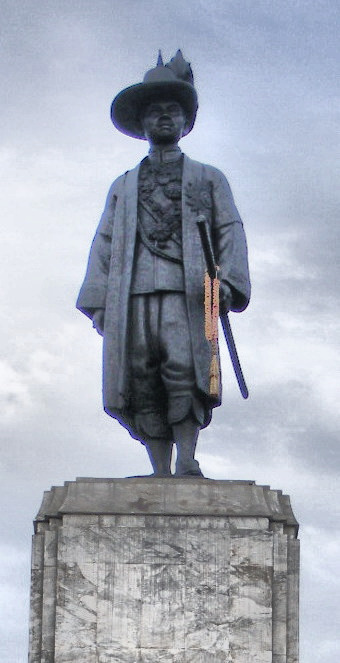
A Statue of the king in Sukhothai Thammathirat Open University, Nonthaburi

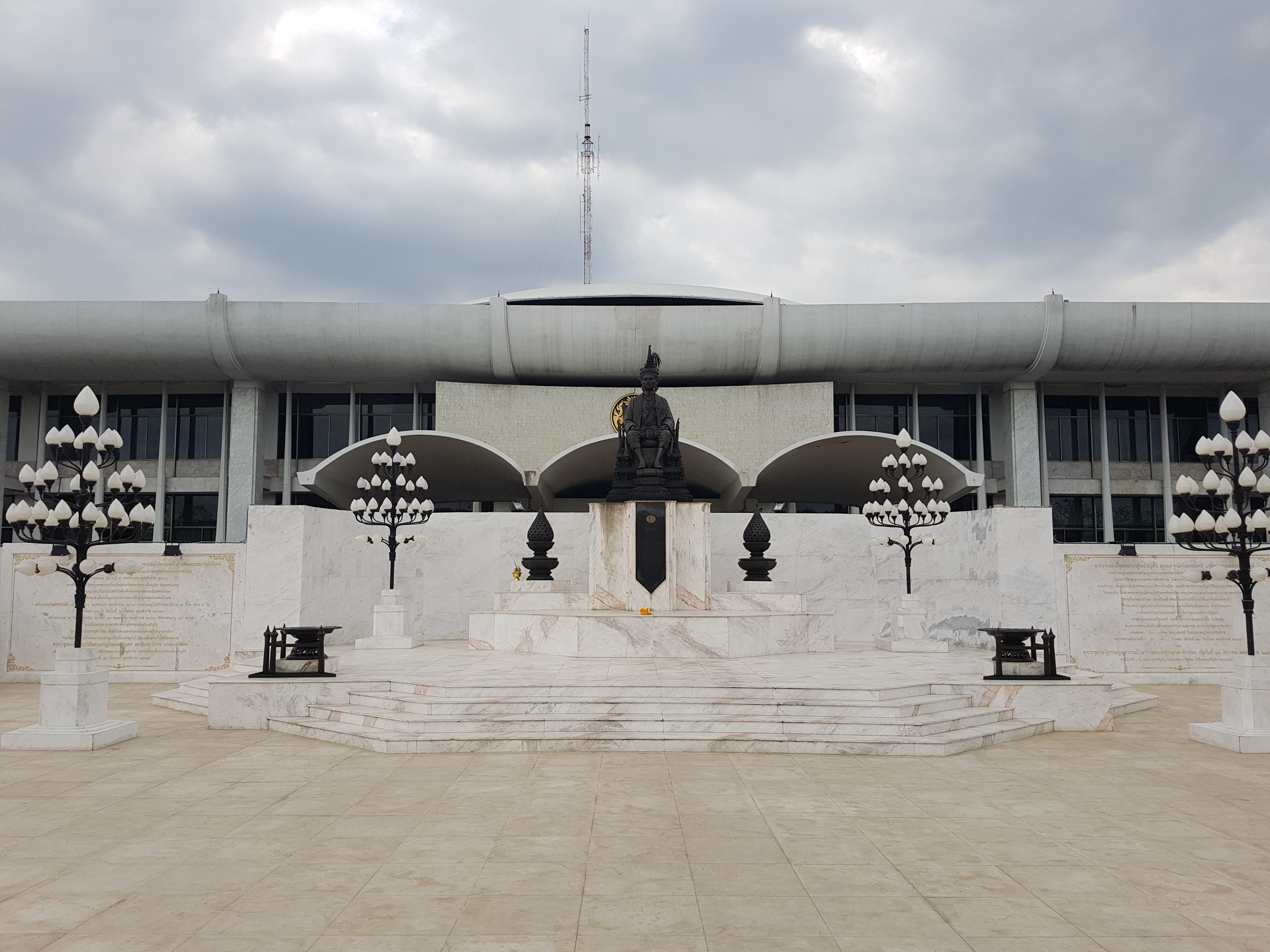
King Rama VII statue at Parliament House of Thailand

=== Infrastructure ===
- Sukhothai Thammathirat University
- Phra Pok Klao Bridge, Bangkok
- Prajadhipok Road, Bangkok
- Prapokklao Hospital, Chanthaburi Province

=== Military ranks ===
- Field Marshal, Admiral of the Fleet

=== National honours ===
- The Most Illustrious Order of the Royal House of Chakri
- The Ancient and Auspicious Order of the Nine Gems
- Knight Grand Cordon of the Order of Chula Chom Klao
- Ratana Varabhorn Order of Merit
- Knight Grand Commander of the Order of Rama
- Knight Grand Cordon of the Order of the White Elephant
- Knight Grand Cordon of the Order of the Crown of Thailand
- Dushdi Mala Pin of Service to the Nation (Civilian)
- Chakra Mala Medal
- King Rama V Royal Cypher Medal, First Class
- King Rama VI Royal Cypher Medal, First Class
- King Rama VII Royal Cypher Medal, First Class
- Rajini Medal

=== Foreign honours ===
- Japan :
  - Grand Cordon of the Order of the Chrysanthemum
- Denmark :
  - Knight of the Order of the Elephant, 8 February 1926
- Netherlands :
  - Knight Grand Cross of the Order of the Netherlands Lion
- UK :
  - Knight Grand Cross of the Order of the Bath (GCB)
- Belgium :
  - Grand Cordon of the Order of Leopold, 1926
- France :
  - Grand Cross of the Legion of Honour
- Kingdom of Italy :
  - Knight of the Supreme Order of the Most Holy Annunciation
- Sweden :
  - Knight of the Order of the Seraphim
- Monaco :
  - Grand Cross of the Order of Saint-Charles, 1 March 1934
- Hungary :
  - Grand Cross of the Hungarian Order of Merit
- Czechoslovakia :
  - Order of the White Lion, First Class

=== Honorary degrees ===
- 1931: Doctor of Laws, George Washington University

== See also ==
- King Prajadhipok Museum
- Siamese coup d'état of 1932
- History of Thailand (1932–1973)
- List of covers of Time magazine (1930s)

== Notes ==
Prajadhipok (Rama VII) House of Chakri Born: 8 November 1893 Died: 30 May 1941
Regnal titles
Preceded by Vajiravudh	King of Siam; 26 November 1925 – 2 March 1935	Succeeded by Ananda Mahidol
