= Royal Cemetery at Wat Ratchabophit =

Royal cemetery of the Thai Chakri dynasty in Bangkok

Coordinates: 13.749076°N 100.496693°E

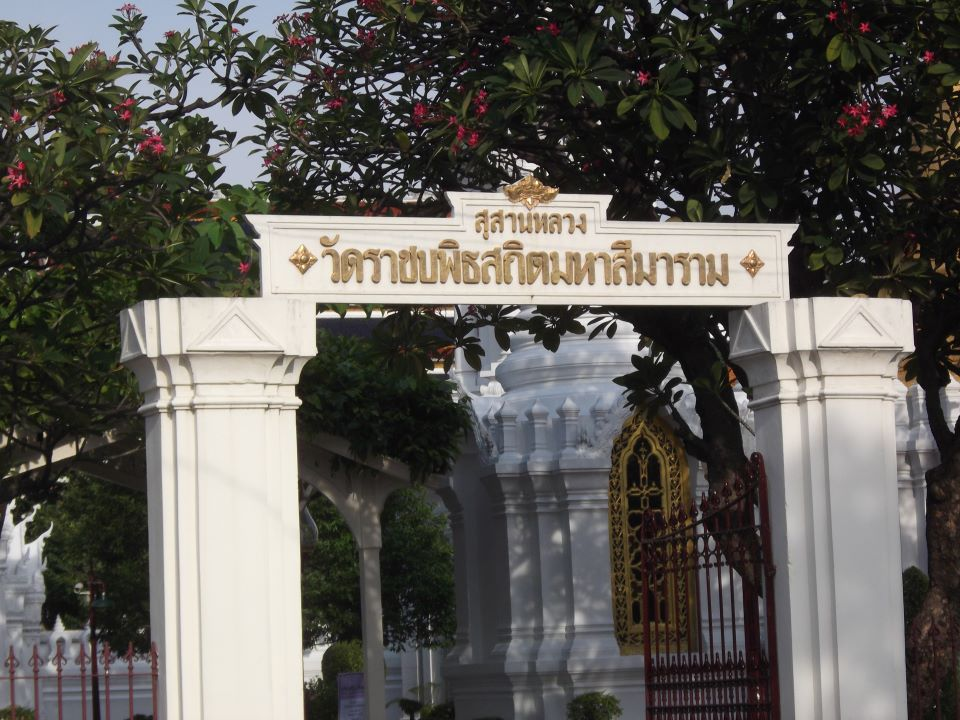
The entrance of Royal Cemetery

The Royal Cemetery is located at the western side of the grounds of Wat Ratchabophit in Bangkok .

The cemetery contains monuments to numerous members of the Thai Royal Family, particularly those most closely related to King Chulalongkorn. Each monument is given a number, displayed externally at the base of the structure in Thai numerals. There are 34 in all, but one (No. 3) has been removed.

== Monuments to Chulalongkorn's Queens Consort ==
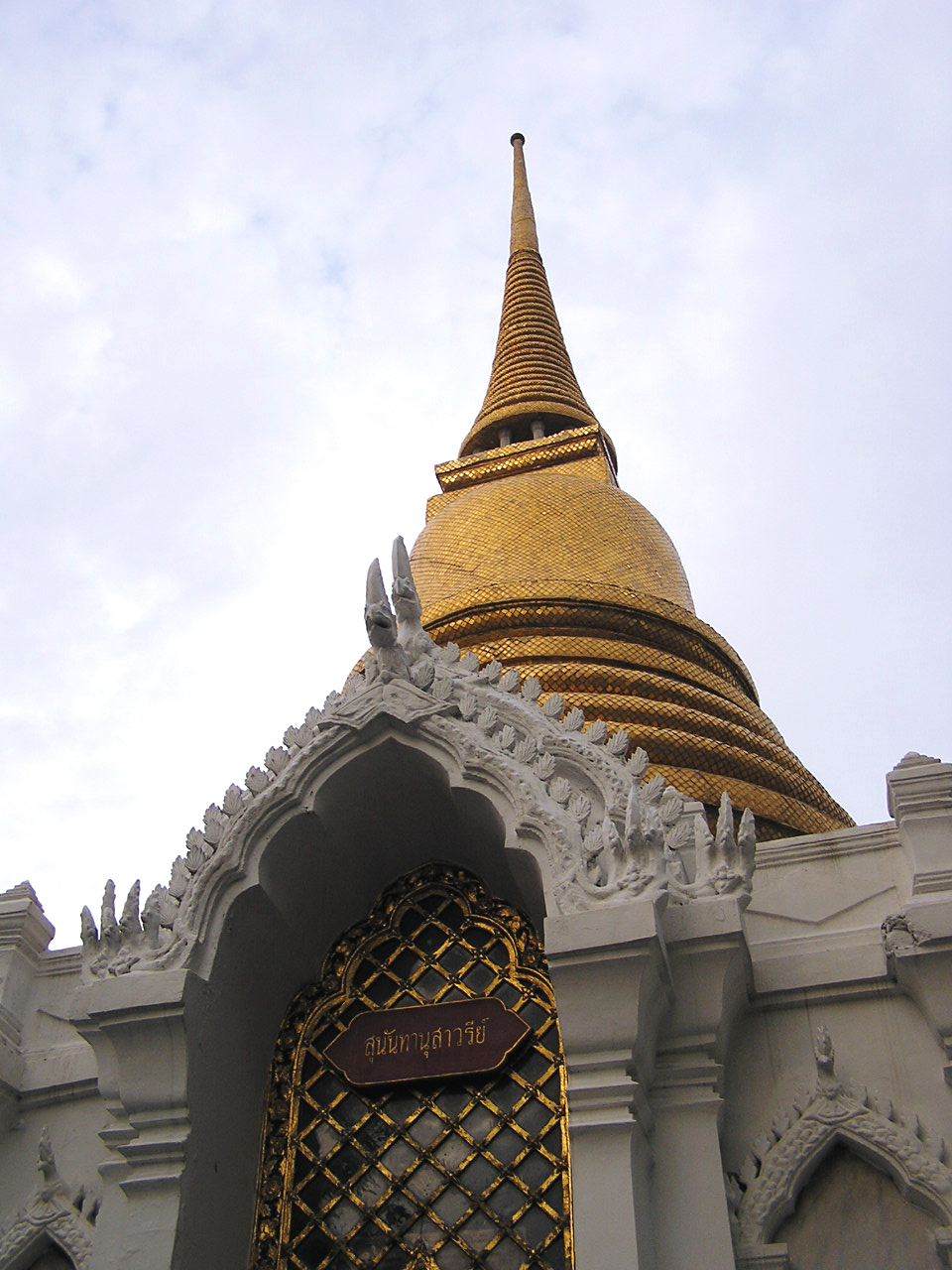
Sunandha Nusavarya Memorial

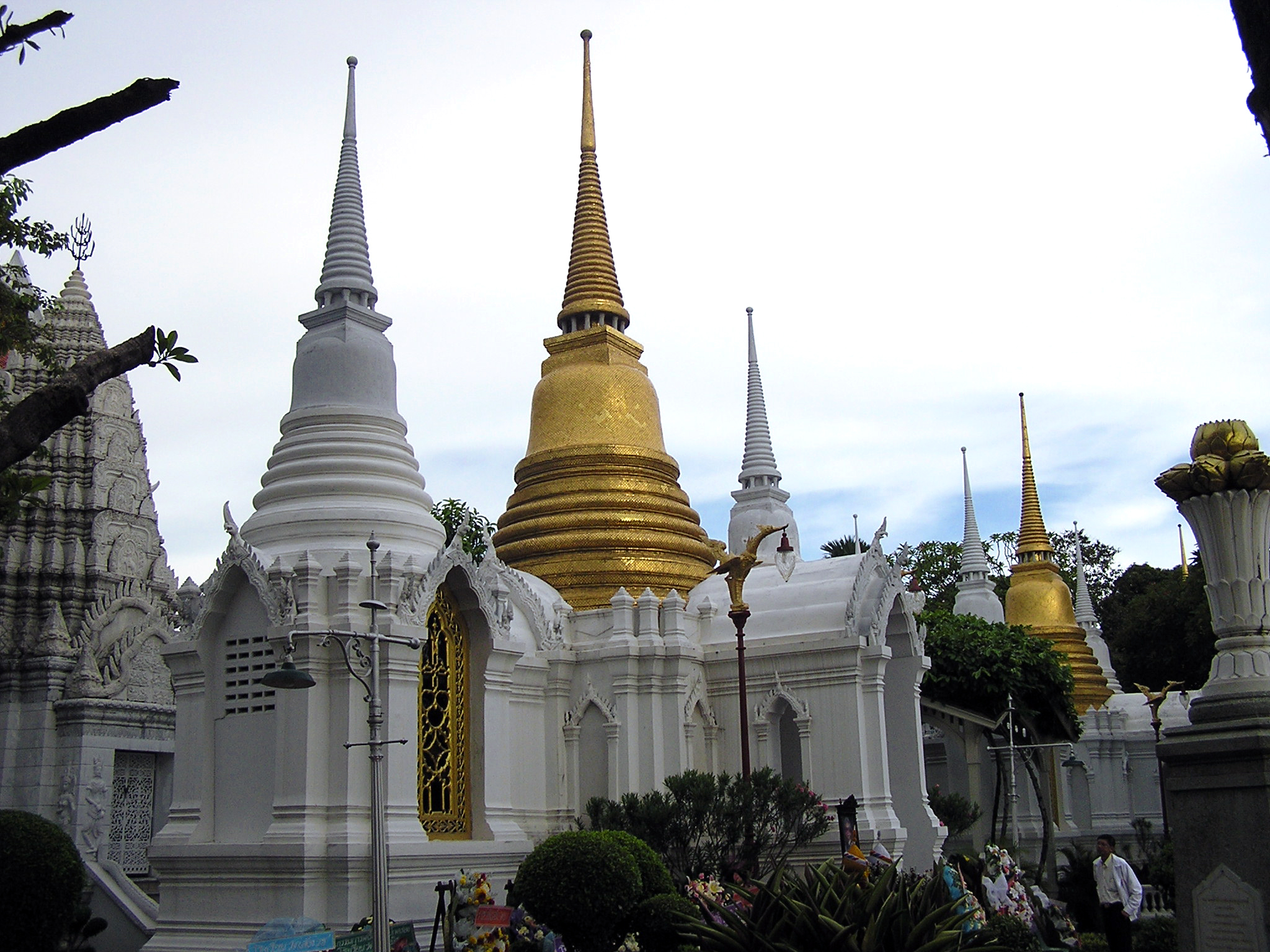
Rangsi Vadhana Memorial

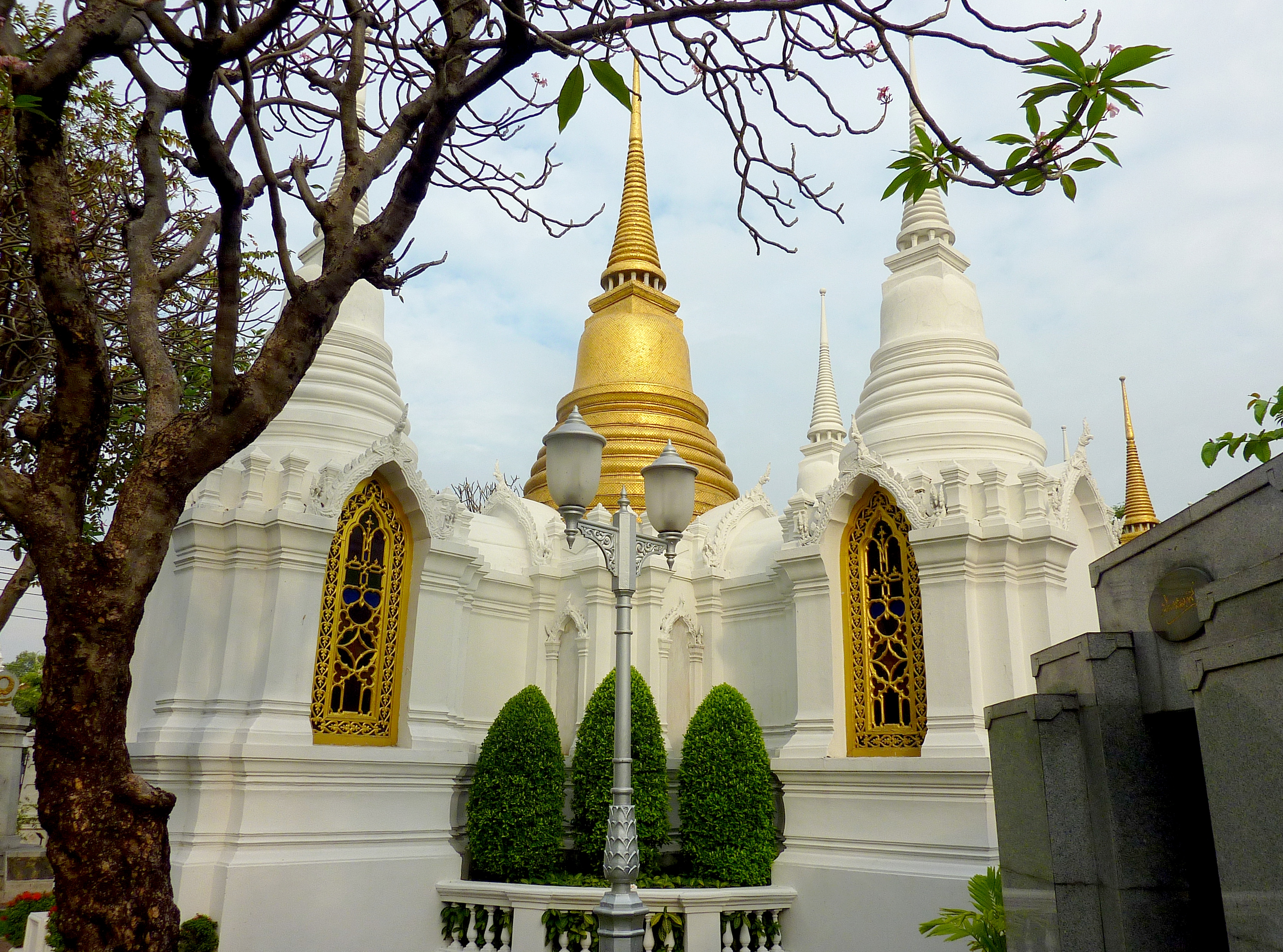
Saovabha Pratisthana Memorial

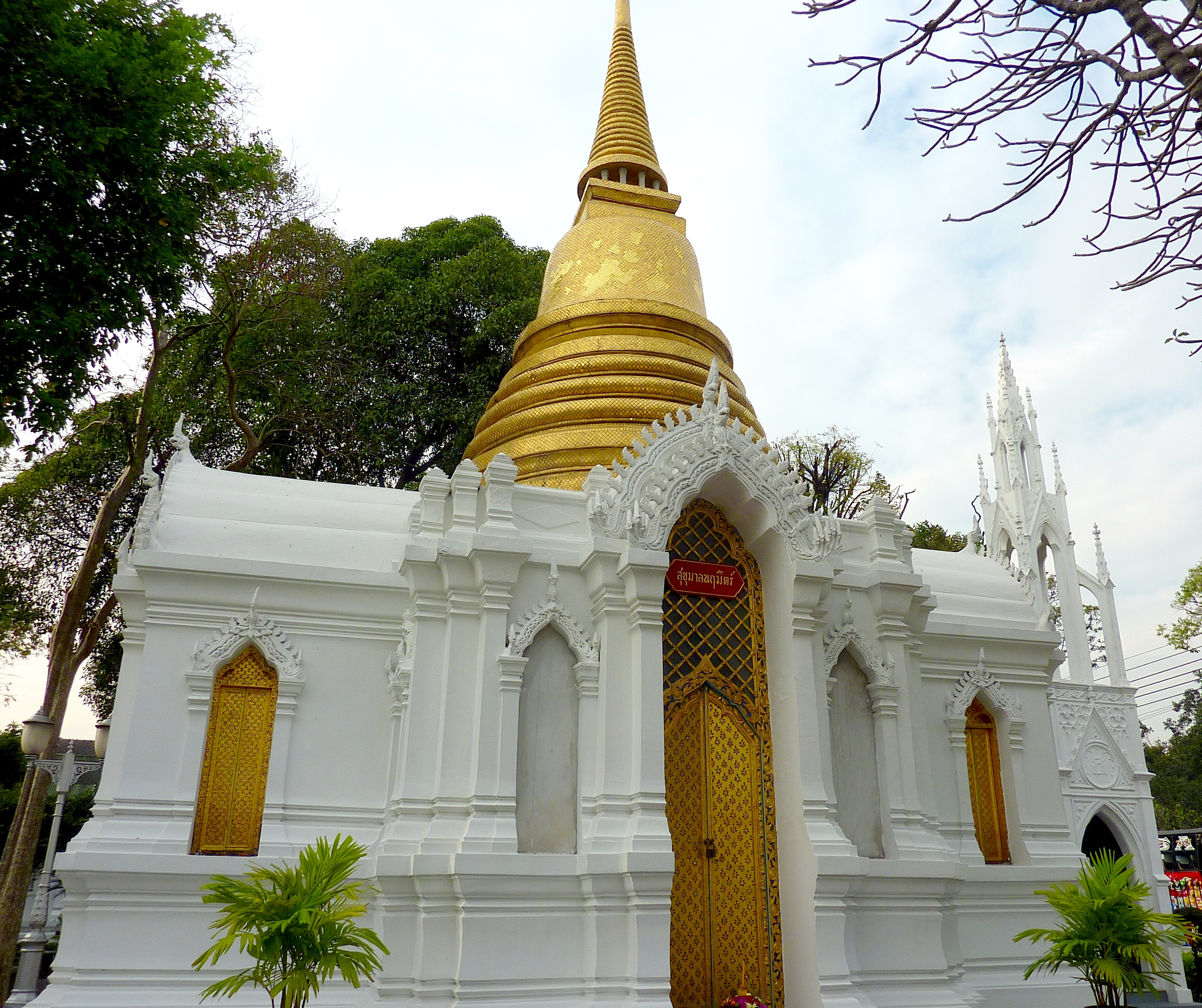
Sukhumala Narumitra Memorial

Among the many monuments in the grounds are four prominent white buildings, each dedicated to one of King Chulalongkorn's four principal wives. They also contain the ashes of descendants of the wives to whom they are dedicated. These four structures are listed below with their designated memorial numbers in parentheses. The interred include:

=== Sunandha Nusavarya Memorial (6) ===
- Queen Sunanda Kumariratana (1860–1880)
  - Princess Kannabhorn Bejaratana (1878–1880)

=== Rangsi Vadhana Memorial (9) ===
- Line of Queen Savang Vadhana :
  - Crown Prince Maha Vajirunhis (1878–1895)
  - Prince Isariyalongkorn (1879)
  - Princess Vichitra Chiraprabha (1881)
  - Sommatiwongse Varodaya, Prince of Si Thammarat (1882–1899)
  - Valaya Alongkorn, Princess of Phetchaburi (1884–1938)
  - Princess Sirabhorn Sobhon (1888–1898)
  - Mahidol Adulyadej, Prince of Songkla (1891–1929)
    - Srinagarindra, Princess Mother of Thailand (née Sangwan Talapat; 1900–1995)
    - Galyani Vadhana, Princess of Naradhiwas (1923–2008)
  - Princess Unnamed (1893)

=== Saovabha Pratisthana Memorial (11) ===
- Line of Queen Saovabha Phongsri :
  - Bahurada Manimaya, Princess Debnariratana (1878–1887)
  - Line of King Vajiravudh :
    - Princess Bejaratana Rajasuda (1925–2011)
  - Prince Tribejrutama Dhamrong (1881–1887)
  - Chakrabongse Bhuvanath, Prince of Phitsanulok (1882–1920)
    - Prince Chula Chakrabongse (né Prince Bongsechakra Chakrabongse; 1908–1963)
    - Mom Elisabeth Chakrabongse na Ayudhaya (née Hunter; 1915–1971)
  - Prince Siriraj Kakudhabhanda (1885–1887)
  - Princess Unnamed (1884)
  - Asdang Dejavudh, Prince of Nakhon Rajasima (1889–1924)
  - Chudadhuj Dharadilok, Prince of Phetchabun (1892–1923)
    - Princess Bunchiradhorn Chudadhuj (née Princess Chirabunyini Jumbala; 1897–1980)
    - Princess Sudasiri Sobha (1921–1998)
    - Prince Varananda Dhavaj (1922–1990)

=== Sukhumala Narumitra Memorial (19) ===
- Chao Chom Manda Samli, Royal Consort of Rama IV (née Bunnag; 1835–1900)
  - Princess Busabong Boekban (1859–1876)
  - Queen Sukhumala Marasri (1861–1927)
    - Suddha Dibyaratana, Princess of Rattanakosin (1877–1922)
    - Paribatra Sukhumbandhu, Prince of Nakhon Sawan (1881–1944)
      - Princess Prasongsom Paribatra (née Jayanta; 1886–1956)
      - Chumbhotbongs Paribatra, Prince of Nakhon Sawan (1904–1959)
        - Princess Marsi Sukhumbhand Paribatra (1931–2013)
      - Princess Siriratana Busabong (1906–1990)
      - Princess Sudhavongse Vichitra (1907–2003)
      - Princess Bisit Sobsamaya (1908–1974)
        - Mom Rajawonge Bilaslaksana Bunyapana (née Kitiyakara; 1940–1997)
      - Princess Churairatana Siriman (1909–2000)
      - Princess Chandrakantamani (1912–1977)
      - Princess Unnamed (1918–1919)
      - Prince Priyajati Sukhumbandh (1920–1922)
      - Prince Sukhumabhinanda (1923–2003)
  - Nabhaborn Prabha, Princess Dibayaratana Kiritkulini (1864–1958)

== Other monuments ==
The other monuments come in a variety of shapes, styles and sizes. The number associated with each monument is shown in parentheses. Monument No. 3 is defunct and no longer extant, its contents having been moved into Monument No. 2.

=== Chao Chom Manda Sae Monument (1) ===
This is a Gothic-style masonry structure with marble floor and stairs, and the base is adorned with mountains.

- Chao Chom Manda Sae (née Rajanatish; 1868–1925)
  - Prince Khajera Chirapradidha (1888–1888)
  - Princess Abbhantripaja (1889–1934)
  - Princess Dibyalangkarn (1890–1932)

=== Chao Khun Phra Prayurawongse Monument (2) ===
Referred to as the "Little Temple," it is a single story, four-walled house of European style, with a tiled roof. The wooden doors and windows feature stained glass panels. Within are housed the ashes of two consorts of King Rama V from the Bunnag family (Pae and Mod) and their descendants. These include:

- Chao Khun Chom Manda Pae (née Bunnag; 1854–1943)
  - Srivilailaksana, Princess of Subarn (1868–1904)
  - Princess Suvabaktra Vilayabanna (1873–1930)
  - Princess Bandhavanna Varobhas (1875–1891)
- Chao Chom Manda Mod (née Bunnag; 1862–1932)
  - Abhakara Kiartivongse, Prince of Chumphon (1880–1923)
    - Mom Choi Abhakara na Ayudhaya (née Vichitranuj; 1890–1974)
    - Mom Chalaem Abhakara na Ayudhaya (1888–1976)
    - Charubatra Subhajalasaya (née Princess Charubatra Abhakara; 1904–1973)
    - Sirimabang-orn Riensuvarn (née Princess Sirimabang-orn Abhakara; 1904–1975)
    - Prince Aditya Dibabha (1904–1946)
    - Princess Samora Bamdoeng Abhakara (1905–1930)
    - Roengchitra Charaeng Sucharitakul (née Princess Roengchitra Charaeng Abhakara; 1905–1993)
      - Mom Rajawongse Toemsaengkhai Karnasut (née Rabibadhana; 1925–1954)
        - Ruch Karnasut (1948–1963)
    - Prince Damkaeng-riddhi Abhakara (1905–1962)
      - Line of Mom Rajawongse Itthinan Abhakara :
        - Mom Luang Paramabha Abhakara (1968–1985)
    - Prince Khanchitbol Abhakara (1906–1966)
    - Prince Rangsiyakorn Abhakara (1906–1965)
      - Mom Rajawongse Jayakorn Abhakara (1947–1954)
    - Prince Ruchayakorn Abhakara (1916–2006)
  - Suriyong Prayurabandhu, Prince of Jaya (1884–1919)
    - Prince Rasmisuriyan Suriyong (1913–1988)
    - Prince Kitisuriyobhas Suriyong (1916–1938)
    - Prince Atiwongsevivasvasti Suriyong (1917–2006)
      - Mom Sulalivan Suriyong na Ayudhaya (née Suvarndat; 1920–1992)
      - Line of Mom Rajawongse Dhitisan Suriyong :
        - Mom Luang Ambai Suriyong (1968–1993)
      - Prince Suriyadatrangsanga Suriyong (1917–1971)
      - Princess Suvarnkumari Suriyong (1918–1966)
- Line of Vanna Vaidhayakara, Prince Naradhip Bhongseprabhan :
  - Mom Rajawongse Vibulkiarti Voravarn (1922–1967)

=== Princess Oraongka Ankayuba Monument (4) ===
This monument is shaped like a prang mounted on a four-sided pedestal of grey and white marble.

- Princess Oraongka Ankayuba (1881–1882)

=== Hem Memorial (5) ===
This memorial is a plinth with inscribed tablets set on a square base atop a short stairway. Inside are contained the ashes of the following figures:

- Chao Chom Manda Hem (née Amatayakul; 1864–1931)
  - Princess Hemvadi (née Princess Mandhana Bhavadi; 1892–1972)

=== Lopburi-Style Triple Prang (7) ===
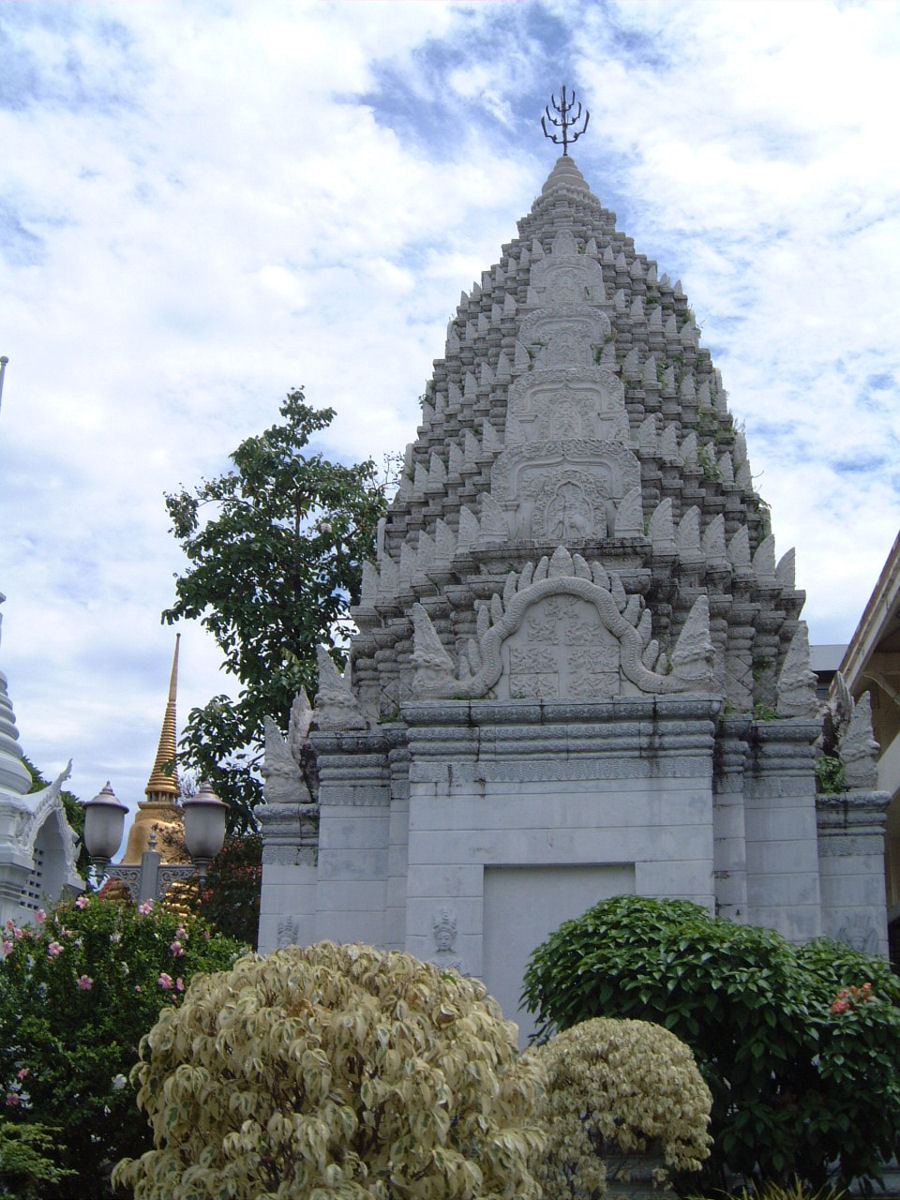
Lopburi-Style Triple Prang

This monument is modeled after Prang Sam Yot, a temple in Lopburi. It is adorned with Khmer style artwork. Naga stairs lead to doors whose frames are topped with ornate brick-and-stucco cornices and trim. Those whose ashes are housed here include Princess Consort Saisavali Bhiromya and her progeny.

- Chao Chom Manda Chin, consort of Ladawan, Prince Bhumindra Bhakdi
  - Princess Consort Ubolratana Narinaga, Princess Akkavorarajakalaya (née Princess Bua Ladawan; 1847–1901)
    - Yaovamalaya Narumala, Princess of Sawankhalok (1873–1909)
  - Princess Consort Saovabhark Nariratana (née Princess Piu Ladawan; 1854–1887)
    - Chandra Saradavara, Princess of Phichit (1873–1905)
  - Princess Consort Saisavali Bhiromya, Princess Suddhasininat (née Princess Sai Ladawan; 1863–1905)
    - Yugala Dighambara, Prince of Lopburi (1882–1932)
      - Princess Chalermkhetra Mangala (née Bhanubandhu; 1893–1957)
      - Prince Bhanubandhu Yugala (1910–1995)
        - Mom Luang Soiraya Yugala (née Sanidvongs; 1909–1984)
        - Mom Bunlom Yugala na Ayudhaya (née Nartrakul; 1913–1974)
        - Prince Thitibandhu Yugala (1935–1995)
      - Prince Chalermbol Dighambara (1913–1991)
        - Mom Thongphai Yugala na Ayudhaya (née Payurato; 1917–1944)
        - Mom Thongtham Yugala na Ayudhaya (née Payurato; 1924–2000)
        - Princess Chamadevi Yugala (1933–1942)
        - Princess Visakha Yugala (1941–1984)
      - Prince Anusorn Mongkolkarn (1915–1998)
        - Mom Ubol Yugala na Ayudhaya (née Suriddhi; 1923–2003)
        - Chandracharassri Paibullert (née Princess Chandracharassri Yagala; 1937–2005)
        - Line of Prince Chulcherm Yugala :
          - Mom Siriporn Yugala na Ayudhaya (née Senalak; 1951–1989)
    - Princess Nabhachorn Chamrassri (née Princess Kajera Chamras; 1884–1889)
    - Malini Nobhadara, Princess of Srisatchanalai (1885–1924)
    - Nibha Nobhadol, Princess of Uthong (1886–1935)

=== Chao Chom Manda Yoi Monument (8) ===
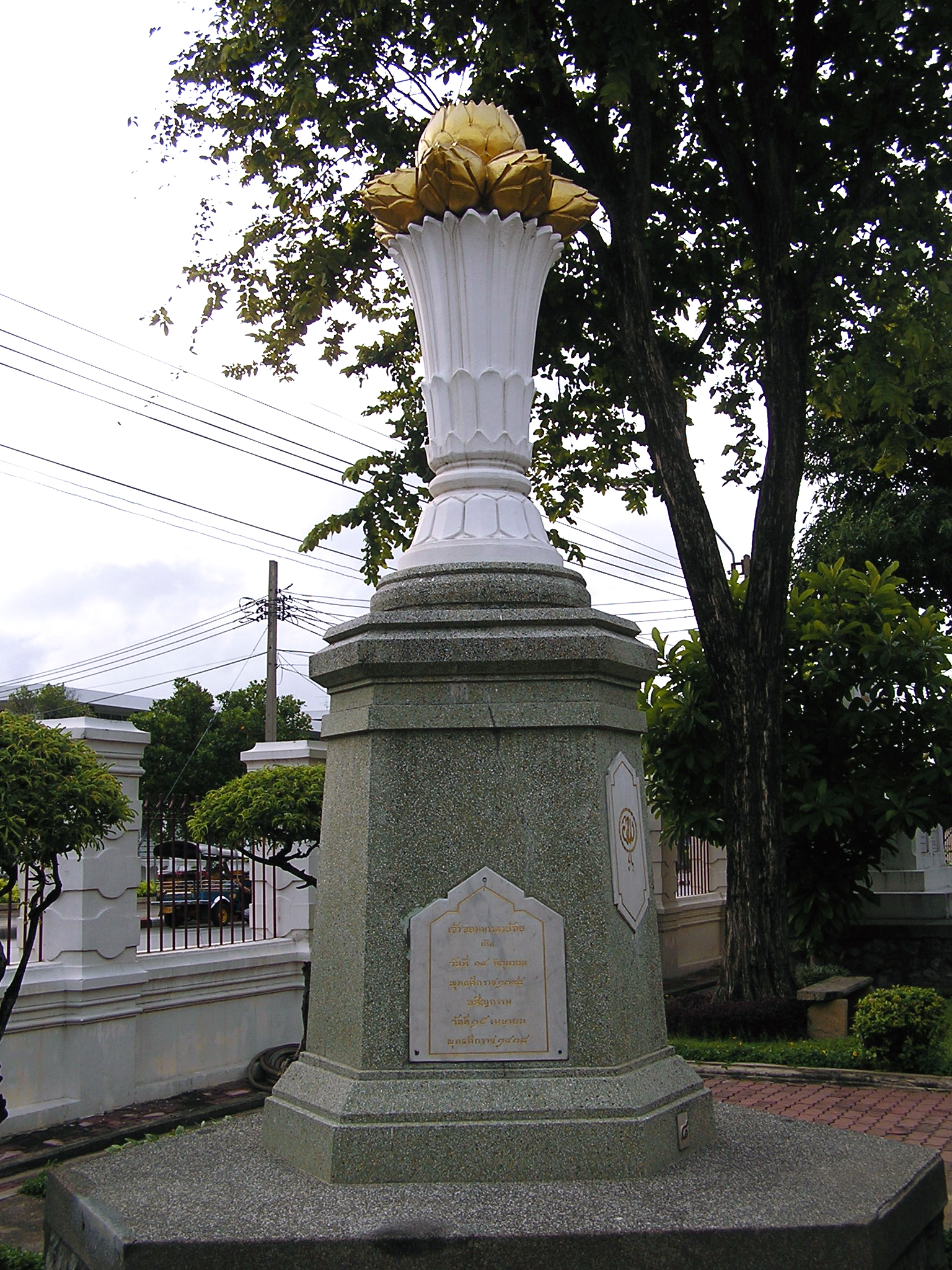
Mausoleum of Yoi Isarankura

This monument features lace-like lotus petals emerging from a pleated vase set atop a tall hexagonal plinth. The inscriptions are on marble slabs.

- Chao Chom Manda Yoi (née Isarankura; 1855–1896)
  - Princess Orabindu Benyabhak (1873–1935)

=== Monument to Royal Princess the 84th (10) ===
A round column decorated with flowers atop a square base. On top of the column's capital there is a sculpture of a cloth-draped urn. Inside are the ashes of the 84th child of King Rama V, born to Chao Chom Chiu Kapitatha.

- Princess Unnamed (1892–1893)

=== Prince Isariyabhorn Monument (12) ===
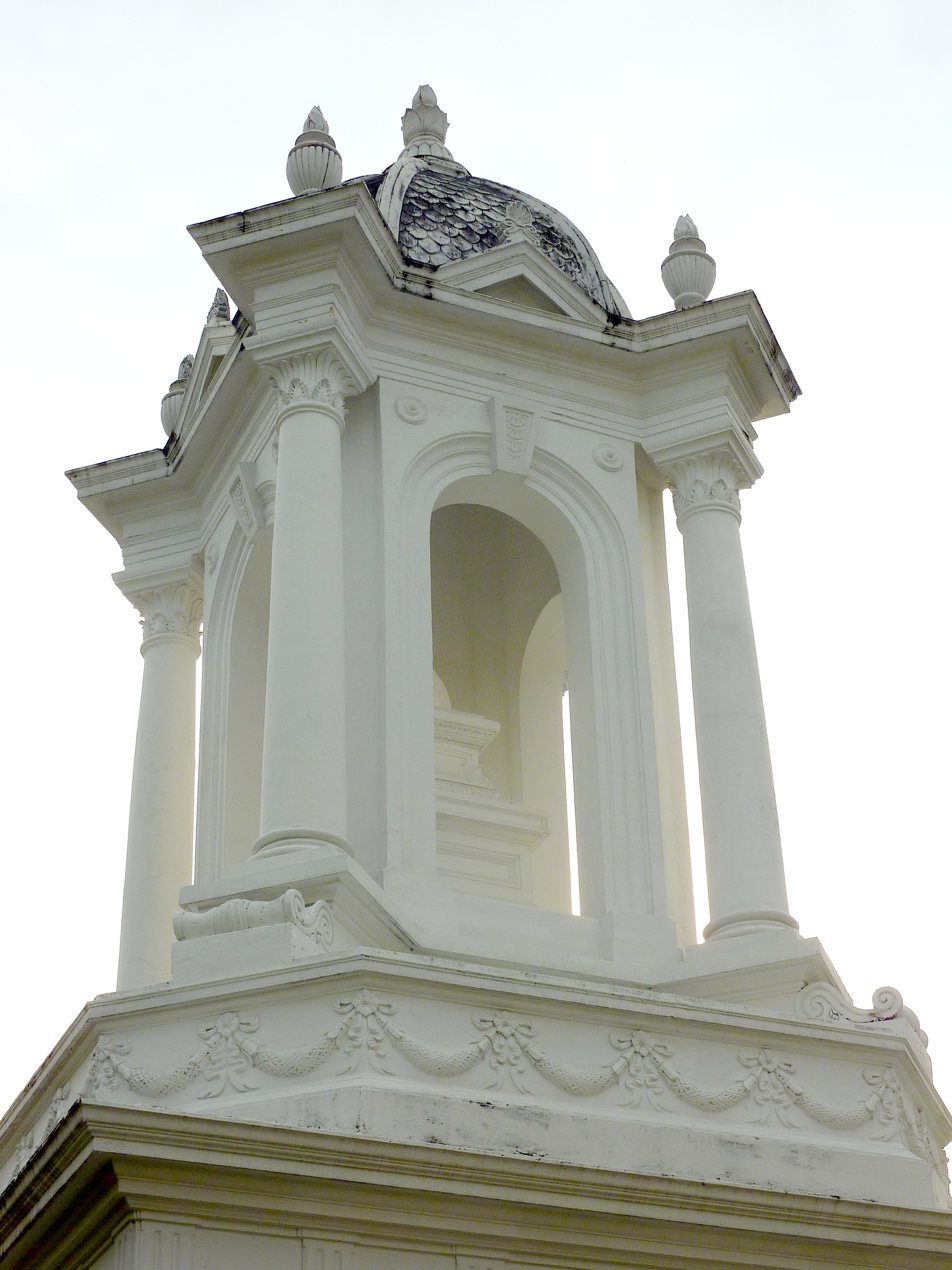
Prince Isariyabhorn Monument

- Prince Isariyabhorn (1888–1892)

=== Iam 2495 Memorial (13) ===
A square-cross-sectioned plinth atop a hexagonal base adorned with large stones. There is a marble plaque on the plinth. On the stone parapet is a wreath.

- Chao Chom Iam (née Bunnag; 1873–1952)

=== Chao Chom Manda Talab Monument (14) ===
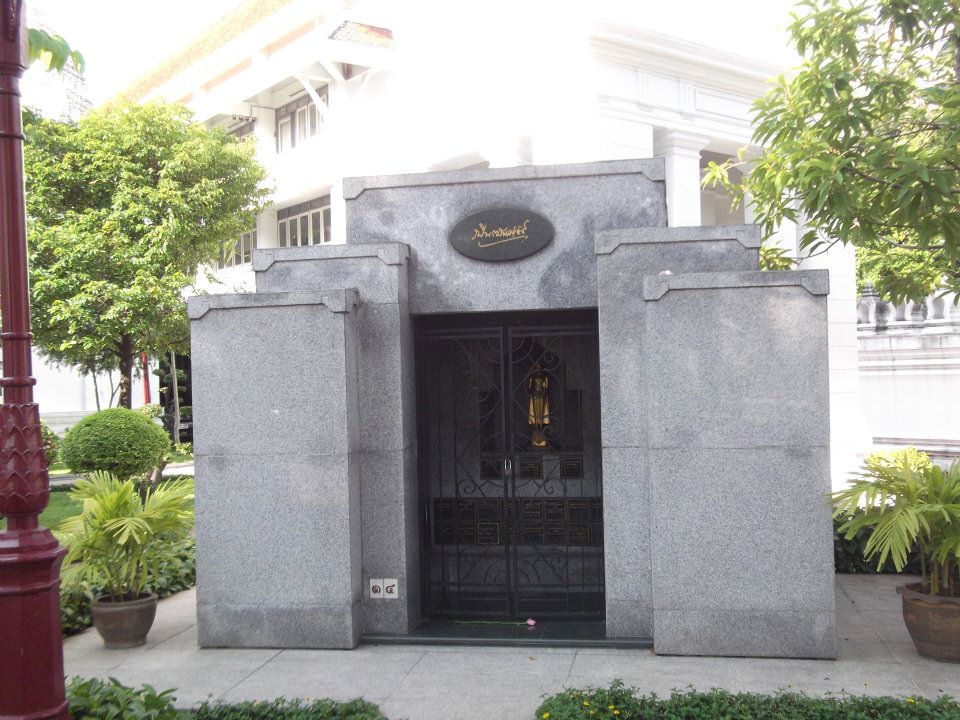
Chao Chom Manda Talab Monument

- Chao Chom Manda Talab (née Ketudat; 1852–1929)
  - Princess Ajrabarni Rajkanya (1872–1910)
  - Raphi Phatthanasak, Prince of Ratchaburi (1874–1920)
    - Mom On Rabibadhana na Ayudhaya (1877–1935)
    - Princess Bimba Rambai Sonakul (née Rabibadhana; 1898–1967)
    - Prince Khaisaeng Rabi Rabibadhana (1899–1978)
      - Mom Rajawongse Sakdi Rabi Rabibadhana (1939–1997)
    - Princess Suriya Prabha Kritakara (née Rabibadhana; 1901–1970)
    - Prince Vimavaditya Rabibadhana (1902–1958)
      - Princess Vinita Rabibadhana (née Kitiyakara; 1913–1998)
    - Princess Javalit Obhas Kitiyakara (née Rabibadhana; 1904–1932)
    - Prince Akas Damkoeng Rabibadhana (1905–1932)
    - Prince Ploeng Nabhadol Rabibadhana (1906–1985)
    - Prince Thakol Kraival Rabibadhana (1909–1980)
      - Mom Talab Rabibadhana na Ayudhaya (née Srirojana; 1914–1998)
    - Prince Ravibarn Bairojana Rabibadhana (1912–1988)
      - Mom Rajawongse Direkriddhi Rabibadhana (1950–1997)
    - Princess Duangdibaya Jotichaengla Abhakara (née Rabibadhana; 1914–1999)
    - Princess Ditaya Songklod Chakrabandhu (née Rabibadhana; 1916–2010)
    - Gandharos Rangsi Saengmani (née Princess Gandharos Rangsi Rabibadhana; 1917–1983)
      - Mom Rajawongse Vudhiros Rangsi Vudhijaya (1937–1943)
    - Rambai Srisa-anga Sanidvongs (née Princess Rambai Srisa-anga Rabibadhana; 1919–2000)

=== Chao Chom Sae Monument (15) ===
- Chao Chom Sae (née Bunnag; 1892–1978)

=== Eob 2487 Memorial (16) ===
- Chao Chom Eob (née Bunnag; 1879–1944)

=== Sariranidhan Monument (17) ===
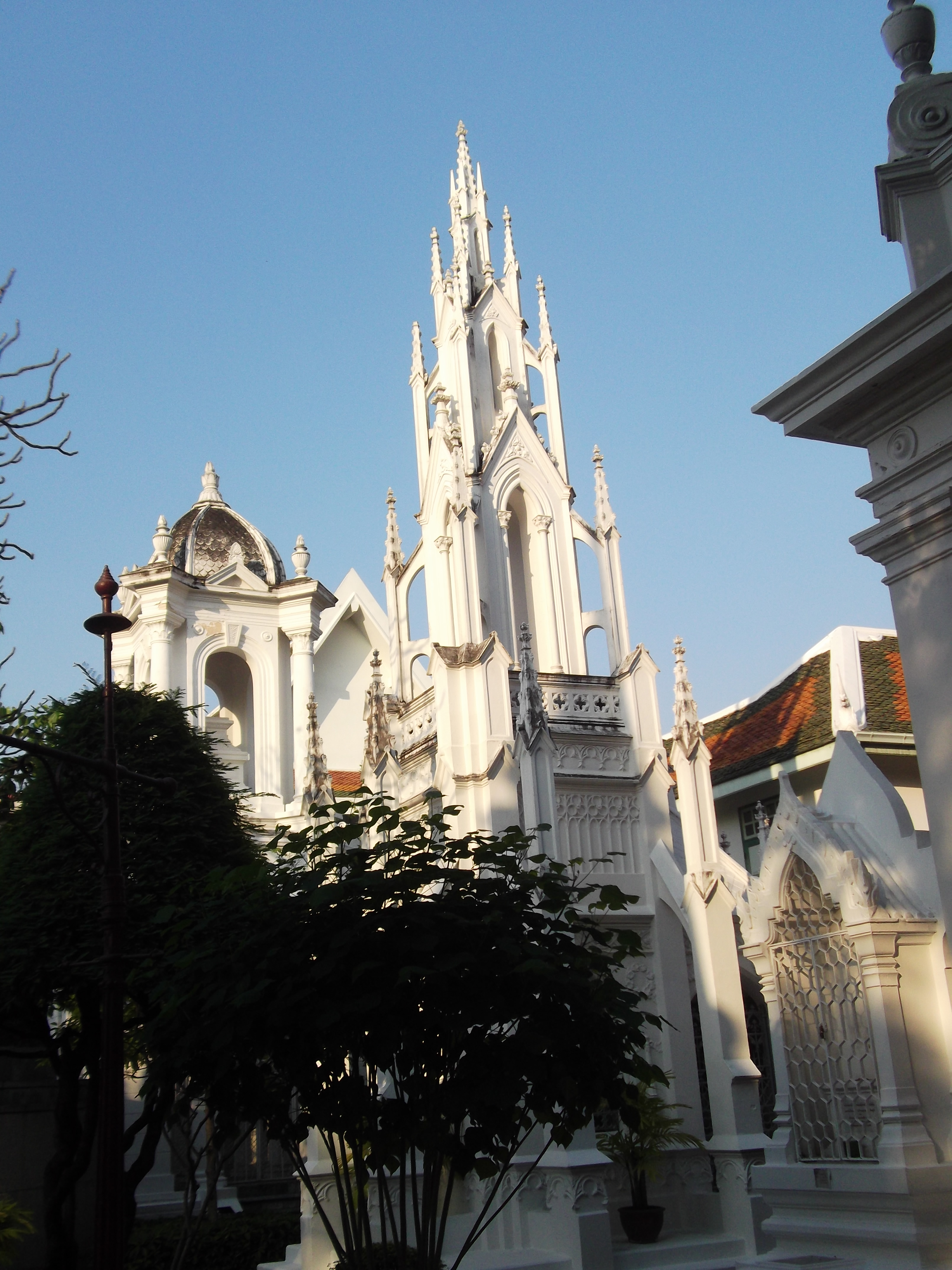
Sariranidhan Monument

- Chao Chom Manda Phrom (?–1898)
  - Princess Prabha Bannabilaya (1885–1948)
  - Princess Prabai Bannabilas (1885–1886)
  - Prince Samaya Vudhirodom (1888–1889)
  - Princess Vapi Busbakara (1891–1982)

=== Princess Lavad Voraong Monument (18) ===
- Princess Lavad Voraong (1891–1893)

=== Chao Chom Manda Khae Monument (20) ===
- Chao Chom Manda Mom Rajawongse Khae (née Puengbun; 1847–1926)
  - Princess Phongpraphai (1867–1942)

=== Princess consort Dararasmi Monument (21) ===
- Princess Consort Dara Rasmi (1873–1933)
  - Princess Vimolnaka Nabisi (1889–1892)
  - Chatrasuda Vongthongsri (née Princess Chatrasuda Chatrajaya; 1920–1996)

=== Princess Komala Saovamala Monument (22) ===
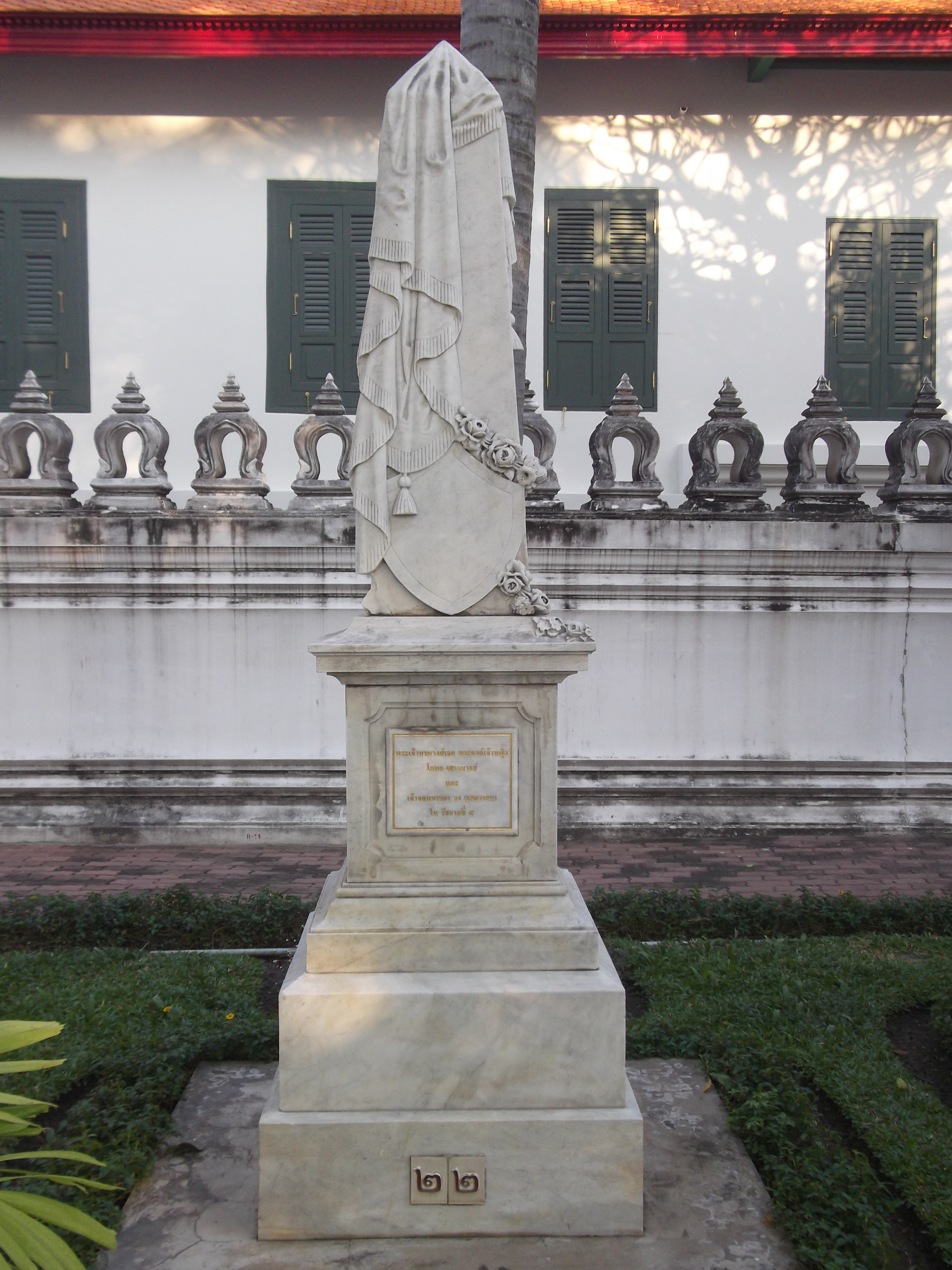
Princess Komala Saovamala Monument

- Princess Komala Saovamala (1887–1890)

=== Chao Chom Manda Chandra Monument (23) ===
- Chao Chom Manda Chandra (née Sukumalachandra; 1862–1911)
  - Princess Sasibongse Prabai (1881–1934)

=== Chao Chom Manda Nueang Monument (24) ===
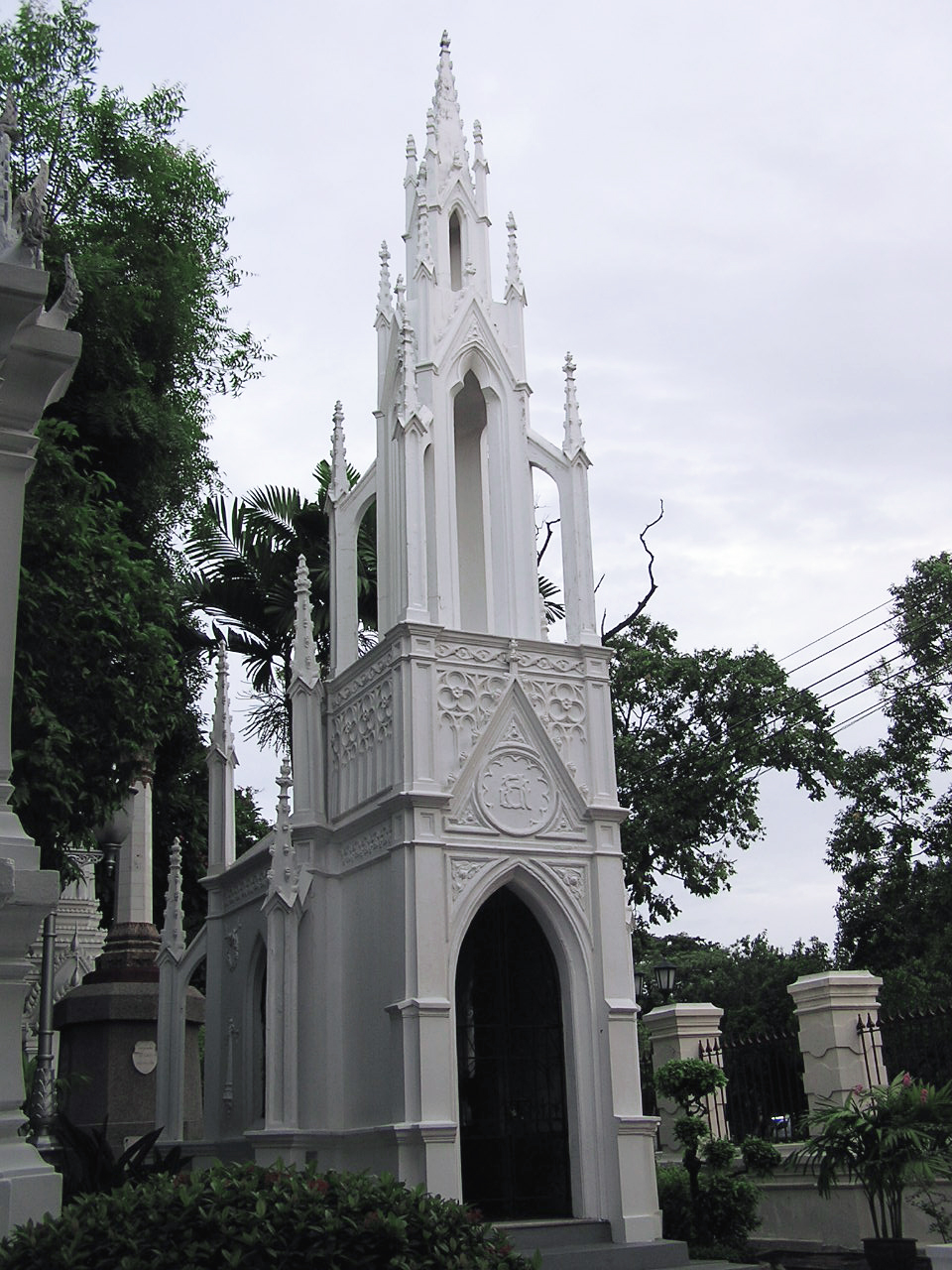
Chao Chom Manda Nueang Monument

- Chao Chom Manda Mom Rajawongse Nueang (née Sanidvongs; 1864–1885)
  - Princess Yaovabha Bongsanid (1884–1934)
  - Rangsit Prayurasakdi, Prince of Chainat (1885–1951)
    - Mom Elisabeth Rangsit na Ayudhaya (née Scharnberger; 1892–1973)
    - Prince Piyarangsit Rangsit (1913–1990)
      - Princess Vibhavadi Rangsit (née Princess Vibhavadi Rajani; 1920–1977)
    - Prince Sanid Prayurasakdi Rangsit (1917–1995)

=== Orn 2476 Memorial (25) ===
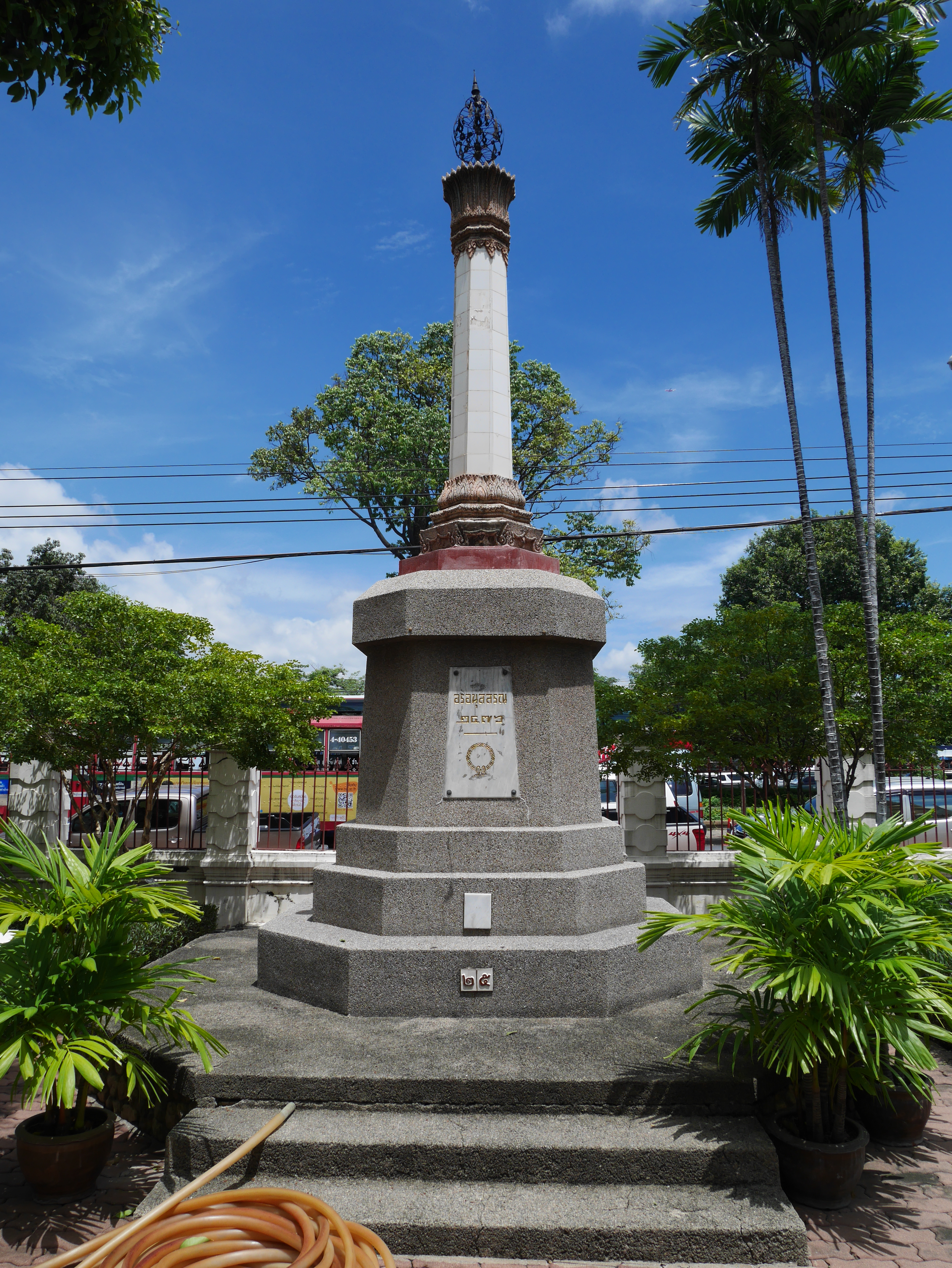
Orn 2476 Memorial

- Chao Chom Manda Orn (née Bunnag; 1867–1969)
  - Princess Oraprabandh Rambai (1885–1933)
  - Princess Adisaya Suriyabha (1889–1963)

=== Chao Chom Manda Chaem Monument (26) ===
- Chao Chom Manda Chaem (née Kalyanamitra; 1856–1909)
  - Pravitra Vadhanodom, Prince of Prachinburi (1875–1919)
    - Mom Chuen Pravitra na Ayudhaya (née Kalyanamitra; 1885–1934)
    - Prince Chitra Pridi Pravitra (1908–1954)
      - Mom Luang Muaenchandra Pravitra (née Darakara; 1910–1986)
      - Mom Rajawongse Chetchandra Pravitra (1935–2007)
    - Prince Vikromsurasiha Pravitra (1911–1949)
    - Princess Kanishtha Kumari Pravitra (1919–1951)

=== Chatrajaya 2480 Memorial (27) ===
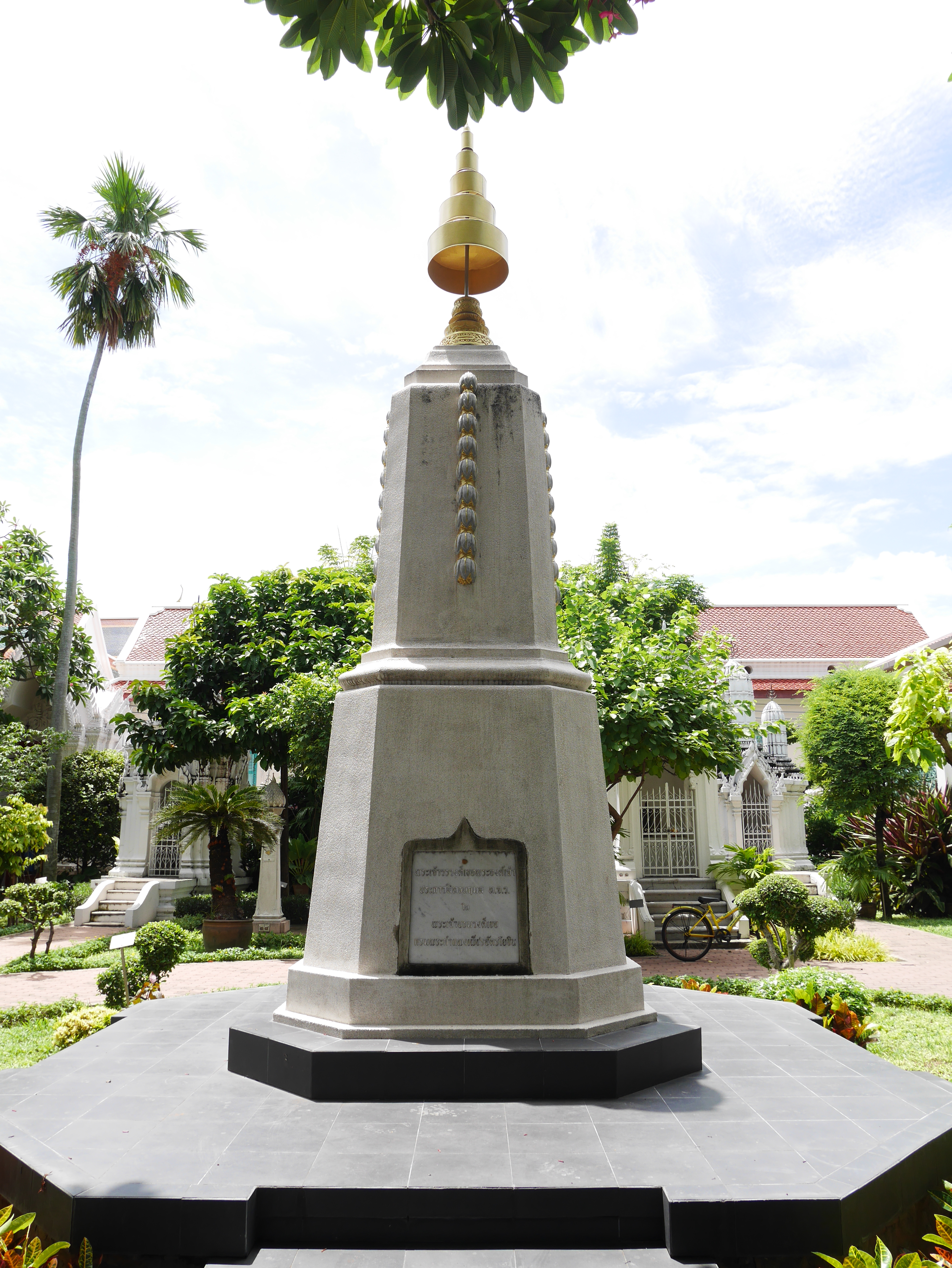
Chatrajaya 2480 Memorial

- Purachatra Jayakara, Prince of Kamphaengphet (1881–1936)
  - Princess Prabhavasiddhi Narumala (née Chakrabandhu; 1885–1963)
  - Princess Mayurachatra (1906–1970)
  - Prince Prem Purachatra (1915–1981)
  - Princess Vimolchatra (1921–2009)
  - Princess Kanchanachatra Chatrajaya (1921–1988)
  - Prince Dibyachatra Chatrajaya (1934–2010)
  - Prince Bibulayachatra Chatrajaya (1935–1956)

=== Chao Chom Ab Monument (28) ===
- Chao Chom Ab (née Bunnag; 1881–1961)

=== Chao Chom Manda Sud Monument (29) ===
- Chao Chom Manda Sud (née Sukumalachandra; 1851–1912)
  - Princess Voralaksanavadi (1872–1926)

=== Chao Chom Manda Saeng Monument (30) ===
- Chao Chom Manda Saeng (née Kalyanamitra; 1854–1898)
  - Princess Bhadrayuvadi (1876–1913)
  - Princess Charoensri Chanamayu (1878–1916)

=== Chao Chom Manda Ruen Monument (31) ===
- Chao Chom Manda Ruen (née Sundarasaradura; 1865–1922)
  - Princess Bismai Bimalasataya (1881–1936)

=== Chao Chom Manda Morakot Monument (32) ===
- Chao Chom Manda Morakot (née Benyakul; 1855–1915)
  - Princess Chudharatana Rajakumari (1872–1930)
  - Benbadhanabongse, Prince of Phichai (1884–1909)
    - Barnabenkhae Kritakara (née Princess Barnabenkhae Benbadhana; 1905–1974)
    - Prince Baobenbadhana Benbadhana (1906–1960)
      - Mom Rajawongse Badhana Mahindara Benbadhana (1937–1980)

=== Chao Chom Manda Chum (33) ===
- Chao Chom Manda Chum (née Krairoek; 1869–1911)
  - Princess Adorndibyanibha (1889–1958)
  - Princess Suchitra Bharani (1890–1918)

=== Chao Chom Manda Uam (34) ===
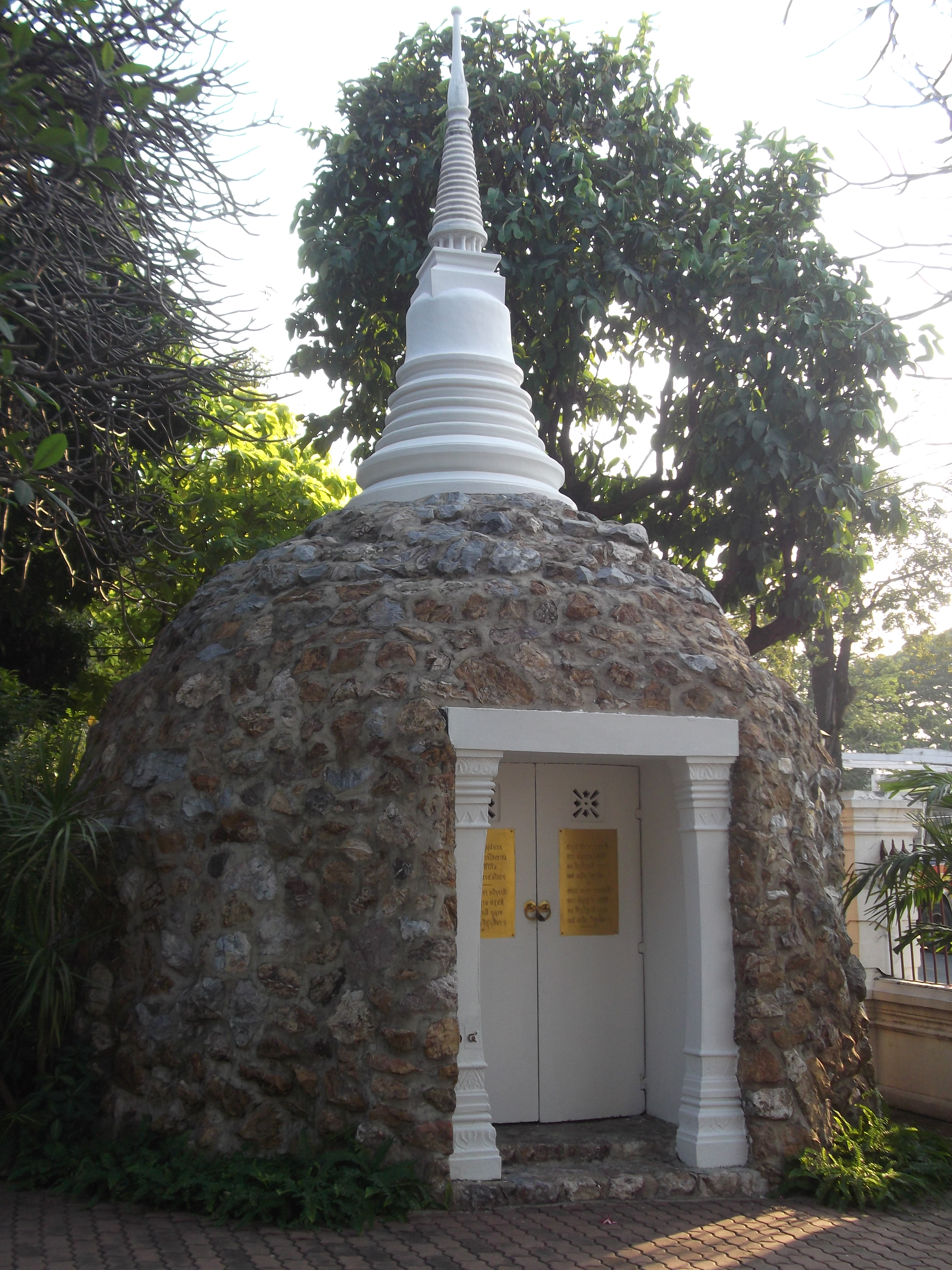
Chao Chom Manda Uam

- Chao Chom Manda Uam (née Bisalayabutra; 1856–1891)
  - Prince Kitiyakara Voralaksana, Prince of Chanthaburi (1874–1874)
    - Princess Apsarasaman Devakul (1877–1939)
    - Prince Kiartikamchorn Kitiyakara (1896–1902)
    - Prince Amorn Samarnlaksana Kitiyakara (1897–1968)
      - Prince Chavalit Obhas Rabibadhana (1903–1932)
    - Prince Nakkhatra Mangkala Kitiyakara, Prince of Chanthaburi (1898–1953)
      - Bua Snidvongs (1909–1999)
      - Line of Queen Sirikit :
        - Line of Princess Ubol Ratana
          - Poom Jensen (1983–2004)
    - Princess Kamolpramoj Kitiyakara (1898–1974)
    - Prince Manojmanop Kitiyakara (1901–1902)
    - Prince Kachornjob Kitikhun Kitiyakara (1902–1967)
    - Princess Bibulaya Benchang Kitiyakara (1903–1969)
    - Princess Badhana Kanana Kitiyakara (1903–1966)
    - Princess Kalyankasombati Kitiyakara (1905–1942)
    - Prince Chomchit Kitiyakara (1905–1948)
    - Prince Samakhom Kitiyakara (1905–1988)
    - Princess Chitra Banchong Kitiyakara (1907–1944)
    - Princess Songapsara Kitiyakara (1906–1988)
    - Princess Bhornbhibatra Kitiyakara (1907–1925)
    - Princess Sarada Chandra Kitiyakara (1907–1923)
    - Prince Kolit Kitiyakara (1910–1976)
    - Prince Pudh Kitiyakara (1905–1942)
    - Princess Chiraka Kitiyakara (1913–1975)
    - Prince Chirinanda Kitiyakara (1915–1973)
    - Prince Kitimati Kitiyakara (1915–1982)
    - Prince Suvanit Kitiyakara (1915–1973)
    - Prince Chiridanaya Kitiyakara (1916–1981)
    - Princess Kitipapiya Kitiyakara (1923–2012)

== See also ==
- List of national cemeteries by country
