= Urubongse Rajasombhoj =

Prince of Siam, son of Chulalongkorn

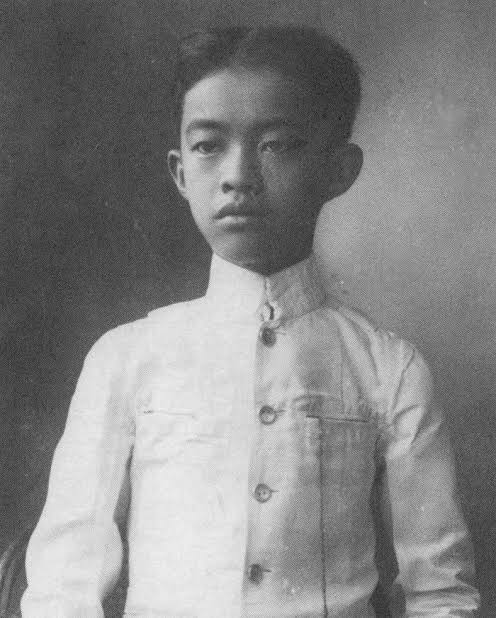
- Prince Urubongs
- Born: 15 October 1893; Grand Palace; Bangkok, Siam
- Died: 20 September 1909 (aged 15); Bangkok, Siam
- House: Chakri Dynasty
- Father: Chulalongkorn (Rama V)
- Mother: Luean Niyavananda
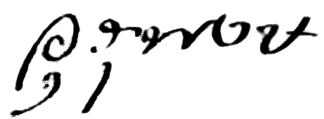
- Signature

Urubongse Rajasombhoj (Thai: อุรุพงศ์รัชสมโภช; RTGS: Uruphong Ratchasomphot; 15 October 1893 – 20 September 1909) was Prince of Siam (later Thailand). He was a son of Chulalongkorn of Siam, titled King Rama V. His mother was The Noble Consort (Chao Chom Manda) Luean Niyavananda, daughter of Lord (Phra) Narindrabhorn and Prik Niyavananda. His elder full sister, Princess Lavad Voraong, died in infancy.

== Life ==
As a child he joined his father on trips to many places, including Europe. Unlike the other princes, Urubongse was not educated in Europe, but instead received instruction from foreign teachers at a private residence in Siam.

He died on 20 September 1909, on King Chulalongkorn's birthday, at the age of 15. His death brought sadness to the members of the Royal Family, especially King Chulalongkorn. The king ordered the building of a bridge in the city with sculptures of Prince Urubongse set into both sides. King Chulalongkorn named the bridge after his son; Uruphong Bridge, where Uruphong Avenue crossed. This bridge was eventually demolished but Uruphong Road and Uruphong Intersection remain today.

=== Muay Thai fighters meet at the funeral ===
When Rajasombhoj died, at the funeral his father King Rama V organised a meet for the Muay Thai fighters from Lopburi, Khorat and Chaiya and the best were granted the noble rank of Muen. That has strengthened the regional styles of Muay Boran cementing their legacy in the sport.
