= Lavad Voraong =

Princess of Siam, daughter of Chulalongkorn

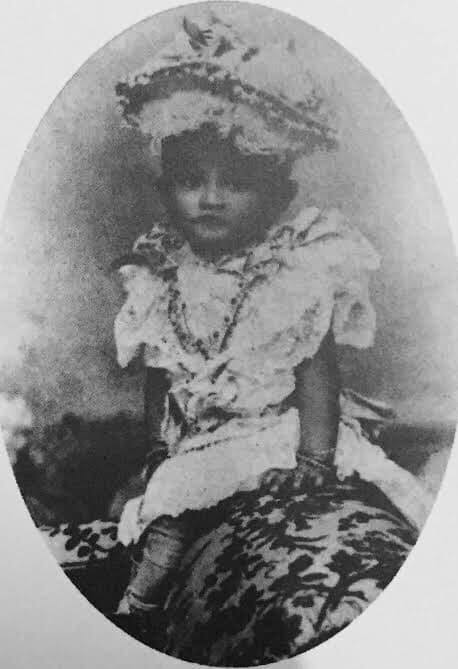
- Born: 30 March 1891; Grand Palace, Bangkok, Siam
- Died: 5 December 1893 (aged 2); Grand Palace, Bangkok, Siam
Names
- Lavad Voraong
- House: Chakri Dynasty
- Father: Chulalongkorn (Rama V)
- Mother: Luean Niyavananda

Lavad Voraong (Thai: ลวาดวรองค์; RTGS: Lawatwora-ong; 30 March 1891 – 5 December 1893), was the Princess of Siam. She was a daughter of Chulalongkorn.

Her mother was The Noble Consort Luean, (née Niyavananda), daughter of Lord (Phra) Narindrabhorn and Prik Niyavananda. She had a younger full brother, Prince Urubongs Rajsombhoj.

Princess Lavad Voraong died on 5 December 1893, at the age of 2.
