= Abbhantripaja =

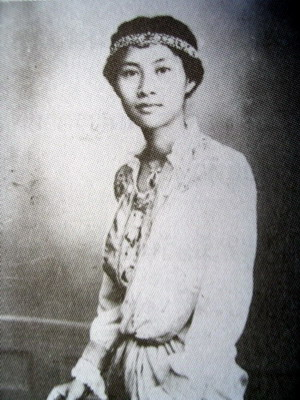
- The Princess in 1915, aged 26
- Born: 31 October 1889; Grand Palace; Bangkok, Siam
- Died: 18 February 1934 (aged 44); Bangkok, Siam
Names
- Abbhantripaja
- House: Chakri dynasty
- Father: Chulalongkorn (Rama V)
- Mother: Chao Chom Manda Sae Rojanadis

Princess Abbhantripaja of Siam (Thai: พระเจ้าบรมวงศ์เธอ พระองค์เจ้าอัพภันตรีปชา; RTGS: Apphantripracha; official title: Phra Chao Boromwongse Ther Phra Ong Chao Abbhantripaja; 31 October 1889 – 18 February 1934), was a Princess of Siam (later Thailand). She was a member of Siamese royal family. She was a daughter of Chulalongkorn, King Rama V of Siam.

Her mother was The Noble Consort (Chao Chom Manda) Sae Rojanadis, daughter of Phraya Abbhantrikamas and Bang Rojanadis. She had two siblings; elder brother and younger sister:

- Prince Khajera Chirapradidha (23 July 1888 – 7 October 1888);
- Princess Dibyalangkarn (17 January 1891 – 4 June 1932).

Princess Abbhantripaja is nicknamed "Khao" which means 'white' in Thai, due to her fair skin. She was regarded as one of King Rama V's most beautiful daughters, alongside her elder half-sister Princess Suddha Dibyaratana (Princess Suthathip). She was described by those who had seen her as taller than average, gentle and often smiling.

Well-educated and fluent in English, the princess cared deeply about education. She founded an all girls' school named Abbhantri Padung (or Kattiyanee Padung) school, which educated young girls, particularly the princess' own ladies-in-waiting and girls from noble or bourgeois families. She gave her old residence to be used as the school building and moved to a smaller house, in which she later died.

Princess Abbhantripaja died on 18 February 1934, at the age of 44 from influenza and complications from kidney disease.

== Honours ==
- Dame Grand Cross (First Class) of the Most Exalted Order of the White Elephant (1896)
- Dame Grand Cross (First Class) of the Most Noble Order of the Crown of Thailand (1900)
- Dame Grand Commander (Second Class, lower grade) of the Most Illustrious Order of Chula Chom Klao (1899)
- King Rama V Royal Cypher Medal, 2nd Class (1911)
- King Rama VI Royal Cypher Medal, 2nd Class (1913)
- King Rama VII Royal Cypher Medal, 2nd Class (1926)

== Ancestry ==
Ancestor of Princess Abbhantripaja
Princess Abbhantripaja	Father: Chulalongkorn, King Rama V of Siam	Paternal Grandfather: Mongkut, King Rama IV of Siam	Paternal Great-grandfather: Buddha Loetla Nabhalai, King Rama II of Siam
Princess Abbhantripaja	Father: Chulalongkorn, King Rama V of Siam	Paternal Grandfather: Mongkut, King Rama IV of Siam	Paternal Great-grandmother: Queen Sri Suriyendra
Princess Abbhantripaja	Father: Chulalongkorn, King Rama V of Siam	Paternal Grandmother: Queen Debsirindra	Paternal Great-grandfather: Prince Sirivongse, the Prince Matayabidaksa
Princess Abbhantripaja	Father: Chulalongkorn, King Rama V of Siam	Paternal Grandmother: Queen Debsirindra	Paternal Great-grandmother: Mom Noi Sirivongs na Ayudhya
Princess Abbhantripaja	Mother: Chao Chom Manda Sae Rojanadis	Maternal Grandfather: Phraya Abbhantrikamas	Maternal Great-grandfather: unknown
Princess Abbhantripaja	Mother: Chao Chom Manda Sae Rojanadis	Maternal Grandfather: Phraya Abbhantrikamas	Maternal Great-grandmother: unknown
Princess Abbhantripaja	Mother: Chao Chom Manda Sae Rojanadis	Maternal Grandmother: Bang Rojanadis	Maternal Great-grandfather: unknown
Princess Abbhantripaja	Mother: Chao Chom Manda Sae Rojanadis	Maternal Grandmother: Bang Rojanadis	Maternal Great-grandmother: unknown
