= Yaovabha Bongsanid =

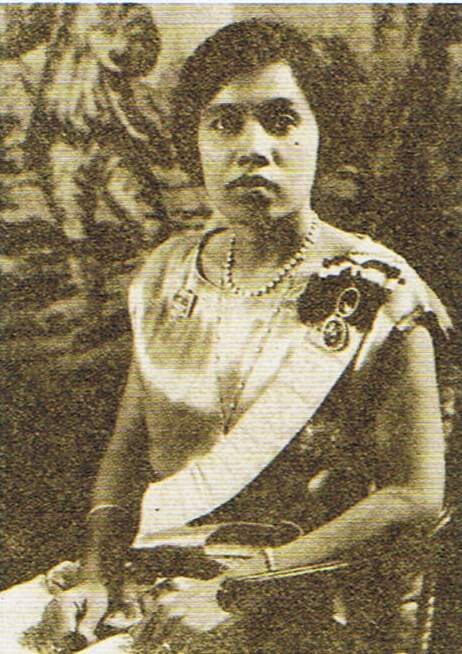
- Born: 28 August 1884; Grand Palace; Bangkok, Siam
- Died: 13 June 1934 (aged 49); Bangkok, Siam
Names
- Her Royal Highness; Princess Yaovabha Bongsanid
- House: Chakri Dynasty
- Father: Chulalongkorn (Rama V)
- Mother: Chao Chom Manda Mom Rajawongse Nueng Sanidvongs

Yaovabha Bongsanid (Thai: เยาวภาพงศ์สนิท; RTGS: Yaowaphaphongsanit; 28 August 1884 – 13 June 1934) was the Princess of Siam (later Thailand). She was a member of Siamese Royal Family. She was a daughter of Chulalongkorn, King Rama V of Siam.

Princess Yaovabha Bongsanid of Siam was born on 28 August 1884 at the Grand Palace. She was the forty-seventh daughter of King Chulalongkorn of Siam (Rama V the Great) and The Noble Consort (Chao Chom Manda) Mom Rajawongse Nueng Sanidvongs (daughter of Prince Sai Sanidvongs. She had a younger brother, Prince Rangsit Prayurasakdi, the Prince of Chainat Narendorn.

When their mother died on 23 November 1885, she and both her younger brother, Prince Rangsit Prayursakdi, were adopted by Queen Savang Vadhana, one of the King Chulalongkorn's queen consorts (who later became the Queen Aunt and Queen Grandmother).

Princess Yaovabha Bongsanid died on 13 June 1934 at the Grand Palace, at the age of 49 years and 11 months.

== Royal Decorations ==
- Dame Cross of the Most Illustrious Order of Chula Chom Klao (First class): received 25 November 1906

== Ancestry ==
Ancestor of Princess Yaovabha Bongsanid
Princess Yaovabha Bongsanid	Father: Chulalongkorn, King Rama V of Siam	Paternal Grandfather: Mongkut, King Rama IV of Siam	Paternal Great-grandfather: Buddha Loetla Nabhalai, King Rama II of Siam
Princess Yaovabha Bongsanid	Father: Chulalongkorn, King Rama V of Siam	Paternal Grandfather: Mongkut, King Rama IV of Siam	Paternal Great-grandmother: Queen Sri Suriyendra
Princess Yaovabha Bongsanid	Father: Chulalongkorn, King Rama V of Siam	Paternal Grandmother: Queen Debsirindra	Paternal Great-grandfather: Prince Sirivongse, the Prince Matayabidaksa
Princess Yaovabha Bongsanid	Father: Chulalongkorn, King Rama V of Siam	Paternal Grandmother: Queen Debsirindra	Paternal Great-grandmother: Mom Noi Sirivongs na Ayudhya
Princess Yaovabha Bongsanid	Mother: Chao Chom Manda Mom Rajawongse Nueng Sanidvongse	Maternal Grandfather: Prince Sai Sanidvongse	Maternal Great-grandfather: Prince Nuam, the Prince Vongsadhirajsanid
Princess Yaovabha Bongsanid	Mother: Chao Chom Manda Mom Rajawongse Nueng Sanidvongse	Maternal Grandfather: Prince Sai Sanidvongse	Maternal Great-grandmother: unknown
Princess Yaovabha Bongsanid	Mother: Chao Chom Manda Mom Rajawongse Nueng Sanidvongse	Maternal Grandmother: Mom Khian Sanidvongse na Ayudhya	Maternal Great-grandfather: unknown
Princess Yaovabha Bongsanid	Mother: Chao Chom Manda Mom Rajawongse Nueng Sanidvongse	Maternal Grandmother: Mom Khian Sanidvongse na Ayudhya	Maternal Great-grandmother: unknown

== See also ==
- Wongsa Dhiraj Snid, her maternal grandfather (and distant cousin), the Royal Doctor
- Vapi Busbakara, her half-sister and later fellow adopted step-sister
