= Suchitra Bharani =

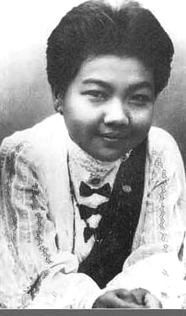
- Born: 6 February 1890; Grand Palace; Bangkok, Siam
- Died: 26 October 1918 (aged 28); Bangkok, Siam
Names
- Suchitra Bharani
- House: Chakri dynasty
- Father: Chulalongkorn (Rama V)
- Mother: Chao Chom Manda Chum Krairoek

Princess Suchitra Bharani (full title: Phra Chao Boromwongse Ther Phra Ong Chao Suchitra Bharani; RTGS: Suchittra Phorani, Thai: พระเจ้าบรมวงศ์เธอ พระองค์เจ้าสุจิตราภรณี; 6 February 1890 – 26 October 1918), was a Princess of Siam (later Thailand) as a member of the Siamese royal family. She was a daughter of Chulalongkorn, King Rama V of Siam.

Her mother was Chao Chom Manda Chum Krairoek, daughter of Lord (Phra) Mangkalaratana Rajamontri. She had an elder sister, Princess Adorn Dibyanibha. She died on 27 October 1918, at the age of only 28 years 8 months, due to a lung disease.

== Ancestry ==
Ancestors of Princess Suchitra Bharani
| Princess Suchitra Bharani | Father: Chulalongkorn, King Rama V of Siam | Paternal Grandfather: Mongkut, King Rama IV of Siam | Paternal Great-grandfather: Buddha Loetla Nabhalai, King Rama II of Siam |
| Princess Suchitra Bharani | Father: Chulalongkorn, King Rama V of Siam | Paternal Grandfather: Mongkut, King Rama IV of Siam | Paternal Great-grandmother: Queen Sri Suriyendra |
| Princess Suchitra Bharani | Father: Chulalongkorn, King Rama V of Siam | Paternal Grandmother: Queen Debsirindra | Paternal Great-grandfather: Prince Sirivongse, the Prince Matayabidaksa |
| Princess Suchitra Bharani | Father: Chulalongkorn, King Rama V of Siam | Paternal Grandmother: Queen Debsirindra | Paternal Great-grandmother: Mom Noi Sirivongs na Ayudhya |
| Princess Suchitra Bharani | Mother: Chao Chom Manda Chum Krairoek | Maternal Grandfather: Phra Mangkalaratana Rajamontri (Chuang Krairoek) | Maternal Great-grandfather: Phraya Choduka Rajaserdhi (Thongchin Krairoek) |
| Princess Suchitra Bharani | Mother: Chao Chom Manda Chum Krairoek | Maternal Grandfather: Phra Mangkalaratana Rajamontri (Chuang Krairoek) | Maternal Great-grandmother: unknown |
| Princess Suchitra Bharani | Mother: Chao Chom Manda Chum Krairoek | Maternal Grandmother: unknown | Maternal Great-grandfather: unknown |
| Princess Suchitra Bharani | Mother: Chao Chom Manda Chum Krairoek | Maternal Grandmother: unknown | Maternal Great-grandmother: unknown |
