= Prabai Bannabilas =

Princess of Siam, daughter of Chulalongkorn

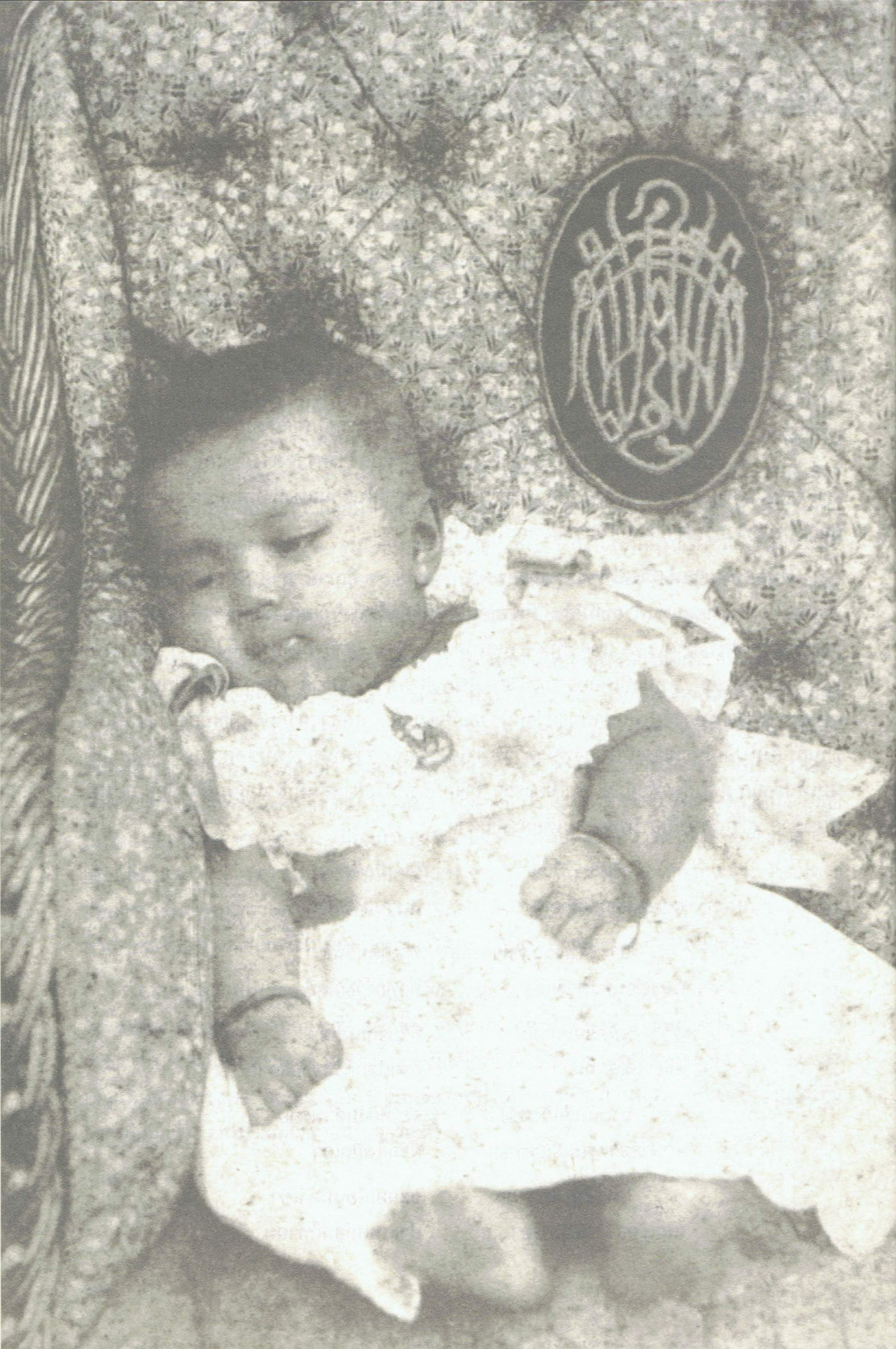
- Born: 13 August 1885; Grand Palace; Bangkok, Siam
- Died: 17 September 1886 (aged 1); Bangkok, Siam
Names
- Prabai Bannabilas
- House: Chakri Dynasty
- Father: Chulalongkorn (Rama V)
- Mother: Chao Chom Manda Phrom

Princess Prabai Bannabilas (Thai: ประไพพรรณพิลาศ; RTGS: Phraphaiphannaphilat; 13 August 1885 – 17 September 1886) was the Princess of Siam (later Thailand). She was a member of the Siamese Royal Family, a daughter of Chulalongkorn, King Rama V of Siam.

Her mother was Chao Chom Manda Phrom (daughter of Phraya Phitsanuloka Thibodi). She had 3 siblings, 1 elder sister, 1 younger brother and 1 younger sister:

- Princess Prabha Bannabilaya (13 August 1885 – 8 September 1948) Princess Prabai Bannabilas' twin elder sister.
- Prince Samaya Vudhirodom (13 September 1888 – 9 December 1889)
- Princess Vapi Busbakara (25 June 1891 – 15 December 1982)

Princess Prabha Bannabilaya and Princess Prabai Bannabilas were the only set of twins of King Chulalongkorn, and they were the fourth set of twins in Chakri Dynasty. The three previous sets of twins were:

- Prince and Princess twin of Prince Boworn Maha Senanurak and Chao Chom Manda Sabaya, they died soon after birth in 1810
- Princess twins of King Buddha Loetla Nabhalai and Chao Chom Manda Nhu Chin, died a week after birth in 1811
- Prince twins of Prince Yodyingyos, the Prince Bowornwichaicharn and Chao Chom Manda Mom Luang Prik Chesdankura, died a year after birth in 1857.

Princess Prabai Bannabilas suffered from a terrible illness and died on 17 September 1886, at the age of 1 year and 1 month. The Royal Crematorium was created in Wat Ratchabophit by her uncle Prince Bhanurangsi Savangwongse, the Prince Bhanubhandhubongse Voradej, and the cremation ceremony was performed by her father, King Chulalongkorn on 29 December 1886.

== Ancestry ==
Ancestor of Princess Prabai Bannabilas
| Princess Prabai Bannabilas | Father: Chulalongkorn, King Rama V of Siam | Paternal Grandfather: Mongkut, King Rama IV of Siam | Paternal Great-grandfather: Buddha Loetla Nabhalai, King Rama II of Siam |
| Princess Prabai Bannabilas | Father: Chulalongkorn, King Rama V of Siam | Paternal Grandfather: Mongkut, King Rama IV of Siam | Paternal Great-grandmother: Queen Sri Suriyendra |
| Princess Prabai Bannabilas | Father: Chulalongkorn, King Rama V of Siam | Paternal Grandmother: Queen Debsirindra | Paternal Great-grandfather: Prince Sirivongse, the Prince Matayabidaksa |
| Princess Prabai Bannabilas | Father: Chulalongkorn, King Rama V of Siam | Paternal Grandmother: Queen Debsirindra | Paternal Great-grandmother: Mom Noi Sirivongs na Ayudhya |
| Princess Prabai Bannabilas | Mother: Chao Chom Manda Phrom | Maternal Grandfather: Phraya Phitsanuloka Thibodi | Maternal Great-grandfather: unknown |
| Princess Prabai Bannabilas | Mother: Chao Chom Manda Phrom | Maternal Grandfather: Phraya Phitsanuloka Thibodi | Maternal Great-grandmother: unknown |
| Princess Prabai Bannabilas | Mother: Chao Chom Manda Phrom | Maternal Grandmother: unknown | Maternal Great-grandfather: unknown |
| Princess Prabai Bannabilas | Mother: Chao Chom Manda Phrom | Maternal Grandmother: unknown | Maternal Great-grandmother: unknown |
