= Prabha Bannabilaya =

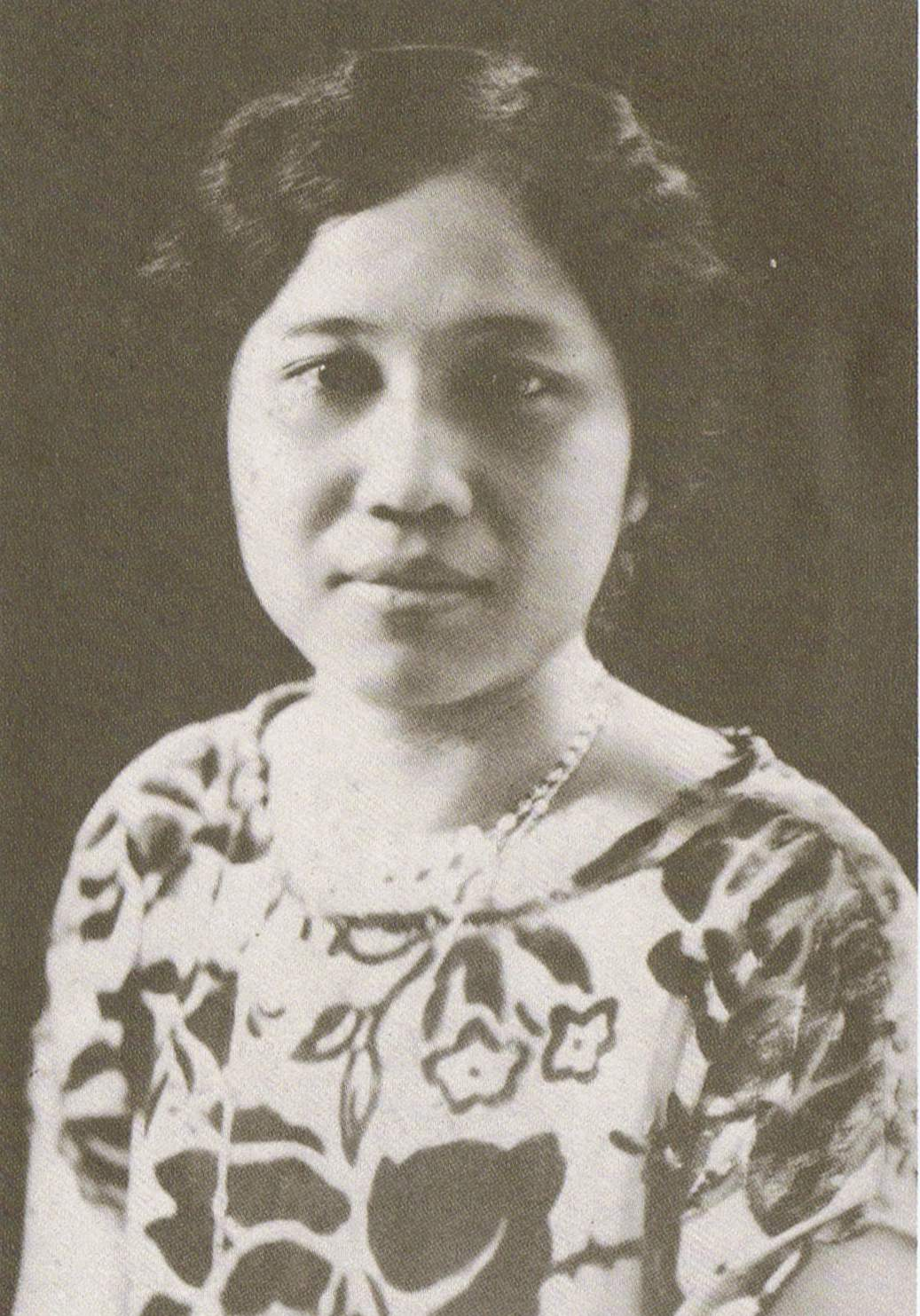
- Born: 13 August 1885; Grand Palace; Bangkok, Siam
- Died: 8 September 1948 (aged 63); Bangkok, Thailand
Names
- Prabha Bannabilaya
- House: Chakri Dynasty
- Father: Chulalongkorn (Rama V)
- Mother: Chao Chom Manda Phrom

Princess Prabha Bannabilaya (Thai: ประภาพรรณพิไลย; RTGS: Praphaphanphilai; 13 August 1885 – 8 September 1948) was the Princess of Siam (later Thailand. She was a member of Siamese Royal Family. She is a daughter of Chulalongkorn, King Rama V of Siam.

Her mother was Chao Chom Manda Phrom (daughter of Phraya Phitsanuloka Thibodi). She had 3 siblings; 1 elder sister, 1 younger brother and 1 younger sister;

- Princess Prabai Bannabilas (13 August 1885 – 17 September 1886) Princess Prabha Bannabilaya' twin younger sister.
- Prince Samaya Vudhirodom (13 September 1888 – 9 December 1889)
- Princess Vapi Busbakara (25 June 1891 – 15 December 1982)

Princess Prabha Bannabilaya and Princess Prabai Bannabilas were the only twin couple of King Chulalongkorn, and they were the 4th twin couple in Chakri Dynasty.

== Death ==
Princess Prabha Bannabilaya died on 8 September 1948, at the age of 63. The Royal Cremation was created on 23 April 1950, in the same crematorium of King Ananda Mahidol's crematorium. The Royal Cremation was performed by King Bhumibol Adulyadej

== Ancestry ==
Ancestor of Princess Prabha Bannabilaya
Princess Prabha Bannabilaya	Father: Chulalongkorn, King Rama V of Siam	Paternal Grandfather: Mongkut, King Rama IV of Siam	Paternal Great-grandfather: Buddha Loetla Nabhalai, King Rama II of Siam
Princess Prabha Bannabilaya	Father: Chulalongkorn, King Rama V of Siam	Paternal Grandfather: Mongkut, King Rama IV of Siam	Paternal Great-grandmother: Queen Sri Suriyendra
Princess Prabha Bannabilaya	Father: Chulalongkorn, King Rama V of Siam	Paternal Grandmother: Queen Debsirindra	Paternal Great-grandfather: Prince Sirivongse, the Prince Matayabidaksa
Princess Prabha Bannabilaya	Father: Chulalongkorn, King Rama V of Siam	Paternal Grandmother: Queen Debsirindra	Paternal Great-grandmother: Mom Noi Sirivongs na Ayudhya
Princess Prabha Bannabilaya	Mother: Chao Chom Manda Phrom	Maternal Grandfather: Phraya Phitsanuloka Thibodi	Maternal Great-grandfather: unknown
Princess Prabha Bannabilaya	Mother: Chao Chom Manda Phrom	Maternal Grandfather: Phraya Phitsanuloka Thibodi	Maternal Great-grandmother: unknown
Princess Prabha Bannabilaya	Mother: Chao Chom Manda Phrom	Maternal Grandmother: unknown	Maternal Great-grandfather: unknown
Princess Prabha Bannabilaya	Mother: Chao Chom Manda Phrom	Maternal Grandmother: unknown	Maternal Great-grandmother: unknown
