= Khajera Chirapradidha =

Prince of Siam, son of Chulalongkorn

- Born: 23 July 1888; Grand Palace; Bangkok, Siam
- Died: 7 October 1888 (aged 0); Bangkok, Siam
Names
- His Royal Highness; Prince Khajera Chirapradidha
- House: Chakri dynasty
- Father: Chulalongkorn (Rama V)
- Mother: Chao Chom Manda Sae Rojanadis

Prince Khajera Chirapradidha or Phra Chao Boromwongse Ther Phra Ong Chao Khajera Chirapradidha (RTGS: Khajen Chirapradit) (Thai: พระเจ้าบรมวงศ์เธอ พระองค์เจ้าเขจรจิรประดิษฐ) (23 July 1888 – 7 October 1888), was the Prince of Siam (later Thailand). He was a member of the Siamese royal family. He was a son of Chulalongkorn, King Rama V of Siam.

His mother was Sae Rojanadis, daughter of Phraya Abbhantrikamas and Bang Rojanadis. He had 2 younger sisters;

- Princess Abbhantripaja (31 October 1889 – 18 February 1934)
- Princess Dibyalangkarn (17 January 1891 – 4 June 1932)

Prince Khajera Chirapradidha died in babyhood on 7 October 1888, at the age of only 3 months.

== Ancestry ==
Ancestor of Prince Khajera Chirapradidha
Prince Khajera Chirapradidha	Father: Chulalongkorn, King Rama V of Siam	Paternal Grandfather: Mongkut, King Rama IV of Siam	Paternal Great-grandfather: Buddha Loetla Nabhalai, King Rama II of Siam
Prince Khajera Chirapradidha	Father: Chulalongkorn, King Rama V of Siam	Paternal Grandfather: Mongkut, King Rama IV of Siam	Paternal Great-grandmother: Queen Sri Suriyendra
Prince Khajera Chirapradidha	Father: Chulalongkorn, King Rama V of Siam	Paternal Grandmother: Queen Debsirindra	Paternal Great-grandfather: Prince Sirivongse, the Prince Matayabidaksa
Prince Khajera Chirapradidha	Father: Chulalongkorn, King Rama V of Siam	Paternal Grandmother: Queen Debsirindra	Paternal Great-grandmother: Mom Noi Sirivongs na Ayudhya
Prince Khajera Chirapradidha	Mother: Chao Chom Manda Sae Rojanadis	Maternal Grandfather: Phraya Abbhantrikamas	Maternal Great-grandfather: unknown
Prince Khajera Chirapradidha	Mother: Chao Chom Manda Sae Rojanadis	Maternal Grandfather: Phraya Abbhantrikamas	Maternal Great-grandmother: unknown
Prince Khajera Chirapradidha	Mother: Chao Chom Manda Sae Rojanadis	Maternal Grandmother: Bang Rojanadis	Maternal Great-grandfather: unknown
Prince Khajera Chirapradidha	Mother: Chao Chom Manda Sae Rojanadis	Maternal Grandmother: Bang Rojanadis	Maternal Great-grandmother: unknown
