= Dibyalangkarn =

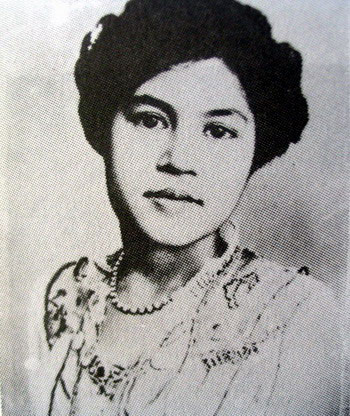
- Born: 17 January 1891; Grand Palace; Bangkok, Siam
- Died: 4 June 1932 (aged 41); Bangkok, Siam
Names
- Dibyalangkarn
- House: Chakri dynasty
- Father: Chulalongkorn (Rama V)
- Mother: Chao Chom Manda Sae Rojanadis

Princess Dibyalangkarn or Phra Chao Boromwongse Ther Phra Ong Chao Dibyalangkarn (RTGS: Thipphayalangkan) (Thai: พระเจ้าบรมวงศ์เธอ พระองค์เจ้าทิพยาลังการ) (17 January 1891 – 4 June 1932), was a Princess of Siam (later Thailand). She was a member of the Siamese royal family. She is a daughter of Chulalongkorn, King Rama V of Siam.

Her mother was The Noble Consort (Chao Chom Manda) Sae Rojanadis, daughter of Phraya Abbhantrikamas and Bang Rojanadis. She had 2 full siblings; an elder brother and an elder sister;

- Prince Khajera Chirapradidha (23 July 1888 – 7 October 1888)
- Princess Abbhantripaja (31 October 1889 – 18 February 1934)

Princess Dibyalangkarn died on 4 June 1932, at the age of only 41.

== Ancestry ==
Ancestor of Princess Dibyalangkarn
Princess Dibyalangkarn	Father: Chulalongkorn, King Rama V of Siam	Paternal Grandfather: Mongkut, King Rama IV of Siam	Paternal Great-grandfather: Buddha Loetla Nabhalai, King Rama II of Siam
Princess Dibyalangkarn	Father: Chulalongkorn, King Rama V of Siam	Paternal Grandfather: Mongkut, King Rama IV of Siam	Paternal Great-grandmother: Queen Sri Suriyendra
Princess Dibyalangkarn	Father: Chulalongkorn, King Rama V of Siam	Paternal Grandmother: Queen Debsirindra	Paternal Great-grandfather: Prince Sirivongse, the Prince Matayabidaksa
Princess Dibyalangkarn	Father: Chulalongkorn, King Rama V of Siam	Paternal Grandmother: Queen Debsirindra	Paternal Great-grandmother: Mom Noi Sirivongs na Ayudhya
Princess Dibyalangkarn	Mother: Chao Chom Manda Sae Rojanadis	Maternal Grandfather: Phraya Abbhantrikamas	Maternal Great-grandfather: unknown
Princess Dibyalangkarn	Mother: Chao Chom Manda Sae Rojanadis	Maternal Grandfather: Phraya Abbhantrikamas	Maternal Great-grandmother: unknown
Princess Dibyalangkarn	Mother: Chao Chom Manda Sae Rojanadis	Maternal Grandmother: Bang Rojanadis	Maternal Great-grandfather: unknown
Princess Dibyalangkarn	Mother: Chao Chom Manda Sae Rojanadis	Maternal Grandmother: Bang Rojanadis	Maternal Great-grandmother: unknown
