= Adorn Dibyanibha =

Princess of Siam

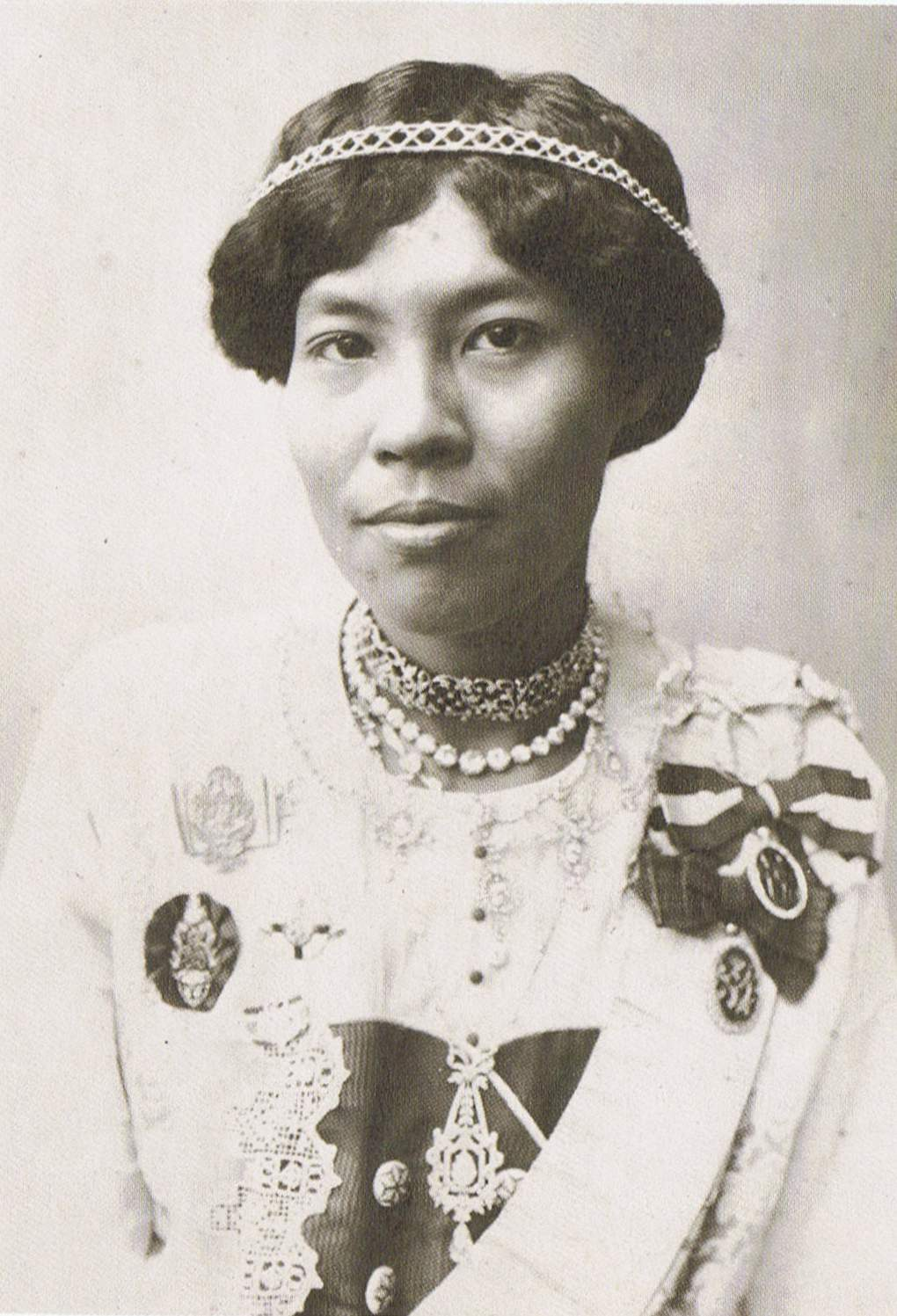
- Born: 21 April 1889; Grand Palace; Bangkok, Siam
- Died: 23 March 1958 (aged 68); Bangkok, Thailand
- Adorn Dibyanibha
- House: Chakri dynasty
- Father: Chulalongkorn (Rama V)
- Mother: Chao Chom Manda Chum Krairoek

Princess Adorn Dibyanibha or Phra Chao Boromwongse Ther Phra Ong Chao Adorn Dibyanibha (RTGS: Athon Thiphayanipha) (Thai: พระเจ้าบรมวงศ์เธอ พระองค์เจ้าอาทรทิพยนิภา, 21 April 1889 – 23 March 1958) was a Princess of Siam. She was a member of the Siamese royal family, and the daughter of Chulalongkorn, King Rama V of Siam and the great-aunt of the longest reigning Thai monarch Bhumibol Adulyadej.

Her mother was Chao Chom Manda Chum Krairoek, daughter of Lord (Phra) Mangkalaratana Rajamontri. She had a younger sister, Princess Suchitra Bharani. She died on 23 March 1958, at the age of 68.

== Royal decorations ==
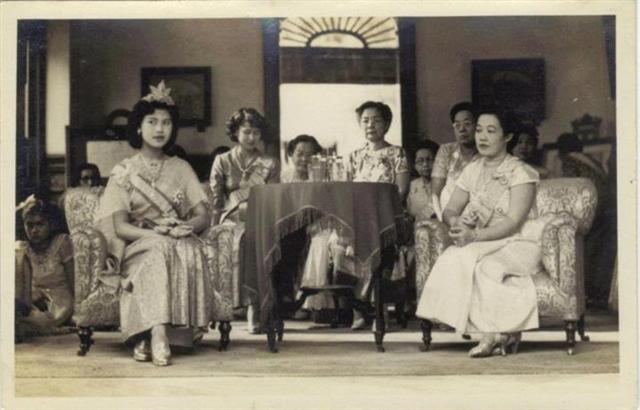
Queen Sirikit (Far left), Princess Galyani Vadhana (center), Princess Hemvadi, Princess Adisaya Suriyabha, Princess Adorn Dibyanibha and Queen Rambhai Barni (right) in 1950

- Dame of The Most Illustrious Order of the Royal House of Chakri: received 9 May 1950
- Dame Cross of the Most Illustrious Order of Chula Chom Klao (First class): received 2 May 1950

== Ancestry ==
Ancestors of Princess Adorn Dibyanibha
Princess Adorndibyanibha	Father: Chulalongkorn, King Rama V of Siam	Paternal Grandfather: Mongkut, King Rama IV of Siam	Paternal Great-grandfather: Buddha Loetla Nabhalai, King Rama II of Siam
Princess Adorndibyanibha	Father: Chulalongkorn, King Rama V of Siam	Paternal Grandfather: Mongkut, King Rama IV of Siam	Paternal Great-grandmother: Queen Sri Suriyendra
Princess Adorndibyanibha	Father: Chulalongkorn, King Rama V of Siam	Paternal Grandmother: Queen Debsirindra	Paternal Great-grandfather: Prince Sirivongse, the Prince Matayabidaksa
Princess Adorndibyanibha	Father: Chulalongkorn, King Rama V of Siam	Paternal Grandmother: Queen Debsirindra	Paternal Great-grandmother: Mom Noi Sirivongs na Ayudhya
Princess Adorndibyanibha	Mother: Chao Chom Manda Chum Krairoek	Maternal Grandfather: Phra Mangkalaratana Rajamontri (Chuang Krairoek)	Maternal Great-grandfather: Phraya Choduka Rajaserdhi (Thongchin Krairoek)
Princess Adorndibyanibha	Mother: Chao Chom Manda Chum Krairoek	Maternal Grandfather: Phra Mangkalaratana Rajamontri (Chuang Krairoek)	Maternal Great-grandmother: unknown
Princess Adorndibyanibha	Mother: Chao Chom Manda Chum Krairoek	Maternal Grandmother: unknown	Maternal Great-grandfather: unknown
Princess Adorndibyanibha	Mother: Chao Chom Manda Chum Krairoek	Maternal Grandmother: unknown	Maternal Great-grandmother: unknown
