= Chum Krairoek =

Daughter of Phraya Mongkolrat Rajamontri and Khai Krairoek

- Royal noble consort of Siam
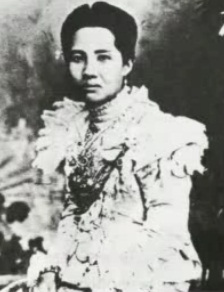
- Chao Chom Manda Chum Krairoek
- Born: 19 September 1869; Bangkok, Siam
- Died: 22 June 1911 (aged 41); Bangkok, Siam
- Spouse: Chulalongkorn (Rama V)
- Issue: Princess Adorn Dibyanibha; Princess Suchitra Bharani
- Father: Chuang Krairoek
- Mother: Khai Krairoek

Chum Krairoek (complete title Chao Chom Manda Chum Krairoek Royal Highness Consort of King Chulalongkorn (Rama V) of Siam (Thai: เจ้าจอมมารดาชุ่ม ไกรฤกษ์) was a royal consort of Chulalongkorn, and daughter of Phra Mongkol Rattanarajmontri (Chuang Krairiksh); also the first woman in the Thai royal court to be appointed as Lady-in-waiting.

She moved to the Grand Palace to be a royal consort of King Chulalongkorn with the royal title Chao Chom Manda (Royal High Consort)

She had 2 children with King Chulalongkorn;

1. Princess Adorn Dibyanibha
2. Princess Suchitra Bharani
