= Vapi Busbakara =

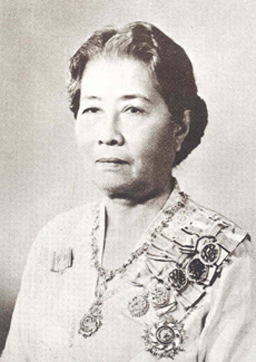
- Born: 25 June 1891; Grand Palace; Bangkok, Siam
- Died: 15 December 1982 (aged 91); Bangkok, Thailand
Names
- Her Royal Highness Princess Vapi Busbakara
- House: Chakri Dynasty
- Father: Chulalongkorn (Rama V)
- Mother: Chao Chom Manda Phrom
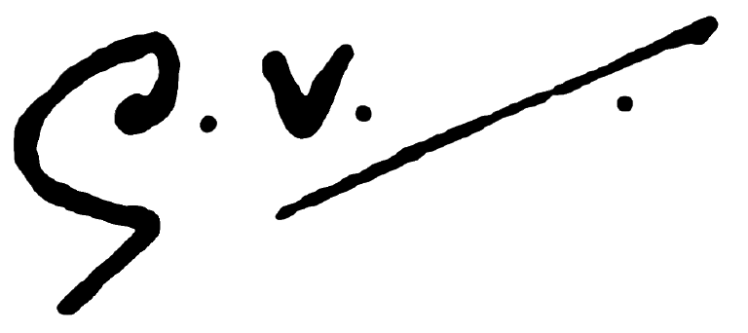
- Signature

Vapi Busbakara (Thai: วาปีบุษบากร; RTGS: Wapibutsabakon; 25 June 1891 – 15 December 1982) was the Princess of Siam (later Thailand). She was a member of Siamese Royal Family. She was a daughter of King Chulalongkorn (Rama V) and adoptive daughter of Queen Sri Savarindira. She was one of the longest-living personages in Thai history, behind three children of King Mongkut (Rama IV); Princess Nabhabhorn Prabha, who died at the age of 94 in 1958, Princess Praditha Sari, who died in 1962 at the age of 96, and Prince Krida Bhinihan, who died at the age of 97 in 1952.

Her mother was Chao Chom Manda Phrom (daughter of Phraya Phitsanuloka Thibodi), but her mother died while she was very young. Later, Queen Savang Vadhana took her in as her adopted daughter, along with her elder sister, Princess Prabha Bannabilaya, including also her full siblings Princess Yaovabha Bongsanid, and Prince Rangsit Prayurasakdi.

She built a house near the monastery where her stepmother, Chao Chon Sadap, lived.

She had 3 full siblings, 2 elder sisters and 1 elder brother:

- Princess Prabha Bannabilaya (13 August 1885 – 8 September 1948)
- Princess Prabai Bannapilas (13 August 1885 – 17 September 1886) Princess Prabha Bannabilaya's twin sister.
- Prince Samaya Vudhirodom (13 September 1888 – 9 December 1889)

Princess Vapi Busbakara was the only adopted daughter of Queen Sri Savarindira, who managed and took care of her stepmother's body at death, before traditional Buddhist Royal Cremation was observed. She died on 15 December 1982, at the age of 91. Royal crematorium was done on 26 March 1983, by King Bhumibol Adulyadej.

== Royal Decorations ==
- Dame of The Most Illustrious Order of the Royal House of Chakri: received 9 May 1950
- Dame Cross of the Most Illustrious Order of Chula Chom Klao (First class): received 2 May 1950
- Dame Grand Cordon of the Most Exalted Order of the White Elephant
- Dame Grand Cordon of the Most Noble Order of the Crown of Thailand
- Dame Cross of the Vallabhabhorn Order
- King Rama V's Royal Cypher Medal (Second Class)
- King Rama VI's Royal Cypher Medal (Second Class)
- King Rama VII's Royal Cypher Medal (First Class)
- King Rama VIII's Royal Cypher Medal (First Class)
- King Rama IX's Royal Cypher Medal (First Class)

== Ancestry ==
Ancestors of Princess Vapi Busbakara
Princess Vapi Busbakara	Father: Chulalongkorn, King Rama V of Siam	Paternal Grandfather: Mongkut, King Rama IV of Siam	Paternal Great-grandfather: Buddha Loetla Nabhalai, King Rama II of Siam
Princess Vapi Busbakara	Father: Chulalongkorn, King Rama V of Siam	Paternal Grandfather: Mongkut, King Rama IV of Siam	Paternal Great-grandmother: Queen Sri Suriyendra
Princess Vapi Busbakara	Father: Chulalongkorn, King Rama V of Siam	Paternal Grandmother: Queen Debsirindra	Paternal Great-grandfather: Prince Sirivongse, the Prince Matayabidaksa
Princess Vapi Busbakara	Father: Chulalongkorn, King Rama V of Siam	Paternal Grandmother: Queen Debsirindra	Paternal Great-grandmother: Mom Noi Sirivongs na Ayudhya
Princess Vapi Busbakara	Mother: Chao Chom Manda Phrom	Maternal Grandfather: Phraya Phitsanuloka Thibodi	Maternal Great-grandfather: unknown
Princess Vapi Busbakara	Mother: Chao Chom Manda Phrom	Maternal Grandfather: Phraya Phitsanuloka Thibodi	Maternal Great-grandmother: unknown
Princess Vapi Busbakara	Mother: Chao Chom Manda Phrom	Maternal Grandmother: unknown	Maternal Great-grandfather: unknown
Princess Vapi Busbakara	Mother: Chao Chom Manda Phrom	Maternal Grandmother: unknown	Maternal Great-grandmother: unknown

Vapi Busbakara Chakri dynasty Born: 25 June 1891 Died: 15 December 1982
Order of precedence
Preceded by Princess Adisaya Suriyabha	Eldest Royal Member of the Chakri Dynasty; 1963–1982	Succeeded by Princess Srinagarindra
