= Samaya Vudhirodom =

Prince of Siam, son of Chulalongkorn

- Born: 13 September 1888; Grand Palace; Bangkok, Siam
- Died: 9 December 1889 (aged 1); Bangkok, Siam
Names
- Samaya Vudhirodom
- House: Chakri dynasty
- Father: Chulalongkorn (Rama V)
- Mother: Chao Chom Manda Phrom

Prince Samaya Vudhirodom (Thai: พระเจ้าบรมวงศ์เธอ พระองค์เจ้าสมัยวุฒิโรดม; RTGS: Samaiyawutthirodom; 13 September 1888 – 9 December 1889), was a Prince of Siam (later Thailand) and a member of the Siamese royal family. He was a son of Chulalongkorn, King Rama V of Siam.

Her mother was Chao Chom Manda Phrom (daughter of Phraya Phitsanuloka Thibodi), he had 3 siblings; 2 elder sisters, and 1 younger sister:

- Princess Prabha Bannabilaya (13 August 1885 – 8 September 1948)
- Princess Prabai Bannapilas (13 August 1885 – 17 September 1886), twin sister of Princess Prabha Bannabilaya.
- Princess Vapi Busbakara (25 June 1891 – 15 December 1982)

Prince Samaya Vudhirodom died at the age of 1 on 9 December 1889,.

== Ancestry ==
Ancestor of Prince Samaya Vudhirodom
Prince Samaya Vudhirodom	Father: Chulalongkorn, King Rama V of Siam	Paternal Grandfather: Mongkut, King Rama IV of Siam	Paternal Great-grandfather: Buddha Loetla Nabhalai, King Rama II of Siam
Prince Samaya Vudhirodom	Father: Chulalongkorn, King Rama V of Siam	Paternal Grandfather: Mongkut, King Rama IV of Siam	Paternal Great-grandmother: Queen Sri Suriyendra
Prince Samaya Vudhirodom	Father: Chulalongkorn, King Rama V of Siam	Paternal Grandmother: Queen Debsirindra	Paternal Great-grandfather: Prince Sirivongse, the Prince Matayabidaksa
Prince Samaya Vudhirodom	Father: Chulalongkorn, King Rama V of Siam	Paternal Grandmother: Queen Debsirindra	Paternal Great-grandmother: Mom Noi Sirivongs na Ayudhya
Prince Samaya Vudhirodom	Mother: Chao Chom Manda Phrom	Maternal Grandfather: Phraya Phitsanuloka Thibodi	Maternal Great-grandfather: unknown
Prince Samaya Vudhirodom	Mother: Chao Chom Manda Phrom	Maternal Grandfather: Phraya Phitsanuloka Thibodi	Maternal Great-grandmother: unknown
Prince Samaya Vudhirodom	Mother: Chao Chom Manda Phrom	Maternal Grandmother: unknown	Maternal Great-grandfather: unknown
Prince Samaya Vudhirodom	Mother: Chao Chom Manda Phrom	Maternal Grandmother: unknown	Maternal Great-grandmother: unknown
