= Sae Rojanadis =

Thai royal consort

- Royal Highness Consort of Siam
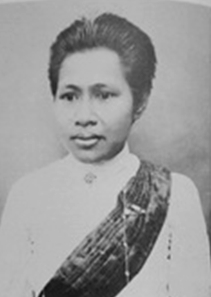
- Full name: Chao Chom Manda Sae Rojanadis; Thai: เจ้าจอมมารดาแส โรจนดิศ
- Born: September 1868; Bangkok, Siam
- Died: 14 October 1925 (aged 57); Bangkok, Siam
- Spouse: Chulalongkorn (Rama V)
- Issue: Prince Khajera Chirapradidha; Princess Abbhantripaja; Princess Dibyalangkarn
- Father: Dis Rojanadis
- Mother: Bang Rojanadis

Sae Rojanadis (September 1868 – 14 October 1925), complete title Chao Chom Manda Sae, Thai: เจ้าจอมมารดาแส , was the Royal Highness Consort of King Chulalongkorn and daughter of Phraya Abbhantrikamat (Dis Rojanadis) and Bang Rojanadis.

She moved to the Grand Palace to be a royal consort of King Chulalongkorn.

She had 3 children with King Chulalongkorn, Prince Khajera Chirapradidha, Princess Abbhantripaja and Princess Dibyalangkarn.
