= Order of the Crown of Thailand =

Thai honour for services to the Kingdom

The Most Noble Order of the Crown of Thailand เครื่องราชอิสริยาภรณ์อันมีเกียรติยศยิ่งมงกุฎไทย
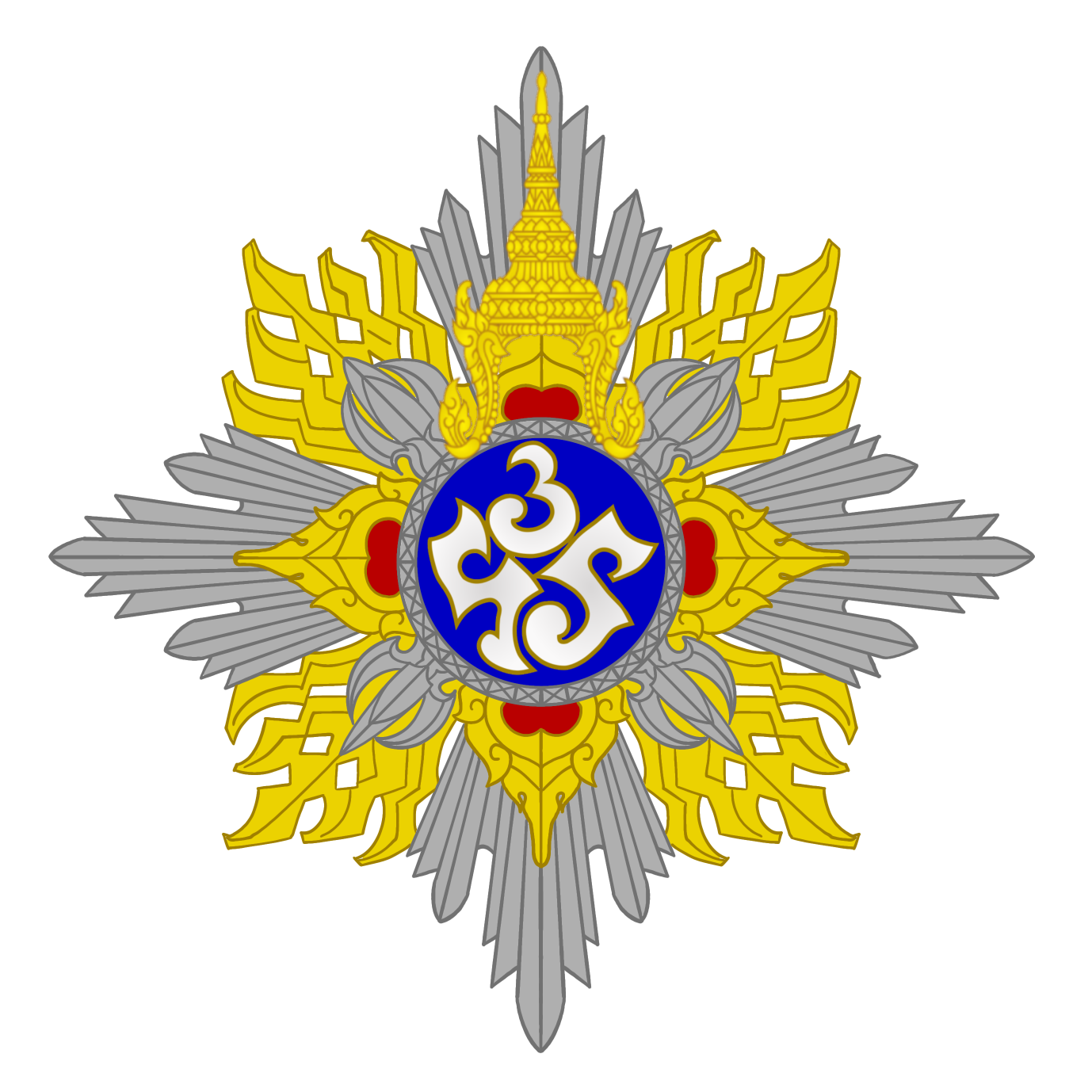

Awarded by the King of Thailand
- Type: Military and Civilian Order
- Established: 1869
- Eligibility: Military, Civilians, Foreign diplomats
- Status: Currently constituted
- Founder: King Chulalongkorn
- Sovereign: King Vajiralongkorn
- Grades: Knight/Dame Grand Cordon, Special Class; Knight/Dame Grand Cordon; Knight/Dame Grand Officer; Knight/Dame Commander; Knight/Dame Officer; Knight/Dame; Gold Medal; Silver Medal
- Former grades: 4 until 1902, 6 until 1918

Statistics
- First induction: 1869
- Last induction: 23 March 2023

Precedence
- Next (higher): Order of the White Elephant
- Next (lower): Order of the Direkgunabhorn
- Ribbon bar of the Knight Grand Cordon (Special Class) Order of the Crown of Thailand

The Most Noble Order of the Crown of Thailand (Thai: เครื่องราชอิสริยาภรณ์อันมีเกียรติยศยิ่งมงกุฎไทย; RTGS: Khrueang Ratcha-itsariyaphon An Mi Kiattiyot Ying Mongkut Thai) is a Thai order, established in 1869 by King Rama V of The Kingdom of Siam (now Thailand) for Thais, the royal family, governmental employees, and foreign dignitaries for their outstanding services to the Kingdom of Thailand. The order originally had seven classes. The special class was added by King Rama VI in 1918. Formerly called The Most Noble Order of the Crown of Siam.

== Classes ==
The Order consists of eight classes:

Ribbon	Star	Class	Name	Postnominals	Old name	Date	Order of precedence
		Knight Grand Cordon (Special Class)	มหาวชิรมงกุฎ (Maha Vajira Mongkut)	MVM (KGCT)	-	30 December 1918	9
		Knight Grand Cross (First Class)	ประถมาภรณ์มงกุฎไทย (Prathamabhorn Mongkut Thai)	PM (GCCT)	มหาสุราภรณ์ (Maha Surabhorn)	1869	11
		Knight Commander (Second Class)	ทวีติยาภรณ์มงกุฎไทย (Dvitiyabhorn Mongkut Thai)	DM (KCT)	จุลสุราภรณ์ (Chulasurabhorn)	1869	16
		Commander (Third Class)	ตริตาภรณ์มงกุฎไทย (Tritabhorn Mongkut Thai)	TM (CCT)	มัณฑนาภรณ์ (Mandanabhorn)	1869	24
		Companion (Fourth Class)	จัตุรถาภรณ์มงกุฎไทย (Chatturathaphon Mongkut Thai)	ChM (OCT)	ภัทราภรณ์ (Bhadrabhorn)	1869	29
		Member (Fifth Class)	เบญจมาภรณ์มงกุฎไทย (Benchamaphon Mongkut Thai)	BM (MCT)	วิจิตราภรณ์ (Vichitrabhorn)	1869	34
		Gold Medalist (Sixth Class)	เหรียญทองมงกุฎไทย (Rian Thong Mongkut Thai)	RThM (GMCT)	-	20 July 1902	53
		Silver Medalist (Seventh Class)	เหรียญเงินมงกุฎไทย (Rian Ngoen Mongkut Thai)	RNgM (SMCT)	-	20 July 1902	56

== Gallery ==
=== Old designs ===
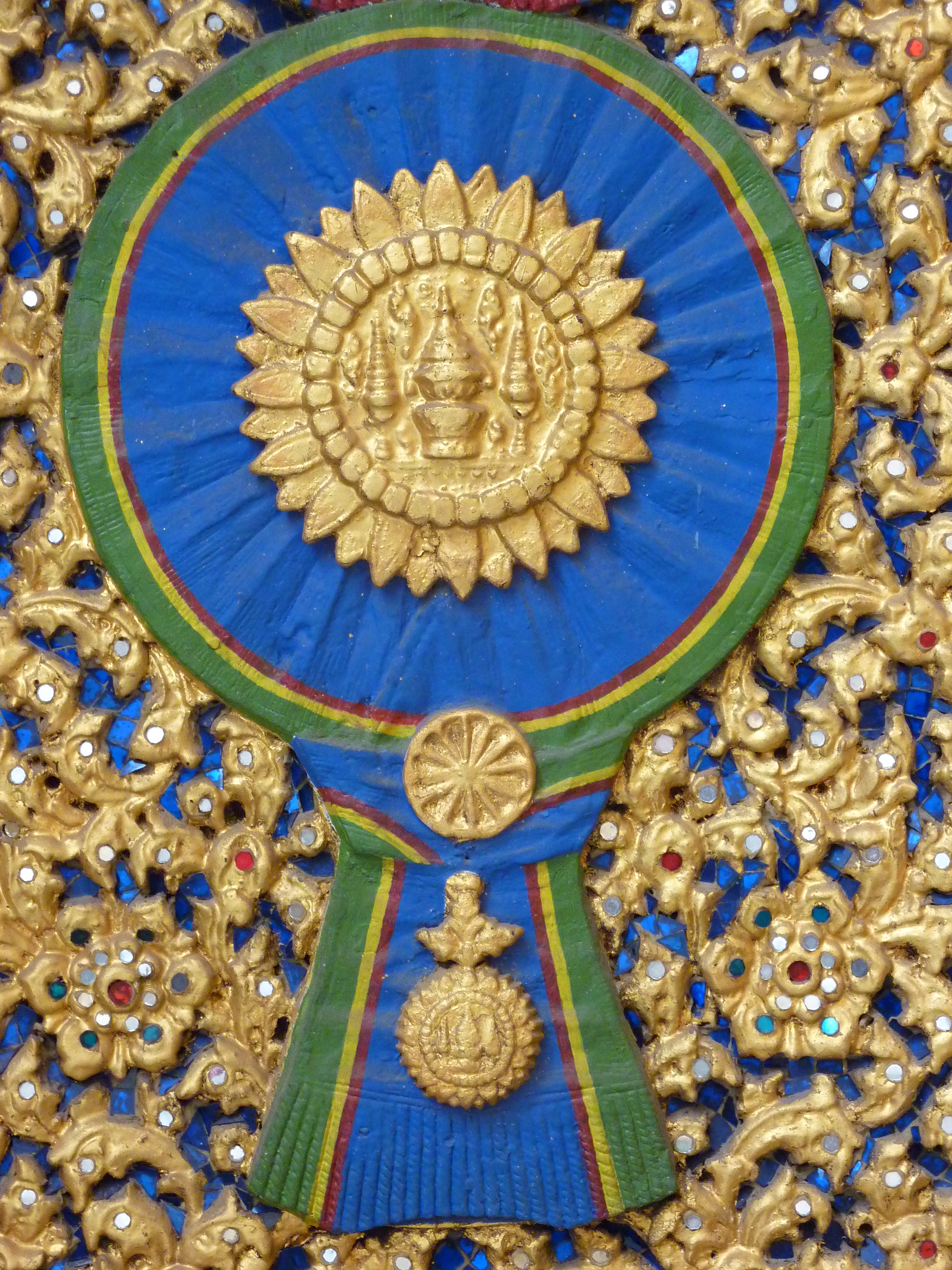
A woodcarving of "Maha Surabhorn", the Knight Grand Cross (First Class) of the Order of the Crown of Siam, version that was used from 1869 to 1909, at the gates of Phra Vihara of Wat Ratchabophit Sathit Maha Simaram, Bangkok.

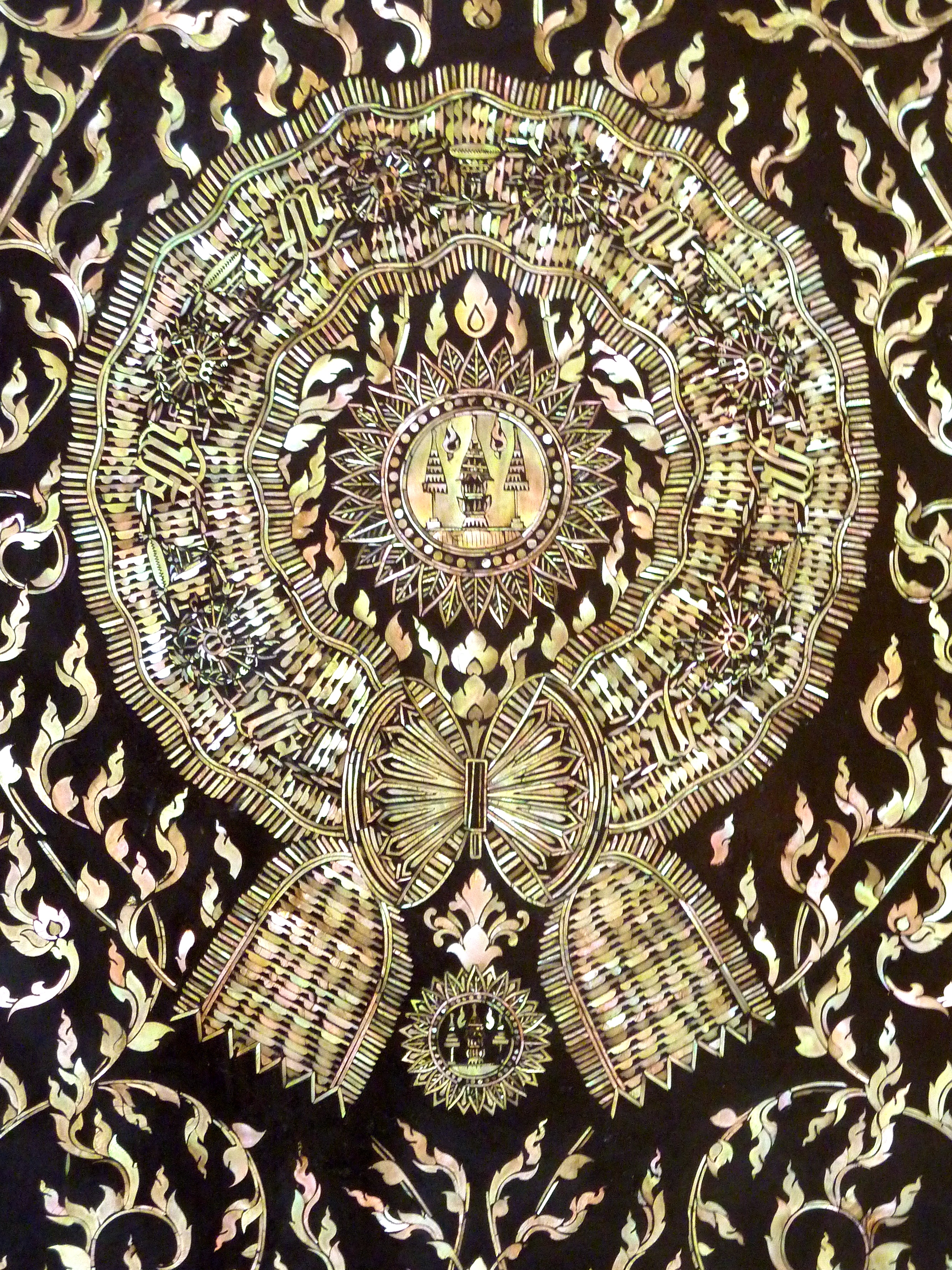
A mother-of-pearl inlay of "Maha Surabhorn", the Knight Grand Cross (First Class) of the Order of the Crown of Siam, version that was used from 1869 to 1909, at the gates of Phra Uposatha of Wat Ratchabophit Sathit Maha Simaram, Bangkok.

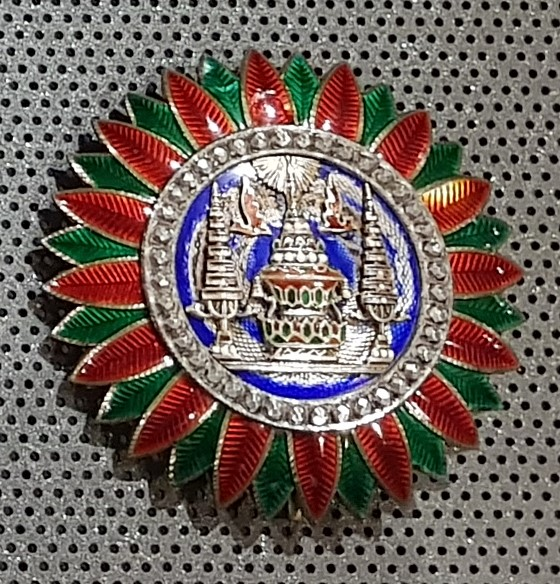
Star of the Knight Grand Cross (1st Class) and the Knight Commander (2nd Class) of Order of the Crown of Thailand (design before 1909)

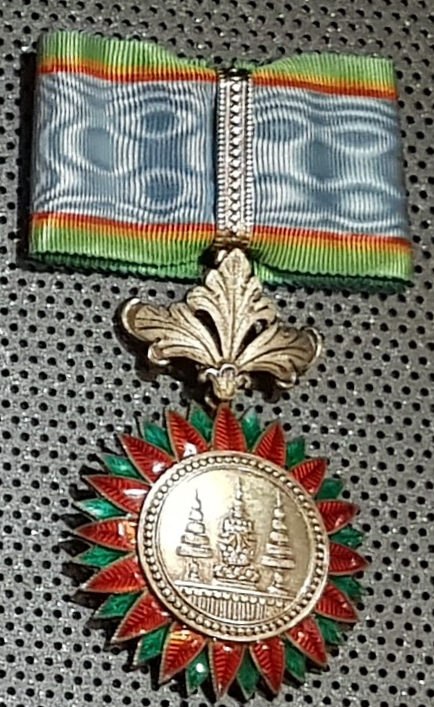
Badge of the Knight Commander (2nd Class) and the Commander (3rd Class) of Order of the Crown of Thailand (design before 1909)

=== Current designs ===
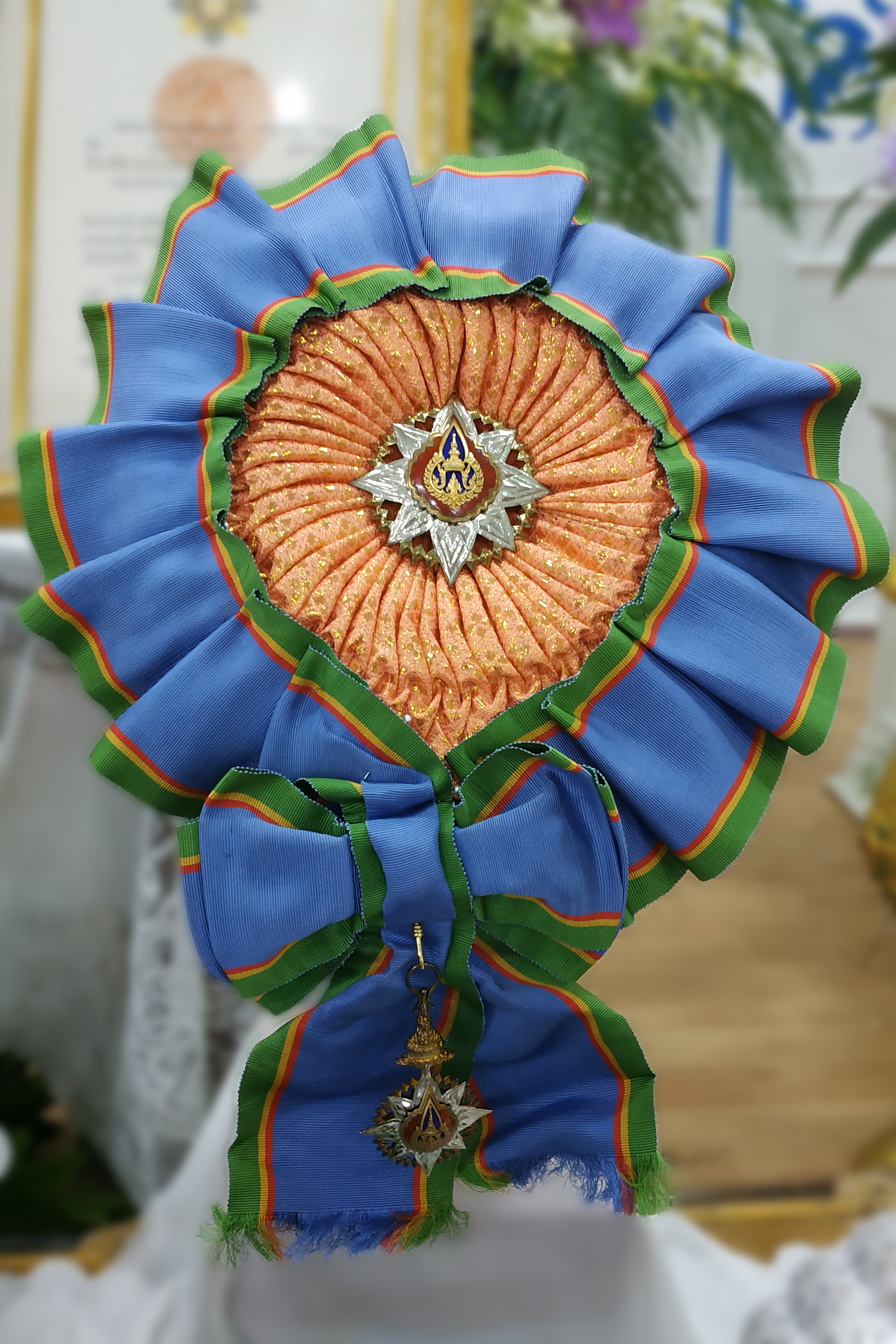
Knight Grand Cross (1st Class) of Order of the Crown of Thailand

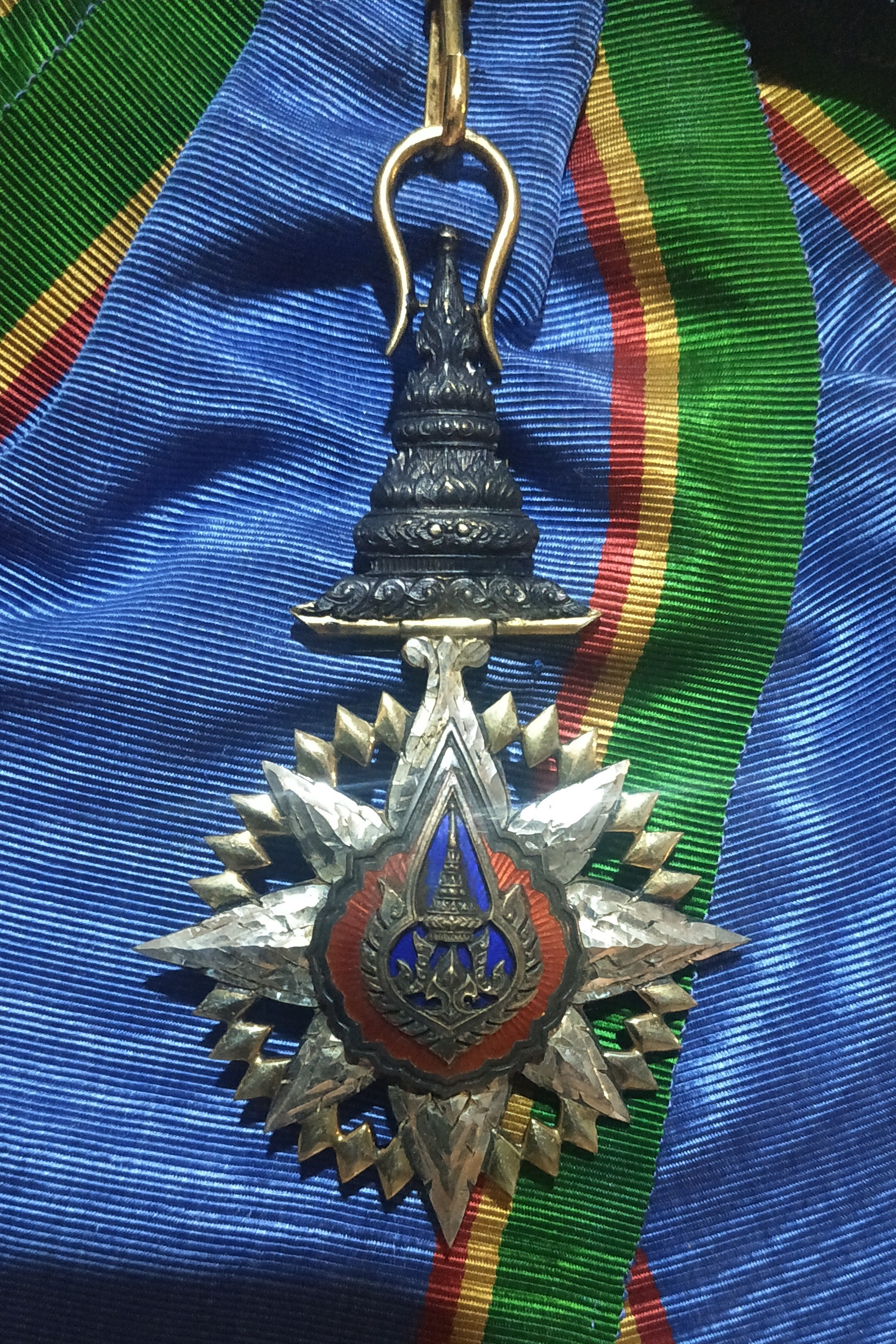
Badge of the Knight Grand Cross (1st Class) of Order of the Crown of Thailand (obverse)

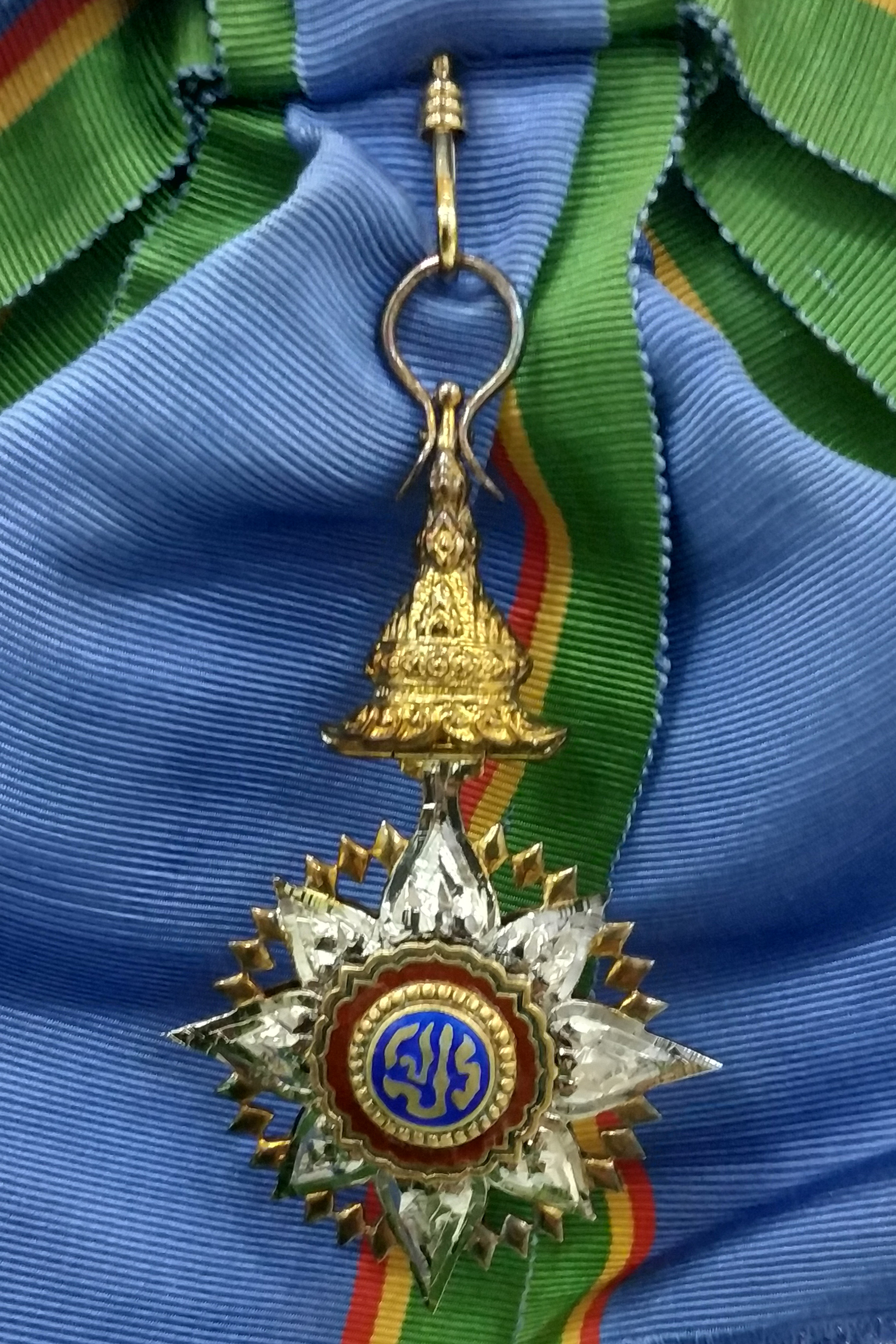
Badge of the Knight Grand Cross (1st Class) of Order of the Crown of Thailand (reverse)

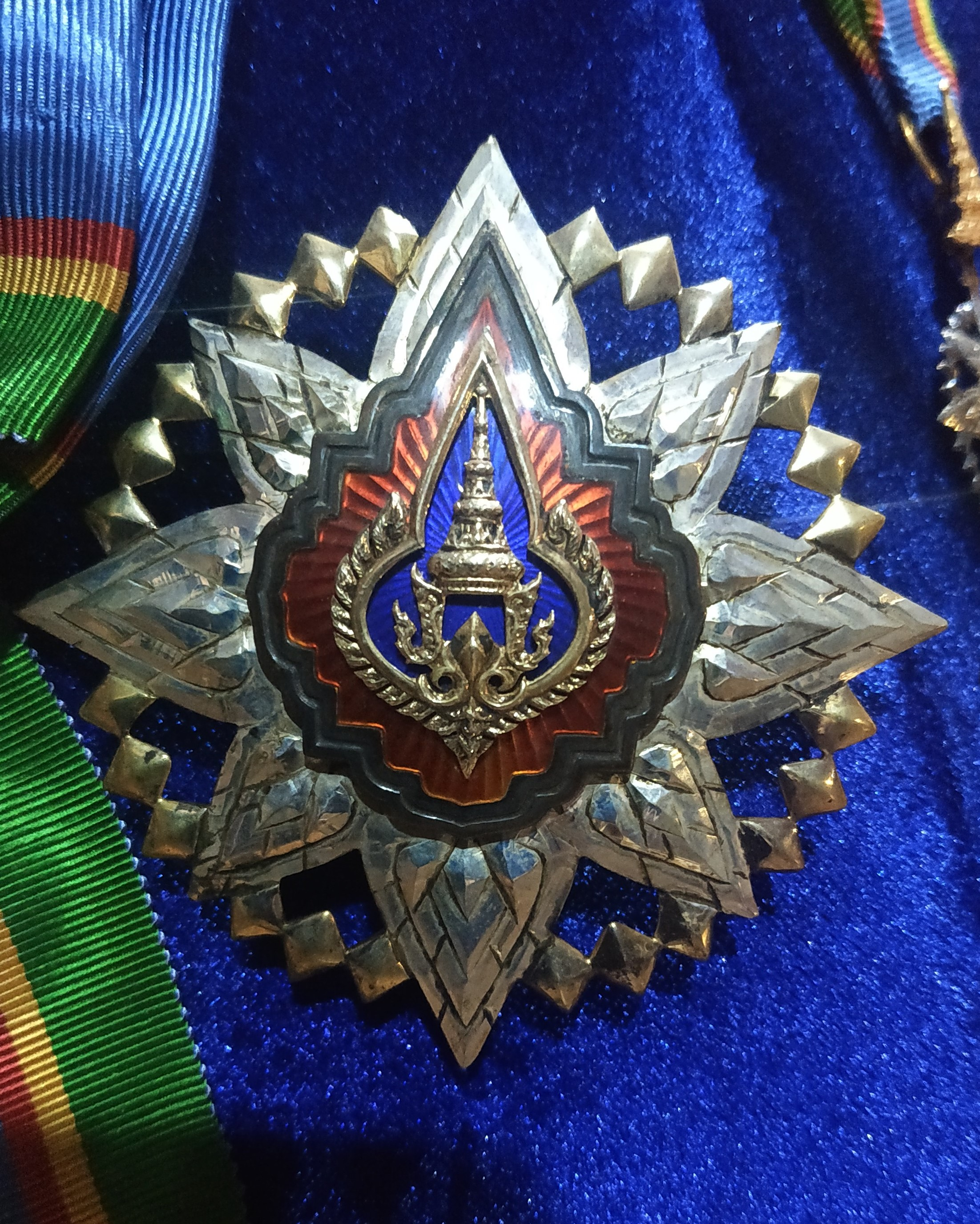
Star of the Knight Grand Cross (1st Class) and the Knight Commander (2nd Class) of Order of the Crown of Thailand

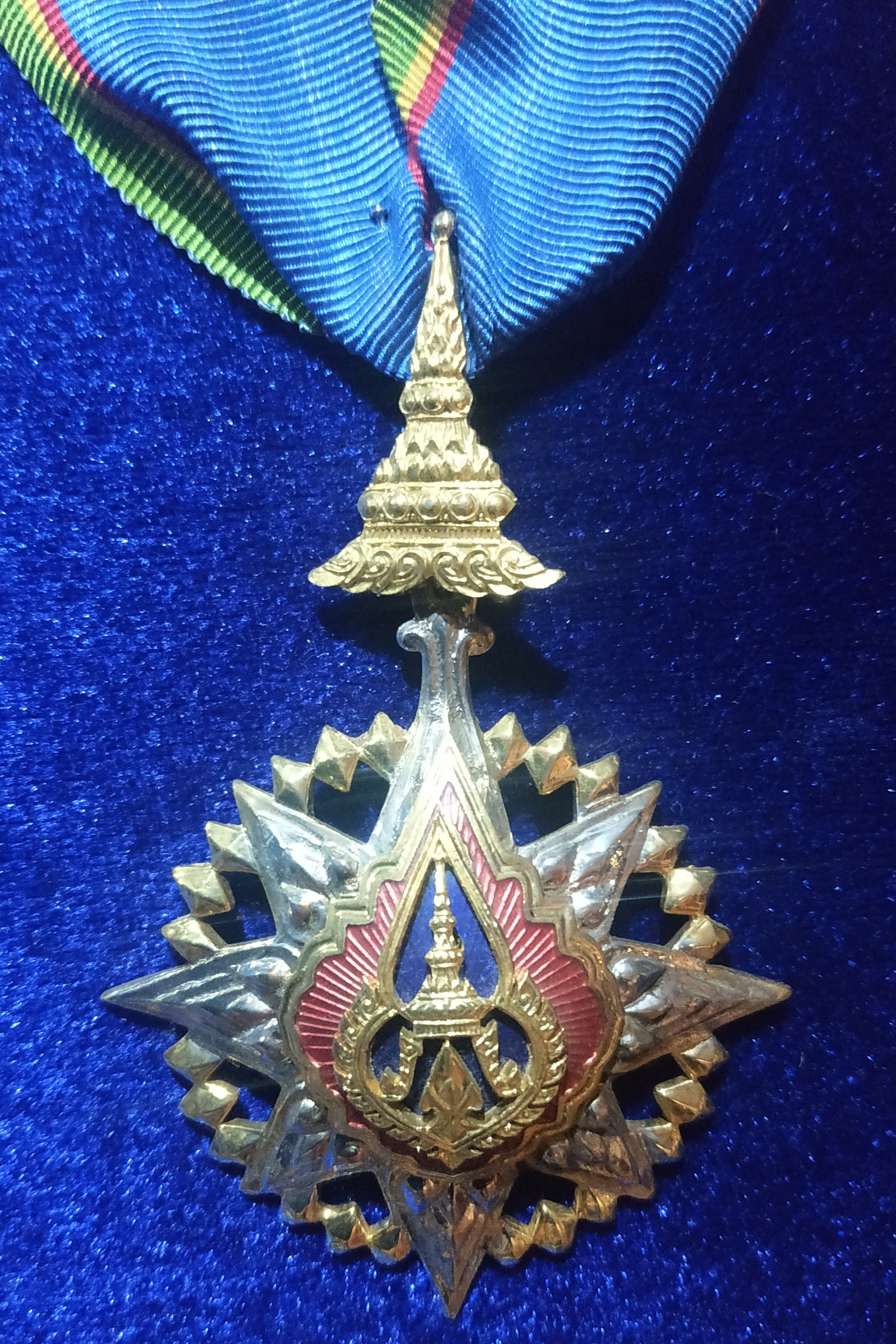
Badge of the Knight Commander (2nd Class) and the Commander (3rd Class) of Order of the Crown of Thailand

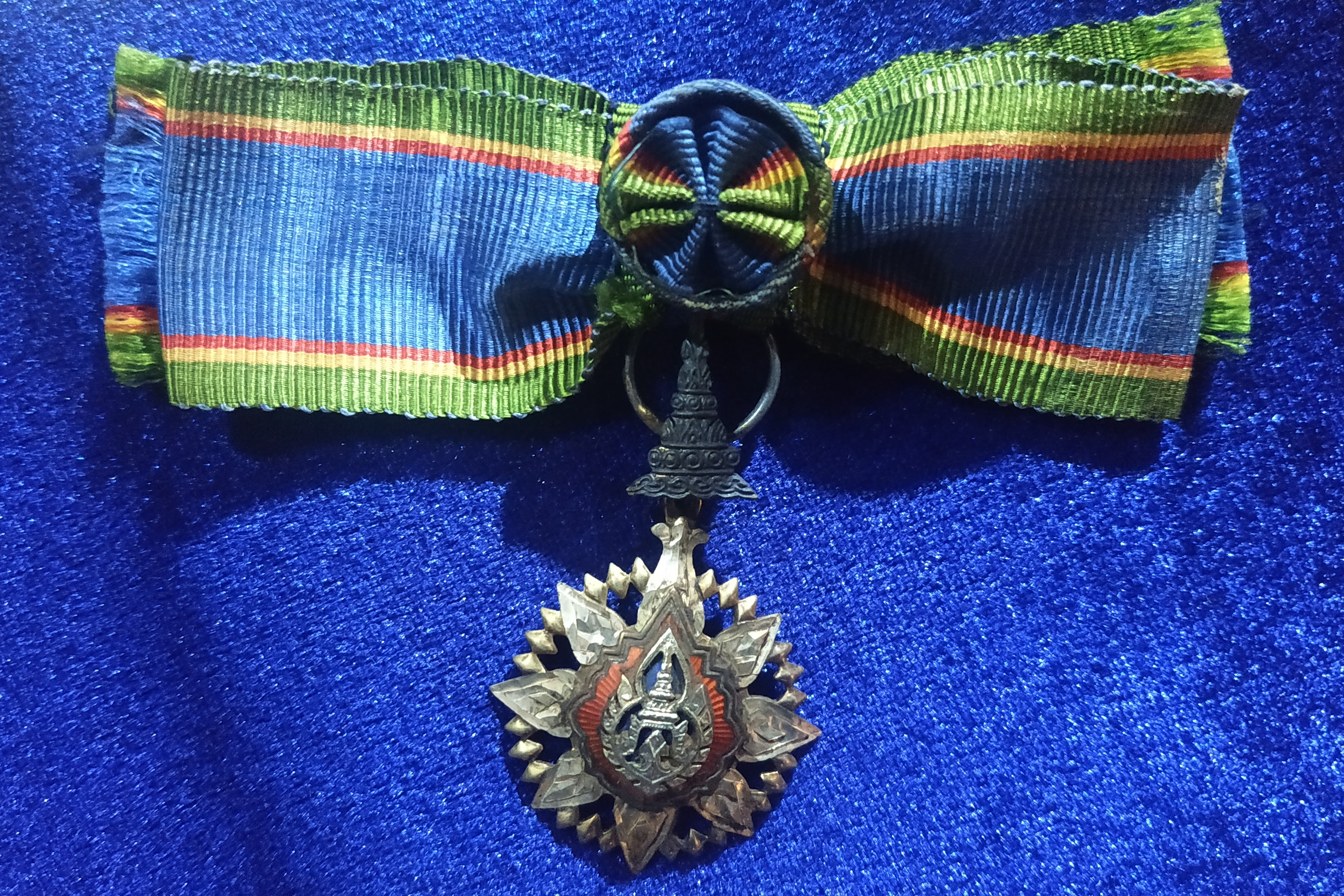
Badge of the Companion (4th Class) of Order of the Crown of Thailand, female version

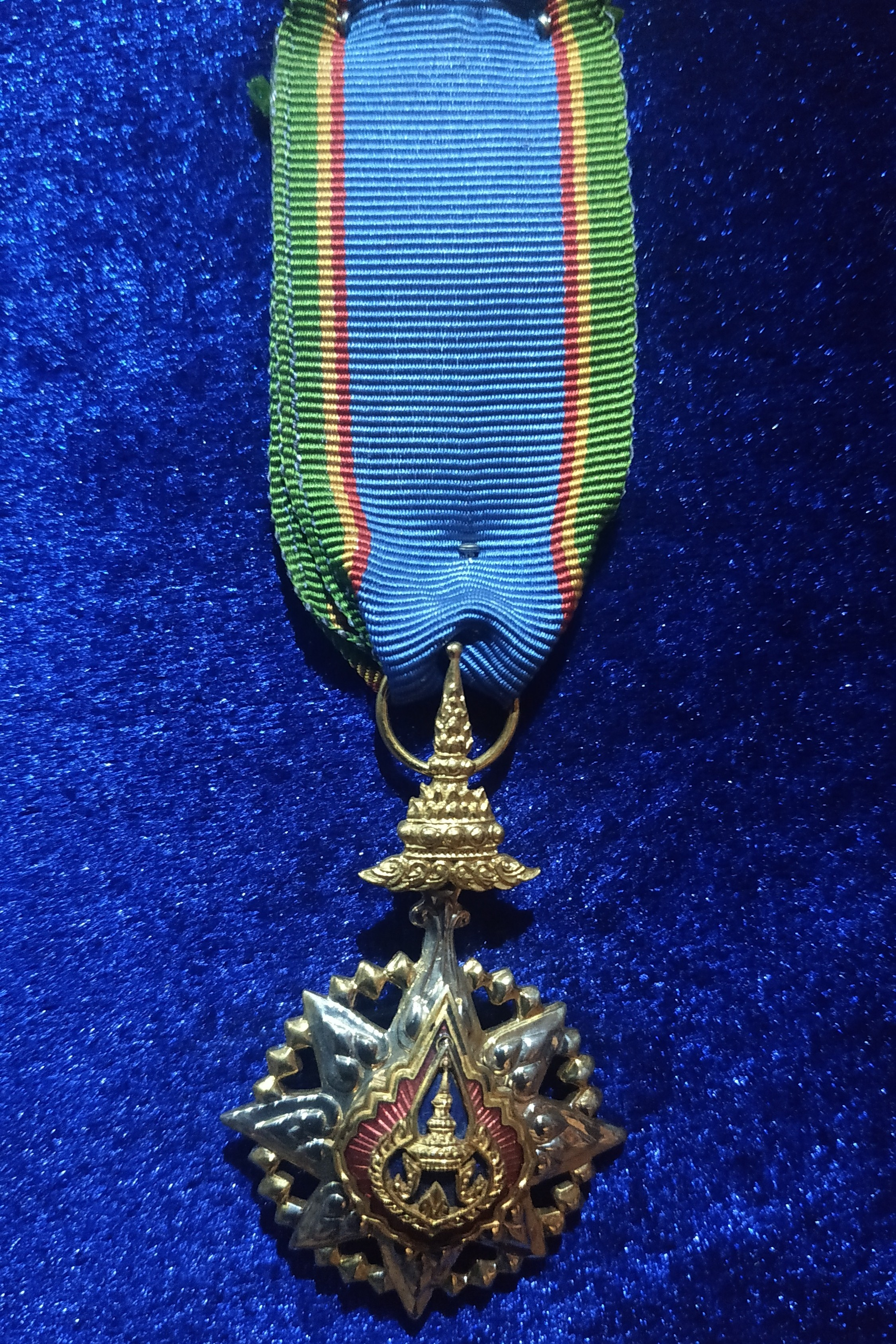
Badge of the Member (5th Class) of Order of the Crown of Thailand

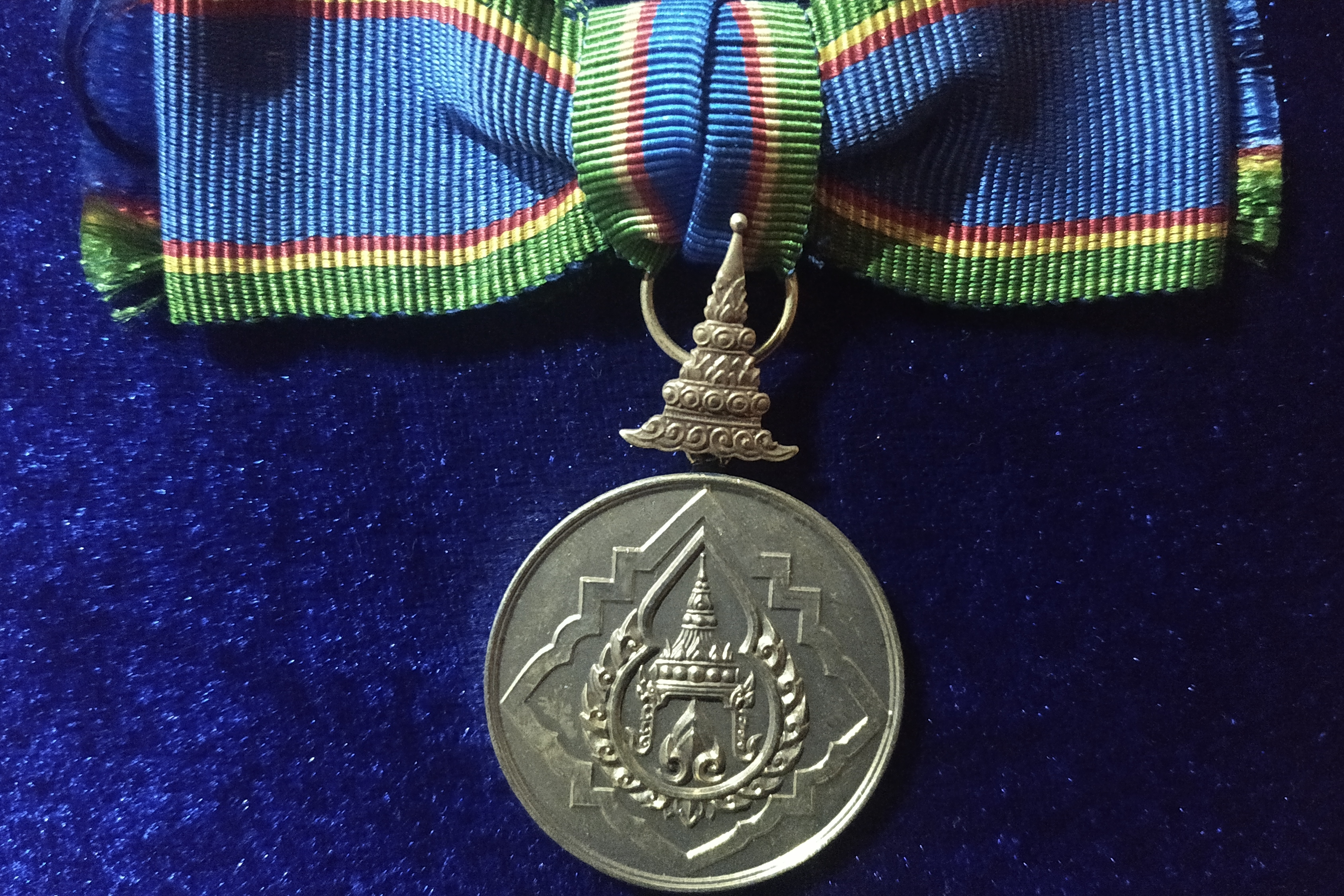
Silver Medal (7th Class) of Order of the Crown of Thailand, female version
