= Family tree of Thai monarchs =

The known history of the monarchy of Thailand begins with the founding of the Sukhothai Kingdom, inaugurated by Si Inthrathit in 1238. This was succeeded by the Ayutthaya Kingdom and the short-lived Thonburi Kingdom. The present reigning dynasty, the Chakri Dynasty, took the throne in 1782, founding the Rattanakosin Kingdom. The present-day constitutional monarchy was established in 1932. The Chakri kings are often known as Rama: the reigning monarch is King Rama X (Vajiralongkorn).

== Family tree ==
Sukhothai Kingdom

– Phra Ruang dynasty (1238–1368, 1368–1438)

Ayutthaya Kingdom

– Uthong dynasty (1351–1370, 1388–1409)

– Suphannaphum dynasty (1370–1388, 1409–1569)

– Sukhothai dynasty (1569–1629)

– Prasat Thong dynasty (1629–1688)

– Ban Phlu Luang dynasty (1688–1767)

Thonburi Kingdom

– Thonburi dynasty (1767–1782)

Rattanakosin Kingdom and Kingdom of Thailand (b. 1782)

– Chakri dynasty (b. 1782)

Si Inthrathit; 1188–1270 r. 1238–1270	Sueang
Ban Mueang d. 1271 r. 1270–1271	Ram Khamhaeng c. 1237/1247–1298 r. 1279–1298	(unknown)
Ngua Nam Thum d. 1347/48 r. 1323/24–1347/48	Loe Thai d. 1323 r. 1298–1323	May Hnin Thwe-Da b. c. 1250s	Wareru; King of Martaban; 1253–1307 r. 1287–1307	Hnin U Yaing c. 1260s – c. 1310s
(unknown)
Uthong; 1314–1369 r. 1351–1369	(unknown)	Pha Ngua d. 1388 r. 1370–1388	Princess	Li Thai d. 1368 r. c. 1347 – 1368	Saw O King of Martaban; 1283–1323 r. 1311–1323	May Hnin Htapi; Chief queen	Saw Zein; King of Martaban; 1303–1330 r. 1323–1330
Ramesuan; 1339–1395 r. 1369–1370; 1388–1395	Thong Lan; 1373/74- 1388/89 r. 1388/89	Nakhon In; 1359–1424 r. 1409–1424	Princess	Lue Thai d. 1399; 1368–1399
Ram Chao b. 1356/57 r. 1395/96–1409/10	Sam Phraya d. 1448 r. 1424–1448	Devi	Sai Leu Thai d. 1400; 1400–1419
Ramesuan; 1431–1488 r. 1448–1488	Borommapan d. 1438; 1419–1438	Phaya Ram
Intharacha	Borommaracha d. 1491 r. 1488–1491	Chetthathirat; 1473–1529 r. 1491–1529
Bunsi d. 1548 r. 1548	Sri Sudachan d. 1548	Chairachathirat d. 1546 r. 1534–1546	Atthitayawong d. 1533 r. 1529–1533	Thianracha; 1509–1569 r. 1548–1564; 1568–1569	Suriyothai; 1511–1548
Yotfa; 1536–1548 r. 1546–1548	Srisin; 1541–1560	Ratsadathirat; 1528/29–1534/35 r. 1533/34–1534/35	Boromdilok d. 1549	Thepkasattri
Maha Thammaracha; 1514–1590 r. 1569–1590	Wisutkasat	Mahinthrathirat; 1539–1569 r. 1564–1568; 1569	Ramesuan d. 1564
(unknown)
Bayinnaung; King of Toungoo; 1516–1581 r. 1550–1581	Suphankanlaya	Chao Khrua; Manichan	Naresuan; 1555/56–1605 r. 1590–1605	Ekathotsarot; 1556–1620 r. 1605–1620	(unknown)	Okya Sri; Thammathirat
Si Saowaphak d. 1620 r. 1620	Songtham; 1590–1628 r. 1620–1628	Suthammaracha d. 1656 r. 1656
(unknown)
Chetthathirat c. 1613–1629 r. 1628–1629	Athittayawong b. 1618 r. 1629	Sirithida	Prasat Thong c. 1600–1656 r. 1629–1656	Siri Kanlayani
Narai; 1633–1688 r. 1656–1688	Suriyong; Ratsami	Chai d. 1656 r. 1656
Kusawadi of Chiang Mai	Mahaburut; 1632–1703 r. 1688–1703	Sudawadi; Princess; Yothathep; 1656–1735	Srisuphan; Princess; Yothathip; 1636–1706
Suriyenthrathibodi; 1661–1709 r. 1703–1709	Rattana
Thongsuk; Princess; Rachanurak	Thai Sa d. 1732; 1709–1733	Khao; Princess; Aphainuchit	Borommakot; 1680–1758 r. 1733–1758	Phlap; Princess; Phiphitmontri
Prince; Noren	Thammathibet d. 1756	Ekkathat d. 1767 r. 1758–1767	Maoli	Uthumphon d. 1796 r. 1758	Vimolphakdi
Phra Akson Sunthonsat (Thongdi Chakri); 1702–1769; Prince Father	Yok; Princess Mother
Yong; Saetae	Nok Iang d. 1774; Princess Mother	Sri Anocha of Lampang; 1750–1821	Maha Sura Singhanat; Viceroy; 1744–1803 r. 1782–1803	Nak na Bangxang; 1737–1826; Queen	Phutthayotfa Chulalok (Rama I); 1737–1809 r. 1782–1809	Nui Yai of Nakhon Si Thammarat d. 1828; Concubine	Sa; Princess Thepsuthavadi d. 1799	Phra Intraraksa (Sem)
House of Maha Sura Singhanat
Son; Queen	Taksin (Borommaracha IV); 1734–1782 r. 1767–1782	Chimyai d. 1779; Concubine	Maha Senanurak; Viceroy; 1773–1817 r. 1809–1817	Praphaivadi; Princess; Depayavadi; 1777–1823	Chaem; Krachangfaa; Princess Sri; Sundhorndep; 1770–1808	House of Rama I	Maha Sakdiphonlasep; Viceroy; 1773–1832 r. 1824–1832	Thongyu	Anurak Devesh; Deputy Viceroy; 1746–1806 r. 1786–1806
Inthraphithak; Viceroy d. 1782 t. d. 1782	Abhaya; Dhibesra; Prince; Krashatra; Nujit; 1779–1809	House of Maha Senanurak	five other unnamed children	Riam; 1770–1837; Concubine	Phutthaloetla Naphalai (Rama II); 1767–1824 r. 1809–1824	Bunrot; 1767–1836; Queen	House of Maha Sakdiphonlasep	House of Anurak Devesh
House of Rama II
Bang; Concubine	Nangklao (Rama III); 1787–1851 r. 1824–1851	Sab; Concubine	Noo Dam; 1792–1793	Pom; 1791–1793	Pinklao; Viceroy; 1808–1866 r. 1851–1866	Aim; Sae-ong; Concubine
House of Rama III	House of Pinklao
Lakkhananukhun; 1814–1835	Ngiew; Suwannathat	Siriwongse; Prince; Mataya; Bitaksa; 1812–1839	Noi	Lamom; Princess; Sudaratana; Rajaprayura; 1818–1896	Wichaichan; Viceroy; 1838–1885 r. 1868–1885
House of Wichaichan
Somanass; 1834–1852; Queen	Samli; Bunnag; 1835–1900; Concubine	Ramphoei; Siriwong; 1834–1862; Queen	Mongkut (Rama IV); 1804–1868 r. 1851–1868	Piam; Sucharitakul; 1838–1904; Concubine	Bung; Indravimol; Concubine
House of Rama IV
Somanass; 1852–1852	Sukhumala Marasri; 1861–1927; Queen	Chulalongkorn (Rama V); 1853–1910 r. 1868–1910	Saovabha Phongsri; 1864–1919; Queen	Sunandha Kumariratana; 1860–1880; Queen	Sun; 1895–1949	Gagananga Yukala; Prince Bijit Prijakorn; 1855–1909
House of Rama V
Paribatra Sukhumbandhu; Prince of Nakhon Sawan; 1881–1944	Suddha Dibyaratana; Princess of Rattanakosin; 1877–1922	Kannabhorn Bejaratana; 1878–1880	Svasti Sobhana; Prince Svastivatana Visishtha; 1865–1935	Abha Barni; Gagananga; 1874–1938
Savang Vadhana; 1862–1955; Queen	Aum; Pisolyabutr; 1856–1877; Concubine	Yai; Sucharitakul; 1858–1936	Devan Udayawongse; Prince Devawongse; Varopakarn; 1858–1923	Prajadhipok (Rama VII); 1893–1941 r. 1925–1935	Rambai Barni; Svastivatana; 1904–1984; Queen
Vajirunhis; Crown Prince; 1878–1895	Mahidol Adulyadej; Prince of Songkla; 1892–1929; Prince Father	Sangwan; Talapat; 1900–1995; Princess Mother	Kitiyakara Voralaksana; Prince of Chanthaburi I 1874–1931	Absara Samarn; Devakula; 1877–1939	Chakrabongse Bhuvanath; Prince of Phitsanulok; 1883–1920; Hereditary Prince	Asdang Dejavudh; Prince of Nakhon Ratchasima; 1889–1924; Hereditary Prince	Vajiravudh (Rama VI); 1881–1925 r. 1910–1925	Suvadhana; Abhayavongsa; 1905–1985; Princess Consort
Aram; Rattanakul; Serireongrit; 1920–1982	Galyani Vadhana; Princess of Naradhiwas; 1923–2008	Ananda Mahidol (Rama VIII); 1925–1946 r. 1935–1946	Nakkhatra Mangala; Prince of Chanthaburi II; 1897–1953	Bua; Snidvongs; 1909–1999	Praphai; Sucharitakul; 1902–1975; Princess Consort	Bejaratana Rajasuda; 1925–2011
Dhasanawalaya; Rattanakul Serireongrit b. 1945	Sinthu; Sornsongkram; 1940–	Bhumibol Adulyadej (Rama IX); 1927–2016 r. 1946–2016	Sirikit; Kitiyakara; 1932–2025; Queen	Adulakit; Kitiyakara; 1930–2004	Bandhusavali; Yugala; 1933–2025	Busba; Kitiyakara b. 1934	Kalyanakit; Kitiyakara; 1929–1987
Jessica; Mickelich	Jitat; Sornsongkram b. 1974	Peter Ladd; Jensen b. 1951	Ubol Ratana b. 1951	Sirindhorn; Princess Royal b. 1955	Srali; Kitiyakara b. 1966
Sornsongkram family
David; Wheeler	Ploypailin; Jensen b. 1981	Poom; Jensen; 1983–2004	Sujarinee; Vivacharawongse b. 1962	Vajiralongkorn (Rama X) b. 1952 r. 2016–present	Srirasmi; Suwadee b. 1971	Soamsawali; Princess Suddhanarinatha b. 1957	Chulabhorn; Princess Srisavangavadhana b. 1957	Virayudh; Tishyasarin b. 1955
Wheeler family
Sirikitiya; Jensen b. 1985	Juthavachara; Vivacharawongse b. 1979	Vacharaesorn; Vivacharawongse b. 1981	Chakriwat; Vivacharawongse b. 1983	Dipangkorn Rasmijoti b. 2005	Suthida; Tidjai b. 1978; Queen	Bajrakitiyabha; Princess Rajasarinisiribajra; 1978-2026	Aditayadorn Kitikhun b. 1984	Siribha Chudhabhorn b. 1982
Riya; Gough	Vatchrawee; Vivacharawongse b. 1985	Sirivannavari b. 1987
