= Succession to the Thai throne =

The Thai royal succession is the arrangement of the names of the royal family and individuals in the line of succession to the throne of the Kingdom of Thailand. The succession to the throne is stipulated by the 1924 Palace Law of Succession and, after the Revolution in 1932, has been endorsed by every version of the Constitution of Thailand. However, while the Palace Law specifies that only men can be in the line of succession, the Constitution specifies that if the King has not nominated an heir, Parliament can appoint a royal daughter.

Previously, in the early Rattanakosin Kingdom, in cases where the King did not establish the Krom Phra Ratchawang Bowon Sathan Mongkhon, the royal succession system called "Anekchonnikorn Samosorn Sommut" was used, which was the resolution of a joint meeting of ministerial officials and high-ranking royal family members to select a member of the royal family who was suitable in terms of age and qualifications to ascend to the throne as the new King. It was abolished during the reign of King Chulalongkorn in 1886 and the position was changed to the position of Crown Prince. And since 1924, King Vajiravudh has enacted the Palace Law of Succession to certify the above-mentioned Crown Prince positions and to clearly lay down the entire line of succession to the throne.

== Rights ==
The right to succession to the throne is in accordance with the 1924 Palace Law of Succession, which arranges the order of succession according to the rights of the eldest royal son, the status of the mother, and emphasizes only males.

A person will be in this line of succession only if all of the following conditions are met:

- Accepted by the Thai people and the Royal Family (Article 10)
- Without even one of the following prohibited characteristics (Article 11):
  - Delusional mind,
  - Imprisonment in a serious crime case,
  - Incapability of the supreme patron of Buddhism,
  - Foreign consort,
  - Removal from the position of Crown Prince no matter in which reign,
  - Declared exclusion from the royal succession line (For example, having a mother who is a commoner)
- Not being a direct son of a royal family member who has prohibited characteristics according to Article 11 (Article 12)
- Not born by a royal woman, meaning a female member of the royal family (Article 13)

This final provision conflicts with the Constitution of Thailand from 1974 to the present, which states that in the event that there is no royal son, the parliament can give its approval for a royal daughter to succeed to the throne.

== Lines of succession ==
The Palace Law specifies those who have the right to the throne as follows:

- Article 5 states that the King has the exclusive right to appoint an heir apparent to the throne (in Thailand, the position of Crown Prince of Thailand)
- Article 6 provides that if the King dies after appointing an heir apparent to the throne, that heir may immediately ascend to the throne
- Article 8 states that if the King dies before the appointment of an heir apparent, the Chancellor shall invite the royal family member who is the number one heir presumptive in line for the throne according to the order of succession as specified in Article 9 (except for those who have the prohibited characteristics according to Article 11 and 12) to ascend to the throne

In the Constitution of Thailand (in this case, the current version, which is the 2017 version), the succession to the throne after the throne is vacant is specified in Article 21 in both cases, in 2 paragraphs, as follows:

- Paragraph One: If the King has already appointed an heir apparent to the throne, the cabinet shall inform the President of the National Assembly to convene a meeting of the National Assembly to acknowledge the appointment of the aforementioned heir to the throne before inviting the heir to ascend to the throne. When the Crown Prince accepts, the President of the National Assembly shall announce it to the public.
- Paragraph Two: If the King has not appointed an heir apparent to the Throne, the Privy Council shall propose the name of the heir presumption in accordance with Article 8 of the Palace Law (through Article 20 of the Constitution, which indirectly stipulates the use of the order of the Palace Law), which is called "the Successor to the Throne", through the cabinet, for the parliament to approve, which may also propose the name of a princess. If approved, the President of the National Assembly shall present the invitation for the successor to the throne. When the successor to the throne has accepted, the President of the National Assembly shall announce it to the public.

== Current line of succession ==
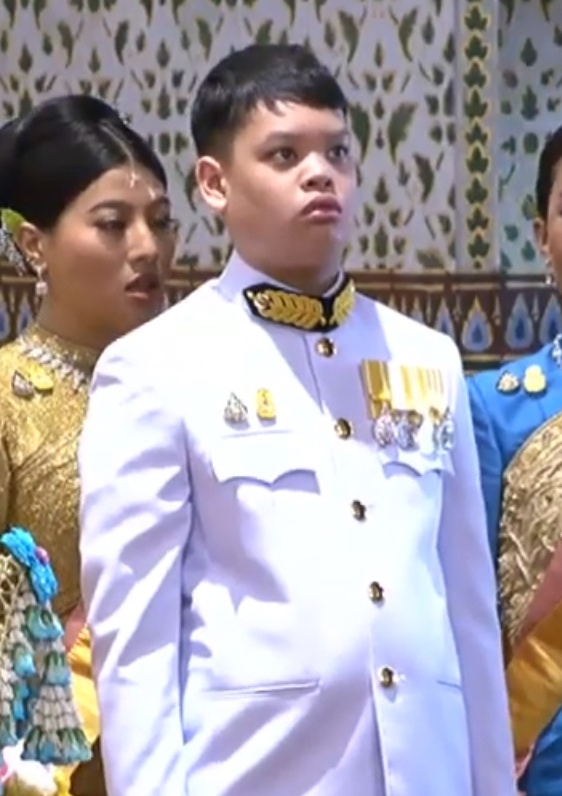
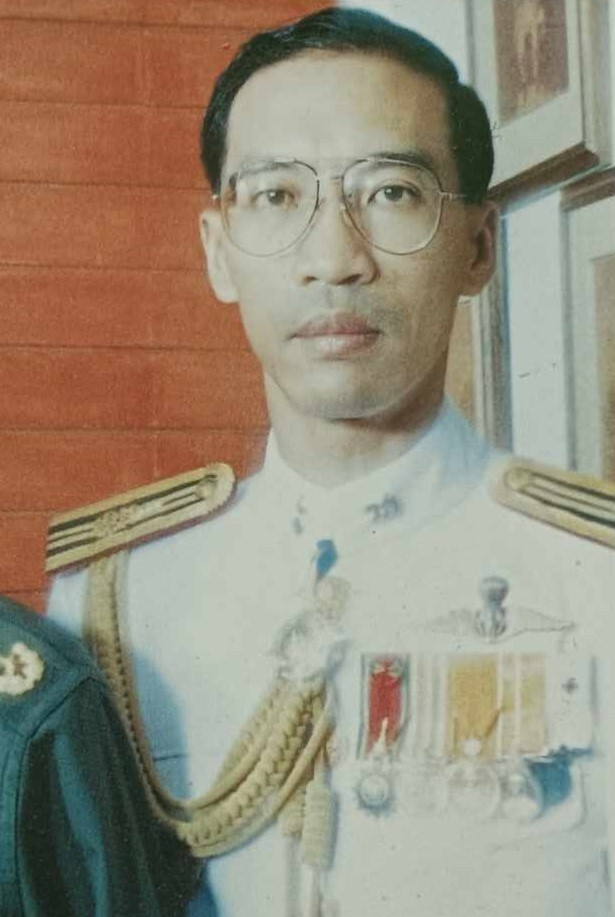
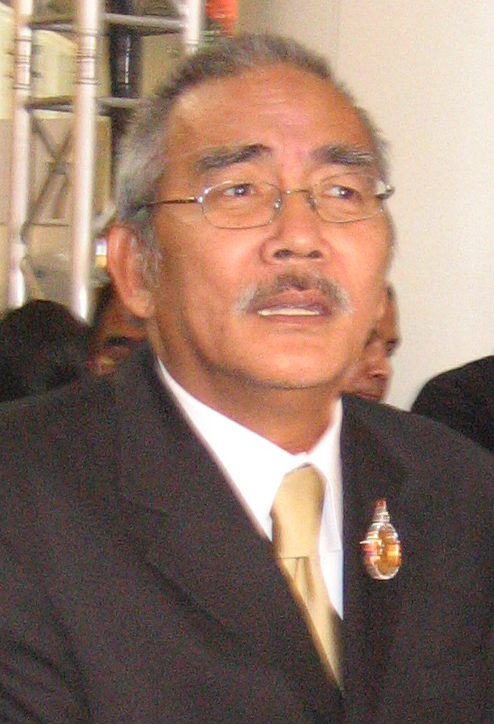
First five according to the Royal Succession Act (male heirs only) as of July 2, 2026
1. Prince Dipangkorn Rasmijoti
2. Prince Navaphan
3. Prince Chalermsuk
4. Prince Dighamborn
5. Prince Chatrichalerm

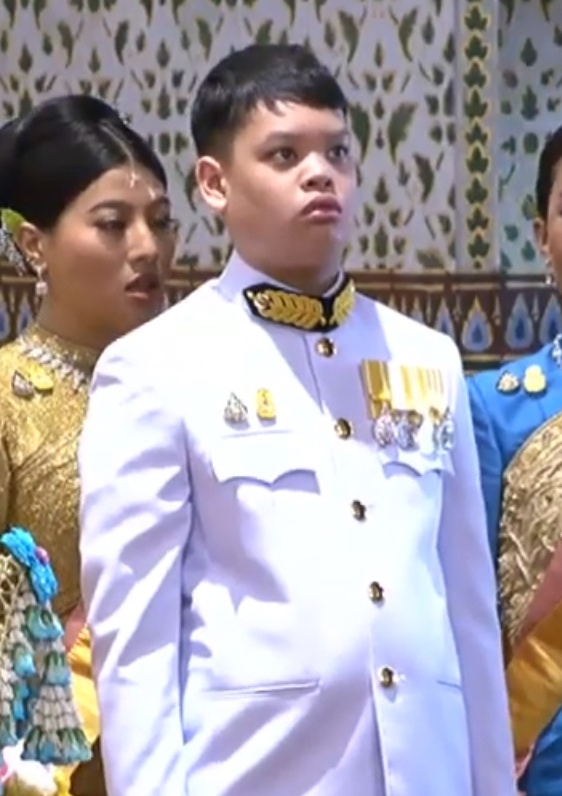
First five in line as of July 2, 2026 (male and female)
1. Prince Dipangkorn Rasmijoti
2. Princess Sirivannavari
3. The Princess Royal
4. The Princess Srisavangavadhana
5. Princess Siribha Chudabhorn

- King Mongkut (1804–1868)
  - King Chulalongkorn (1853–1910)
    - King Vajiravudh (1881–1925)
    - King Prajadhipok (1893–1941)
    - Crown Prince Vajirunhis (1878–1895)
    - Mahidol Adulyadej, Prince Father (1892–1929)
      - King Ananda Mahidol (1925–1946)
      - King Bhumibol Adulyadej (1927–2016)
        - (–) Princess Ubolratana Rajakanya (b. 1951)^{X C}
        - King Vajiralongkorn (born 1952)
          - (–) Juthavachara Vivacharawongse (b. 1979)^{X M P C}
          - (–) Vacharaesorn Vivacharawongse (b. 1981)^{X P C}
          - (–) Chakriwat Vivacharawongse (b. 1983)^{X P C}
          - (–) Vatchrawee Vivacharawongse (b. 1985)^{X P C}
          - (2) Princess Sirivannavari (b. 1987)^{C}
          - (1) Prince Dipangkorn Rasmijoti (b. 2005)^{P C}
        - (3) Sirindhorn, Princess Royal (b. 1955)^{C}
        - (4) Chulabhorn, Princess Srisavangavadhana (b. 1957)^{C}
          - (5) Princess Siribha Chudabhorn (b. 1982)^{C}
          - (6) Princess Aditayadorn Kitikhun (b. 1984)^{C}
    - Yugala Dighambara, Prince of Lopburi (1882–1932)
      - Prince Bhanubandhu Yugala (1910–1995)
        - (7) Prince Nawaphansa Yugala (b. 1968)^{P C}
      - Prince Chalermbol Dighambara (1913–1985)
        - (8) Prince Chalermsuk Yugala (b. 1950)^{P C}
        - (9) Prince Dighambara Yugala (b. 1951)^{P C}
      - Prince Anusorn Mongkolkarn (1915–1998)
        - (10) Prince Chatrichalerm Yugala (b. 1942)^{P C}
  - Chaiyanuchit, Prince Bongsadisramahip (1861–1936)
    - (11) Prince Charuridhidej Jayankura (b. 1936)^{P C}

Notes and sources
Mark	Source for listing or note on exclusion from succession
P	1924 Palace Law of Succession
C	1. In the case where the Throne becomes vacant and the King has already appointed an Heir to the Throne under the 1924 Palace Law on Succession, and may be submitted the name of a Princess in "Constitution of the Kingdom of Thailand 2017" Chapter II: The King, Section 21.; 2. The proposal of the name of a Princess to the throne, there has been an amendment to the constitution since 1974. Therefore, the lineage of the King Bhumibol Adulyadej is counted in accordance with the constitution amended in his reign.
M	Disqualified - married a foreigner
X	Was degraded from succession

The actual line of succession remains unclear since the current Thai monarch, Vajiralongkorn, has not designated an heir and any discussion of the topic in Thailand is forbidden by the country's lèse-majesté laws.

The heir presumptive is Prince Dipangkorn Rasmijoti, Vajiralongkorn's only son by his third consort Srirasmi Suwadee. However, he is widely presumed to have a developmental disorder that precludes him from taking the throne.

Princess Bajrakitiyabha, Vajiralongkorn's eldest daughter and the only child of his first wife Soamsawali, was the second in line to the throne and was long considered a likely successor. However, she fell into a coma in December 2022 and died on June 11, 2026.

Vajiralongkorn's four sons by his second wife Sujarinee Vivacharawongse were stripped of their royal titles and disowned in 1996, legally disqualifying them from the line of succession. The return of his second eldest son Vacharaesorn Vivacharawongse to Thailand in 2023, for the first time in 27 years, sparked talk of reconciliation and a possible return to the line of succession. However, brothers Juthavachara and Vatchrawee were denied entry to Thailand in May 2025, and Vacharaesorn and his brother Chakriwat were detained in Bangkok and deported in June 2025.

Vajiralongkorn's only daughter by Sujarinee, Princess Sirivannavari, was not disowned and remains in the line of succession. However, she has long stated that she has no interest in the throne.

Vajiralongkorn's sisters, the Princess Royal Sirindhorn and the Princess Srisavangavadhana Chulabhorn, are next in the line of succession. They are only a few years younger than Vajiralongkorn, and neither has male issue.

If there are no eligible descendents in Mahidol Adulyadej's bloodline, the succession passes to the heirs of Yugala Dighambara, the fifth son of King Chulalongkorn.
