= Crown Prince of Thailand =

Heir apparent to the Thai throne

- สยามมกุฎราชกุมาร
- Incumbent; Vacant since 13 October 2016
- Style: His Royal Highness
- Type: Heir apparent
- Member of: Chakri dynasty
- Appointer: Monarch
- Term length: Life tenure or until accession as Sovereign
- Precursor: Viceroy of Siam
- Inaugural holder: Vajirunhis
- Formation: 14 January 1886 (140 years ago)

The Crown Prince of Thailand (or Siam; Thai: สยามมกุฎราชกุมาร; RTGS: Sayammakutratchakuman; lit. the royal son of Siam) is a title held by the heir apparent to the Thai throne. It was created by King Chulalongkorn (Rama V) in 1886, for his son Prince Maha Vajirunhis, the king's eldest son by a royal wife Queen Savang Vadhana. Prior to this, the Siamese throne did not have a law or formal system regulating royal succession. In 1688, King Phetracha of Ayutthaya created the title of Front Palace, which by the Rattanakosin period had become the main title granted to the heir presumptive to the throne. However, few Front Palaces succeeded to the throne this way, with the exception of King Phutthaloetla Naphalai (Rama II) in 1809. After the death of Bowon Wichaichan in 1885, the title of Front Palace was abolished and replaced with the title of Crown Prince, who became heir apparent to the throne.

In 1924, King Vajiravudh (Rama VI) promulgated the 1924 Palace Law of Succession to regulate the succession. This law essentially barred females, children of commoner wives or children of foreign wives to the throne. It also re-affirmed agnatic primogeniture, or succession through the male line by seniority. This law also affected the individuals who could become Crown Prince. Since its creation, three Princes have been raised to this title, and two have succeeded to the throne.

The title in Thai, Sayammakutratchakuman, comes from conjugation of the words Sayam (Siam), Sanskrit makut (meaning "crown"), ratcha (from Sanskrit rāj), and kuman (from Sanskrit kumār, meaning "son").

== Crown Princes ==
Crown Princes of Thailand
Picture	Name	Relationship to monarch	Mother	Birth	Receive title	Ceased to be Crown Prince
	Vajirunhis	Eldest son with queens of King Rama V	Queen Savang Vadhana	27 June 1878	14 January 1886	4 January 1895 (death)
	Vajiravudh (later King Rama VI)	Third son with queens of King Rama V	Queen Saovabha Phongsri	1 January 1881	4 January 1895	23 October 1910 (ascension)
	Vajiralongkorn (later King Rama X)	Only son of King Rama IX	Queen Sirikit	28 July 1952	28 December 1972	13 October 2016 (ascension)

== Heirs-apparent and heirs-presumptive to the throne ==
List of heirs apparent and heirs presumptive since 1886, those in bold succeeded to the throne as king.

Heirs to the Thai Throne
Heir	Status	Relationship to monarch	Became heir		Ceased to be heir		Duration as heir	Next in line of succession (Relation to heir)	Monarch
Heir	Status	Relationship to monarch	Date	Reason	Date	Reason	Duration as heir	Next in line of succession (Relation to heir)	Monarch
Crown Prince Maha Vajirunhis	**Heir apparent**	Eldest son with queens (Note: Crown Prince Maha Vajirunhis, eighth son of Rama V and eldest son of Savang Vadhana.)	14 January 1886	New creation a modern succession	4 January 1895	Died of typhoid	8 years, 11 months and 21 days	**Prince Vajiravudh, Prince of Ayutthaya**; 1886–1895, younger half-brother	Rama V
**Crown Prince Maha Vajiravudh**	**Heir apparent**	Third son with queens (Note: Crown Prince Maha Vajiravudh, eleventh son of Rama V and eldest son of Saovabha Phongsri. Prince Isariyalongkorn, second son with queens, ninth son of Rama V and second son of Savang Vadhana, died 21 days after birth.)	4 January 1895	Elder half-brother died without children	23 October 1910	Father died; became king	15 years, 9 months and 19 days	Prince Chakrabongse Bhuvanath, Prince of Phitsanulok; 1895–1910, younger brother	Rama V
Prince Chakrabongse Bhuvanath, Prince of Phitsanulok	Heir presumptive	Younger brother	23 October 1910	Elder brother became king without children	13 June 1920	Died of pneumonia	9 years, 7 months and 21 days	Prince Asdang Dejavudh, Prince of Nakhon Ratchasima; 1910–1920, younger brother	Rama VI
Prince Asdang Dejavudh, Prince of Nakhon Ratchasima	Heir presumptive	Younger brother (Note: On 3 July 1923, King Vajiravudh had a stillborn son.)	13 June 1920	Elder brother died without full Thai children	9 February 1924	Died of nephrosis	3 years, 7 months and 27 days	Prince Chudadhuj Dharadilok, Prince of Phetchabun; 1910–1923, younger brother	Rama VI
Prince Asdang Dejavudh, Prince of Nakhon Ratchasima	Heir presumptive	Younger brother	13 June 1920	Elder brother died without full Thai children	9 February 1924	Died of nephrosis	3 years, 7 months and 27 days	Prince Varananda Dhavaj Chudadhuj; 1923–1924, nephew	Rama VI
Prince Varananda Dhavaj Chudadhuj	Heir presumptive	Nephew	9 February 1924	Uncle died without children	2 September 1924	Skipped by the royal command (Note: Prince Varananda Dhavaj Chudadhuj was skipped because his mother is a low-class commoner.)	6 months and 24 days	**Prince Prajadhipok Sakdidej, Prince of Sukhothai**; 1924, uncle	Rama VI
**Prince Prajadhipok Sakdidej, Prince of Sukhothai**	Heir presumptive	Younger brother	2 September 1924	Nephew was skipped	26 November 1925	Elder brother died without son; became king	1 year, 2 months and 24 days	Prince Mahidol Adulyadej, Prince of Songkla; 1924–1925, elder half-brother	Rama VI
Prince Mahidol Adulyadej, Prince of Songkla	Heir presumptive	Elder half-brother	26 November 1925	Younger half-brother became king without children	24 September 1929	Died of pneumonia	3 years, 9 months and 29 days	**Prince Ananda Mahidol**; 1925–1929, eldest son	Rama VII
**Prince Ananda Mahidol**	Heir presumptive	Half-nephew	24 September 1929	Father died	2 March 1935	Abdication of half-uncle without children; became king	5 years, 5 months and 6 days	**Prince Bhumibol Adulyadej**; 1929–1935, younger brother	Rama VII
**Prince Bhumibol Adulyadej**	Heir presumptive	Younger brother	2 March 1935	Elder brother became king without children	9 June 1946	Elder brother died without children; became king	11 years, 3 months and 7 days	Prince Paribatra Sukhumbandhu, Prince of Nakhon Sawan; 1935–1944, half-uncle	Rama VIII
**Prince Bhumibol Adulyadej**	Heir presumptive	Younger brother	2 March 1935	Elder brother became king without children	9 June 1946	Elder brother died without children; became king	11 years, 3 months and 7 days	Prince Chumbhotbongs Paribatra; 1944–1946, half-first cousin	Rama VIII
Prince Chumbhotbongs Paribatra, Prince of Nakhon Sawan II	Heir presumptive	Half-first cousin	9 June 1946	Half-first cousin became king without children	28 July 1952	Supplanted; Son born to king	6 years, 1 month and 19 days	Prince Sukhumabhinanda; 1946–1952, half-brother	Rama IX
**Crown Prince Maha Vajiralongkorn**	**Heir apparent**	Only son	28 July 1952	Born	13 October 2016	Father died; became king	64 years, 2 months and 15 days	Prince Chumbhotbongs Paribatra, Prince of Nakhon Sawan II; 1952–1959, half-first cousin once removed	Rama IX
**Crown Prince Maha Vajiralongkorn**	**Heir apparent**	Only son	28 July 1952	Born	13 October 2016	Father died; became king	64 years, 2 months and 15 days	Prince Sukhumabhinanda; 1959–1974, half-first cousin once removed	Rama IX
**Crown Prince Maha Vajiralongkorn**	**Heir apparent**	Only son	28 July 1952	Born	13 October 2016	Father died; became king	64 years, 2 months and 15 days	Princess Maha Chakri Sirindhorn, Princess Royal; 1974–1978, younger sister (Note: In 1974, the succession law was changed by the constitution from agnatic primogeniture to male-preference primogeniture.)	Rama IX
**Crown Prince Maha Vajiralongkorn**	**Heir apparent**	Only son	28 July 1952	Born	13 October 2016	Father died; became king	64 years, 2 months and 15 days	Princess Bajrakitiyabha; 1978–1979, only daughter	Rama IX
**Crown Prince Maha Vajiralongkorn**	**Heir apparent**	Only son	28 July 1952	Born	13 October 2016	Father died; became king	64 years, 2 months and 15 days	Prince Juthavachara Mahidol; 1979–1997, eldest son	Rama IX
**Crown Prince Maha Vajiralongkorn**	**Heir apparent**	Only son	28 July 1952	Born	13 October 2016	Father died; became king	64 years, 2 months and 15 days	Princess Bajrakitiyabha; 1997–2005, eldest daughter (Note: Prince Juthavachara, Prince Vacharaesorn, Prince Chakriwat, and Prince Vatchrawee was degraded from royalty.)	Rama IX
**Crown Prince Maha Vajiralongkorn**	**Heir apparent**	Only son	28 July 1952	Born	13 October 2016	Father died; became king	64 years, 2 months and 15 days	Prince Dipangkorn Rasmijoti; 2005–2016, only recognised son	Rama IX
Prince Dipangkorn Rasmijoti	Heir presumptive	Only recognised son (Note: Prince Dipangkorn Rasmijoti, fifth son of Rama X.)	13 October 2016	Father became king	Incumbent		10 years and 27 days	Princess Bajrakitiyabha; 2016–2026, eldest half-sister	Rama X
Prince Dipangkorn Rasmijoti	Heir presumptive	Only recognised son	13 October 2016	Father became king	Incumbent		10 years and 27 days	Princess Sirivannavari Nariratana; 2026-present, elder half-sister	Rama X
Prince Dipangkorn Rasmijoti	Heir presumptive	Only recognised son	13 October 2016	Father became king	Incumbent		10 years and 27 days	Princess Maha Chakri Sirindhorn , Princess Royal , Aunt	Rama X

== See also ==
Standard of the Crown Prince of Siam (1897–1910)

- 1924 Palace Law of Succession
- Monarchy of Thailand
- List of monarchs of Thailand
- Chakri dynasty
