= Uthaikanya Bhanubandhu =

Thai Princess (born 1933)

Uthaikanya Bhanubandhu; อุทัยกัญญา ภาณุพันธุ์
- Born: 24 October 1933 (age 93); Bangkok, Thailand
- House: Bhanubandhu
- Dynasty: Chakri
- Father: Nibandh Bhanubongs, Prince Bhanubongs Biriyadej
- Mother: Phayao Bhanubandhu na Ayudhya
- Religion: Theravada Buddhism

Princess Uthaikanya Bhanubandhu (Thai: อุทัยกัญญา ภาณุพันธุ์; RTGS: Uthaikanya Phanuphan; also spelled Udayakanya; born 24 October 1933) is a Princess of Thailand, a daughter of Nibandh Bhanubongs, The Prince Bhanubongs Biriyadej and one of his wife Mom Phayao Bhanubandhu na Ayudhya. She is officially styled as "Her Serene Highness Princess Uthaikanya Bhanubandhu" (หม่อมเจ้าอุทัยกัญญา ภาณุพันธุ์). She is a member of the Bhanubandhu collateral branch of the Chakri dynasty, the Royal Family of Thailand.

== Biography ==
=== Early life and education ===
Princess (Mom Chao) Uthaikanya (or Udayakanya) Bhanubandhu, the last children (and daughter) of Nibandh Bhanubongs, the Prince Bhanubongs Biriyadej (son of Prince Bhanurangsi Savangwongse) and one of his wife, Mom Phayao Bhanubandhu na Ayudhya, was born in Bangkok on 24 October 1933. In 1934, when she was only 9 months old, her father Prince Nibhandh Bhanubongs died and she was raised by her father's main wife, Princess Vilaikanya, as her own daughter.

Princess Uthaikanya lived with her stepmother until her death in 1966. Uthaikanya was also known by the informal name of Thanying (Lady) Nid (ท่านหญิงนิด).

=== Public role ===
The Princess entered the government service of the Office of the Civil Service Commission as a civil servant in the Prime Minister's Office. Princess Uthaikanya regularly performs religious service: she often practice the Dharma and the meditation. She collected donations to build a palace to honor the people who came to practice Dharma; later, the building was named in her honour. Other royal activities that Princess Uthaikanya carries out are related to the memory of Queen Debsirindra, one of the wives of King Mongkut. During the COVID-19 pandemic in Thailand, she donated 2 x 10L oxygen generators, 100 sets of finger oxygen meters and 100 sets of fever humidifiers to an hospital of Chiang Mai province.

On 11 March 2021, she visited Ban Lao Ngio temple in Changhan district and then toured a local scientific facility where she visited the premises. On 23 July 2021, she donated gifts to 12 Buddhist temples in the country on the occasion of the 2021 Buddhist Festival. On 6 August 2021, Princess Uthaikanya visited Wat Kaew Fa in Nonthaburi province to attend some religious events; she also made some donations. On 15 August 2021, she participated in a religious service hold at the Wat Hua Don, in That Phanom district; she watched the melting of a statue of the Buddha to be consecrated. On 26 October 2021, on the occasion of her 88th birthday (24 October), she attended a religious event where she received Buddhist prayers, at the Ruean Thai Phetpailin, in Nong Khaem district; later the same day, she attended the "Thepmahesak" Award Ceremony, which is awarded to those who support and promote the employment of people with disabilities.

On 15 February 2022, she presided over the laying of the foundation stone of the new Debsirin Samutprakan School building in Thai Mueang district; at the ceremony, she was welcomed by local officials. On 2 May 2022, she presided over the Nagaraja worship ceremony at Thitisararam Monastery, Bueng Khong Long District; then, she met with the monks present. On 8 May 2022, Princess Uthaikanya visited the Wat Champa Sa-Eueng in Tha Tum district, where she was received by the population and local public offices. On 26 October 2022, the Princess traveled to Khammouane province in Laos, to build friendly relations between Thailand and that area; she met with the Governor of Khammouane Province and visited some areas of the area, also meeting with Laotian officials. On 28 October 2022, she presided over a celebration ceremony at Pu Ta Uphad Ratchawong Shrine, Thai Mueang District, Mukdahan Province.

On 15 January 2023, Princess Uthaikanya toured Ratchawaree temple, in Chaturaphak Phiman district, where she chaired an annual rice delivery ceremony. On 19 January 2023, she visited the King Chulalongkorn Memorial Hospital in Bangkok to wish Princess Bajrakitiyabha a speedy recovery after her collapsed as a result of a heart condition. On 3 March 2023, Princess Uthaikanya attended the ceremony of delivery of candles and lanterns at the Wat Kanchanasinghas Worawihan, Taling Chan district, on the occasion of the Māgha Pūjā festival. On 28 March 2023, the Princess presented the "Thep Mahesak" award for the year 2023, at Nakhon Rim Khobfa, in Samut Prakan province; a total of 120 people were awarded. On 2 April 2023, she presided over the "2023 Thao Wessuwan" award ceremony at Skydome Resotel in Bangkok; this award is given to those who have made significant contributions to the nation. On 28 April 2023, she inaugurated the "Nokjab House" in Khlong Luang district, accompanied by public officials. On 29 July 2023, she presided over a religious ceremony at Wat Arun Ratchawararam Ratchawaramahawihan in Bangkok; she made offerings to the Buddha on the occasion of the Buddhist Lent.

On 10 January 2024, she attended a religious service on the occasion of the New Year and to offer blessings to the King and Queen. On 27 January 2024, she attended the opening of a project related to the ASEAN at PTT Pu Chao Samut Prakan, in Samut Prakan province. On 14 May 2024, she traveled to Phaisan Charoen Pruksa Phanthai, Soi Dao district, to attend the ceremony of laying the foundation stone at the Ganesha Maha Phokasap, a company that provides beauty consulting services. On 4 August 2024, she and Prince Chaloemsuek Yugala attended the celebrations for the 2024 National Communications Day in Bangkok. On 12 August 2024, she celebrated Mother's Day 2024 together with her staff privately in a restaurant in Nonthaburi province. On 24 October 2024, she traveled to Maha Sarakham province to attend a religious service at Wat Sriwichai temple, where she also made a donation, accompanied by the Governor of the province.

== Titles and honours ==
Styles of Princess Uthaikanya Bhanubandhu of Thailand
- Reference style: Her Serene Highness
- Spoken style: Your Serene Highness

=== Titles and styles ===
- 24 October 1933 – present: Her Serene Highness Princess Uthaikanya Bhanubandhu
  - (Thai: หม่อมเจ้าอุทัยกัญญา ภาณุพันธุ์; Mom Chao Uthaikanya Bhanubandhu)

=== Honours ===
- Thailand:
  - Dame 2nd Class of the Order of Chula Chom Klao
  - Dame 2nd Class of the Order of the White Elephant
  - Dame 2nd Class of the Order of the Crown of Thailand
  - Recipient of the Chakrabarti Mala Medal (Faithful Service Medal)
  - Recipient of the King Rama IX Coronation Medal

Uthaikanya Bhanubandhu House of Bhanubandhu Cadet branch of the House of Chakri Born: 24 October 1933
Order of precedence
Preceded by Prince Charuridhidej Jayankura	Thai order of precedence 17th position	Succeeded by Prince Nawaphansa Yugala
