= Sineenatha =

Consort of Vajiralongkorn (2019; 2020–present)

Sineenatha Bilaskalayani
- Royal Noble Consort
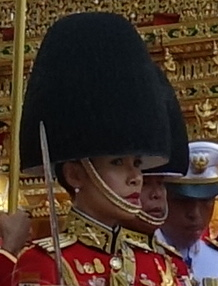
- Sineenatha in 2017

Royal noble consort of the Thai monarch
- Tenure: 28 July 2019 – 21 October 2019 (1st); 29 August 2020 – present (2nd)
- Born: Niramon Ounprom; 26 January 1985 (age 41); Tha Wang Pha, Thailand
- Spouse: Vajiralongkorn (Rama X) (m. 2019)
Names
- Sineenat Wongvajirapakdi (2014–2019); Sineenatha Bilaskalayani (since 2019)
- House: Mahidol (by marriage)
- Dynasty: Chakri (by marriage)
- Father: Wirat Ounprom
- Mother: Pranee Ounprom
- Military career
- Allegiance: Kingdom of Thailand
- Branch: Royal Thai Army; Royal Security Command
- Service years: 2008–2019; 2020–present
- Rank: General
- Commands: Royal Guards, Crown Prince's Division; King's Guard, Special Operations Unit

Sineenatha Bilaskalayani (Note: Thai: สินีนาถ พิลาสกัลยาณี; RTGS: Sininat Philatkanlayani) (born Niramon Ounprom, (Note: Thai: นิรมล อุ่นพรม, RTGS: Niramon Unphrom) later Sineenat Wongvajirapakdi, (Note: Thai: สินีนาฏ วงศ์วชิราภักดิ์; RTGS: Sininat Wongwachiraphak) 26 January 1985) is a Thai nurse and army officer who has been the Royal concubine of the Thai monarch in 2019 and again since 28 August 2020 as the consort of King Vajiralongkorn (Rama X). The first secondary consort in nearly a century, (Note: The primary consort is the queen consort, currently Suthida.) Sineenatha is also the first secondary consort since the establishment of the constitutional monarchy in Thailand in 1932.

== Early life and education ==
Sineenat was born on 26 January 1985, to the Ounprom family, Wirat (father) and Khun Ying Pranee (mother). Her nickname is Koi (ก้อย) and her place of birth is described as being in the Tha Wang Pha district of Nan province, Thailand. Her primary and secondary schools were also in the same district, at Rajapiyorasa Yupparachanusorn School, and at Tha Wang Pha Pittayakhom (Witthayakhom) School. She went on to earn a bachelor's degree in nursing at the Royal Thai Army Nursing College in Bangkok in 2008 as a member of Class 41; Ounprom presented a published conference paper on smoking cessation efforts among enlisted soldiers while affiliated with her college.

== Career ==
According to Sineenat's official court biography and other sources, from 2008 to 2012, Sineenat—then known by her earlier name, Niramon Ounprom—worked as a nurse at Phramongkutklao Hospital, and at an army hospital, the Ananda Mahidol Hospital.

Ounprom is described in her official biography as having risen to the rank of colonel by 2015, and as having "enrolled in the Ratchawallop Police Retainers, the Royal King's Guards 904". Before this, Ounprom completed military training in parachuting, royal bodyguarding, and the Thai army's "Combat Qualifying Course in Jungle Warfare". She holds a private pilot's license following training in Germany and flight school in 2018 with the Thai Air Force. As of May 2019, she held the rank of major general.

== Royal noble consort ==
After Prince Vajiralongkorn ascended the throne as King Rama X, he appointed her as his Royal Noble Consort, giving her the noble title of Chao Khun Phra (เจ้าคุณพระ, "royal noble consort") Sineenat Bilaskalayani (Thai: สินีนาฏ พิลาสกัลยาณี; RTGS: Sininat Philatkanlayani) in July 2019. In August 2019, a biography with 60 photos of Chao Khun Phra Sineenat, posted on the website of the Bureau of the Royal Household, was so frequently accessed that it caused the website to crash.

On 30 August 2019, as Sineenat (Sininat or Sinina), she was appointed deputy adviser of a prison reform initiative, "Sharing Happiness And Doing Good With Heart With the Department of Corrections".

=== Downfall and restoration ===
On 21 October 2019, King Rama X issued a royal edict stripping her of all her government, military, and noble ranks, positions, and titles, as well as royal decorations, citing her conflict with and disrespectful conduct towards his wife, Queen Suthida. Until October 2019, her whereabouts were unknown; she was rumoured to either be in prison or dead.

On 27 August 2020, the Lat Yao Central Women's Correctional Prison was reportedly closed to visitors for two days, and a Boeing 737 plane from King Rama X's private fleet was dispatched to Bangkok. According to journalist Andrew MacGregor Marshall, the prison is where she had been held and the events were part of a plan to transport her in secret to Munich where she would join his retinue in quarantine, in preparation for a possible future royal pardon and restoration of her titles.

On 29 August 2020, the restoration was made official with a royal edict stating that she had "never been a tarnished person" and proclaiming that all her titles, decorations and military ranks were fully restored as if they had never been revoked.

Sineenath in 2026

== Titles, styles, honours, and military ranks ==
All of her titles, honours, and military ranks were stripped by King Vajiralongkorn on 21 October 2019 and reinstated on 29 August 2020.

=== Titles and styles ===
- 26 January 1985 – 16 December 2014: Miss Niramon Ounprom (Thai: นิรมล อุ่นพรม)
- 16 December 2014 – 28 July 2019: Phan Ek ("Colonel") Sineenat Wongvajirapakdi (Thai: สินีนาฏ วงศ์วชิราภักดิ์)
- 30 April 2019 – 24 May 2019: Than Phu Ying ("High Lady") Phan Ek ("Colonel") Sineenat Wongvajirapakdi (Thai: ท่านผู้หญิงสินีนาฏ วงศ์วชิราภักดิ์)
- 24 May 2019 – 28 July 2019: Than Phu Ying ("High Lady") Phon Tri ("Major General") Sineenat Wongvajirapakdi (Thai: ท่านผู้หญิงสินีนาฏ วงศ์วชิราภักดิ์)
- 28 July – 21 October 2019: Chao Khun Phra ("Royal Noble Consort") Sineenat Bilasakalyani (Thai: เจ้าคุณพระสินีนาฏ พิลาสกัลยาณี)
- 21 October 2019 – 28 August 2020: Miss Sineenat Wongvajirapakdi (Thai: สินีนาฏ วงศ์วชิราภักดิ์)
- 28 August 2020 – 17 August 2024: Chao Khun Phra ("Royal Noble Consort") Sineenat Bilasakalyani (Thai: เจ้าคุณพระสินีนาฏ พิลาสกัลยาณี)
- 17 August 2024 – present: Chao Khun Phra ("Royal Noble Consort") Sineenatha Bilaskalyani (Thai: เจ้าคุณพระสินีนาถ พิลาสกัลยาณี)

=== Honours ===
- 17 August 2017: Dame Commander (Second Class) of The Most Exalted Order of the White Elephant (KCE)
- 3 May 2019: Dame Grand Cordon (Special Class) of The Most Exalted Order of the White Elephant (KGE) (Note: The Khaosod English and Royal Central articles refer to this honour as "The Most Exalted Order of the White Elephant, Special Class".)
- 30 April 2019: Dame Grand Cross (First Class) of The Most Illustrious Order of Chula Chom Klao (GCC)
- 3 May 2019: Dame Grand Cordon (Special Class) of The Most Noble Order of the Crown of Thailand (KGCT) (Note: The Khaosod English and Royal Central articles refer to this honour as "The Most Noble Order of the Crown of Thailand, Special Class".)
- 30 April 2019: Royal Cypher Medal of King Rama X, First Class (VPR1)

=== Military ranks ===
- 1 October 2008 – 31 October 2010: Second Lieutenant
- 1 November 2010 – 31 August 2015: First Lieutenant
- 1 September 2015 – 30 December 2016: Major
- 31 December 2016 – 23 May 2019: Colonel
- 24 May 2019 – present: Major-General

== Notes ==
Order of precedence
Preceded by Dame Dhasanawalaya Sornsongkram	Thai order of precedence The Royal noble consort 14th position	Succeeded by Prince Chalermsuk Yugala
