= Sunningdale School =

Location
- Dry Arch Road; Sunningdale, Berkshire, SL5 9PY; England
- Coordinates: 51.394°N 0.641°W

Information
- Type: Private preparatory school Day and boarding school
- Religious affiliation: Church of England
- Established: 1874
- Founder: William Girdlestone
- Local authority: Windsor and Maidenhead
- Proprietor: Thomas Dawson
- Headmaster: Thomas Dawson
- Gender: Boys
- Age: 7 to 13
- Enrolment: 94 (2025)
- Capacity: 105
- Colour: (school)
- Publication: Sunningdale E-Newsletter
- Website: www.sunningdaleschool.co.uk

Sunningdale School is a boys' preparatory independent boarding school of up to 105 pupils, situated in Sunningdale in Berkshire, close to London, England.

== History ==
The school was founded in 1874 by William Girdlestone, it has 25 acres (10 ha) of gardens and grounds. He was later joined by his son, Theophilus Girdlestone, who helped run the school for the next quarter of a century until William Girdlestone died on 22 February 1897 and Theophilus Girdlestone died on 25 June 1899. This led to the school being sold in 1900 to the next headmaster, F. L. Crabtree (1900–33), the pupils numbered 27. Since its foundation, the school has had only seven heads.

In 1967, the school was taken over by twins Tim and Andrew "Nick" Dawson. As of 2025, the school was owned and run by Tim's son Thomas Dawson.

The school was the subject of a BBC television documentary, Britain's Youngest Boarders, first broadcast in September 2010.

On 5 November 2015, a parent at the school was hit and killed by a car in the school's car park. The car was owned by the school and driven by a member of staff. The death was ruled to be accidental and no criminal charges were brought.

== Background ==
The school has its own chapel, and a house in Normandy, France to which each boy goes for a week three times during his time at Sunningdale. The school's major sports are football, rugby union and cricket in the Michaelmas, Lent and summer terms respectively. Boys also play tennis, squash, Eton Fives, basketball, field hockey, golf and table tennis against other independent boarding schools. Fives has been played at Sunningdale since at least 1892 and the school has 3 courts on site. They also compete in athletics, cross-country, fencing, judo and air rifle shooting. There is a heated indoor swimming pool which means that the boys can swim all year round. The sports hall includes two full-length cricket nets and an air rifle range. There is also a 7-hole golf course in the grounds. Boys can also ride and do clay pigeon shooting and in their last term they do an outward bound course on Dartmoor. Indoor activities include chess, model railway, cooking, bridge, snooker, Scottish dancing, drama, model making and board games.

== Former pupils ==
- Henry Blofeld, BBC cricket commentator
- Michael Bowes-Lyon, 18th Earl of Strathmore and Kinghorne
- Sir Henry Cecil, horse racing trainer
- Guy Clark, Lord Lieutenant of Renfrewshire
- John Crichton, 7th Earl Erne, property consultant
- Henry Field, US anthropologist who documented Iraq's Marsh Arabs
- Francis Fulford, Devon landowner, reality star of The F***ing Fulfords
- Bamber Gascoigne, British television presenter and author
- Gerald Grosvenor, 6th Duke of Westminster, the former richest aristocrat in the UK
- Frederick Hervey, 8th Marquess of Bristol
- Bernard Heywood, Church of England bishop
- Nick Hurd, Government Minister
- Prince Michael of Kent, cousin of Queen Elizabeth II and member of the Royal Family
- James Sassoon, Baron Sassoon, British businessman and politician
- Lord Frederick Windsor, British Royal and financial analyst
- William Kinghan, unionist politician, High Sheriff of Down, 1924
- Humphrey Lyttelton, jazz musician and BBC radio presenter
- Ferdinand Mount, writer and novelist
- Stephen Powys, 6th Baron Lilford
- Hugh van Cutsem, landowner, banker, businessman, and horse-breeder
- Vacharaesorn Vivacharawongse, former Thai prince
- Chakriwat Vivacharawongse, former Thai prince
