= Srirasmi Suwadee =

3rd wife of King Vajiralongkorn

Than Phu Ying Srirasmi Suwadee PChW MPCh MWM
- ศรีรัศมิ์ สุวะดี
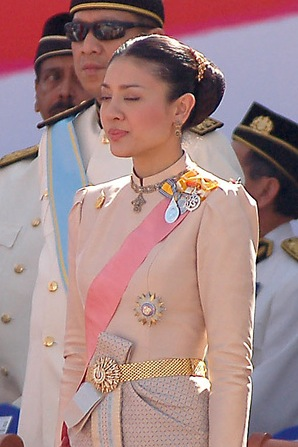
- Srirasmi in 2007
- Born: 9 December 1971 (age 54); Samut Songkhram, Thailand
- Education: Sukhothai Thammathirat Open University (BMS); Kasetsart University (MS)
- Spouse: Vajiralongkorn (Rama X) (m. 2001; div. 2014)
- Children: Prince Dipangkorn Rasmijoti
- Relatives: Pongpat Chayaphan (uncle)
- Military career
- Allegiance: Thailand
- Branch: Royal Thai Army
- Service years: 2012–2014
- Rank: Major general
- Commands: King's Guard

Srirasmi Suwadee (Note: Thai: ศรีรัศมิ์ สุวะดี; RTGS: Sirat Suwadi) (born 9 December 1971), formerly Princess Srirasmi, Royal Consort to the Crown Prince of Thailand (Note: Thai: พระเจ้าวรวงศ์เธอ พระองค์เจ้าศรีรัศมิ์ พระวรชายาฯ) is a former member of the royal family of Thailand. She was the third consort of then-Crown Prince Maha Vajiralongkorn (now Rama X) from February 2001 to December 2014.

== Early life ==
Srirasmi Suwadee was born in Samut Songkhram Province to a family of modest means. She was the third of four children born to Apiruj and Wanthanee Suwadee, and is of Mon-Thai descent from her mother's side.

She attended Bangkok Business College and in 1993, at age 22, entered the service of Vajiralongkorn as a "lady-in-waiting". Srirasmi enrolled in Sukhothai Thammathirat Open University in 1997 and graduated in 2002 with a bachelor's degree in management science. Vajiralongkorn personally bestowed her with her diploma. In 2007, she received a Master of Science degree in Family and Child Development from Kasetsart University.

== Marriage and family ==
Srirasmi married the Crown Prince of Thailand on 10 February 2001 in a private ceremony at the prince's Nonthaburi Palace. The public was informed of the event some time afterwards. The prince, who had married twice before and has children with his previous wives, stated it was his intention to settle down: "I am now 50 years old and think I should have a complete family." After the wedding, Srirasmi was styled Mom Srirasmi Mahidol na Ayudhya (Mahidol is the surname of King Bhumibol Adulyadej and King Ananda Mahidol, and the na Ayudhya designation signifies non-titled descendants of the Chakri dynasty and their spouses).

On 14 February 2005, it was announced that Srirasmi was pregnant. On 29 April 2005, a son named Dipangkorn Rasmijoti was born via caesarean section at Siriraj Hospital. Because of the birth, she was granted by King Bhumibol Adulyadej the title "Princess of Thailand" and styled "Her Royal Highness" as the royal consort of Crown Prince Maha Vajiralongkorn. A royal ceremony, called "Phra Ratchaphithi Somphot Duean Lae Khuen Phra U," to celebrate the first month of the baby was held on 17 June 2005 at the Ananta Samakhom Throne Hall in Bangkok.

Srirasmi initiated and launched the "Sai Yai Rak Chak Mae Su Luk" (Love and care from mother to children) campaign which promoted breast feeding. The campaign features images of her son.

Srirasmi came to wider public attention in 2009, when she appeared in a leaked video feeding a birthday cake to her husband's dog Fufu while only wearing a G-string.

== Divorce and loss of title ==
A letter asking for Srirasmi's family to be stripped of their royal name was sent to the interior ministry in November 2014. The letter was sent by her husband, Crown Prince Vajiralongkorn, after allegations of corruption against seven of her relatives. On 11 December 2014, the Royal Thai Government Gazette announced that Srirasmi relinquished her royal title, presumably due to the corruption affairs that involved her family. Srirasmi was granted a payment of 200 million baht (US$6 million) by Maha Vajiralongkorn in exchange for her relinquishment. The money was paid out of the Crown Property Bureau, as confirmed by the Ministry of Finance.

After Srirasmi's divorce, her parents, father Apiruj Suwadee, 72, and mother Wanthanee, 66, were arrested for lèse-majesté. The two later admitted to misusing their royal connection 12 years prior, which led to a former neighbor being jailed on bogus fraud charges. Both were sentenced to five years in prison, reduced to two and a half years after pleading guilty to defaming the monarchy. One week later, her brothers Maj. Natthapol Suwadee, Narong Suwadee and Sitthisak Suwadee were jailed for five-and-a-half years. She chose to embrace a monastic life as a maechi, residing in simplicity while effectively being under house arrest.

== Titles, styles, and honours ==
Styles of Princess Srirasmi, Royal Consort (2005 — 2014)
- Reference style: Her Royal Highness
- Spoken style: Your Royal Highness

Titles and Styles

- Miss Srirasmi Suwadee (9 December 1971 – 10 February 2001)
  - Thai: ศรีรัศมิ์ สุวะดี (RTGS: Sirat Suwadi)
- Mom Srirasmi Mahidol na Ayudhya (10 February 2001 – 15 June 2005)
  - Thai: หม่อมศรีรัศมิ์ มหิดล ณ อยุธยา (RTGS: Mom Sirat Mahidon na Ayutthaya)
- Her Royal Highness Princess Srirasmi, Royal Consort to Crown Prince Maha Vajiralongkorn of Thailand (15 June 2005 – 11 December 2014)
  - Thai: พระเจ้าวรวงศ์เธอ พระองค์เจ้าศรีรัศมิ์ พระวรชายาในสมเด็จพระบรมโอรสาธิราช เจ้าฟ้ามหาวชิราลงกรณฯ สยามมกุฎราชกุมาร (RTGS: Phra Chao Worawong Thoe Phra Ong Chao Sirat Phra Worachaya nai Somdet Phra Boromma Orasathirat Chao Fa Maha Wachiralongkon Sayam Makut Ratchakuman)
- Than Phu Ying Srirasmi Suwadee (11 December 2014 – present)
  - Thai: ท่านผู้หญิงศรีรัศมิ์ สุวะดี (RTGS: Than Phu Ying Sirat Suwadi)

=== National honours ===
- Dame Grand Cross of the Order of Chula Chom Klao, First Class (2005)
- Dame Grand Cordon of the Order of the White Elephant (2005)
- Dame Grand Cordon of the Order of the Crown of Thailand (2005)
- King Rama IX Royal Cypher Medal, First Class (2008)

=== Symbols ===
Royal monogram of Princess Srirasmi

Royal flag of Princess Srirasmi

== Notes ==
Thai royalty
Vacant Title last held by Soamsawali Kitiyakara	Royal Consort of the Crown Prince of Thailand; 2005–2014	Vacant
