= William Kingan =

Politician in Northern Ireland

William Sinclair Kingan (6 December 1876 – 1946) was a unionist politician in Northern Ireland.

Kingan studied at Sunningdale School and Rugby School before working as a pork manufacturer. In 1924, he served as High Sheriff of Down.

He joined the Ulster Unionist Party, and was elected to the Senate of Northern Ireland in 1940, serving until his death in 1946. Most notably, he served as a Deputy Speaker of the Senate in 1945.
