= Chalermsuk Yugala =

Thai military general and member of Thai royal family

Chalermsuk Yugala; เฉลิมศึกยุคล
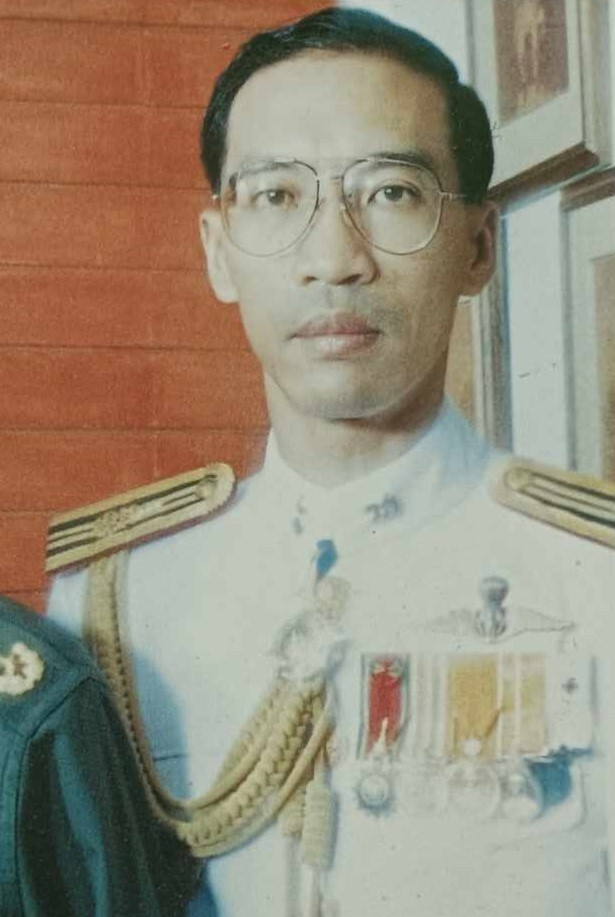
- Born: 24 October 1950 (age 75); Bangkok, Thailand
- House: Yugala
- Dynasty: Chakri
- Father: Chalermbol Dighambara
- Mother: Thongthaem Yugala
- Occupation: Military (army) officer

Prince Chalermsuk Yugala (Thai: เฉลิมศึกยุคล RTGS: Chaloemsuek Yukhon; born 24 October 1950) is a Thai military general and member of the Thai royal family. Born with the royal rank of Mom Chao 'His Serene Highness', he was granted the rank of Phra Ong Chao 'His Highness' by King Vajiralongkorn through a royal decree, making him the first member of the House of Yugala, a cadet branch of the Chakri Dynasty, to receive this honor.

== Biography ==
The Prince is the son of Prince Chalermpon Tikamporn and his wife, Thongtam Yukol na Ayudhya. As the grandson of Yugala Dighambara, Prince of Lopburi, and the great-grandson of King Chulalongkorn (Rama V), he belongs to a distinguished lineage. He attended Bangkok Christian College for his secondary education before earning a degree in Biological Sciences from Macquarie University in Sydney, Australia. He also completed the Chemical, Biological, Radiological, and Nuclear Survival Program at the U.S. Army.

He served as Deputy Director General of the Royal Thai Army Chemical Department and held other significant military positions. Post-retirement, he chaired the Biological Weapons Convention of Thailand, led the National Center for Genetic Engineering and Biotechnology (BIOTEC), and served as a UN Chemical Weapons Inspector in Chemical Weapons Convention. He is also a patron of numerous charitable organizations.

In 2019, Prince Chalermsuk was promoted to the rank of General and appointed Honorary Military Officer to the King’s Bodyguard under the Royal Security Command. Prince Chalermsuk became the first member of the House of Yugala to be granted the style of "His Highness," marking a historic elevation as the first minor royal to be raised from "His Serene Highness" during the reign of King Vajiralongkorn.

== Honours ==
Title and styles

- 24 October 1950 – 16 June 2024: His Serene Highness Prince Chalermsuk Yugala
- 16 June 2024 – present: His Highness Prince Chalermsuk Yugala

Royal Decorations

- Knight Grand Cross of the Most Illustrious Order of Chula Chom Klao
- Knight Grand Cordon of the Most Exalted Order of the White Elephant
- Knight Grand Cordon of the Most Noble Order of the Crown of Thailand
- King Rama X Royal Cypher Medal, Second Class
- Order of the Direkgunabhorn, Silver Medal
- Chakra Mala Medal (Medal for Long Service and Good Conduct)
- King Rama IX Coronation Medal
- Red Cross Medal of Appreciation, Second Class

Foreign Honours

- UN:
  - United Nations Special Service Medal

Chalermsuk Yugala House of Yugala Cadet branch of the House of Chakri Born: 24 October 1950
Lines of succession
Preceded by Prince Nawaphansa Yugala	Line of succession to the Thai throne 8th in line	Followed by Prince Dighambara Yugala
Order of precedence
Preceded by Chao Khun Phra Sineenatha	Thai order of precedence 15th position	Succeeded by Prince Charuridhidej Jayankura
