= Order of precedence in Thailand =

Relative preeminence of officials for ceremonial purposes

The order of precedence in Thailand is the official ranking of relative preeminence of members of the Thai Royal Family and other officials for ceremonial purposes. It determines the sequence in which individuals are recognised at formal state and royal occasions. The order distinguishes between gentlemen and ladies, and is rooted in historical royal tradition. King Chulalongkorn described the foundational principles of this order in his work on the traditions of the Royal Family of Siam.

== Royal Family ==
King Chulalongkorn described the order of precedence in his literature "Traditional of Royal Family of Siam".

=== Gentlemen ===
1. The Sovereign
2. The Viceroy (Grand Commander)
3. The Viceroy (Commander)
4. The Deputy Viceroy
5. Sons of the Former Sovereign and Queen
  1. Great Uncles of the Sovereign
  2. Uncles of the Sovereign
  3. Brothers of the Sovereign
6. Sons of the Sovereign and Queen
7. Sons of the Former Sovereign and Royal Consort
  1. Great Uncles of the Sovereign
  2. Uncles of the Sovereign
  3. Brothers of the Sovereign
8. Sons of the Sovereign and Royal Consort
9. Sons of the Former Sovereign and Royal Concubine
  1. Great Uncle of the Sovereign
  2. Uncles of the Sovereign
  3. Brothers of the Sovereign
10. Sons of the Sovereign and Royal Concubine
11. Nephews of the Sovereign
12. Grandsons of the Sovereign who are sons of son of the Sovereign and daughter of the Sovereign
13. Sons of the Viceroy and Royal Consort
14. Sons of the Former Viceroy
15. Sons of the Viceroy
16. Grandsons of the Sovereign who are sons of son of the Sovereign and Queen or Royal Consort and Princess
17. Grandsons of the Sovereign who are sons of son of the Sovereign and Royal Concubine and Princess
18. Sons of Prince Matayabitak, the Prince Maternal Grandfather of Rama V
19. Sons of the Deputy Viceroy and Royal Consort
20. Grandsons of the Sovereign who are sons of son of Sovereign and the commoner
21. Royal Great Grandsons of the Sovereign

=== Ladies ===
1. Queen Mother
2. The Sovereign's Consort (Queen)
3. Queen Dowager
4. Royal Consort
5. Daughters of the Former Sovereign and Queen
  1. Great Aunts of the Sovereign
  2. Aunts of the Sovereign
  3. Sisters of the Sovereign
6. Daughters of the Sovereign and Queen
7. Daughters of the Former Sovereign and Royal Consort
  1. Great Aunts of the Sovereign
  2. Aunts of the Sovereign
  3. Sisters of the Sovereign
8. Daughters of the Sovereign and Royal Consort
9. Daughters of the Former Sovereign and Royal Concubine
  1. Great Aunts of the Sovereign
  2. Aunts of the Sovereign
  3. Sisters of the Sovereign
10. Daughters of the Sovereign and Royal Concubine
11. Nieces of the Sovereign
12. Royal Consort who are granddaughters of the Sovereign
13. Granddaughters of the Sovereign who are daughters of son of the Sovereign and daughter of the Sovereign
14. Daughters of the Viceroy and Royal Consort
15. Daughters of the Former Viceroy
16. Daughters of the Viceroy
17. Granddaughters of the Sovereign who are daughters of son of the Sovereign and Queen or Royal Consort and Princess
18. Granddaughters of the Sovereign who are sons of daughters of the Sovereign and Royal Concubine and Princess
19. Daughters of Prince Matayabitak, the Prince Maternal Grandfather of Rama V
20. Daughters of the Deputy Viceroy and Royal Consort
21. Granddaughters of the Sovereign who are daughters of son of Sovereign and the commoner
22. Royal Great Granddaughters of the Sovereign

=== Current Order of Precedence ===
Order	Name	Note
1	HM The King	
2	HM The Queen	
3	HRH The Princess Debaratana Rajasuda	
4	HRH The Princess Srisavangavadhana	
5	Princess Ubol Ratana	In spite of relinquishing all noble titles, she is included in the order because she is the daughter of the former King and oldest sister of the current King
6	HRH The Princess Suddhanarinatha	Bestowed the honor on a special case
7	HRH Princess Sirivannavari	
8	HRH Prince Dipangkorn Rasmijoti	
9	HRH Princess Siribha Chudabhorn	
10	HRH Princess Aditayadorn Kitikhun	
11	Than Phu Ying Ploypailin Jensen	She is granddaughter of the former King, graciously accepted to be ranked higher than a prince who is the title Serene Highness is a special case.
12	Than Phu Ying Sirikitiya Jensen	She is granddaughter of the former King, graciously accepted to be ranked higher than a prince who is the title Serene Highness is a special case.
13	Than Phu Ying Dhasanawalaya Sornsongkram	Graciously accepted to be ranked higher than a prince who is the title Serene Highness is a special case.
14	Chaokhun Phra Sineenatha Bilasakalyani	Graciously accepted to be ranked higher than a prince who is the title Serene Highness is a special case.
15	HH Prince Chalermsuk Yugala	
16	HSH Prince Charuridhidej Jayankura	
17	HSH Princess Udayakanya Bhanubandhu	
18	HSH Prince Nawaphansa Yugala	
19	HSH Princess Srisavangvongse Yugala	HM King Rama X re-bestowed her title on 7 December 2025
20	HSH Prince Dighambara Yugala	
21	HSH Prince Chatrichalerm Yugala	
22	HSH Princess Nobhadol Chalermsri Yugala	
23	Mr. Juthavachara Vivacharawongse	
24	Mr. Vacharaesorn Vivacharawongse	
25	Mr. Chakriwat Vivacharawongse	
26	Mr. Vatchrawee Vivacharawongse	
27	Dame Vudhichalerm Vudhijaya	
28	Mrs. Bandhuvarobas Svetarundra	
29	Mrs. Bhanuma Phiphitphokha	
30	Mrs. Bhumribiromya Schell	
31	Mrs. Padmonrangsi Senanarong	
