= Chakriwat Vivacharawongse =

Son of Rama X and former Thai prince

- จักรีวัชร วิวัชรวงศ์
- Born: Chakriwat Mahidol; 26 February 1983 (age 43); Bangkok, Thailand
- Other name: Ong
- Education: University of Miami
- Occupation: Physician
- Parents: Vajiralongkorn (Rama X); Sujarinee Vivacharawongse
- Relatives: Bhumibol Adulyadej (Rama IX) (grandfather)

Chakriwat Vivacharawongse (Thai: จักรีวัชร วิวัชรวงศ์, RTGS: Chakkriwat Wiwatcharawong; 26 February 1983) is a Thai-American doctor and former member of the Thai royal family. Born as the third son and fourth child of then Crown Prince Vajiralongkorn, he fled Thailand after being banished in 1996 along with his brothers and mother. He has a genetic condition, neurofibromatosis type II. He is also the founder and CEO of Chakriwat Medical Information Center.

== Early life and education ==
Chakriwat was born on 26 February 1983 to then Crown Prince Vajiralongkorn and then wife Sujarinee Vivacharawongse, He was third son of the King Vajiralongkorn. He has 2 older brothers: Juthavachara (born 29 August 1979) and Vacharaesorn (born 27 May 1981); one younger brother, Vatcharawee (born 14 June 1985); and one younger sister, Sirivannavari (born 8 January 1987). However, his sister was abducted from Britain and returned to Thailand and remains in the line of succession and with her titles.

Doing their time in Thailand, they grew up at the Royal Palace, but were educated in the United Kingdom and attended Sunningdale prep school and Pangbourne College, both in Berkshire. As a teenager, he was diagnosed with neurofibromatosis type II after noting a lump on his neck, which was later removed and biopsied. This later inspired him to seek a career in medicine.

In 1996, Vajiralongkorn accused Sujarinee of adultery and exiled her and her sons from Thailand, with Chakriwat and his brothers being stripped of their titles. In 1998 at age 15, he co-signed a letter with his brothers where they accused their father of "trying to erase memories of us" and that he never loved their mother and would force them outside of their house "every time he found another woman". In 1996, the United States granted them political asylum and were given passports, enabling Chakriwat to continue living in New York. He continued his education at Trinity Prepraratory School. In 2006, he graduated with a BA in Psychology and Biology from the University of Miami, before going on to study medicine, entering the medical school of University of Miami with the Doctor of Medicine program.

== 2023 return to Thailand ==
Along with his older brother, Vacharaesorn, he returned to Thailand, arriving on the morning of 12 August 2023. His arrival caused Vacharaesorn to postpone his departure back to the United States which was planned for 13 August. Together, they visited Phra Nakhon Si Ayutthaya province on 12 August before both visiting Siriraj Hospital in Bangkok on 13 August, where they paid their respects to their ancestors Bhumibol Adulyadej and Mahidol Adulyadej.

On 24 June 2025, he was deported from Thailand.

== Careers ==
After graduating from medical school Chakriwat established Chakriwat Medical Information Center (CMIC). He also periodically expressed concern for the Thai public health system.

== Health ==
In September 2026, Vivacharawongse publicly reported a deterioration in his health. On 6 September, he said that he was unwell but was trying to recover. On 18 September, he said that his condition was serious and that he needed urgent brain surgery. Later reports said that he was receiving treatment in Malaysia and had said that he wanted to return to Thailand for treatment. He also said that he required surgery for two brain tumours.

On 28 September, Vivacharawongse said that he had spent two nights in an intensive care unit before being moved to a regular ward. He reported confusion, weakness, difficulty speaking and eating, high blood pressure and increased swelling inside the skull, and said that he might need surgery soon.

Chakriwat Vivacharawongse House of Vivacharawongse Cadet branch of the House of Mahidol Born: 26 February 1983
Order of precedence
| Preceded by Vacharaesorn Vivacharawongse | Thai order of precedence 25th position | Succeeded by Vatchrawee Vivacharawongse |
