= Sukhothai Thammathirat Open University =

Open university in Thailand

Sukhothai Thammathirat Open University (STOU)
- มหาวิทยาลัยสุโขทัยธรรมาธิราช
- Type: Public, open university
- Established: 1978
- Affiliations: ASAIHL, AAOU
- President: Assoc. Prof. Dr. Taweewat Watthanakuljaroen
- Royal conferrer: King Vajiralongkorn
- Undergraduates: 169,798
- Postgraduates: 3,186
- Location: Muang Thong Thani, Nonthaburi, Thailand; 13°54′37″N 100°32′12″E
- Colours: Green - gold
- Website: www.stou.ac.th

Sukhothai Thammathirat Open University (STOU; Thai: มหาวิทยาลัยสุโขทัยธรรมาธิราช, RTGS: Mahawitthayalai Sukhothai Thammathirat; Sukhothai Thammathirat University) is the only open university in Thailand. The campus is located in Muang Thong Thani.

== History ==
Sukhothai Thammathirat Open University was officially established by royal charter on 5 September 1978 as Thailand's eleventh state university to provide the people with increased education opportunities. King Bhumibol Adulyadej (King Rama IX), bestowed the name "Sukhothai Thammathirat Open University" in the honor of King Prajadhipok (Rama VII), one of whose titles before his accession to the throne was "Prince Sukhothai Thammaracha" or "Prince of Sukhothai". It was the first open university in Southeast Asia to use a distance teaching/learning system.

STOU received its first academic class on 1 December 1980, beginning with three schools of study: educational studies, liberal arts, and management science. From 1979 to 1984, STOU shared space with other state agencies and universities. In 1981, the university acquired its current property in Pak Kret District of Nonthaburi Province, and began operating from the new location on 9 December 1984. Today the university has 12 schools of study with undergraduate, graduate, and certificate programs.

== Schools ==
- School of Law
- School of Communication Arts
- School of Human Ecology
- School of Political Science
- School of Management Science
- School of Health Sciences
- School of Liberal Arts
- School of Education
- School of Economics
- School of Agriculture and Cooperatives
- School of Science and technology
- School of Nursing

== Notable alumni ==
- King Vajiralongkorn, King of Thailand (LL.B., Second class honour)
- Princess Bajrakitiyabha, Princess of Thailand (B.Pol.Sc., First class honour)
