= Dipangkorn Rasmijoti =

Heir presumptive to the Thai throne (born 2005)

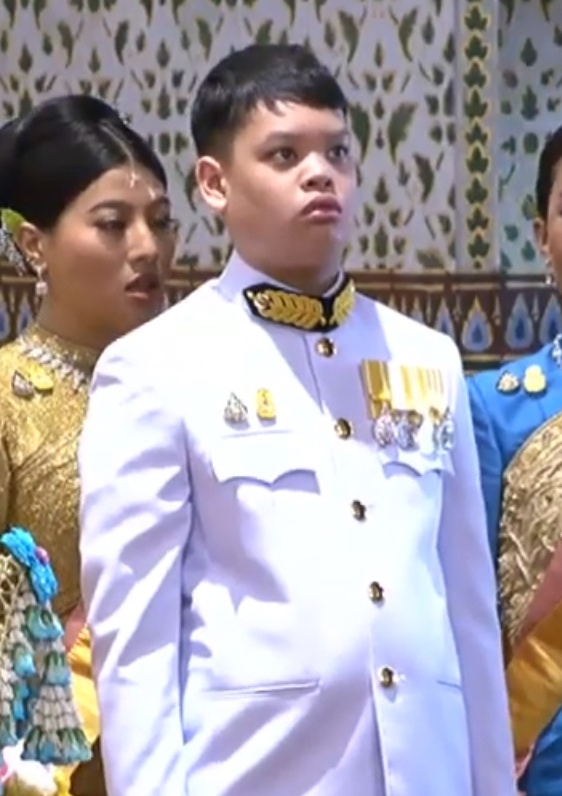
- Dipangkorn in 2019
- Born: 29 April 2005 (age 21); Bangkok, Thailand
Names
- Dipangkorn Rasmijoti Maha Vajirottamangkun Sirivibulyarajakumar
- House: Mahidol
- Dynasty: Chakri
- Father: Vajiralongkorn (Rama X)
- Mother: Srirasmi Suwadee
- Religion: Theravada Buddhism
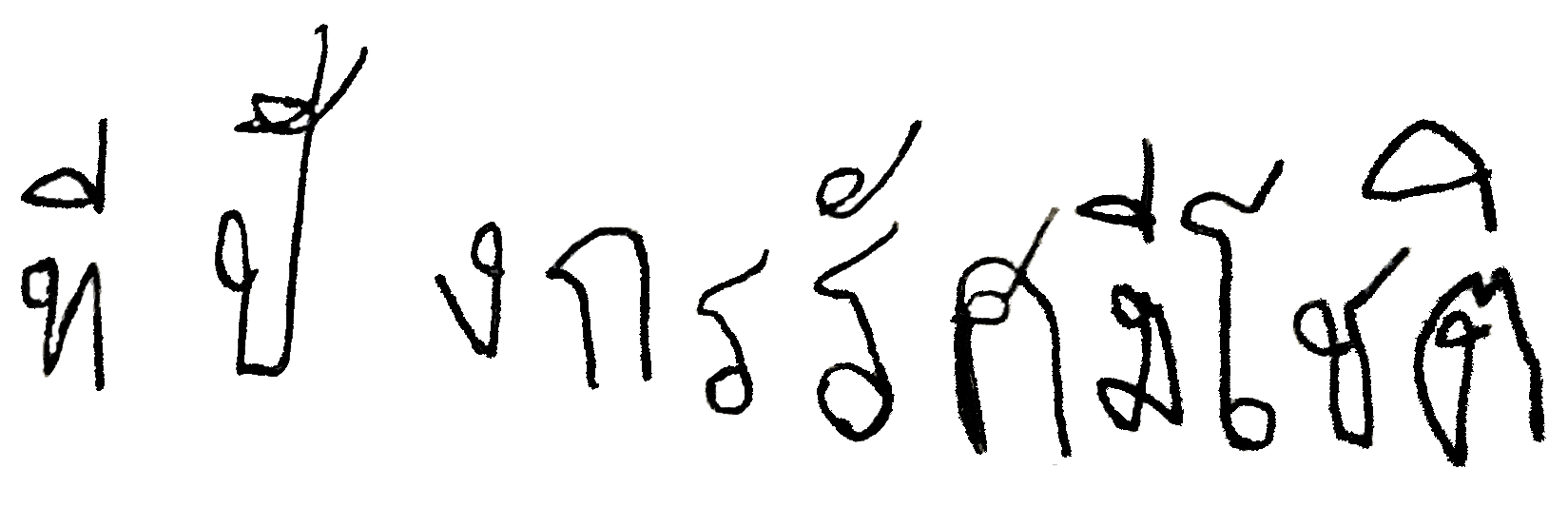
- Signature

Dipangkorn Rasmijoti (Note: (Thai: ทีปังกรรัศมีโชติ; RTGS: Thipangkon Ratsamichot, pronounced [tʰīː.pāŋ.kɔ̄ːn rát.sà.mǐː.tɕʰôːt]) (born 29 April 2005) is the heir presumptive to the throne of Thailand. He is the fifth son and seventh and youngest child of King Vajiralongkorn; his mother is Srirasmi Suwadee, the king's third legal wife. His father also had a daughter by his first wife, and five children (four sons and a daughter) by his second wife who were born out of wedlock but were legitimised by their mother's marriage. After Vajiralongkorn divorced his second wife in 1996, he disowned their four sons, leaving Dipangkorn as his only recognised son. He is believed to have a developmental disorder, but there has been no official confirmation from the royal household.

== Early life and education ==
Prince Dipangkorn Rasmijoti was born by Caesarean section on 29 April 2005 at Siriraj Hospital in Bangkok, during the reign of his grandfather King Bhumibol Adulyadej, who proclaimed the prince's name on 15 June 2005.

The prince is styled His Royal Highness. A royal ceremony, called Phra Ratchaphithi Somphot Duean Lae Khuen Phra U (Thai: พระราชพิธีสมโภชเดือนและขึ้นพระอู่), to celebrate the prince's first month was held on 17 June 2005 at Ananta Samakhom Throne Hall in Bangkok.

Prince Dipangkorn started his education at Chitralada School in Dusit Palace, before going to study abroad at Bavarian International School (BIS) in Bavaria, Germany.

== Position in the line of succession ==
Prince Dipangkorn is the heir presumptive to his father and first in line to the throne as the only officially recognised son of King Vajiralongkorn. However, because of Vajiralongkorn's December 2014 divorce from Srirasmi Suwadee, as well as undisclosed "health problems", Dipangkorn's position in the line of succession is uncertain. He is widely believed by outside observers to be on the autism spectrum with severe learning disabilities, although Thai lèse-majesté law makes it practically impossible to officially confirm. The 1924 Palace Law of Succession lists "the order in the line of succession", following the first-born son of the king to be "the first-born son of the said prince and his royal consort" followed by "younger sons, in order, of the said prince and his royal consort." When Vajiralongkorn ended his relationship with his second wife in 1996, he disowned their four sons and said they had renounced their royal titles. However, the Royal Palace continued to recognise their right to use the style HSH, or His Serene Highness.

Prince Dipangkorn's position is also uncertain, as a 1974 constitutional amendment allows female succession to the throne in the absence of an appointed successor. Princess Bajrakitiyabha, the second presumptive heir in line to the throne based on the 1924 Palace Law of Succession and eldest child of the King, was widely thought to be the next person in line until her death in June 2026.

== Titles, honours and symbols ==
=== Titles and styles ===
Styles of Prince Dipangkorn Rasmijoti
- Reference style: His Royal Highness
- Spoken style: Your Royal Highness

- May 2019 – present: His Royal Highness Prince Dipangkorn Rasmijoti
  - 29 April 2005 – 5 May 2019: (พระเจ้าหลานเธอ พระองค์เจ้าทีปังกรรัศมีโชติ Phra Chao Lanh Ther Phra Ong Chao Dipangkorn Rasmijoti)
  - 5 May 2019 – present: (สมเด็จพระเจ้าลูกยาเธอ เจ้าฟ้าทีปังกรรัศมีโชติ Somdet Phra Chao Luk Ya Ther Chao Fa Dipangkorn Rasmijoti)

Royal decorations

- 2016: King Rama IX Royal Cypher Medal (First Class)
- 2019: Knight of the Most Illustrious Order of the Royal House of Chakri
- 2019: King Rama X Royal Cypher Medal (First Class)
- 2025: Knight Grand Cross of the Most Illustrious Order of Chula Chom Klao
- 2026: King Vajiralongkorn's Court Medal (First Class)

Symbols

Royal monogram of Prince Dipangkorn Rasmijoti

== Notes ==
Dipangkorn Rasmijoti House of Mahidol Cadet branch of the House of Chakri Born: 29 April 2005
Lines of succession
First Heir presumptive	Line of succession to the Thai throne 1st in line	Followed by Princess Sirivannavari
Order of precedence
Preceded by Princess Sirivannavari	Thai order of precedence 8th position	Succeeded by Princess Siribha Chudabhorn
