= Vacharaesorn Vivacharawongse =

Former Thai prince (born 1981)

- วัชเรศร วิวัชรวงศ์
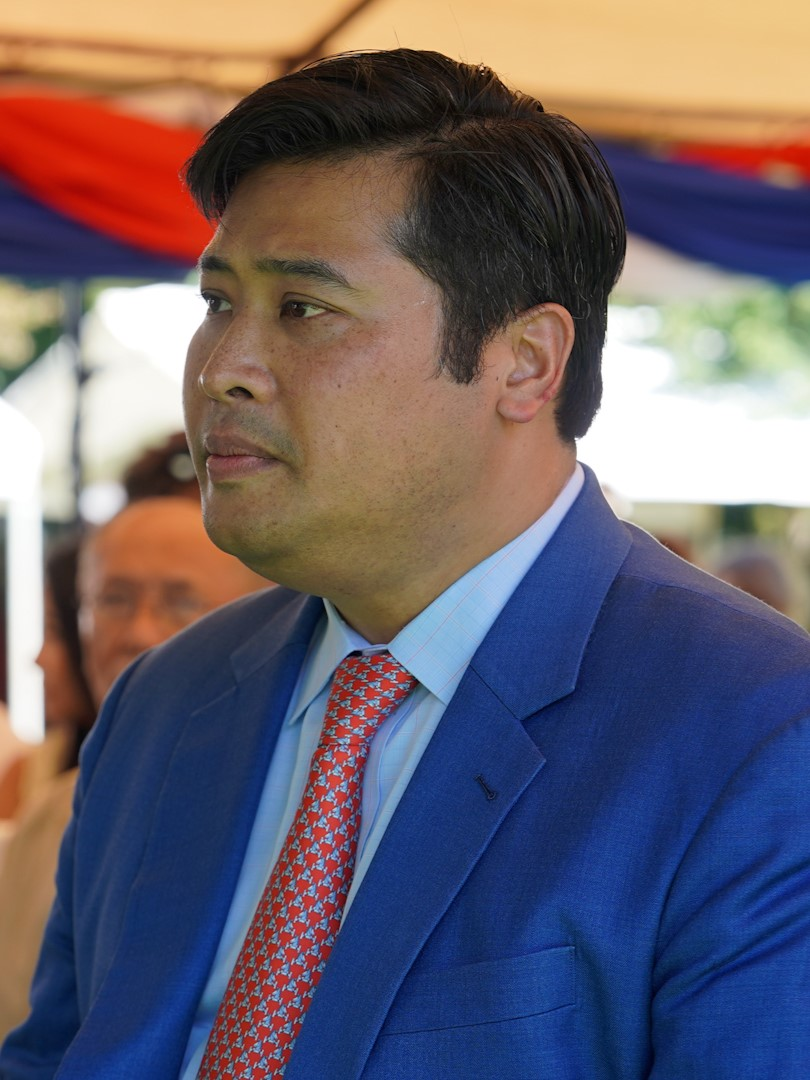
- Vacharaesorn in 2023
- Born: Vacharaesorn Mahidol; 27 May 1981 (age 45); Bangkok, Thailand
- Other name: Than Oun
- Education: Stetson University (BA, JD); George Washington University Law School (LL.M)
- Occupation: Attorney
- Spouse: Elisa Garafano (divorced)
- Children: 2 daughters
- Parents: Vajiralongkorn (Rama X) (father); Sujarinee Vivacharawongse (mother)
- Relatives: Bhumibol Adulyadej (Rama IX) (grandfather)

Vacharaesorn Vivacharawongse (Thai: วัชเรศร วิวัชรวงศ์; RTGS: Watchareson Wiwatcharawong; born 27 May 1981), commonly referred to by Thai media as Than Oun (Thai: ท่านอ้น), is a Thai-American attorney and former member of the Thai royal family. Based in New York, Vivacharawongse is the second son of King Vajiralongkorn and his second wife Sujarinee Vivacharawongse. Banished along with his mother and siblings in 1996, Vacharaesorn briefly returned to Bangkok twice in 2023, and again in 2024, then returned to the United States in 2025.

== Early life and education ==
Vacharaesorn was born on 27 May 1981. He is the second son of King Maha Vajiralongkorn and Sujarinee Vivacharawongse. When he was born, he had the rank of "Mom Chao" as Mom Chao Vacharaesorn Mahidol.

He started his education at Churairat Kindergarten in Bangkok, before attending Chulalongkorn University Demonstration Elementary School from 1987 to 1989, and then Chitralada School. In 1990, he was at Hill House School in Knightsbridge. From 1991 he attended Sunningdale School in Berkshire, where he finished his primary education. Following this, Vacharaesorn and his older brother, Juthavachara, attended Harrow School in London.

Upon his parents' divorce in 1996, Vacharaesorn was stripped of his royal titles and exiled to the United States, along with his mother and brothers. His first jobs in the U.S. were selling hot dogs and vacuum cleaners. After that, he went to study at the Trinity Preparatory School. With an interest in law, he continued his studies earning a BA degree at Stetson University and, in 2006, a JD degree at Stetson University College of Law. He thereafter received an LL.M in International Law from the George Washington University Law School in Washington, DC.

His family home is located in Mount Vernon, New York.

== 2023–2025 returns to Thailand ==
On 6 August 2023, Vacharaesorn returned to Thailand after 27 years of exile on an unannounced visit, arriving in Bangkok at Suvarnabhumi airport. On 10 August, he visited several sites around Bangkok, as well as paying tribute to his ancestor Nangklao. The arrival of his younger brother on 12 August, Chakriwat Vivacharawongse, caused him to postpone his departure back to the United States scheduled for 13 August. Together with his brother, they visited Phra Nakhon Si Ayuthaya province on 12 August and Siriraj Hospital in Bangkok on 13 August. They also visited Ariyavongsagatanana, the Supreme Patriarch of Thailand at Wat Ratchabophit.

He returned again back to Thailand in 2023 on 4 December to mark Father's Day. In Thailand, Father's Day is marked on 5 December to honour the birthday of his grandfather Bhumibol Adulyadej, and Vacharaesorn paid respect to him in Bangkok. Vacharaesorn had also received his first Thai identification card and applied for a Thai passport. On 16 December, he participated in a mangrove reforestration project in Samut Songkhram province. He left Thailand on 19 December.

On 6 March 2024, he returned to Thailand for the third time in seven months as a Thai citizen with a Thai passport. On 12 March, he made a visit to the Kanchanaburi Provincial Deaf School. He has also made visits to Siam Paragon, and locations in Chiang Mai, Kanchanaburi, Khon Kaen, Nakhon Phanom, Nakhon Sawan and Nonthaburi provinces. For his 2024 visit, he has said that he plans to stay in Thailand until after Songkran.

In an interview with the Bangkok Post on 21 March, which was the first media outlet he visited in Thailand, Vacharaesorn said that he wished to permanently reside in Thailand. When asked by the Bangkok Post on if his return visits had a purpose, he said, "I only wanted to return to my homeland. This is the feeling of a person who left over 27 years ago."

Vacharaesorn was ordained as a Buddhist monk on 11 May 2025. The ordination ceremony was held on Vesak Day in Bangkok.

On 23 June 2025, he was detained from the Buddhist temple Wat Pariwat Ratchasongkram and escorted on a flight back to the US. It was reported in Time magazine that "the perception among analysts was that Vacharaesorn was striving to thread the needle as a compromise candidate for succession," although he "has steadfastly denied any desire for the throne."

== Careers ==
Vacharaesorn's first job was as a concessionaire for NASCAR-owned circuits, primarily the Daytona International Speedway, in central Florida where he was attending school in 1996.

In addition to regular work, he has established the Thai Heritage Scholarship Fund of New York for Thai students in New York City to encourage Thai students born or educated abroad to remember their home country and make a contribution to the nation.

Vacharaesorn is the chairman and founding senior partner of newly incorporated, Bangkok-based legal consulting firm, VVV Group. Vacharaesorn was shown using the title "Prince" to promote his involvement in the firm, which was later removed after accusations of attempting to monetize a semi-royal status.

== Political and cultural interest ==
Vacharaesorn has been a notable promoter of Buddhist and Thai art and culture within the United States, participating in various activities to promote Thai culture in Los Angeles and New York. During the COVID-19 pandemic on 4 April 2020, he encouraged the Thai government to implement policies to support people affected by the pandemic. On 6 August 2023, he posted pictures of his meeting with former German president, Christian Wulff.

Vacharaesorn has been supportive of the Thai monarchy. Following his visit to a New York exhibition, he has called for open discussion on the nation's stringent laws against insulting the royal family.

On 8 December 2023, he visited Surao Kae Rai School, an Islamic elementary school in Bang Nam Priao district of Chachoengsao province, to grant scholarships to students.

=== Succession ===
Since before Princess Bajrakitiyabha's death, Vajiralongkorn has been under pressure to resolve the succession deadlock. In Thailand, the monarch designates their successor, something Vajiralongkorn has not done. Stripped of his royal titles, Vacharaesorn is not currently in the line of succession, but some believe he will be selected to fill the succession vacuum.

In March 2024, The Daily Beast published an article claiming that Vacharaesorn was married to American civil servant Elisa Garafano and had two children with her. Succession laws in Thailand states that royals “shall be excluded from the line of succession” if they are “married to a foreign consort." In 2024, Vacharaesorn said in public that he divorced Garafano, but a source states they're still legally married.

Vacharaesorn Vivacharawongse House of Vivacharawongse Cadet branch of the House of Mahidol Born: 27 May 1981
Order of precedence
Preceded by Juthavachara Vivacharawongse	Thai order of precedence 24th position	Succeeded by Chakriwat Vivacharawongse
