= Bajrakitiyabha =

Thai princess (1978–2026)

- Princess Rajasarini Siribajra
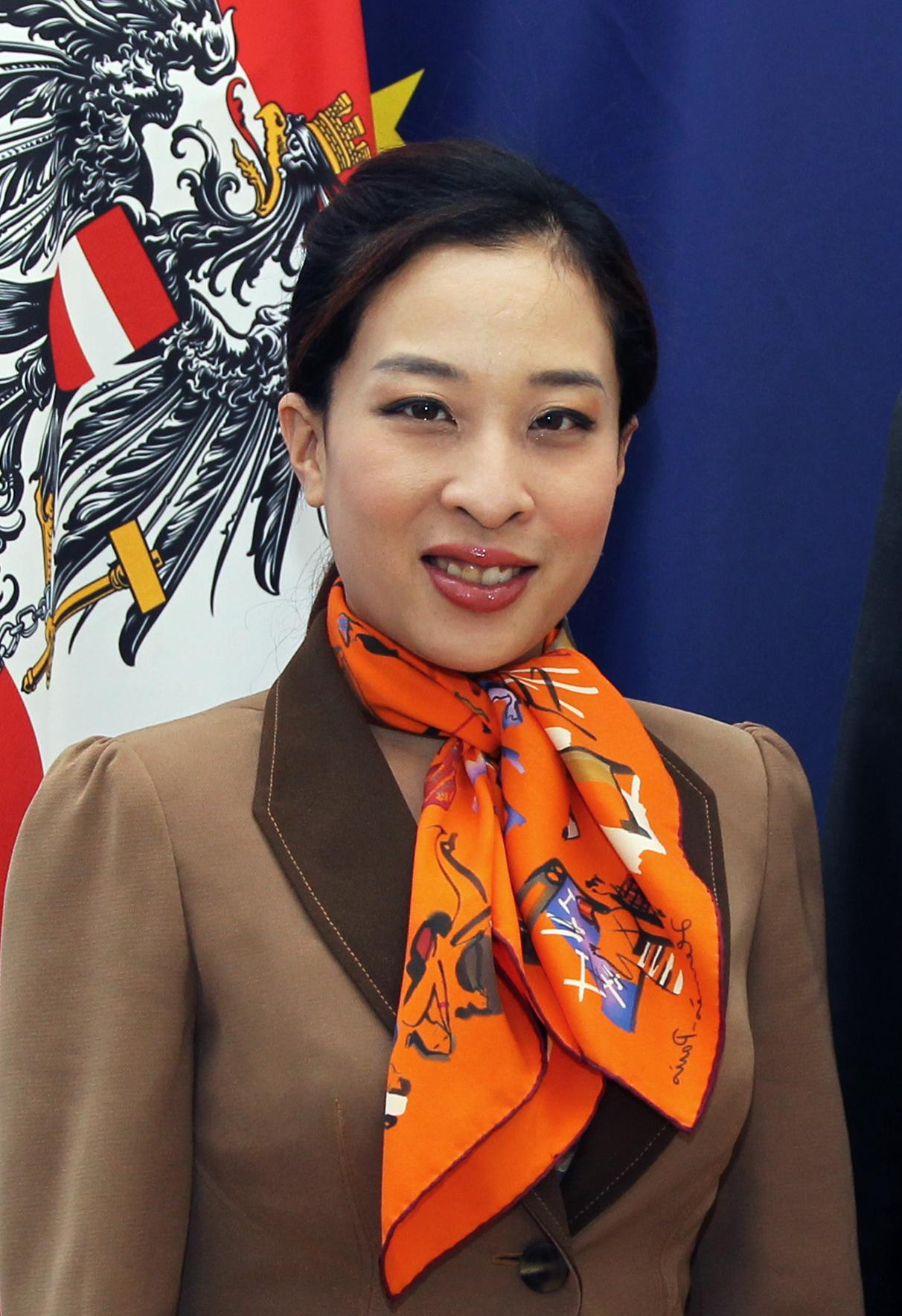
- HRH Princess Bajrakitiyabha of Thailand
- Born: 7 December 1978; Bangkok, Thailand
- Died: 11 June 2026 (aged 47); Bangkok, Thailand
Names
- Bajrakitiyabha Narendira Debyavati
- House: Mahidol
- Dynasty: Chakri
- Father: Vajiralongkorn (Rama X)
- Mother: Soamsawali Kitiyakara
- Religion: Theravada Buddhism
- Occupation: Ambassador; attorney
- Education: Sukhothai Thammathirat Open University (B.A.); Thammasat University (LL.B.); Cornell University (LL.M., J.S.D.)

Ambassador of Thailand to Austria, Slovakia, and Slovenia
- In office 4 September 2012 – 1 October 2014
- Nominated by: Yingluck Shinawatra
- Prime Minister: Yingluck Shinawatra; Niwatthamrong Boonsongpaisan (acting); Prayut Chan-o-cha
- Preceded by: Somsak Suriyawong
- Succeeded by: Attayut Srisamut
- Military career
- Allegiance: Kingdom of Thailand
- Branch: Royal Thai Army; Royal Security Command
- Service years: 2021–2022
- Rank: General
- Commands: 4th Infantry Battalion, 1st Infantry Regiment; Royal Security Command

Bajrakitiyabha, Princess Rajasarini Siribajra (Note: Thai: พัชรกิติยาภา นเรนทิราเทพยวดี กรมหลวงราชสาริณีสิริพัชร มหาวัชรราชธิดา, RTGS: Phatchara Kitiyapha Narenthira Thepphayawadi, Kromma Luang Rajasarini Siriphat Mahawatchara Ratchathida) (7 December 1978 – 11 June 2026), also known as Princess Bha, (Note: Thai: พระองค์ภา, องค์ภา) was the eldest child of King Vajiralongkorn of Thailand and the only one born to his first wife Princess Soamsawali. Born during the reign of her grandfather, King Bhumibol Adulyadej, she was his and queen Sirikit's eldest grandchild.

A professional attorney, Bajrakitiyabha was known for her work that focused on incarcerated Thai women and their children, to ensure they are given adequate assistance to reenter Thai society upon release. Bajrakitiyabha was crucial in the United Nations implementation of the "Bangkok Rules", which became the first set of international guidelines addressing the treatment of women in the incarceration system. These efforts made her popular among the Thai public and cemented her as a potential heir to the throne. As a diplomat, she also served as an ambassador of Thailand to Austria, Slovakia, and Slovenia in the government of Yingluck Shinawatra.

On 14 December 2022, Bajrakitiyabha collapsed as a result of a heart condition while out walking her dogs. After a coma lasting three and a half years, she died on 11 June 2026 without regaining consciousness, following a series of complications. Her condition created uncertainty regarding the Thai line of succession as she was seen as a likely successor to her father.

== Early life and education ==
Bajrakitiyabha was born on 7 December 1978 at Amphorn Sathan Residential Hall of the Dusit Palace, in Bangkok. She was the eldest child and first daughter of Vajiralongkorn and his first wife princess Soamsawali. Bajrakitiyabha was the only child given the title of Kromma Luang, the 3rd level of the Krom ranks by her father. She was the Princess Rajasarini Siribajra (Krom Luang Rajasarini Siribajra).

Bajrakitiyabha studied at the all-girls Rajini School when she was in elementary and junior high school. She moved to England and began her secondary education at Heathfield School in Ascot. She subsequently finished her secondary education at the Chitralada School within Dusit Palace. She returned to Thailand, and received both an Bachelor of Arts in international relations from Sukhothai Thammatirat Open University and a Bachelor of Laws from Thammasat University, both in 2000. She moved to the United States where she obtained a Master of Laws and a Doctor of Juridical Science from Cornell University in 2002 and 2005 respectively. Her doctorate thesis was titled "Towards equal justice: Protection of the rights of the accused in the Thai criminal justice process. A comparison with France and the United States." At Cornell, she used the name Patty.

== Career ==
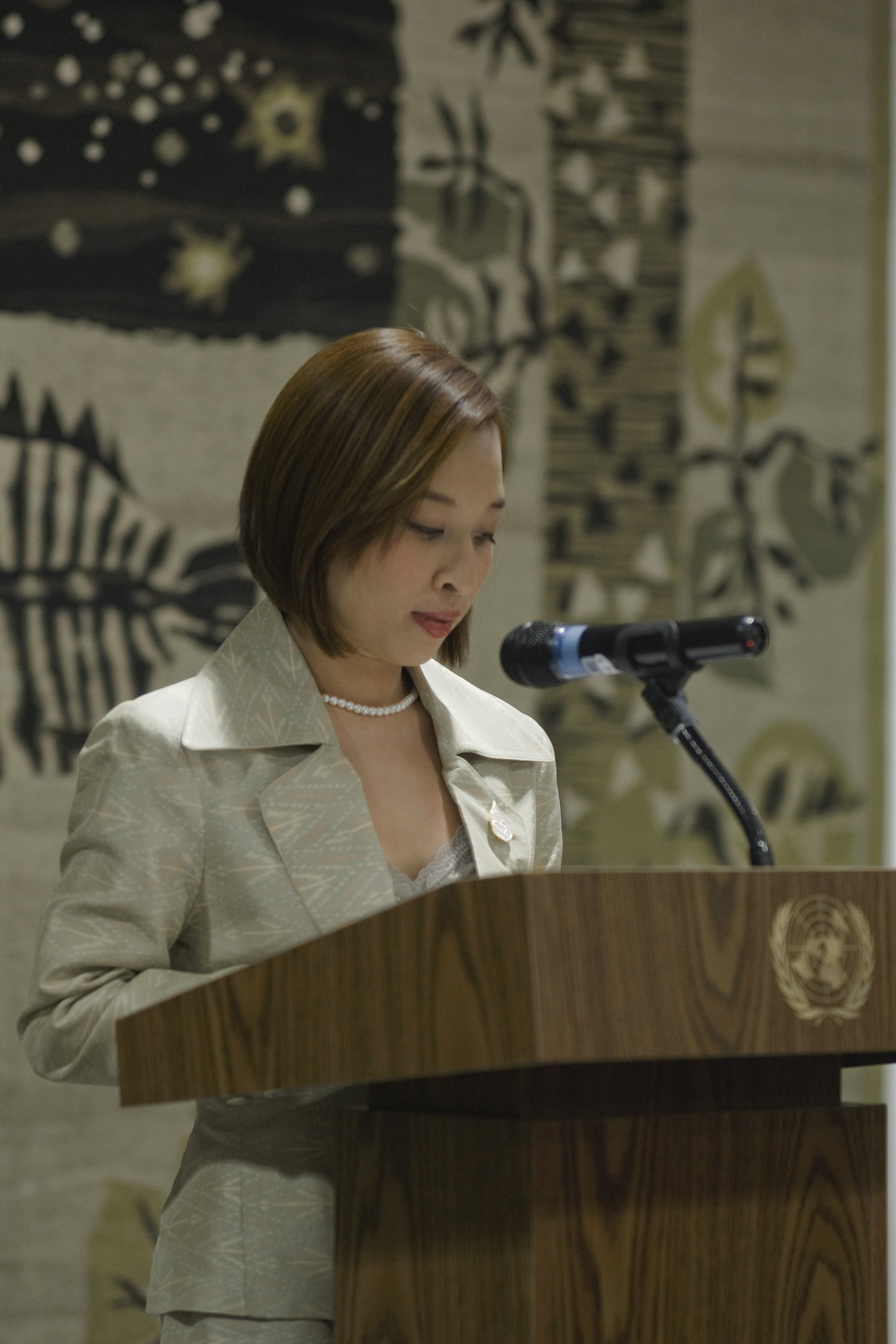
Princess Bajrakitiyabha at Headquarters of the United Nations in 2010

In 1995, Bajrakitiyabha founded the Puen Pheng (Bha) Yamyark Foundation (Thai: มูลนิธิเพื่อนพื่ง (ภา) ยามยาก, lit. "(Bha) Helping Friends In Need Foundation") under association of the Thai Red Cross Society, first to provide humanitarian aid for natural disasters. She served as the foundation's president until her death.

In 2002, she was a summer legal intern at Baker McKenzie's Washington, D.C. office. On completion of her legal education, Princess Bajrakitiyabha worked briefly at the Thai Permanent Mission to the United Nations in New York before returning to Thailand. In September 2006, she was appointed Attorney in the Office of the Attorney General in Bangkok and was then appointed to Office of the Attorney General of Udon Thani Province.

From 2012 to 2014, during the government of Yingluck Shinawatra, she served as ambassador to Austria, Slovenia and Slovakia until she returned to a post at the Office of the Attorney General.

In 2017, Bajrakitiyabha was appointed as the goodwill ambassador for the rule of law in Southeast Asia by the United Nations Commission on Crime Prevention and Criminal Justice.

On 3 February 2021, the princess was transferred from her position as an attorney in the Office of the Attorney General to the Royal Security Command in the position of Chief of Staff of The King's Close Bodyguard Command and bestowed the rank of general.

=== Work on women in the penal system ===
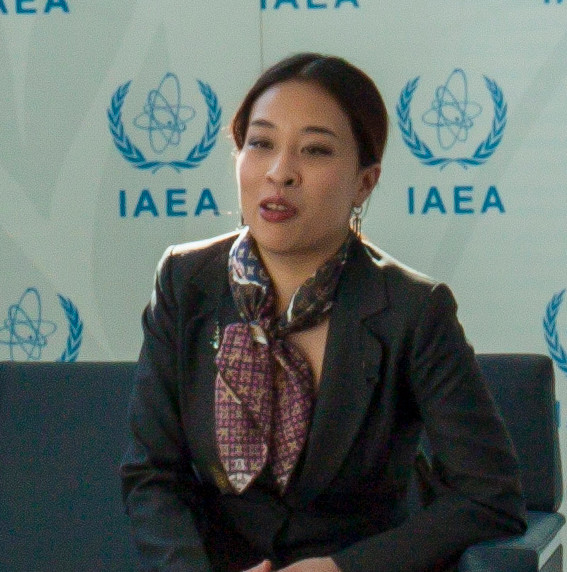
Bajrakitiyabha in Austria in 2013

The princess was instrumental in prodding the Thai government to submit a resolution to the Commission on Crime Prevention and Criminal Justice, a subsidiary body of the UN Economic and Social Council, that detailed the vulnerability of women incarcerated in a system built principally for men. Her efforts were to lead to the United Nations' adoption of the "Bangkok Rules", the first set of universal guidelines addressing the treatment of women in the justice system.

Bajrakitiyabha ran the "Kamlangjai" or "Inspire" project, which reaches out to incarcerated Thai women, including pregnant inmates and their babies, and intends to ensure that those female and pregnant inmates are given adequate assistance to prepare them to reenter society upon release. She also worked on "Enhancing lives of Female Inmates" (ELFI), a project which proposes new rules for the treatment of women prisoners and non-custodial measures for women offenders as a supplement to the 1955 Standard Minimum Rules for the Treatment of Prisoners (SMRTP). Because of her Kamlangjai project, Bajrakitiyabha was noted as an influential legal advocate and became popular among the Thai public. Some analysts noted that this set her apart from other royals, as they were seen as distant from the Thai people.

== Illness and death ==
Announcement of the Bureau of the Royal Household concerning the death of Bajrakitiyabha

On 14 December 2022, Bajrakitiyabha was hospitalised after collapsing while out walking her dogs in Nakhon Ratchasima. The Bureau of the Royal Household announced the following day that the episode was due to a severely irregular heartbeat caused by a mycoplasma infection in her heart, a bacterial infection usually associated with pneumonia. She had been training her dogs for the Thailand Working Dog Championship 2022 organised by the Royal Thai Army. Bajrakitiyabha was initially taken to Pak Chong Nana Hospital and then transferred to the King Chulalongkorn Memorial Hospital in Bangkok.

On 19 December, the Bureau of the Royal Household subsequently announced that Bajrakitiyabha's heart, lung and kidney functions were being supported by equipment and that her condition was "stable at a certain level". Her father's New Year's greeting card for 2023 showed him and Queen Suthida garbed in somber black, which some noted spoke to the severity of Bajrakitiyabha's condition.

As the first official update regarding her condition since 2023, the Bureau of the Royal Household announced in August 2025 that Bajrakitiyabha had been diagnosed with a severe bloodstream infection; doctors had to administer antibiotics to keep her blood pressure stable. She was still supported by equipment for her lung and kidney functions. In October 2025, her grandmother, Queen Sirikit, died at the same hospital where Bajrakitiyabha was being treated.

In May 2026, Bajrakitiyabha developed a stomach infection, which caused her blood pressure to drop. Her condition later worsened as she developed colitis, low blood pressure, arrhythmias and blood clotting disorders. Bajrakitiyabha died on 11 June at 7:48 p.m. ICT, at the age of 47. Her death was announced by the Bureau of the Royal Household the following day.

=== Aftermath and funeral ===
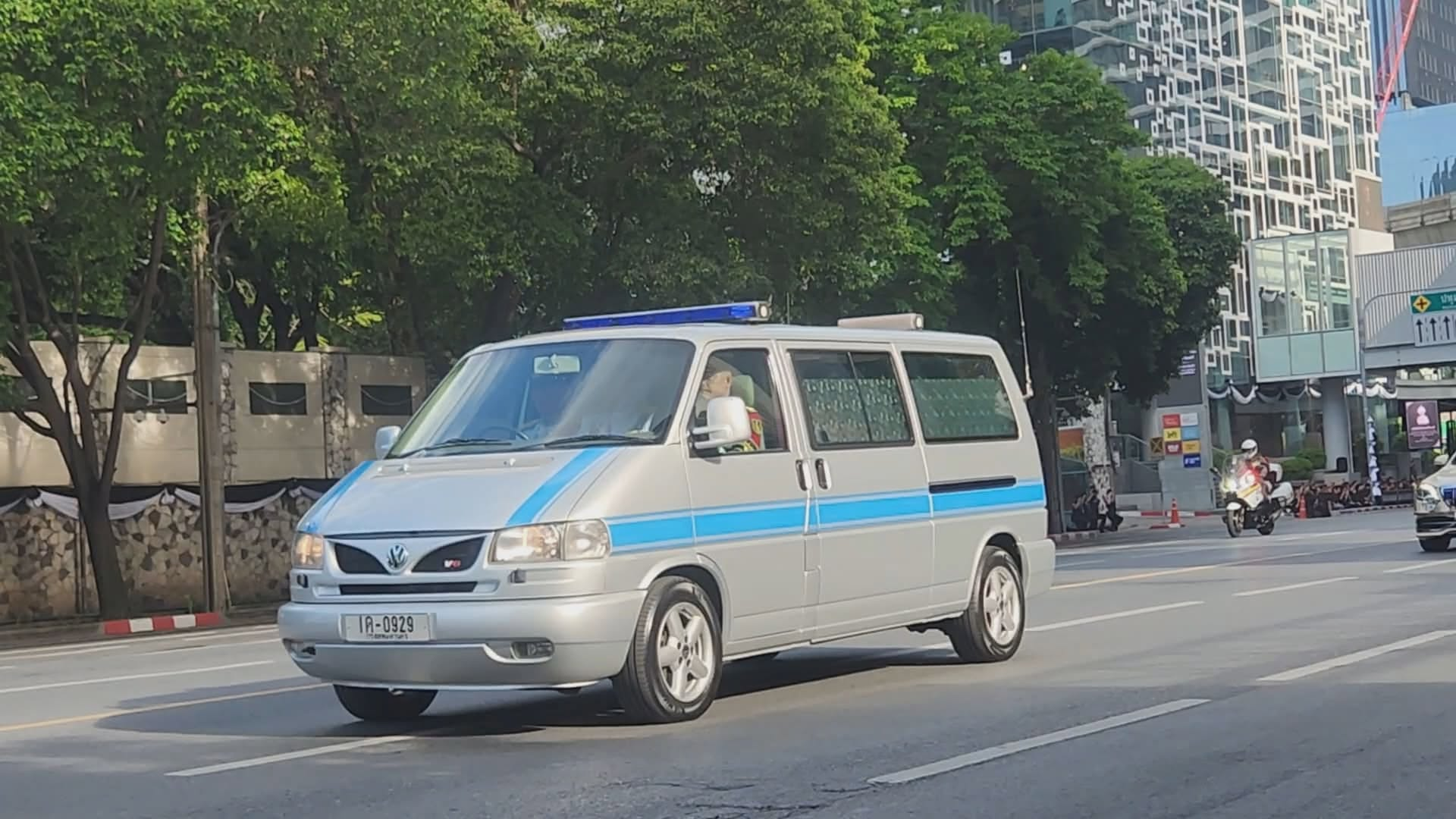
Bajrakitiyabha's funeral hearse being driven from King Chulalongkorn Memorial Hospital to the Grand Palace

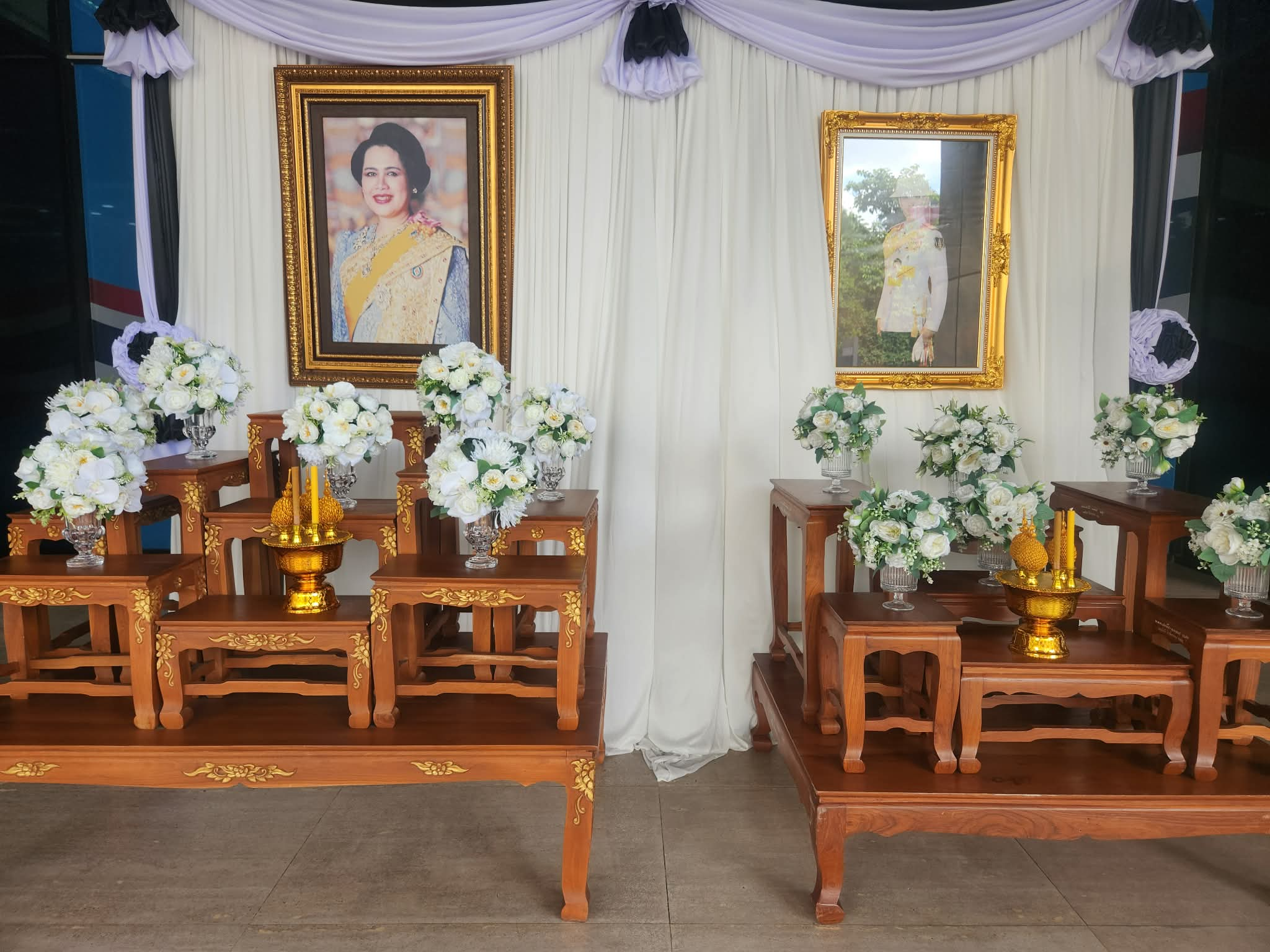
Mourning altars for Queen Mother Sirikit and Princess Bajrakitiyabha set up by a Thai government agency

In a televised speech, Prime Minister Anutin Charnvirakul called Bajrakitiyabha "a pride of Thailand" and said that her work will remain "a moral legacy for the nation, a guiding light for generations of Thais". The Nikkei described Bajrakitiyabha's death as "one of the greatest tragedies in the Chakri dynasty".

The government declared fifteen days of national mourning. Mourners gathered outside King Chulalongkorn Memorial Hospital. News websites switched to black and white while bus-ticket collectors wore black ribbon pins. Her funeral procession was on 13 June, starting with the transfer of her remains from the hospital to the Piman Rattaya Throne Hall in the Grand Palace. Later, King Vajiralongkorn and Queen Suthida led the Buddhist funeral rites for Bajrakitiyabha. Public participation included Buddhist water-pouring rituals before Bajrakitiyabha's portrait.

Her cremation is scheduled for February 2027.

== Role in succession ==
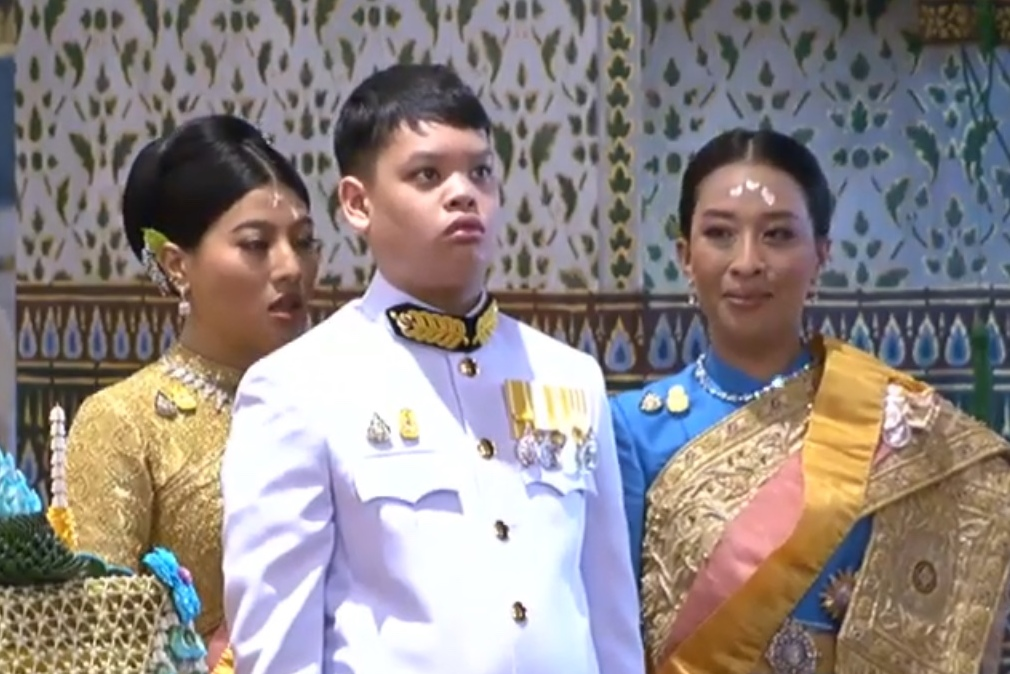
Bajrakitiyabha (right) with her siblings, Sirivannavari Nariratana (left) and Dipangkorn Rasmijoti (center) in 2019.

Until her comatose state in 2022, Bajrakitiyabha was considered to be a potential candidate to succeed King Vajiralongkorn and potentially become Thailand's first queen regnant; her illness and death subsequently left the line of succession unclear. The BBC described her as playing a "pivotal role" in the succession question. While Prince Dipangkorn Rasmijoti, King Vajiralongkorn's youngest child, is heir presumptive due to males taking precedence in Thailand's line of succession and because Vajiralongkorn had disowned his four other sons from his previous marriage to Sujarinee Vivacharawongse, his learning disability and Bajrakitiyabha's public service career prompted speculation that she was set to hold an important role in any future succession. She was also speculated to be a potential regent for Dipangkorn.

Thai scholar Pavin Chachavalpongpun noted that Bajrakitiyabha's illness was likely to create a royal succession crisis as she was "widely assumed" to succeed to the throne. The New York Times speculated that Bajrakitiyabha would have been able to "restore respect" to the monarchy amid its growing unpopularity.

== Legacy ==
Bajrakitiyabha was noted for her legal and philanthropic work in Thailand. Her justice reform efforts through her Kamlangjai or "Inspire" project were said to have helped rehabilitate female convicts in the country. Her efforts led to the United Nations General Assembly adopting the "Bangkok Rules" on care and conditions for female prisoners worldwide. Philippine president Bongbong Marcos said that Bajrakitiyabha's social reforms created an "enduring legacy" that will be remembered by Thailand and "admired by the international community". CNN said that Bajrakitiyabha's efforts "improved the livelihoods of female prisoners" in the country. Her efforts were also a main factor for the Thai government to submit a resolution to the Commission on Crime Prevention and Criminal Justice that argued that women were vulnerable in a male-dominated prison system.

The New York Times highlighted Bajrakitiyabha's popularity among the public as a crucial figure to stabilize the "wave of disillusionment" between the Thai monarchy and the public. Academic Kasidit Ananthanathorn opined that Bajrakitiyabha was the monarchy's "hope [to] carry the royal family into the future".

== Titles, styles, and honours ==
Styles of: Princess Bajrakitiyabha; Princess Rajasirini Siribajra
- Reference style: Her Royal Highness
- Spoken style: Your Royal Highness

On 12 May 2012, she was awarded an honorary LL.D. degree from the Chicago-Kent College of Law.

Title and Styles

- 7 December 1978 - 5 May 2019 : Her Royal Highness Princess Bajrakitiyabha
- 5 May 2019 - 28 July 2019 : Her Royal Highness Princess Bajrakitiyabha Narendiradebyavati
- 28 July 2019 - 11 June 2026 : Her Royal Highness Princess Bajrakitiyabha Narendiradebyavati, Princess Rajasarini Siribajra

=== National honours ===
- Dame of the The Most Illustrious Order of the Royal House of Chakri (2019)
- Dame of the Ancient and Auspicious Order of the Nine Gems (2019)
- Dame Grand Cross of the Order of Chula Chom Klao, First Class (1991)
- Dame Grand Cordon of the Order of the White Elephant (2005)
- Dame Grand Cordon of the Order of the Crown of Thailand (1996)
- Dame Grand Cross of the Order of the Direkgunabhorn (1995)
- Member of the Order of Symbolic Propitiousness Ramkeerati
- King Rama IX Royal Cypher Medal, First Class (1984)
- King Vajiralongkorn's Royal Cypher Medal
- Chakra Mala Medal – Medal for Long Service and Good Conduct (Military and Police) (2025)

The ribbons worn regularly by Bajrakitiyabha in undress uniform are as follows

=== Foreign honours ===
Austria: Grand Decoration of Honour in Gold with Sash for Services to the Republic of Austria (7 October 2014)

=== Symbols ===
Royal monogram of Princess Bajrakitiyabha

Royal flag of Princess Bajrakitiyabha
