= Sirivannavari =

Thai princess and fashion designer (born 1987)

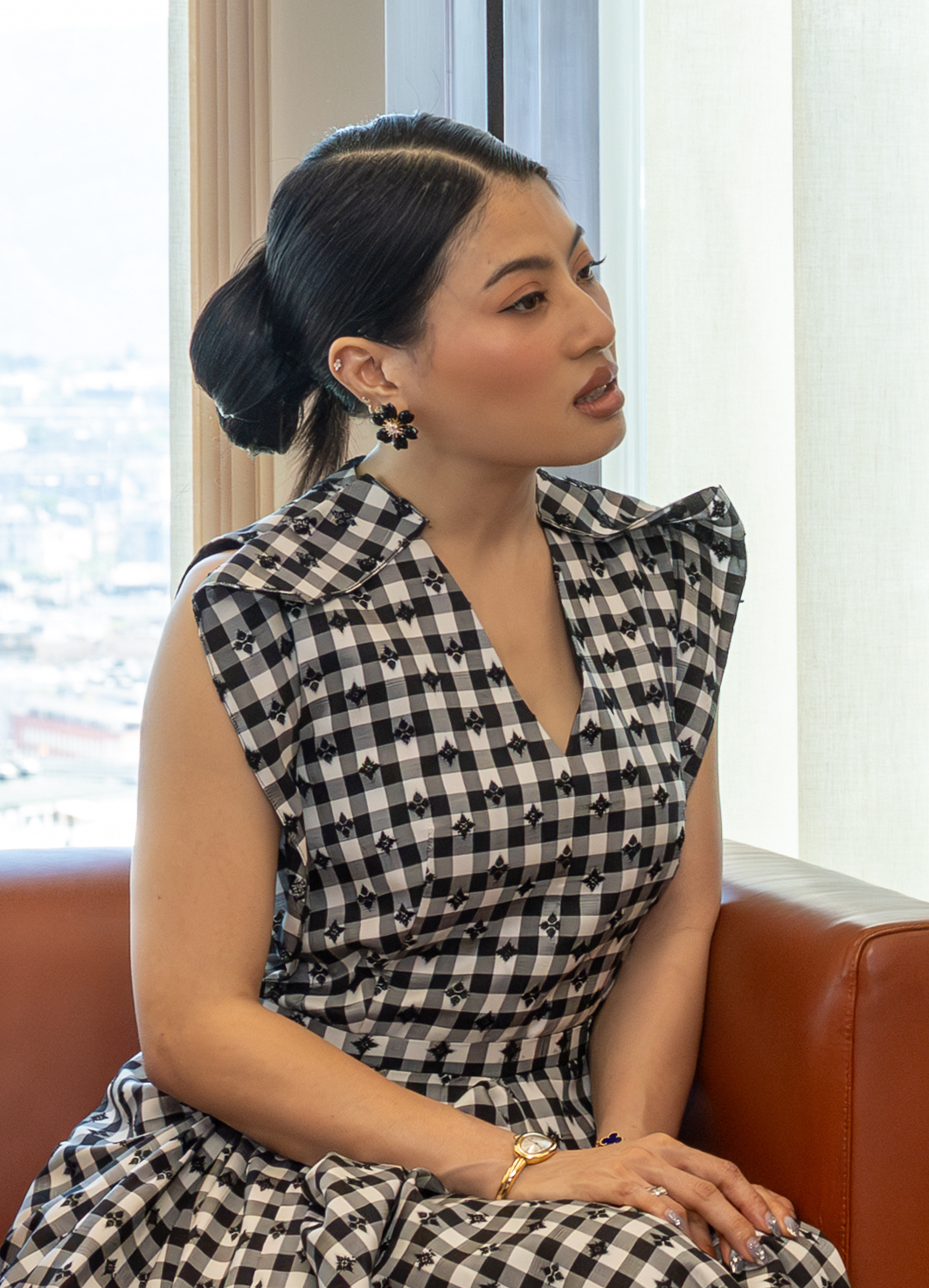
- Sirivannavari in 2026
- Born: Busyanambejra Mahidol; 8 January 1987 (age 39); Bangkok, Thailand
Names
- Sirivannavari Nariratana Rajakanya
- House: Mahidol
- Dynasty: Chakri
- Father: Vajiralongkorn (Rama X)
- Mother: Yuvadhida Polpraserth
- Religion: Theravada Buddhism
- Occupation: Fashion designer; athlete
- Sports career
Medal record
Badminton
Representing Thailand
SEA Games
Gold medal – first place	2005 Manila	Women's team
Bronze medal – third place	2007 Nakhon Ratchasima	Women's team
Equestrian
Representing Thailand
SEA Games
Silver medal – second place	2017 Kuala Lumpur	Team dressage

Sirivannavari (Note: (Thai: สิริวัณณวรี นารีรัตนราชกัญญา; Thai pronunciation: [sì.rì.wān.wá(ʔ).riː.]; RTGS: Siriwanwari Narirat Ratchakanya) (Note: Princess Sirivannavari does not normally use a surname, but when one is required, it may be Mahidol, but in 2017 SEA Games, Sirivannavari used the surname Vajiralongkorn.) (born 8 January 1987) is a Thai princess and the second daughter of King Vajiralongkorn by his former consort Sujarinee Vivacharawongse (commonly known as Yuvadhida Polpraserth). She is also the only one of their children in the line of succession and to bear royal titles. She has produced works as a fashion designer, and competed in sports as an equestrian and badminton player.

== Early life and education ==
Sirivannavari was born Mom Chao Busyanambejra Mahidol (Thai: บุษย์น้ำเพชร มหิดล; Thai pronunciation: [bùt.nám.pʰét má(ʔ).hì.dōn]; RTGS: Butnamphet Mahidon), but later changed to Mom Chao Chakkrityapha Mahidol (Thai: จักรกฤษณ์ยาภา มหิดล), and once again to Mom Chao Sirivanvari Mahidol (Thai: สิริวัณวรี มหิดล) upon order of Queen Sirikit. She has four full siblings. Following her parents' divorce in 1996, her mother moved with her siblings to the United Kingdom; her father then ordered Sirivannavari's abduction and return to Thailand.

Her title name is Her Royal Highness Princess Sirivannavari.

Sirivannavari graduated with a Bachelor of Arts degree from Chulalongkorn University and a master's in design from Ecole de la Chambre Syndicale de la Couture Parisienne. She was elevated to Princess status by royal command of her grandfather, King Bhumibol Adulyadej, on 15 June 2005.

== Career ==
Sirivannavari has been appointed as a specialist in the Royal Thai Army with the rank of major general, according to the royal gazette. King Maha Vajiralongkorn announced the appointment of his daughter in the latest round of military promotions that became in effect on 1 April 2023. Sirivannavari was the patron of the Royal Stable Unit of the 2nd Cavalry Division, King's Guard, Royal Thai Army.

In June 2026, Sirivannavari participated in two important Thai Royal Family events. On June 26, she participated in official Royal mourning events for the demise of the Princess Bajrakitiyabha, which included gifting 47 saffron robes to Buddhist monks and other formal religious ceremonies. She also participated in an official visit to France, with their Majesties the King and Queen, to commemorate 170 years of France–Thailand relations, arriving at Paris Orly Airport on June 28. In France, she met President Emmanuel Macron and Mrs. Macron. Notably, she walked directly behind The Queen, and in front of all other dignitaries, which indicated her high position in the order of precedence.

=== Sports ===
Sirivannavari represented Thailand in badminton at the 2005 Southeast Asian Games in the Philippines, winning a team gold. In this, she follows in the footsteps of her grandfather, King Bhumibol Adulyadej, who represented his country in international sailing events. A badminton tournament that made its debut in 2016, the Thailand Masters, bears her name.

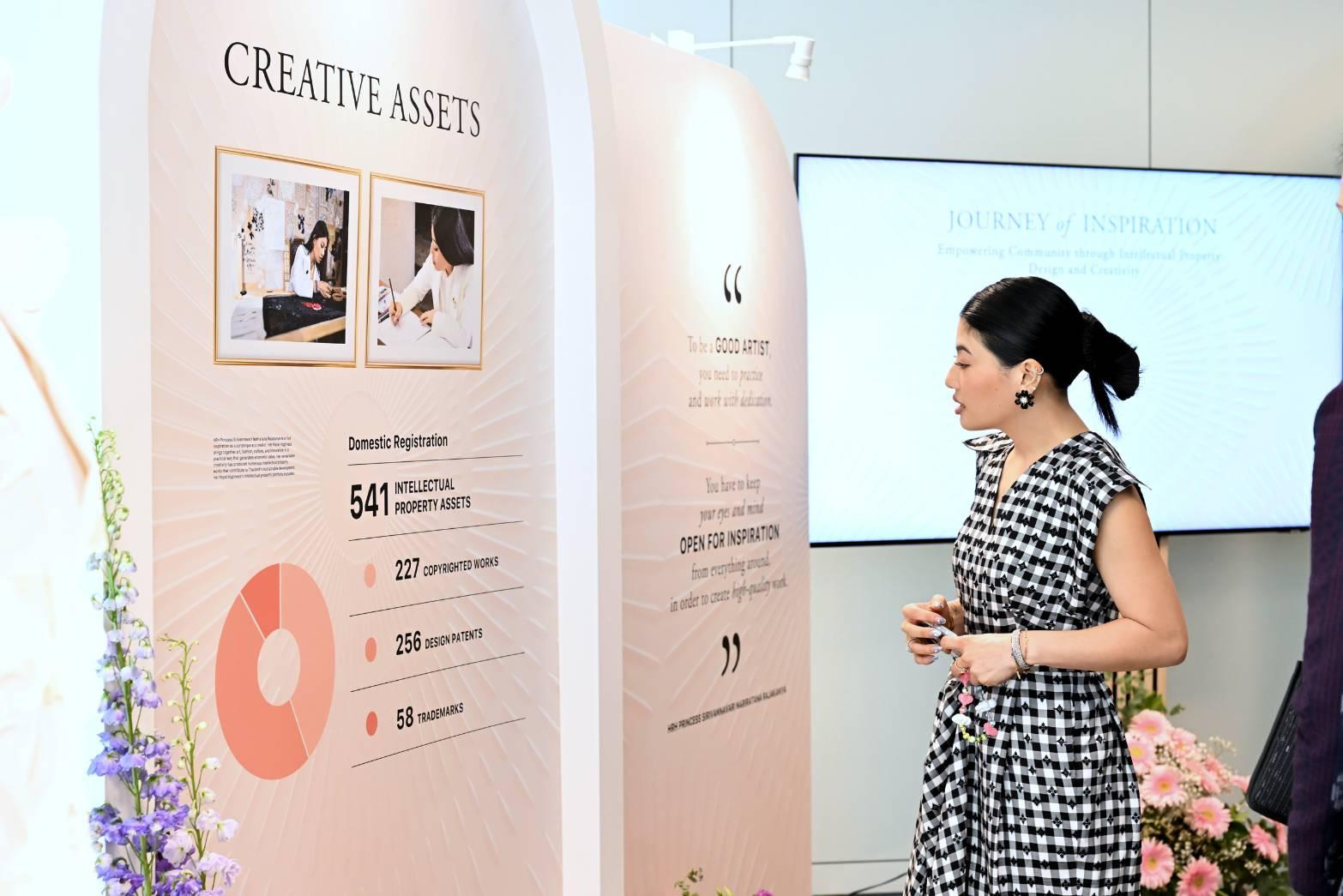
Princess Sirivannavari at WIPO in May 2026

In 2007, Sirivannavari began riding horses at age nine. She trained in France at the International Moniteur d'Equitation, Le Cadre Noir de Saumur. She competed as a member of the Thai equestrian sports team in the 2013 and 2017 SEA Games.

=== Fashion design ===
Sirivannavari was invited by Balmain, a French luxury fashion house, to present her fashion show in Paris. Her debut Paris collection was titled Presence of the Past, which drew on memories of her royal grandmother as well as giving a modern interpretation to traditional Thai costume. The following year, she presented her own fashion show in Paris. She designed a dress worn by Sophida Kanchanarin, Thailand's representative in the Miss Universe 2018 pageant. YouTube personality Wanchaleom Jamneanphol, known online as Mixy Bigmouth, was subsequently threatened with prosecution under Thailand's lèse-majesté laws after describing the dress as ugly.

Sirivannavari was appointed as WIPO Ambassador for Fashion and Design on May 28, 2026 by WIPO Director General Daren Tang, for her contributions to creativity, innovation and strategic IP use. Her Royal Highness holds over 500 intellectual property assets including 256 designs, 275 copyright registrations and registered trademarks in 34 countries for jewelry, leather goods and home decor.

== Styles, honours and symbols ==
Title and styles

- 8 January 1987 – around 1997 : Her Serene Highness Princess Busyanambejra Mahidol
- Around 1997 : Her Serene Highness Princess Chakrakrishnayabha Mahidol
- Around 1997 – 15 June 2005 : Her Serene Highness Princess Sirivanvari Mahidol
- 15 June 2005 – 5 May 2019 : Her Royal Highness Princess Sirivannavari Nariratana
- 5 May 2019 – present : Her Royal Highness Princess Sirivannavari Nariratana Rajakanya

=== National honours ===
- Knight of the Most Illustrious Order of the Royal House of Chakri (2019)
- Dame Grand Cross of the Most Illustrious Order of Chula Chom Klao (2000)
- Knight Grand Cordon of the Most Exalted Order of the White Elephant (2008)
- Knight Grand Cordon of the Most Noble Order of the Crown of Thailand (2005)
- Knight Grand Cross of the Most Admirable Order of the Direkgunabhorn (2006)
- King Rama IX Royal Cypher Medal, First Class (1999)
- King Rama X Royal Cypher Medal, First Class (2019)

=== Foreign honours ===
- Hungary :
  - Grand Officer of the Hungarian Order of Merit (Civil Division) (19 March 2024)
- France :
  - Grand Officer of the Legion of Honour (26 January 2026)
- Italy :
  - Grand Cross of the Order of Merit of the Italian Republic (20 October 2026)

=== Appointments ===
- WIPO Ambassador for Fashion and Design (28 May 2026)

=== Honorary degrees ===
- Chulalongkorn University – honorary Doctorate in Fine and Applied Arts, in recognition of her design skill, advocacy of Thai craftsmanship, and her high-end fashion brand, Sirivannavari (1 October 2020)

=== Styles and symbols ===
Styles of Princess Sirivannavari of Thailand
- Reference style: Her Royal Highness
- Spoken style: Your Royal Highness

Royal monogram of Princess Sirivannavari

Royal flag of Princess Sirivannavari

== See also ==
- Badminton at the 2005 Southeast Asian Games

Sirivannavari House of Mahidol Cadet branch of the House of Chakri Born: 8 January 1987
Lines of succession
Preceded by Prince Dipangkorn Rasmijoti	Line of succession to the Thai throne 2nd in line	Succeeded by The Princess Royal
Order of precedence
Preceded by The Princess Suddhanarinatha	Thai order of precedence 7th position	Succeeded by Prince Dipangkorn Rasmijoti
Business positions
First	Chairwoman of Sirivannavari; 2005–present	Incumbent
