= Vatchrawee Vivacharawongse =

Son of Rama X and former Thai prince

- วัชรวีร์ วิวัชรวงศ์
- Born: Vatchrawee Mahidol; 14 June 1985 (age 41); Bangkok, Thailand
- Other name: Inn
- Education: Stetson University
- Occupation: Financier
- Parents: Vajiralongkorn; Sujarinee Vivacharawongse
- Relatives: Bhumibol Adulyadej (grandfather)

Vatchrawee Vivacharawongse (Thai: วัชรวีร์ วิวัชรวงศ์, RTGS: Vatcharawee Wiwatcharawong; 14 June 1985) is a Thai-American financier and former member of the Thai royal family.

== Early life and education ==
Vatchrawee was born on 14 June 1985 to then Crown Prince Vajiralongkorn and then wife Sujarinee Vivacharawongse, He is the fourth son of King Vajiralongkorn.

He graduated with two bachelor's degrees in international business and finance from Stetson University.

Vatchrawee Vivacharawongse House of Vivacharawongse Cadet branch of the House of Mahidol Born: 14 June 1985
Order of precedence
Preceded by Chakriwat Vivacharawongse	Thai order of precedence 26th position	Succeeded by Wutchaloem Vudhijaya
