= Juthavachara Vivacharawongse =

Son of Rama X and former Thai prince

- จุฑาวัชร วิวัชรวงศ์
- Born: Juthavachara Mahidol; 29 August 1979 (age 47); Bangkok, Thailand
- Other name: Max
- Education: Embry–Riddle Aeronautical University; Thomas Jefferson School of Law
- Occupation: Aerospace engineer
- Spouse: Riya Gough (m. 2013)
- Children: 3
- Parents: Vajiralongkorn (father); Sujarinee Vivacharawongse (mother)
- Relatives: Bhumibol Adulyadej (grandfather)

Juthavachara Vivacharawongse (Thai: จุฑาวัชร วิวัชรวงศ์ RTGS: Chuthawat Wiwatcharawong; born 29 August 1979) is a Thai-American aerospace engineer and former member of the Thai royal family. Born as the first son of then Crown Prince Vajiralongkorn, he fled Thailand after being banished in 1996 along with his younger brothers and mother. He now goes by the anglicised name Max.

== Early life and education ==
Juthavachara was born on 29 August 1979. He was the first son of King (then Crown Prince) Vajiralongkorn and his then 17-year old extramarital partner Yuvadhida Polpraserth (who later changed her name to Sujarinee Vivacharawongse). His birth name was Mom Chao Juthavachara Mahidol, "Mom Chao" being the lowest princely rank among Thai royal titles. He has three younger brothers and a younger sister as well as a number of half-siblings from his father's other relationships. After Vajiralongkorn obtained the divorce from his first wife, Juthavachara's parents married in 1994 and their children were presented to the public as members of the royal family.

Two years later, the couple separated in dramatic fashion. The mother fled with the children to London, later they moved to the United States, and they were banished from Thailand. Along with his brothers, Juthavachara lost his royal titles, while their sister was brought back to their father and remained a princess.

His family settled in central Florida where Juthavachara became a Tampa Bay Buccaneers fan. He continued to write letters to his father, then the crown prince. In 2003, during a visit by Vajiralongkorn to Chicago, the brothers confronted their father at the Thai consulate.

He graduated with a bachelor's degree in Aviation Technology and master of Aeronautical Science from Embry–Riddle Aeronautical University. Then in 2010 he graduated in Juris Doctor from Thomas Jefferson School of Law.

== Personal life ==
He married American Riya Gough in 2013, and they have a son and two daughters.

In 2025, he attempted to return to Thailand following his younger brother Vacharaesorn's return to Thailand in 2023 and was denied entry.

In September 2026, Juthavachara announced that he had applied for consideration for the position of chief executive officer of Thai Airways International. He said he had more than 25 years of international aviation experience and was then serving as director of strategic partnerships at CAMP Systems International.

Juthavachara Vivacharawongse House of Vivacharawongse Cadet branch of the House of Mahidol Born: 29 August 1979
Order of precedence
Preceded by Princess Nobhadol Chalermsri Yugala	Thai order of precedence 23rd position	Succeeded by Vacharaesorn Vivacharawongse
