= Sujarinee Vivacharawongse =

Thai actress and second wife of King Vajiralongkorn

- สุจาริณี วิวัชรวงศ์
- Born: Yuvadhida Polpraserth; 26 May 1962 (age 64); Bangkok, Thailand
- Other names: Yuvadhida Suratsawadee; Sujarinee Mahidol
- Occupation: Actress
- Years active: 1977–1979
- Spouse: Vajiralongkorn (Rama X) (m. 1994; div. 1996)
- Children: Juthavachara Vivacharawongse; Vacharaesorn Vivacharawongse; Chakriwat Vivacharawongse; Vatchrawee Vivacharawongse; Princess Sirivannavari
- Military career
- Allegiance: Thailand
- Branch: Royal Thai Army
- Service years: 1992–1996
- Rank: Lieutenant colonel

Sujarinee Vivacharawongse (Thai: สุจาริณี วิวัชรวงศ์; RTGS: Sucharini Wiwatcharawong; born 26 May 1962), born Yuvadhida Polpraserth (Thai: ยุวธิดา ผลประเสริฐ; RTGS: Yuwathida Phonprasoet), stage-named Yuvadhida Suratsawadee (Thai: ยุวธิดา สุรัสวดี; RTGS: Yuwathida Suratsawadi) or nicknamed Benz (Thai: เบ๊นซ์), is a Thai actress who was a consort and then the second wife of Vajiralongkorn, then the Crown Prince of Thailand, from 1994 to 1996. She now lives in the United States.

== Early life ==
Sujarinee was born on 26 May 1962, the daughter of Thanit Polpraserth and Yaovalak Komarakul na Nagara. Her father was a musician and composer in the Sunthraphon band. Her mother is a direct descendant of King Taksin the Great of the Thonburi Kingdom through the Komarakul na Nagara family whose ancestor was Chaophraya Nakhon (Noi), an acknowledged, natural son of the king.

== Career ==
At fifteen, she was introduced to Thai filmography when actress Sarinthip Siriwan helped her to find a job in the drama Kot haeng kam and Manut pralat. In 1977, she co-starred in the films Sip ha yok yok sip hok mai yon and Lueat nai din. In 1978 and 1979, she was a leading actress in the film Saen saep, Ai thuek and Hua chai thi chom din.

In August 1979, she announced her retirement from the entertainment industry.

== Relationship with the crown prince and children ==
In late-1978, when Yuvadhida Polpraserth was 16 years old, she was introduced to the Thai crown prince Vajiralongkorn, who at the time was married to his first wife, Princess Soamsawali, and about to become a father. While he remained married to his estranged wife until 1993, Yuvadhida became his steady companion and gave birth to four sons and a daughter:

- Juthavachara Mahidol (จุฑาวัชร มหิดล Chuthawat Mahidon, born 29 August 1979), married Riya Gough on 1 September 2013, has issue.
- Vacharaesorn Mahidol (วัชรเรศร มหิดล Watchareson Mahidon, born 27 May 1981), married Elisa Garafano, has issue
- Chakriwat Mahidol (จักรีวัชร มหิดล Chakkriwat Mahidon, born 26 February 1983)
- Vatcharawee Mahidol (วัชรวีร์ มหิดล Watcharawi Mahidon, born 14 June 1985)
- Busyanambejra Mahidol (บุษย์น้ำเพชร มหิดล Butnamphet Mahidon, born 8 January 1987)

As illegitimate children of a "celestial prince" they received the lowest princely rank of Mom Chao. Without any public explanation of her role, Yuvadhida accompanied Vajiralongkorn on an official visit to China in 1987 and on other royal duties. In the same year, the couple's unofficial relationship caused a diplomatic incident when the Japanese government refused to welcome the crown prince's extramarital partner during a state visit. Reportedly, Yuvadhida accepted Vajiralongkorn's relationships with other women but threatened to leave him when he allowed another consort to move into the palace at the end of 1993.

After the Crown Prince had finally obtained the divorce from his first wife, Yuvadhida and Vajiralongkorn married at a palace ceremony in February 1994, without informing the public. They were blessed by the King and the Princess Mother, but not by the Queen (who had arranged Vajiralongkorn's first marriage to her niece Soamsawali and did not approve of the divorce). After the wedding, she was allowed to change her name to Mom Sujarinee Mahidol na Ayudhya (หม่อมสุจาริณี มหิดล ณ อยุธยา), signifying she was a commoner married to a royal. She was also commissioned as a major in the Royal Thai Army. It was not until the Crown Prince's 42nd birthday in July 1994 that Sujarinee and their children were presented as members of the royal family for the first time. In 1995, when King Bhumibol was hospitalised and the Princess Mother died, Sujarinee's appearances alongside the Crown Prince became rare.

Sujarinee, together with her children, fled to England in 1996. Vajiralongkorn had posters placed around his palace accusing her of committing adultery with 60-year-old air marshal Anand Rotsamkhan (อนันต์ รอดสำคัญ). She and her sons were banished from Thailand and stripped of their royal names and titles, instead taking the family name Vivacharawongse. On the other hand, Vajiralongkorn had their only daughter, Princess Busyanambejra, brought back from London to Thailand to live with him. Her royal status was elevated in 2005 (becoming HRH Princess Sirivannavari) and again after her father's accession to the throne in 2016. Sujarinee and her sons have since moved to the United States.

== Filmography ==
=== Film ===
Year	Thai Title	Transliteration Title	Role
1977	15 หยก ๆ 16 ไม่หย่อน	Sip ha yok yok sip hok mai yon	
1977	เลือดในดิน	Lueat nai din	Kalong
1978	แสนแสบ	Saen saep	Choi
1979	ไอ้ถึก	Ai thuek	
1979	หัวใจที่จมดิน	Hua chai thi chom din	
1979	รอยไถ	Roi thai	

=== Drama ===
Year	Thai Title	Transliteration Title	Role
1971	กฎแห่งกรรม	Kot haeng kam	
1971	มนุษย์ประหลาด	Manut pralat	
1977	คมพยาบาท	Khom Phayabat	Noi
1978	ป่าฆาตกร	Pa Khattakon	

== Royal decorations ==
- 1995 – Commander (Third Class) of the Most Exalted Order of the White Elephant
- 1993 – Commander (Third Class) of the Most Noble Order of the Crown of Thailand
