= Chao Ratchabut =

Chao Ratchabut (เจ้าราชบุตร) can refer to:

- Chao Ratchabut (Mokfa Na Nan)
- Chao Ratchabut (Wongtawan Na Chiang Mai)
