= Borwornsak Uwanno =

Thai Politician

- บวรศักดิ์ อุวรรณโณ
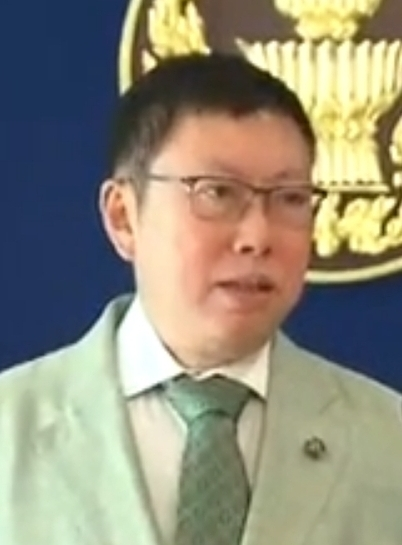

Deputy Prime Minister of Thailand
- In office 19 September 2025 – 30 March 2026
- Prime Minister: Anutin Charnvirakul

Secretary-General to the Cabinet
- In office 1 April 2003 – 10 June 2006
- Prime Minister: Thaksin Shinawatra
- Preceded by: Wissanu Krea-ngam
- Succeeded by: Rongpon Jareonpun

Personal details
- Born: October 19, 1954 (age 71) Songkhla, Thailand
- Spouse: Parichat Chumsai (divorced)
- Children: 2
- Education: Chulalongkorn University; Paris-Panthéon-Assas University; Paris Nanterre University

Borwornsak Uwanno (Thai: บวรศักดิ์ อุวรรณโณ RTGS: Bowonsak Uwanno, sometimes spelled Bowornsak Uwanno; born October 19, 1954) is a Thai legal expert, government official and professor-emeritus of Law at Chulalongkorn University. He was a principal member of the 1997 constitution Drafting Committee and served as secretary-general of King Prajadhipok's Institute and later cabinet secretary-general under Thaksin Shinawatra's government. After the coups d'état of 2006 and 2014, he helped authoring interim constitutions and served in junta-appointed legislative bodies. In 2017 he has chaired the government's Legal Reform Committee. From September 2025 to March 2026, he has served as Deputy Prime Minister of Thailand under Anutin Charnvirakul.

== Life ==
Borwornsak was born in the southern Thai city of Songkhla to a Thai Chinese family. He is a relative of former deputy prime minister Wissanu Krea-ngam and they lived together in the same house as children. He is divorced from Parichat Chumsai na Ayutthaya, with whom he has two children.

After graduating from the prestigious Triam Udom Suksa School, Borwornsak studied law at Chulalongkorn University, obtaining a "gold-medal" first class honours degree in 1975 and was admitted to the Thai bar the following year. From 1976 he taught as a lecturer at the Faculty of Law of his alma mater. He continued his studies in France, completing a DSU in administrative law from University of Paris II (Panthéon-Assas) in 1979, a DEA and a third-cycle doctorate in general public law from Paris Nanterre University in 1982.

In 1988, Borwornsak became a policy advisor at the Secretariat of the Prime Minister, rising to deputy secretary to the Prime Minister for policy matters the following year. In 1991, he returned to his academic function, teaching administrative law at Chulalongkorn University. Borwornsak was a member of the House Ad Hoc Committee on Constitutional Reform (1993–94) and a member of the Committee of Democracy Development that amended the 1992 Constitution. In 1995, he served as the dean of the Faculty of Law.

Borwornsak was the secretary-general of the Constitution Drafting Committee preparing the 1997 constitution. In 1998, he completed a course at the National Defence College of Thailand. From 1999 to 2003, he served as the secretary-general of King Prajadhipok's Institute, a state-run research and education centre for democratic politics and administration.

In 2003, he once again entered government service, becoming secretary-general of the cabinet, the highest-ranking civil servant advising the cabinet on legal affairs. In this position, he succeeded his personal friend Wissanu Krea-ngam who had become Deputy Prime Minister in Thaksin Shinawatra's government. During the 2005–06 Thai political crisis and after the dissolution of parliament, both Wissanu and Borwornsak distanced themselves from the Thaksin administration and resigned their respective government posts. Borwornsak temporarily entered Buddhist monkhood.

After the 19 September 2006 military coup, Borwornsak Uwanno, alongside Wissanu Krea-ngam and Meechai Ruchuphan, helped the military junta (Council for Democratic Reform under the Constitutional Monarchy, CDR) drafting a post-coup interim constitution. According to political scientist Thitinan Pongsudhirak, Borwornsak and Wissanu could "seemingly write constitutions overnight". Subsequently, Borwornsak became a member of the junta-appointed National Legislative Assembly.

After the 2014 Thai coup d'état, Borwornsak was appointed member of the National Reform Council (NRC), serving as this body's deputy speaker. At the same time, he chaired the junta-appointed Constitution Drafting Committee. However, in September 2015, the draft was rejected by a majority of the NRC members, resulting in a dissolution of both the drafting committee and the NRC itself. Borwornsak was replaced by Meechai Ruchuphan as chairman of a new Constitution Drafting Committee. In August 2017, Prime Minister Prayut Chan-o-cha appointed him chairman of the Legal Reform Committee.

== Work ==
Being strongly involved in the drafting of the Thai constitutions of 1997 and 2017 as well as the 2006 interim constitution, Borwornsak is considered to be one of the country's most influential constitutional experts. In the 1997 constitution drafting process, he was a main advocate of the introduction of a Constitutional Court modelled after continental European courts. At the same time he was apprehensive of providing the court with too much power and successfully advised against mentioning it in article 7, a crucial provision for constitutional conflict situations.

As a legal scholar, Borwornsak has published articles justifying the strong role of the monarchy in Thai politics, the severe punishment of lèse majesté as well as the recurrent military coups toppling democratically elected governments in the country. After his retirement from the Thaksin administration in 2006, he published a lengthy article about the "Ten Principles of a Righteous King" and their role in Thai constitutional tradition, lauding the monarch as the "Supreme Arbitrator and Conciliator of the Nation". According to Borwornsak, Thailand's sovereignty resides in both the monarchy and the people. By granting a constitution in 1932, the King shared his sovereignty with the people. After each coup d'état, the sovereignty reverts to the monarch until he signs an interim constitution, whereby he again shares sovereignty with the people.

Political scientist Eugénie Mérieau mentions Borwornsak, together with Wissanu Krea-ngam and Meechai Ruchuphan, as a leading example of academics who laid the legal foundations for authoritarian government in Thailand and an exponent of a "legal–military alliance for illiberal constitutionalism".

== Decorations ==
Borwornsak has received the following decorations and awards in the Honours System of Thailand:

- Knight Grand Cordon (Special Class) of the Order of the White Elephant (2000)
- Knight Grand Cordon (Special Class) of the Order of the Crown of Thailand (1995)
- Knight Grand Cross (First Class) of the Order of the Direkgunabhorn (2004)
- Grand Companion (Third Class, Upper Grade) of the Order of Chula Chom Klao (2004)

In addition, following foreign decorations were conferred on him:

- Knight Grand Cross of the Order of Orange-Nassau (Netherlands)
- Officer of the National Order of Merit (France)
