= National Legislative Assembly of Thailand (2014) =

Unicameral legislature of the Thailand (2014–2019)

National Legislative Assembly สภานิติบัญญัติแห่งชาติ Sapha Nitibanyat Haeng Chat

Type
- Type: Unicameral

Leadership
- President: Pornpetch Wichitcholchai
- First Vice President: Surachai Leangboonleodchai
- Second Vice President: Peerasak Phorchit

Structure
- Seats: 250 seats
- Political groups: Appointed from various sectors by the National Council for Peace and Order; Military (145); Police (13); Volunteer Defense Corps (10); Independent (80)

Meeting place
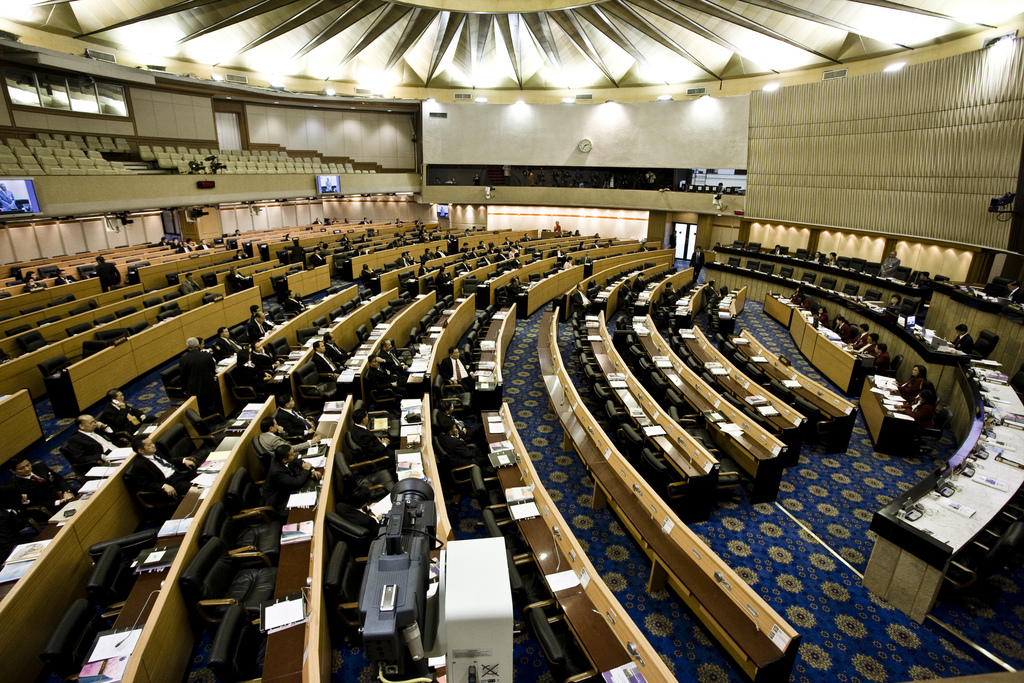
- Parliament House of Thailand, Dusit, Bangkok, Thailand

Website
- www.senate.go.th

The National Legislative Assembly of Thailand (Thai: สภานิติบัญญัติแห่งชาติ; RTGS: Sapha Nitibanyat Haeng Chat; abrv: NLA) was the unicameral legislative branch of the government of Thailand during the National Council for Peace and Order military junta between 2014 and 2019.

The NLA was established after the National Council for Peace and Order (NCPO) ratified the 2014 constitution, thus making the NLA the only parliamentary body of Thailand for the period of military rule.

The NLA was created to temporarily replace the elected National Assembly of Thailand (NAT) after General Prayut Chan-o-cha seized power from the civilian caretaker government during the 2013–2014 Thai political crisis. Alongside the NLA, there is another body established by the NCPO to implement political and social reforms, the National Reform Steering Assembly, which replaced the National Reform Council. The NLA was heavily influenced by NCPO. Thus, it functioned as a rubber stamp for the junta rather than the actual legislative body.

After the promulgation of the 2017 constitution, the NAT was reestablished and the NLA was dissolved, albeit pending elections on 24 March 2019.

== Composition ==
The non-partisan NLA at inception was to consist of no more than 220 members appointed from various sectors of the country by the NCPO and approved by the king. Of the 200 initial NLA members, 97 were military officers, (69 on active duty), eight police (four on active duty). The remaining 85 members were former senators, university rectors, and business people. In early-May 2016, an article in the Journal of Contemporary Asia reported that the average income of the members of the NLA is 32 times the per capita income (US$5,778) in Thailand.

The 2014 interim constitution was subsequently amended to enlarge the NLA to 250 members from 220, effective 2 September 2016. The military government appointed 200 NLA members after the coup in May 2014. Twelve resigned, two died, and 31 more were added. To fully populate the NLA, in October 2016, Gen. Prayut Chan-o-cha submitted a list of 33 new NLA appointees to the king for royal approval. Twenty-eight of the 33 are military or police general officers, most of them serving officers. As legislators they will not receive salaries. Instead, each one is paid a "position allowance" of 71,230 baht per month with an "extra allowance" of 42,330 baht a month. State officials are not permitted to receive salaries from more than one source, but may accept unlimited position allowances and other compensation so long as the compensation is not called "salary". Seven members of the NLA with high rates of absenteeism were investigated by the body and found to be eligible to keep their seats and compensatory allowances. Gen. Preecha Chan-o-cha, the younger brother of junta chief Prayut Chan-o-cha, was the worst offender of the seven. He was found to have cast only six votes out of a total 453 roll calls during a six-month period. Assembly bylaws call for members to be removed if they don't participate in more than one-third of all votes during a 90-day period.

In June 2018, The Nation reported that NLA members are paid at least 113,560 baht per month.
