= National Reform Council =

- สภาปฏิรูปแห่งชาติ
- Formation: 6 October 2014; 12 years ago
- Dissolved: 6 September 2015; 11 years ago
- Headquarters: Parliament House
- Members: 250
- Appointer: King Bhumibol Adulyadej
- Chairman: Tienchai Kiranandana
- First Deputy Chairman: Borwornsak Uwanno
- Second Deputy Chairman: Tassana Boonthong

The National Reform Council (NRC; Thai: สภาปฏิรูปแห่งชาติ; RTGS: Sapha Patirup Haeng Chat) was a committee established under the 2014 interim constitution of Thailand, enacted by Thailand's ruling military junta, the National Council for Peace and Order (NCPO), from 2014 to 2015. The committee was established to draft a new Constitution and implement reforms across Thailand.

== History ==
On 2 October 2014, King Bhumibol Adulyadej appointed 250 members to the National Reform Council. The degree was published in the Royal Gazette on 6 October 2014.

On 21 October 2014, the Council held its first meeting, unanimously electing Tienchai Kiranandana as Chairman.

On 6 September 2015, Council rejected the NCPO-drafted constitution 135 to 105, with 10 members not voting. This led to the immediate dissolution of the Council and a new drafting process.

On 5 October 2015, Council was replaced by the National Reform Steering Assembly (NRSA).
