= Thatchai Sumitra =

Thai academic administrator

- ธัชชัย สุมิตร

14th President of Chulalongkorn University
- In office 1 April 2000 – 31 March 2004
- Preceded by: Tienchai Kiranandana
- Succeeded by: Suchada Kiranandana

Thatchai Sumitra (Thai: ธัชชัย สุมิตร, RTGS: Thatchai Sumit) is a Thai academic administrator who served as the 14th president of Chulalongkorn University from 2000 to 2004. He previously served as president of the Nuclear Society of Thailand and president of the Institute for the Promotion of Teaching Science and Technology (IPST).
