= Tienchai Kiranandana =

Thai academic

- เทียนฉาย กีระนันทน์

Chairman of the National Reform Council
- In office 30 October 2014 – 6 September 2015

13th President of Chulalongkorn University
- In office 1 April 1996 – 31 March 2000
- Succeeded by: Thatchai Sumitra

Personal details
- Spouse: Suchada Kiranandana

Tienchai Kiranandana (Thai: เทียนฉาย กีระนันทน์) (Note: RTGS: Thianchai Kiranan; other spellings include Thienchay Kiranandana, Tianchai Kiranan, and Tienchai Kiranan) is a Thai academic who served as Chairman of the National Reform Council (NRC) under the National Council for Peace and Order (NCPO) military junta from 2014 to 2015. He previously served as the 13th President of Chulalongkorn University from 1996 to 2000.

== Career ==
On 21 October 2024, Tienchai was unanimously elected as chairman of the 250-member National Reform Council. He was nominated by Councillor Chai Chidchob. On 30 October, Tienchai was appointed by royal degree by King Bhumibol Adulyadej. The council was tasked with drafting a new constitution along with implementing reforms in at least 10 areas. The appointment was welcomed by junta leader and Prime Minister Prayut Chan-o-cha.

On 6 September 2015, the NRC rejected proposals for a new constitution proposed by the NCPO, forcing a new drafting committee to be formed.
