= Order of Chula Chom Klao =

Thai chivalric order

The Most Illustrious Order of Chula Chom Klao เครื่องราชอิสริยาภรณ์จุลจอมเกล้า
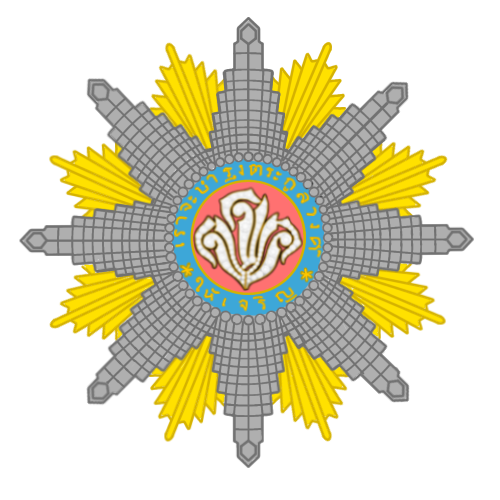
- 1st Class Breast Star, Knight Grand Cordon & Knight (or Dame) Grand Cross

Awarded by the King of Thailand
- Type: Inheritance Order
- Established: 16 November 1873
- Motto: "เราจะบำรุงตระกูลวงศ์ให้เจริญ" (lit. 'I will nourish the family line to prosper.')
- Awarded for: Memorials the people who were devoted their officials to their family line.
- Status: Currently constituted
- Founder: King Chulalongkorn
- Sovereign: King Vajiralongkorn
- Grades: 4

Statistics
- First induction: 16 November 1873
- Last induction: 17 June 2026

Precedence
- Next (higher): Order of the Nine Gems
- Next (lower): Ratana Varabhorn Order of Merit (Former orders)
- (GCC) (KGC or DGC) (ThChW)

The Most Illustrious Order of Chula Chom Klao (Thai: เครื่องราชอิสริยาภรณ์จุลจอมเกล้า; RTGS: Khrueang Ratcha-itsariyaphon Chunla Chom Klao) is a Thai order established on 16 November 1873 by King Chulalongkorn (Rama V) to commemorate the 90th jubilee of the Chakri dynasty. The order bears his name, Chula Chom Klao, and its ribbon is pink, symbolising the birthday colour of Tuesday, the day of Chulalongkorn's birth.

== Insignia ==
The full insignia for the Order consists of:

- Pendant – The pendant design varies between classes.
- Sash – Female: The pendant is suspended from a pink sash 7.5 cm wide, worn over the left shoulder to the right hip. It can also be attached onto the silk ribbon of 5 cm wide, to wear on the front left shoulder.
- Star – The star design varies between classes.
- Collar – The collar consists of sixteen Royal Ciphers of King Rama V in pink enamel and seventeen gold rosettes fastened to each other by chain links. The centre of the collar has an oval medallion with Airavata elephants, enamelled in white, and a gold crown with a starburst at the top. Flanking the medallion on either side are two gold lion supporters, carrying Royal Parasols. The whole piece is topped with white bows.
- Medal – The medal, also known as the 'Junior Companion', is a silver disc. The central piece bears a portrait of King Rama V and is surrounded by a raised band, engraved with the motto "I Shall Maintain My Royal Family". The whole piece is edged with a wreath and topped with a crown with a starburst. The reverse of the medal is engraved with Airavata elephants bearing the Trident and Thai script. The whole piece is surrounded by a Chakra and gold wreaths. The medal is suspended from a pink silk band of 4 cm wide, to wear on the left chest.

== Classes ==
The Order consists of three classes for male and female members, with an additional fourth class for women only. Some of the classes are further subdivided into several divisions. The number of members in each division is also limited. During the 50th anniversary of his accession to the throne, King Bhumibol promoted all recipients of the Order during the reign of his predecessor, King Rama VIII, by one class higher.

=== Sovereign ===
The Sovereign of the order is Knight Grand Cordon but their insignia is decorated with diamonds.

=== Consort ===
The Consort is Knight Grand Cordon, Special Class but their insignia is decorated with diamonds, though fewer than that of the Sovereign.

Collar of the Order of Chula Chom Klao (Heraldry)

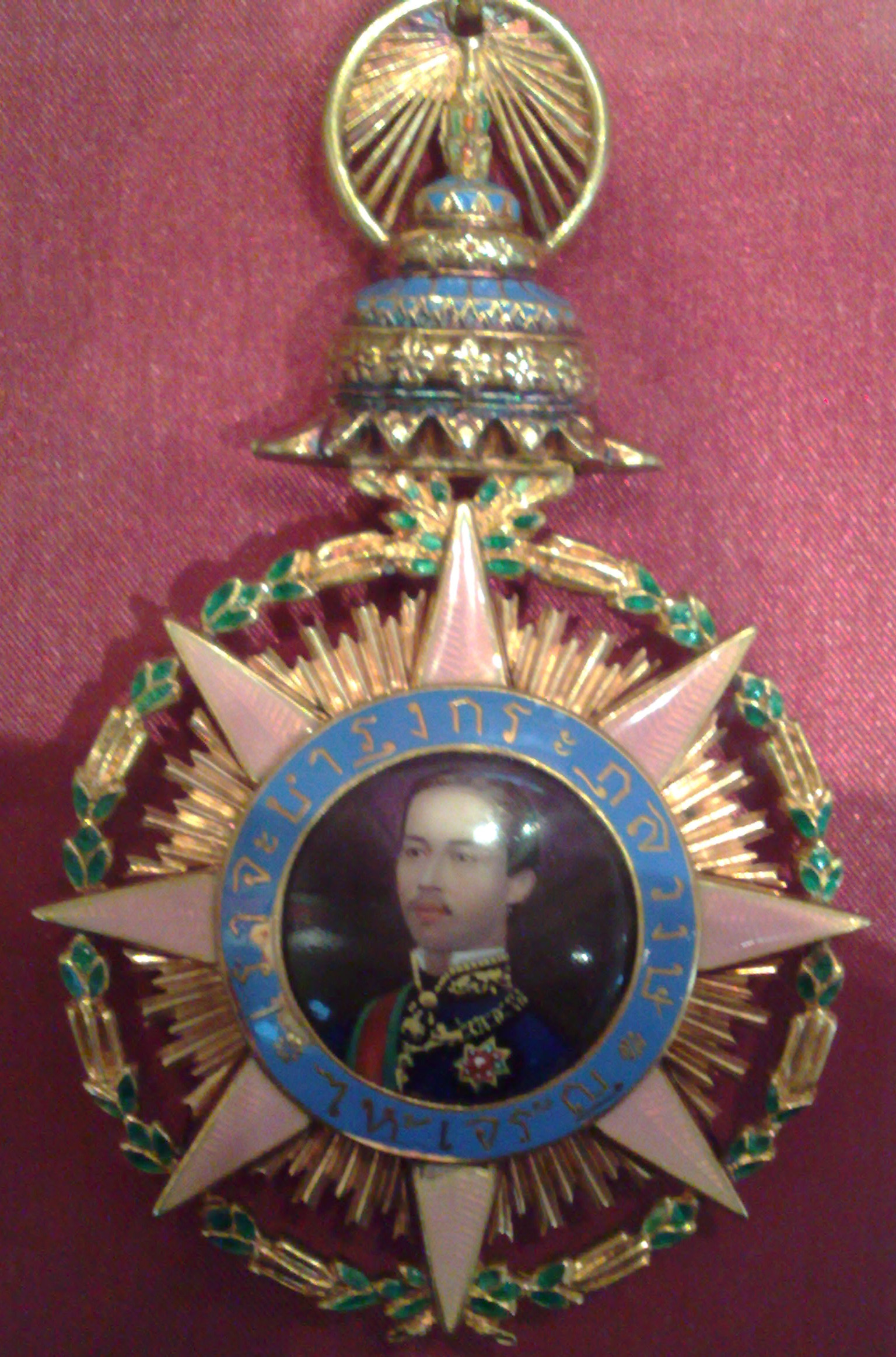
Knight Grand Cordon or Grand Cross Order of Chula Chom Klao (Pendant)

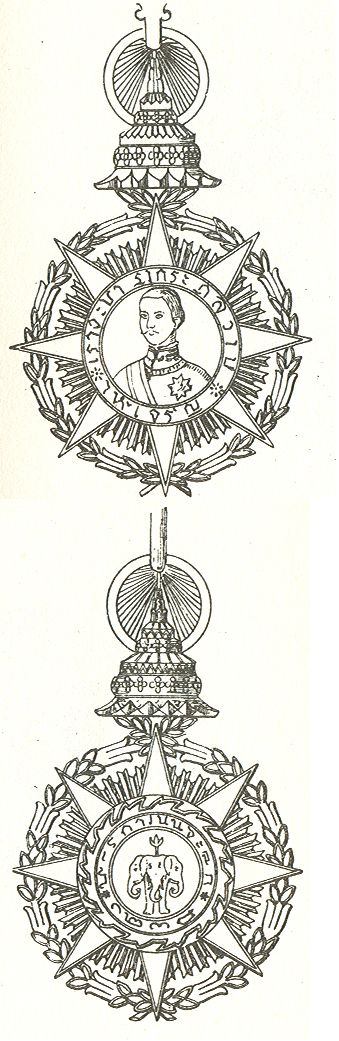
Pendant of the Order.

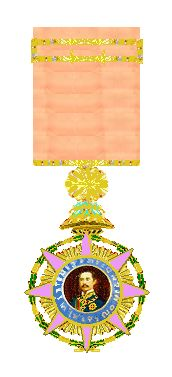
Companion (Third Class, Lower Grade) (CC).

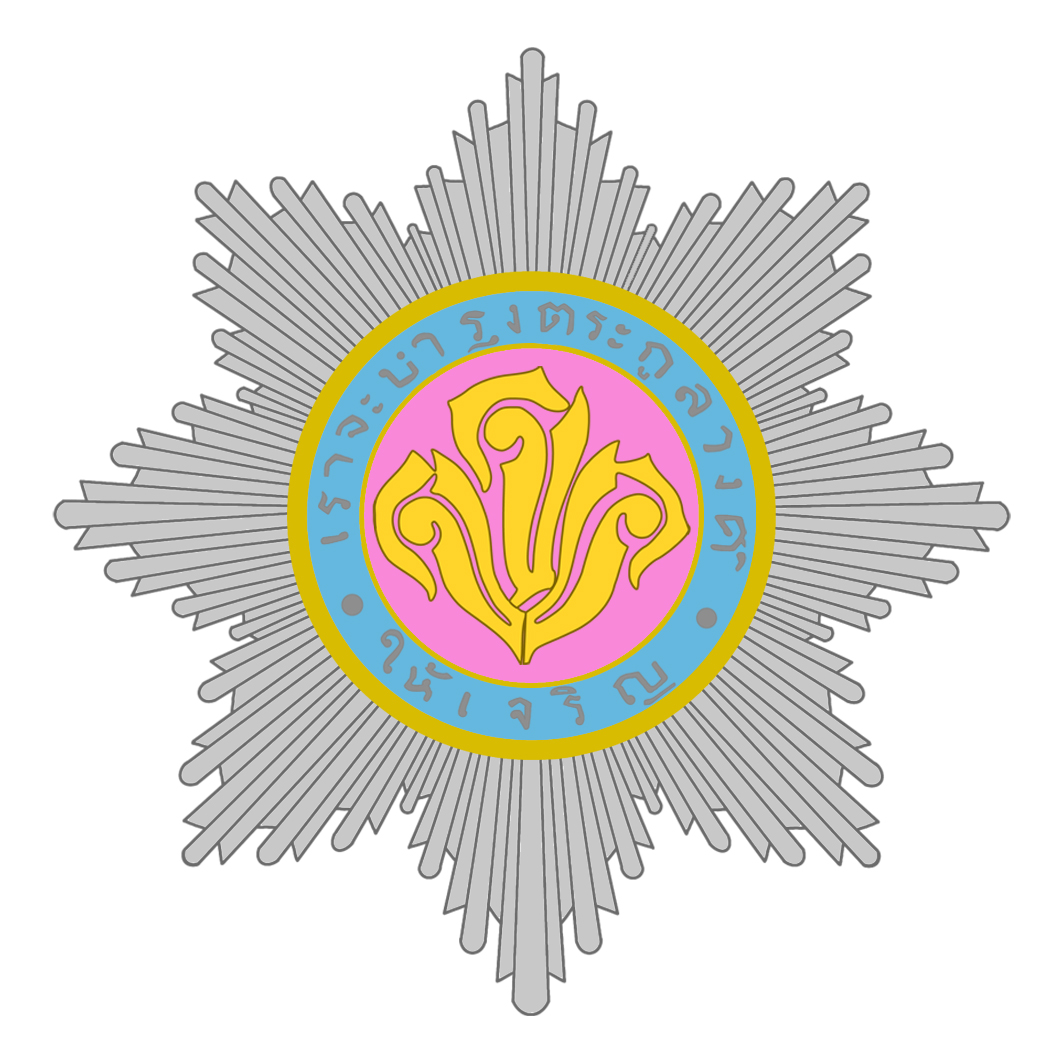
2nd Class Breast Star, Knight (or Dame) Grand Commander

=== First Class ===
The First Class of the order is broken into two divisions for men, and one division for women.

- Knight (or Dame) Grand Cordon (Special Class) (PCW)

Thai ปฐมจุลจอมเกล้าวิเศษ (Pathom Chulachomklao Visesh), postnominal ป.จ.ว.
Insignia consists of the pendant, star, collar, sash and medal.

The pendant design for men is of a gold circular disc, with the enamelled portrait of King Rama V placed at the centre. The central piece is surrounded by a blue enamelled circlet, engraved and gilded with the motto "I Shall Maintain My Royal Family" in Thai. Eight rays of a star, enamelled in pink, backed by a cogwheel of gold, lie at the edge. The points of the star are linked to a separate wreath of gold leaves, enamelled in green. The whole piece is topped with a gold crown of enamel work and a golden starburst. The back of the pendant has the Airavata elephants bearing the Trident enamelled in white at the centre. The central disc is surrounded by a blue enamelled circlet with Thai script. At the edge, it is surrounded by the Chakra, enamelled in white upon the red field.

The pendant design for women is similar to the pendant for men, but of smaller size and with brilliants at the crown and wreaths. The back is engraved with "1894" with Thai numerals in gilt. The star for men has sixteen rays of pierced silver and straight gold. The central piece consists of a pink disc with the Royal Cipher of King Rama V in brilliants and a blue enamelled circlet, engraved with the motto in gilt "I Shall Maintain My Royal Family" in Thai. The circlet is edged with a silver band set in brilliants. The star is worn on the left chest.
The star for women is similar to the Star for males, but of smaller size, to wear on the left chest.
There is no limit to the number of members.

- Knight (or Dame) Grand Cross (PM) (First Class)

Thai ปฐมจุลจอมเกล้า (Pathom Chulachomklao), postnominal ป.จ.
Insignia consists of the pendant, star, collar and sash. The pendant and star design is the same as for the Knight Grand Cordon.
Limited to 30 male and 20 female members.

=== Second Class ===
The Second Class of the order is broken into two divisions for men, and two divisions for women.

- Knight (or Dame) Grand Commander (ThCW) (Second Class, Upper Grade)

Thai ทุติยจุลจอมเกล้าวิเศษ (Thutiya Chunlachomklao Wiset), postnominal ท.จ.ว. (ThCW)
Insignia consists of the pendant, silk band and star (men only).

The pendant design for men is similar to that of the Knight Grand Cordon, suspended from a pink silk band 5 cm wide, to wear as collar.

The pendant design for women is similar to that of Dame Grand Cross but without brilliants, suspended from a pink sash 7.5 cm wide to wear over the left shoulder to the right hip or attached onto the pink silk ribbon 5 cm wide to wear on the front left shoulder.

The star is of uncut silver with eight points of straight rays. The central piece is a circular disc, enamelled in pink, with the Royal Cipher of King Rama V in gold. The disc is surrounded by a blue enamel circlet, engraved and gilded with the motto "I Shall Maintain My Royal Family" in Thai.

Limited to 200 male and 100 female members.

- Knight (or Dame) Commander (ThC) (Second Class, Lower Grade)

Thai ทุติยจุลจอมเกล้า (Thutiya Chunlachomklao), postnominal ท.จ. (ThC)
Insignia consists of the pendant and silk band.

The pendant design for men is the same as for the Knight Grand Commander(Second Class, higher grade).
The pendant design for women is similar Dame Grand Commander, attached onto the 5 cm silk ribbon to wear on the front left shoulder.

Limited to 250 male and 100 female members.

=== Third Class ===
The Third Class of the order is broken into three divisions for men, and one division for women.

- Grand Companion (Third Class, Upper Grade) (TCW)

Thai ตติยจุลจอมเกล้าวิเศษ (Tatiya Chulachomklao Visesh), postnominal ต.จ.ว.
Insignia consists of a pendant only. The pendant design is similar to that for a Knight Commander, but of smaller size. It is suspended from a pink silk band 4 cm wide, with an additional rosette, to wear on the left chest.
Limited to 250 male members.

- Companion (Third Class, Lower Grade) (TC)

Thai ตติยจุลจอมเกล้า (Tatiya Chulachomklao), postnominal ต.จ.
Insignia consists of a pendant only. The pendant design is similar to that for a Grand Companion, without the additional rosette. For women, the pendant design is similar to that of Dame Commander but of smaller size, attached on a silk ribbon 4 cm wide, to wear on the front left shoulder.
Limited to 200 male members and 250 female members.

- Junior Companion (TXC)

Thai ตติยานุจุลจอมเกล้า (Tatiyanu Chulachomklao), postnominal ต.อ.จ.
Insignia consists of the medal only.
Limited to 100 male members.

=== Fourth Class ===
The Fourth Class of the order has a single division for women.

- Member (CC)

Thai จตุตถจุลจอมเกล้า (Chatutatha Chulachomklao), postnominal จ.จ.
Insignia consists of the medal only. The medal is similar to that for the Companion, but of gilt and blue enamelled circlet. The reverse of the medal is similar to that of Companion, but with "1894" in the outer band in gilt.
Limited to 150 female members.

== Classes & Eligibility ==
Ribbon	Class	Name	Postnominals	Membership	Eligibility
	First Class	Knight (or Dame) Grand Cordon ปฐมจุลจอมเกล้าวิเศษ (Pathom Chulachomklao Visesh)	PCW ป.จ.ว.	No Limit	Royal Family members and foreign royal family or foreign head of state
	First Class	Knight (or Dame) Grand Cross ปฐมจุลจอมเกล้า (Pathom Chulachomklao)	PM ป.จ.	30	Royal family members, Privy Councils, Royal household
	First Class	Knight (or Dame) Grand Cross ปฐมจุลจอมเกล้า (Pathom Chulachomklao)	PM ป.จ.	20	Royal Family members or Female foreign head of state
	Second Class	Knight (or Dame) Grand Commander ทุติยจุลจอมเกล้าวิเศษ (Thutiya Chunlachomklao Wiset)	ThCW ท.จ.ว.	200	High-ranking military or civilians
	Second Class	Knight (or Dame) Grand Commander ทุติยจุลจอมเกล้าวิเศษ (Thutiya Chunlachomklao Wiset)	ThCW ท.จ.ว.	100	High-ranking female who is distinguished by Royal Family
	Second Class	Knight (or Dame) Commander ทุติยจุลจอมเกล้า (Thutiya Chunlachomklao)	ThC ท.จ.	250	Military or Civilians
	Second Class	Knight (or Dame) Commander ทุติยจุลจอมเกล้า (Thutiya Chunlachomklao)	ThC ท.จ.	100	High-ranking female military or civilians
	Third Class	Grand Companion ตติยจุลจอมเกล้าวิเศษ (Tatiya Chulachomklao Visesh)	TCW ต.จ.ว.	250	People who awarded Companion
	Third Class	Companion (Male & Female) ตติยจุลจอมเกล้า (Tatiya Chulachomklao)	TC ต.จ.	200	Inheritance from Knight Grand Cordon, Knight Grand Cross, Knight Grand Commander, Knight Commander
	Third Class	Companion (Male & Female) ตติยจุลจอมเกล้า (Tatiya Chulachomklao)	TC ต.จ.	250	Female members
	Third Class	Junior Companion ตติยานุจุลจอมเกล้า (Tatiyanu Chulachomklao)	TXC ต.อ.จ.	100	Inheritance from Knight Grand Cordon and Companion, Knight Grand Cross by grandson, Knight Grand Commander, Knight Commander
	Fourth Class	Member จตุตถจุลจอมเกล้า (Chatutatha Chulachomklao)	CC จ.จ.	150	Female members

== Titles for female members ==
- Married female recipients of the Dame Grand Cross and the Dame Grand Commander classes are titled Than Phu Ying (ท่านผู้หญิง, "Dame")
- Married female recipients of the Commander, Companion or Member classes are titled Khun Ying (คุณหญิง, "Lady")
- Unmarried female recipients of the Order are titled Khun (คุณ, "Madam")

== Inheritance ==
- Should a person be conferred the Knight Grand Cordon, his son should inherit the insignia on his death. It should then be passed on in the family until no male heir is to be found.
- Should a person be conferred the Knight Grand Cross, his son should inherit the insignia on his death.
- Should a person be conferred the Knight Grand Commander or Knight Commander, his son should inherit the insignia on his death.
- The person inheriting the insignia must be the eldest son of the family. Should he be inappropriate, the insignia should pass on to the younger sons.
- Should the person inheriting the insignia be insane or dead, it should be passed onto the son of that person.
- Should the person inherit the insignia from his father, he should be conferred as a Companion.
- Should the person inherit the insignia from his grandfather he should be conferred as a Junior Companion.

== Living notable recipients of the Order ==
=== Knight Grand Cordon ===
- King Vajiralongkorn

=== Knight Grand Cross ===
- General Phichit Kullavanich
- King Frederik X of Denmark
- Mom Rajawongse Thepkamol Devakula
- King Willem-Alexander of the Netherlands
- Phan Wannamethee
- Chirayu Isarangkun Na Ayuthaya
- General Surayud Chulanont
- Prince Chalermsuk Yugala
- Prince Dipangkorn Rasmijoti

=== Dame Grand Cross ===
- Princess Alexandra, Lady Ogilvy of the United Kingdom
- Princess Astrid, Mrs. Ferner of Norway
- Princess Irene of the Netherlands
- Imelda Marcos, First Lady of the Philippines
- Princess Ubol Ratana
- Sirindhorn, Princess Royal
- Chulabhorn, Princess Srisavangavadhana
- Lee Soon-ja, First Lady of South Korea
- Soamsawali, Princess Suddhanarinatha
- Queen Sofía of Spain
- Queen Saleha of Brunei
- Raja Permaisuri Agong Tuanku Bainun of Malaysia
- Princess Sirivannavari
- Raja Permaisuri Agong Siti Aishah of Malaysia
- Mariam Abdul Aziz
- Queen Silvia of Sweden
- Than Phu Ying Srirasmi Suwadee
- Raja Permaisuri Agong Sultanah Nur Zahirah of Malaysia
- Raja Permaisuri Agong Che Puan Besar Haminah of Malaysia
- Queen Suthida
- Chao Khun Phra Sineenatha
- Princess Siribha Chudabhorn
- Princess Aditayadorn Kitikhun

=== Knight Grand Commander ===
- General Chavalit Yongchaiyudh
- Anand Panyarachun
- Arsa Sarasin
- Chuan Leekpai
- Professor Wissanu Krea-ngam
- Mom Ratchawongse Chatumongol Sonakul
- Air Chief Marshal Chalit Pukbhasuk
- General Apirat Kongsompong
- General Prayut Chan-o-cha

=== Dame Grand Commander ===
- Than Phu Ying Busba Sathanapong
- Than Phu Ying Dhasanawalaya Sornsongkram
- Than Phu Ying Suthawan Sathirathai
- Than Phu Ying Ploypailin Jensen
- Than Phu Ying Sirikitiya Jensen
- Princess Uthaikanya Bhanubandhu
- Princess Srisavangvongse Yugala

=== Knight Commander ===
- Meechai Ruchuphan
- Dhanin Chearavanont
- Tarrin Nimmanahaeminda
- Charoen Sirivadhanabhakdi
- Don Pramudwinai
- Tienchai Kiranandana
- Banthoon Lamsam
- Anutin Charnvirakul

=== Dame Commander ===
- Mom Luang Piyapas Bhirombhakdi

=== Grand Companion ===
- Squadron Leader Prasong Soonsiri
- Prince Chatrichalerm Yukol
- General Yuthasak Sasiprapha
- General Teeradej Meepien
- Professor Borwornsak Uwanno
- Mom Rajawongse Pridiyathorn Devakula
- Professor Surakiart Sathirathai
- General Prawit Wongsuwon

=== Companion (male) ===
- Mom Rajawongse Sukhumbhand Paribatra

=== Companion (female) ===
- Khun Ying Kalaya Sophonpanich
- Khun Ying Jamsai Silpa-archa
- Khun Ying Vinita Diteeyont
- Khun Ying Potjaman Na Pombejra
- Khun Ying Jaruvan Maintaka

=== Junior Companion ===
- Mom Luang Panadda Diskul

=== Member ===
- Khun Ying Porntip Rojanasunan
- Khun Ying Sudarat Keyuraphan
- Khun Ying Patama Leeswadtrakul
