= Wilert Puriwat =

Thai academic

- วิเลิศ ภูริวัชร

18th President of Chulalongkorn University
- Incumbent
- Assumed office 30 June 2024
- Preceded by: Bundhit Eua-arporn

Personal details
- Education: Chulalongkorn University (BBA); Thammasat University (MBA); Yale University (MM); University of Oxford (DPhil)

Wilert Puriwat (Thai: วิเลิศ ภูริวัชร, RTGS: Wiroet Phuriwat) is a Thai academic who has served as the 18th president of Chulalongkorn University since 2024. Wilert previously served as Dean of Chulalongkorn Business School, where he oversaw the reorganization of the Modern Management Programme (MMP).
