= 2014 Thai coup d'état =

Military coup in Thailand

- Part of the 2013–2014 Thai political crisis
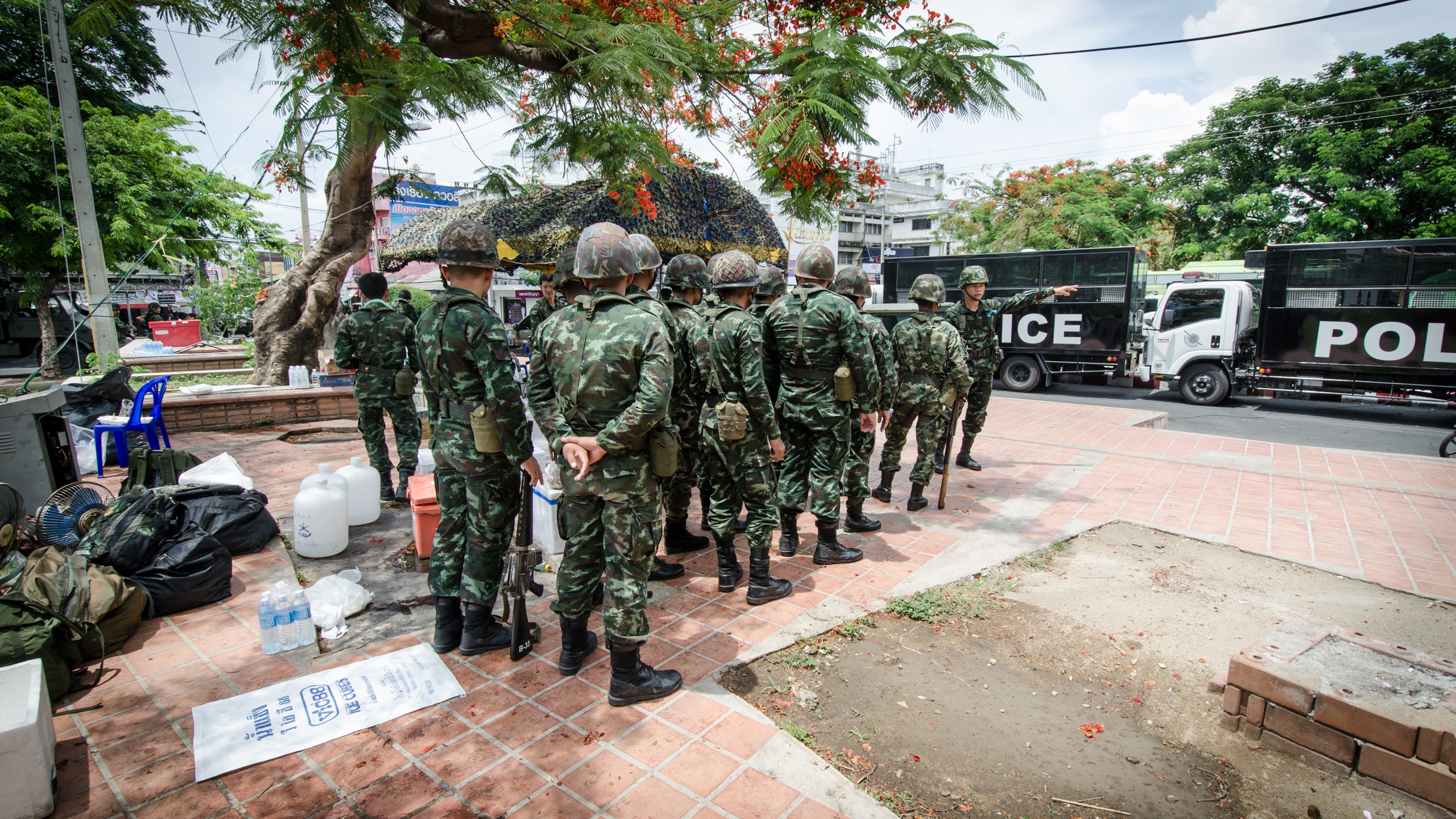
- Royal Thai Army soldiers in Chiang Mai
| Date | 22 May 2014; 12 years ago |
| Location | Thailand |
| Result | Successful military and police takeover: Niwatthamrong Boonsongpaisan removed as caretaker prime minister; Yingluck caretaker government dissolved; Senate of Thailand dissolved; 2007 constitution repealed; Military junta (NCPO) established; Prayut Chan-o-cha endorsed by King Bhumibol Adulyadej as NCPO leader; 2014 interim constitution enacted; 2017 constitution by the junta NLA enacted |

Belligerents
| Royal Thai Armed Forces; Royal Thai Police | Yingluck cabinet |

Commanders and leaders
| Prayut Chan-o-cha | Niwatthamrong Boonsongpaisan |

Strength
| Thai military: 300,000+; Thai police: 200,000+ | None |

Casualties and losses
| None | None |

On 22 May 2014, the Royal Thai Armed Forces, led by General Prayut Chan-o-cha, the commander-in-chief of the Royal Thai Army, launched a coup d'état, the twelfth since the country's first coup in 1932, against the caretaker government following six months of political crisis. The military established a junta called the National Council for Peace and Order (NCPO) to govern the nation. The coup ended the political conflict between the military-led regime and democratic power, which had been present since the 2006 Thai coup d'état known as the "unfinished coup". Seven years later, it developed into the 2020–2021 Thai protests to reform the monarchy of Thailand.

After dissolving the government and the Senate of Thailand, the NCPO vested executive and legislative powers in its leader and ordered the judicial branch to operate under its directives. In addition, it partially repealed the 2007 constitution, save the second chapter that concerned the king, declared martial law and curfew nationwide, banned political gatherings, arrested and detained politicians and anti-coup activists, imposed Internet censorship in Thailand and took control of the media.

The NCPO issued an interim constitution that granted itself amnesty and sweeping power. The NCPO also established a military-dominated national legislature which later unanimously elected Prayut as the new prime minister of the country.

In February 2021, government ministers Puttipong Punnakanta, Nataphol Teepsuwan and Thaworn Senniam were found guilty of insurrection during protests that led to the 2014 coup d'état.

== Background ==
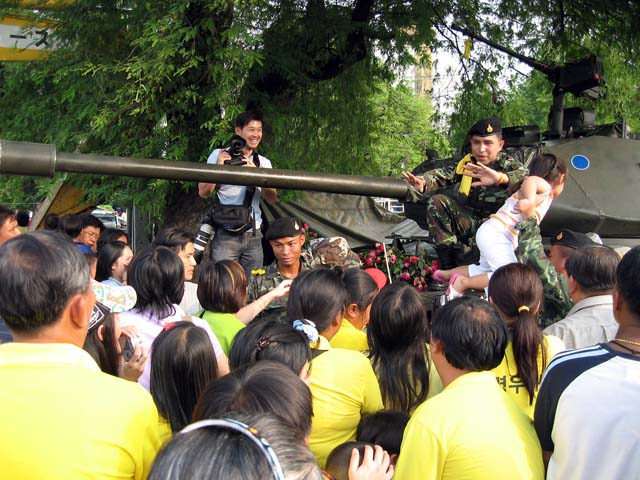
2006 Thai coup d'état

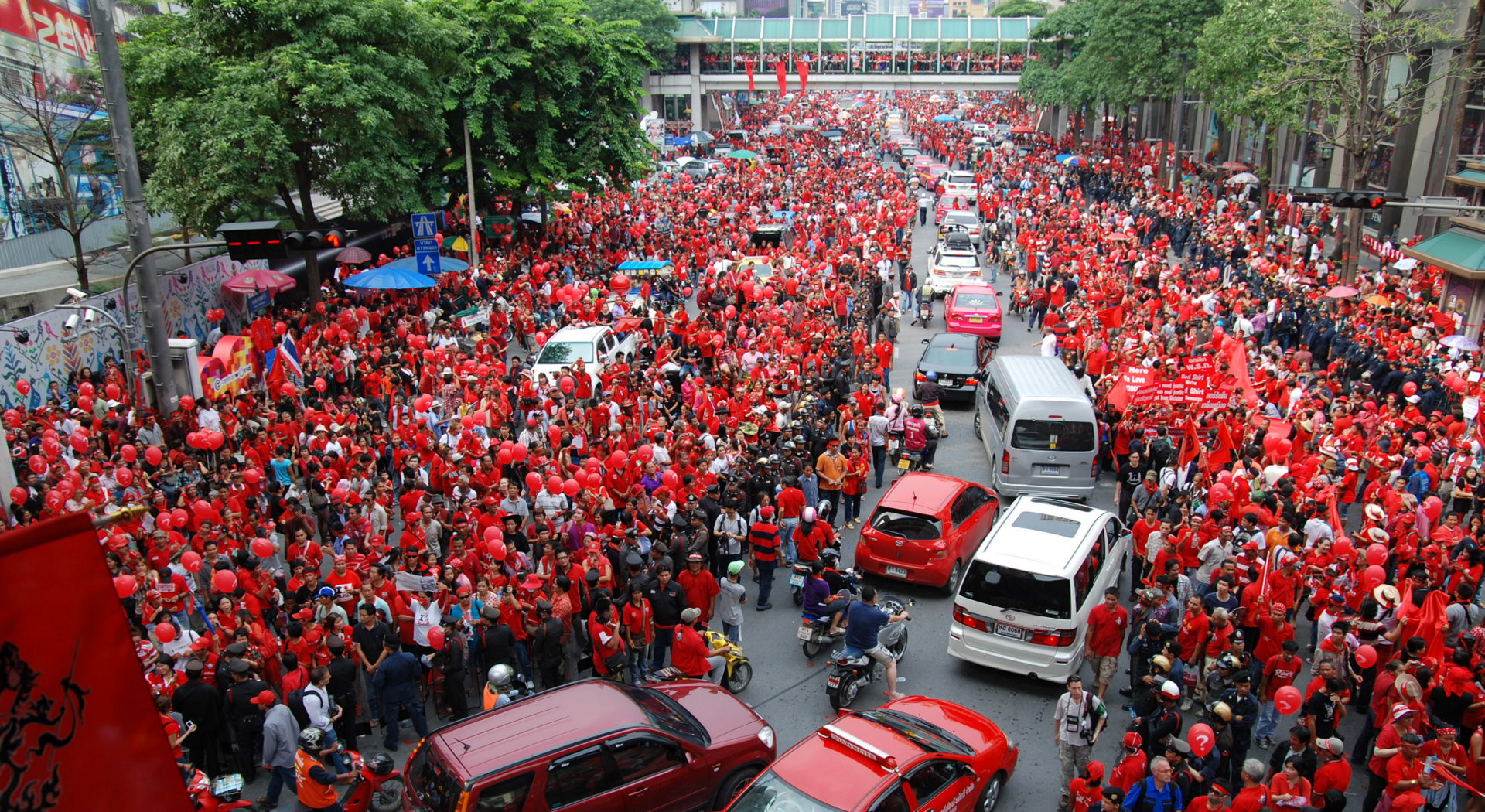
2010 Thai political protests

Thailand's politics system changed from absolute monarchy to democracy in the Siamese revolution of 1932. More than 10 coups occurred before the 1997 constitution of Thailand, widely hailed as a landmark in Thai democratic constitutional reform, was enacted. Four years later, Thaksin Shinawatra had become the first prime minister of Thailand to complete a full term in office, and his rule is generally agreed to have been one of the most distinctive in the country's modern history. After 2005–2006 Thai political crisis led by the People's Alliance for Democracy, Thaksin was overthrown in a military coup on 19 September 2006, accused of lèse-majesté. His Thai Rak Thai Party was outlawed and he was barred from political activity. Thaksin has since lived in self-imposed exile. He was sentenced in absentia to two years in jail for abuse of power. From abroad he has continued to influence Thai politics, through the People's Power Party that ruled in 2008, and its successor organisation Pheu Thai Party, as well as the United Front for Democracy Against Dictatorship or Red Shirts movement that were cracked down by Anupong Paochinda and Prayut Chan-o-cha's army, together with the Abhisit Vejjajiva and Suthep Thaugsuban's Democrat Party government, in 2010.

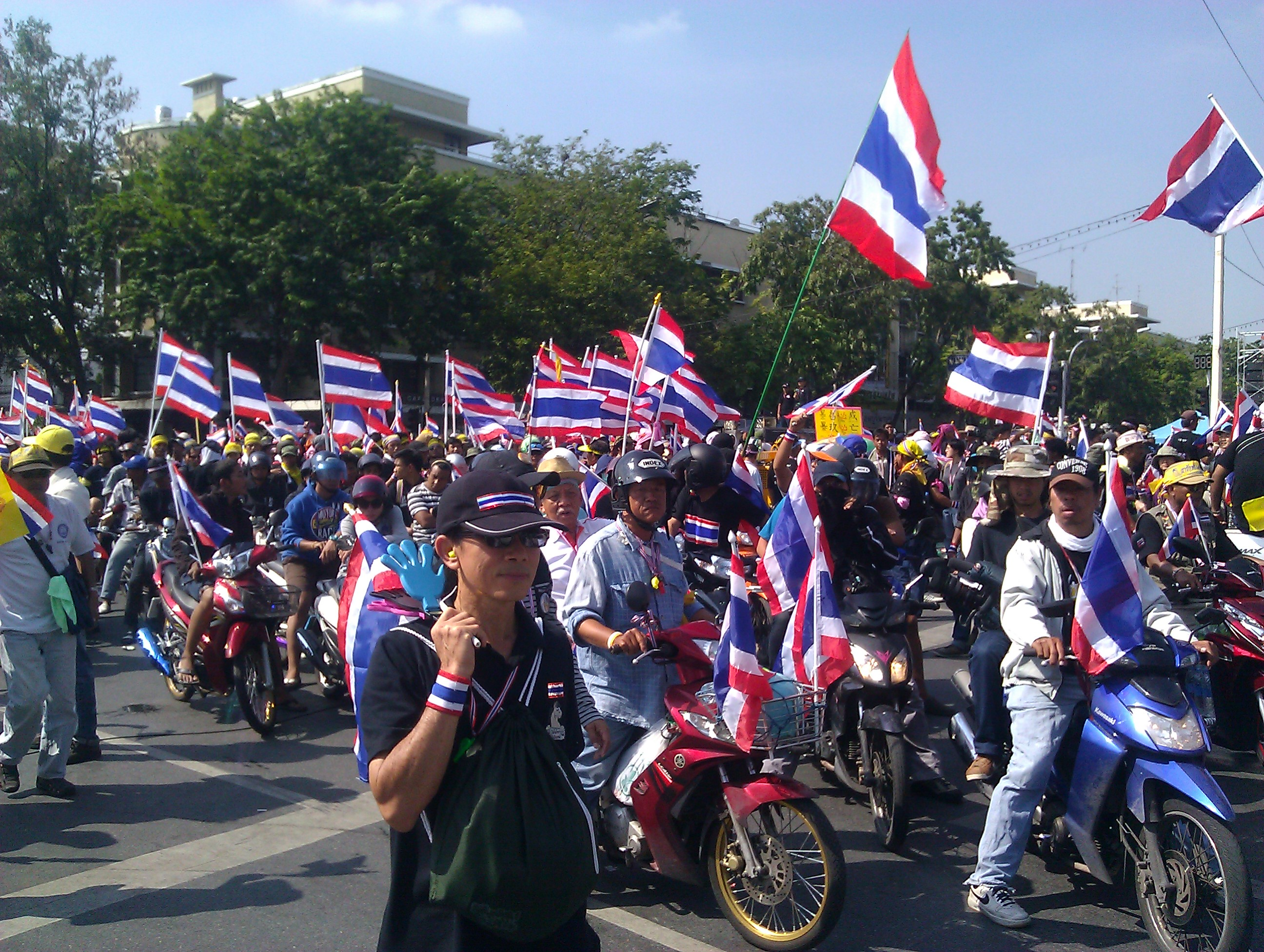
2013–14 Thai political crisis

In the 2011 general election, Yingluck Shinawatra and the Pheu Thai Party (PTP) won a landslide victory and formed the government with Yingluck as prime minister. Anti-government protests, led by former Democrat Party secretary general Suthep Thaugsuban, began in November 2013. Suthep later formed the People's Democratic Reform Committee (PDRC) for the purpose of demanding the establishment of an unelected "people's council" to supervise "political reform", seen as a dismissal of Thaksin power. Suthep told PDRC supporters that he had been in talks with General Prayut Chan-o-cha since 2010 about how to exclude Thaksin from power. Similarly, Reuters reported in December 2013 that close friends of Prayut, former army chief Anupong Paochinda and General Prawit Wongsuwon, were supporters of the PDRC.

Pro-government groups, including the Red Shirts, held mass rallies in response. Violence occasionally occurred, resulting in a number of deaths and injuries. In December 2013, Yingluck dissolved the House of Representatives and scheduled a general election for 2 February 2014. Disrupted by the anti-government protesters, the election was not completed on that day. The Constitutional Court then nullified the election on 21 March 2014. On 7 May 2014, the Constitutional Court unanimously removed Yingluck and nine other senior ministers from office over the controversial transfer of a top security officer in 2011. The remaining ministers selected Deputy Prime Minister and Minister of Commerce Niwatthamrong Boonsongpaisan to replace Yingluck as caretaker prime minister as protests continued.

Suthep claimed that before declaring martial law, Prayut told him that "Khun Suthep and your masses of PDRC supporters are too exhausted. It's now the duty of the army to take over the task".

== Immediately prior to the coup ==
=== Martial law imposition ===
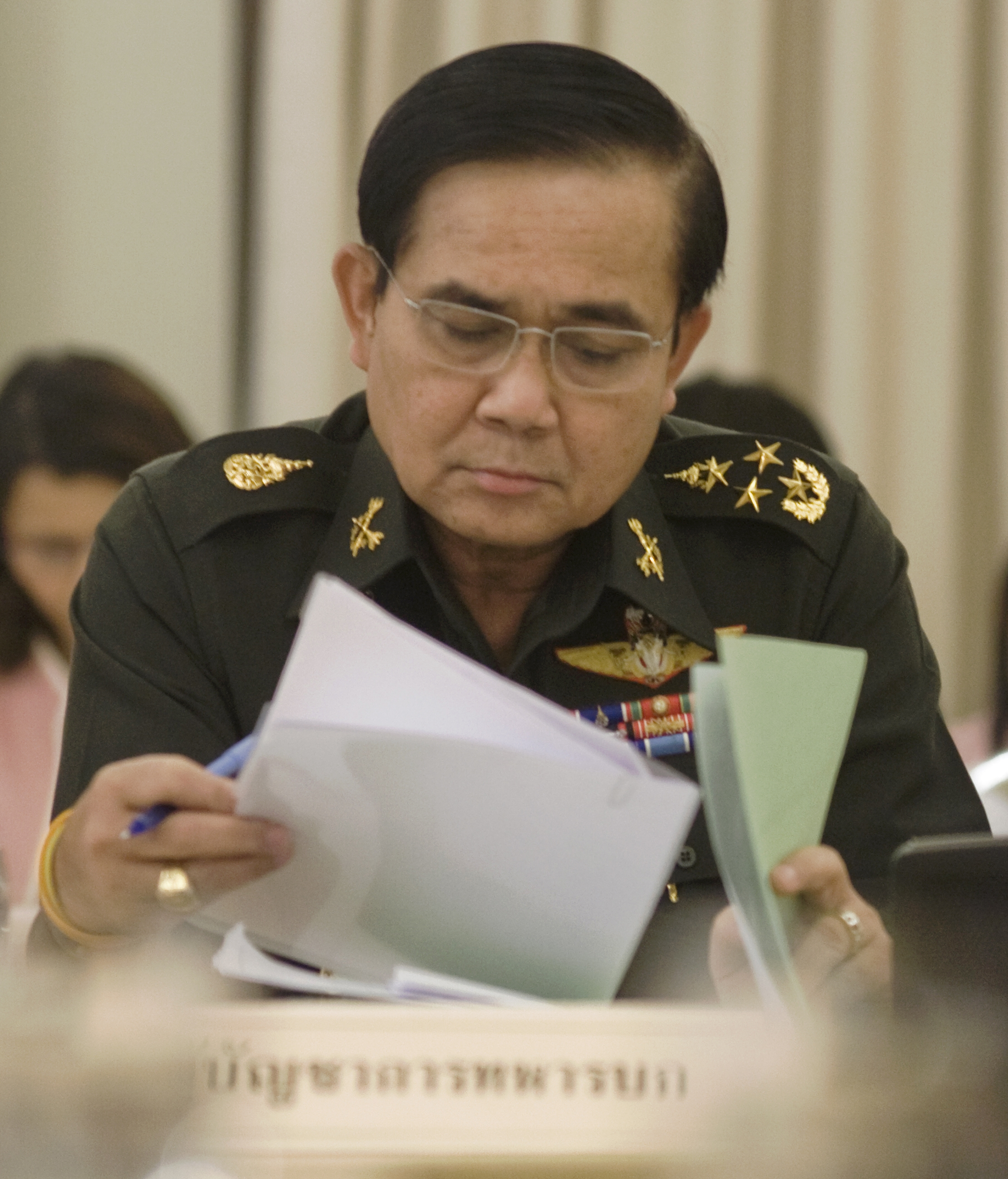
General Prayut Chan-o-cha, RTA Commander

The RTA intervened on 20 May 2014, when its commander, General Prayut, exercised the power under the act promulgated by King Vajiravudh (Rama VI) entitled Martial Law, BE 2457 (1914), to impose martial law nationwide from 03:00. He said through a television pool that the imposition of martial law was due to continuous violence from both sides and was for the purpose of allowing the army to restore and maintain the peace.

After imposing martial law, General Prayut ordered the dissolution of the Centre for Administration of Peace and Order, a police body formed by the caretaker government to resolve the crisis. He then established a Peace and Order Maintaining Command (POMC) with himself as its commander. Charged with the duty to "restore peace to the people from all sides without delay", the POMC was initially given the power to "prevent, suppress, abate and resolve" any situation affecting national security, to enforce every provision of the martial law, and to summon any person. General Prayut also ordered the personnel of the police, navy, air force and Ministry of Defence to be subject to the POMC.

In Bangkok, soldiers were stationed in many places and the main roads were blockaded. The military retook the Government House from the PDRC protesters and seized all television stations in Bangkok and some other parts of the country before shutting down some stations, including those of the PDRC and the Red Shirts. General Prayut later ordered all media to replace their regular programs with the POMC programs whenever he required. and imposed a ban on publishing information which might affect the military's mission. He also directed all government agency chiefs to report to him.

On 21 May 2014, the POMC established an Internet censorship task force and ordered Internet service providers to report to it in order to control online content.

The caretaker government complained that it had not been consulted about the martial law-related decisions of the army. The army claimed that the move was not a coup d'état and that the government remained in office.

=== Unsuccessful talks ===
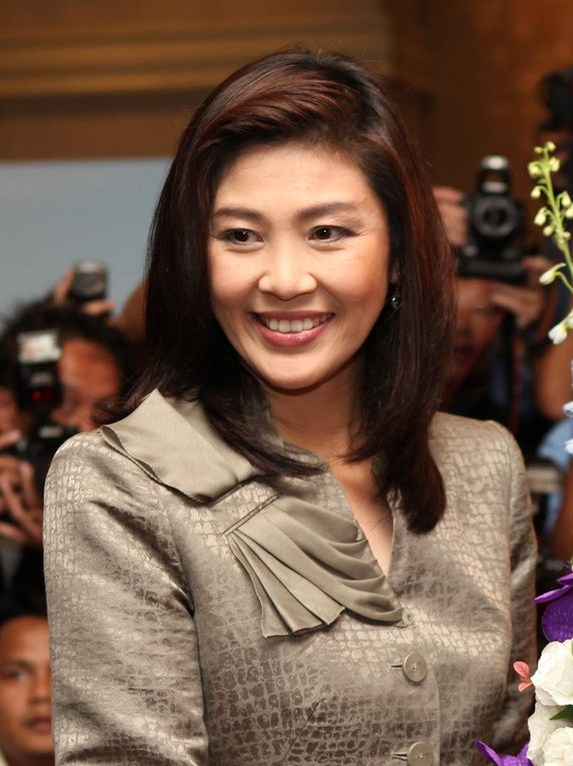
Yingluck Shinawatra, leader of landslide voted government

After its establishment, the POMC held talks with rival groups for two days in an attempt to find resolution. It was reported that the participants were of conflicting opinions and no agreement could be adopted. During talks, the caretaker government was requested by the Election Commission to resign. The government denied the request, saying it was required by the constitution to stay in office. The 2007 constitution prescribed that the cabinet vacates office en bloc upon dissolution of the House of Representatives but it shall remain in office and continue to function until a new cabinet takes office.

On the afternoon of 22 May 2014, the POMC held another talk at the Thai Army Club on Vibhavadi Rangsit Road The talk had proceeded for five hours without reaching agreement, whilst the government maintained that it bore a legal duty to remain in office. At the meeting, General Prayut eventually said to Minister of Justice Chaikasem Nitisiri who led the government representatives: "The talk knows no end because you all only speak about the law. [...] The government insists that it won't resign, right?" Chaikasem replied: "Not at this moment". General Prayut then told the meeting that "Sorry, I must seize power" and ordered the detention of the cabinet members as well as the leaders of the PDRC, Red Shirts, and political parties who attended the talk, much to the dismay of the media representatives who were present. They were held at the headquarters of the 1st Infantry Regiment of the King's Guard, in Phaya Thai District.

== Coup ==
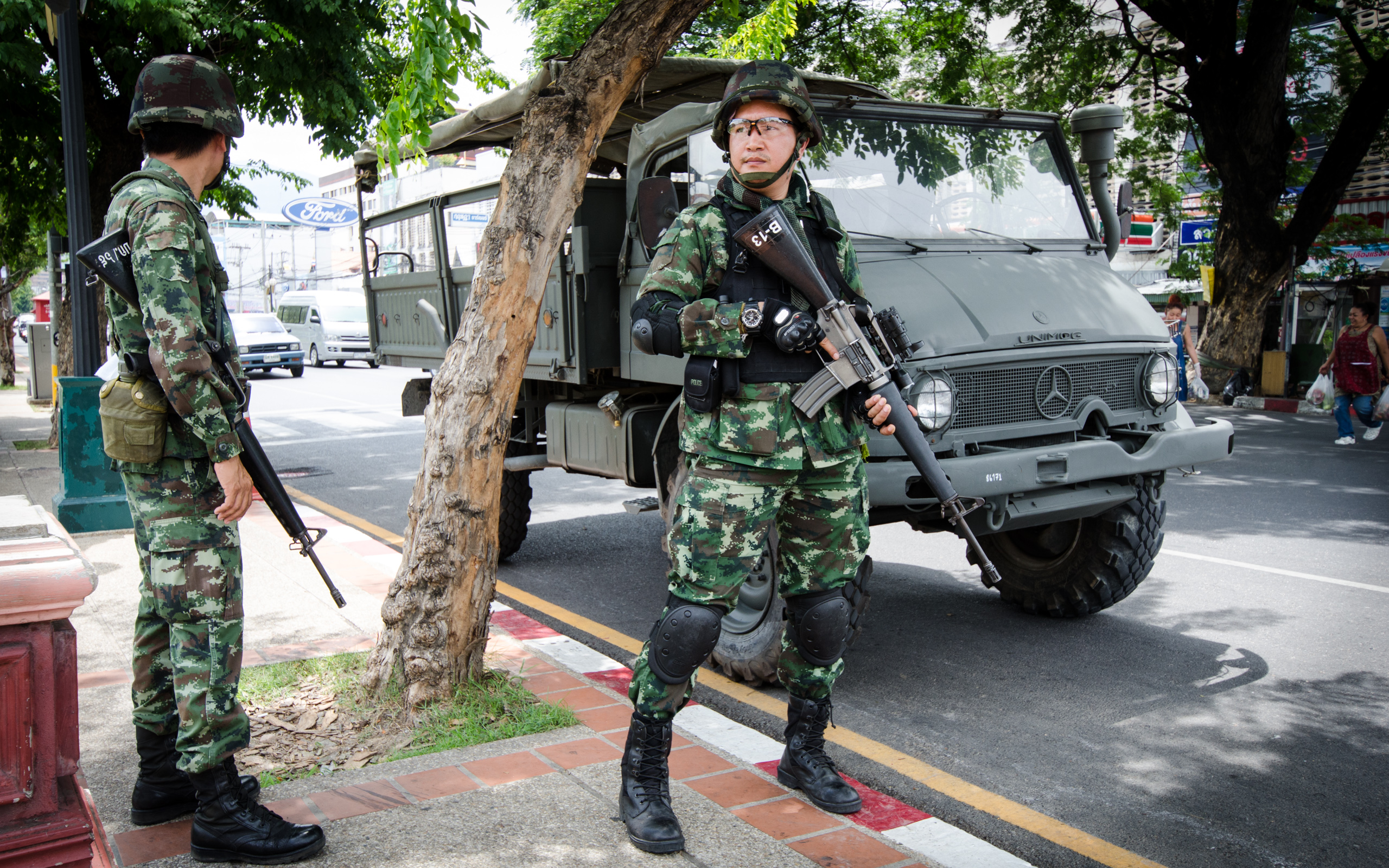
Thai soldiers at the Chang Phueak Gate in Chiang Mai.

=== Launch ===
On the evening of 22 May 2014, General Prayut announced through a televised address that the armed forces were assuming control of national administration, formally launching a coup d'état against the caretaker government and establishing the NCPO to rule the state.

Later that night, the NCPO repealed the 2007 constitution, save the second chapter which deals with the king. In addition, it formally ordered the dissolution of the caretaker government, but the Senate as well as all other state agencies, including the courts and the independent organs, were kept intact. The NCPO declared its composition as follows:

- General Prayut (RTA Commander) as its leader,
- General Thanasak Patimaprakorn (Chief of Defence Forces), Admiral Narong Pipathanasai (Royal Thai Navy Commander), Air Chief Marshal Prajin Juntong (Royal Thai Air Force Commander), and Police General Adul Saengsingkaew (Royal Thai Police Commissioner General), as its deputy leaders,
- General Udomdet Sitabut (RTA Deputy Commander) as its secretary general.

The NCPO then announced that its leader would exercise all powers and duties which the laws invest in the prime minister and the cabinet, until there was a new prime minister. It placed its members in charge of government ministries and equivalent agencies.

On 24 May 2014, the NCPO dissolved the existing Senate and granted legislative powers to its leader. It ordered the judicial branch to operate under its directives. It transferred Police General Adul to an inactive post in the Office of the Prime Minister and replaced him with Police General Watcharapol Prasarnrajkit. Adul was seen as a loyalist of the deposed government.

=== Arrest and detention of public figures ===
Immediately after the coup was launched, caretaker Prime Minister Niwatthamrong, who did not attend the talks, left his office at the Ministry of Commerce so as to avoid being apprehended by the military. The NCPO ordered him and the cabinet members who were not detained to report to the military that day. It was reported that Niwatthamrong attempted to establish a government-in-exile at the United States embassy in Bangkok, but the embassy denied the report.

On the night of 22 May 2014, military officers detained additional politicians, including Chalerm Yubamrung and his sons. The following day, the NCPO summoned PTP members and Shinawatra family members, including Yingluck. Niwatthamrong and Yingluck surrendered themselves to the NCPO on that day. Yingluck was detained at an undisclosed "safe house". The NCPO said it released her on 25 May.

The NCPO later summoned another 114 prominent figures from both sides and stated that those who refused to submit to it would be apprehended and prosecuted. Activist Sombat Boonngamanong, better known as Dotty Editor, was the first person who refused to surrender, saying "Hilarious. Not reporting [to the junta] is considered a criminal offense." He challenged the summons with a post on Facebook: "Catch me if you can". The NCPO responded by stating that on the morning of 24 May, it would send soldiers to apprehend those who failed to appear. One of those apprehended on that day was Panthongtae Shinawatra, a nephew of Yingluck. Sombat was eventually apprehended on 5 June 2014 in Chon Buri Province. The military tracked him down through the Internet, using the IP address he used to post his comments. In addition to two years in jail for violating its orders, the military said Sombat will face seven years of imprisonment on grounds of encouraging people to violate its orders, which are the "law of the nation". The military also said that those who provided refuge to Sombat were to be dealt with by two years in jail on account of "harbouring a criminal".

The NCPO also summoned the Bangkok diplomatic corps to its headquarters. In its summons, it said the corps were merely "invited" to a meeting with the military figures, so that they would have "correct understanding" of its mission. Many foreign ambassadors, including German Ambassador Rolf Peter Schulze, refused to go.

Former Minister of Education Chaturon Chaisaeng was the first person to be tried in a military court for failing to appear as summoned by the NCPO. Soldiers apprehended Chaturon in front of a crowd of foreign journalists immediately after giving a press conference at the Foreign Correspondents' Club of Thailand on 27 May 2014. An NCPO spokesman said that holding a press conference with foreign media was deemed improper and against NCPO policy. Chaturon faced fourteen years of imprisonment in consequence of computer crime charges.

Martial law allows the military to detain people for no more than seven days. The NCPO did not observe the time limit. Some individuals were held incommunicado for more than three weeks.

=== Control of public activities and media ===
Upon announcing the coup, the NCPO laid down a ban on political gatherings and directed all protesters to disperse. It ordered all educational institutes, both public and private, to close from 23 to 25 May 2014. It imposed a curfew throughout the country, ordering people to stay indoors from 22:00 to 05:00. The curfew time was later changed to 24:00 to 04:00 hours, effective 28 May 2014. The curfew was lifted in most parts of the country on 13 June 2014.

The NCPO ordered all television and radio stations to stop airing their regular programs and to broadcast RTA programs only. It detained Wanchai Tantiwittayapitak, deputy director of the Thai Public Broadcasting Service which operates Thai PBS station, after he permitted the station to live broadcast a special program about the coup on YouTube instead of television. On the program, several scholars, including Chulalongkorn University lecturer Gothom Arya, were interviewed and gave negative comments on the coup. Thai PBS said Wanchai was taken to the First Army Area headquarters to "tune in understanding between the media and army".

On 23 May 2014, the NCPO summoned all media chiefs to the Thai Army Club and ordered Internet service providers to censor any information deemed provocative, causing public disturbance, containing official secrets, likely detrimental to national security, or defamatory to the NCPO. It threatened to shut down social media if its operator failed to block information inciting unrest or inciting "opposition to peacekeeping".

On the afternoon of 23 May, analogue television networks, except Thai PBS, were allowed to resume their normal programming, after the NCPO ordered the Internet service providers to block all broadcast sharing attempts on the Internet and instructed the National Broadcasting and Telecommunications Commission to shut down Internet-based television. All digital television networks were permitted to resume broadcasts the following day.

On 24 May 2014, media organisations issued an open letter urging the NCPO to end the restriction of press freedom as soon as possible. The NCPO responded by summoning all media operators, instructing them that they were required to attend a meeting with the NCPO first.

== Aftermath ==
=== Future roles ===
The NCPO stated on 23 May 2014 that it aimed to conduct national "economic, social and political" reforms before elections were permitted. It said a reform council and a national assembly will be set up to work on the reforms. It also said it wanted to handle, inter alia, the rice pledge project problems, and will carry out a project of constructing roads on both banks of the Chao Phraya River. The road construction project was originally initiated by the PTP in 2012 and was part of a flood control project.

General Prayut said he would run the country until the situation required an interim government. In administering the country, he said he will use the military command and control systems which he believed would develop the country. The NCPO announced that its leader would determine national administrative policies, both "short-term and long-term".

Unlike previous coups, there were no promises of a quick return to civilian rule. On 26 May, the NCPO held a press conference at which a Thai Rath journalist asked General Prayut if he would become the new prime minister himself. Prayut did not refuse, answering, "It is already in the plan." Another journalist, from the Bangkok Post, asked when an election would happen. Prayut replied, "[An election] depends on the situation. [There is] no deadline. That's enough", before walking out of the conference room. The following day, both journalists were summoned by the NCPO on grounds of "giving questions that lessen public confidence in the ruler".

An NCPO spokesman also said that normal democratic principles could not be applied at the current time. The Sydney Morning Herald reported that the military's decisions showed that General Prayut is preparing "a long-term pervasive takeover without the calling of quick elections".

On 29 May 2014, Lieutenant General Chatchalerm Chalermsukh, deputy army chief of staff, told reporters at a press conference in Bangkok, that while elections would be held, there was no timetable. "Right conditions" would have to be put in place before an election took place, he said. A day later, in a national television address, General Prayut said elections would not be held for at least fifteen months. He warned against resistance to the military and called on all sides to co-operate and stop protesting.

Some observers believe that elections are being postponed due to issues of succession to the throne of Thailand. The king's "...death will shake Thailand like nothing has in its modern history, and the Thai military wants to be firmly in charge when that happens. It is that simple."

=== Royal endorsement ===
On 24 May 2014, the NCPO said King Bhumibol Adulyadej had acknowledged the coup, but stopped short of describing the response as an endorsement. However, on 26 May 2014, the king formally appointed General Prayut to run the country. In Thailand, the monarchy is highly respected, and royal endorsement was seen as legitimation of the takeover.

=== Lèse majesté cases ===
At a press conference on 23 May 2014, the NCPO said one of its missions is to "severely" deal with lèse majesté offenders in Thailand and ordered governmental officers to support this mission.

On 25 May 2014, the NCPO authorised military courts to try all cases concerning lèse majesté, sedition, national security, and violation of NCPO orders.

On that day, the NCPO searched the residence of Somyot Prueksakasemsuk, an imprisoned magazine editor sentenced in 2013 to 11 years in jail for lèse majesté. The NCPO detained his wife, who had been campaigning for political prisoners, and his son, a fourth year student at the Faculty of Law, Thammasat University. Other critics of the lèse majesté law were detained as well.

The NCPO later summoned a number of exiled activists accused of lèse majesté, including former Chulalongkorn University political science lecturer Giles Ji Ungpakorn and former minister Jakrapob Penkair. They were ordered to appear by 9 June 2014.

=== Interim constitution ===
An interim constitution was enacted on 22 July 2014, paving the way for the establishment of a national legislature, a provisional government, and a reform council. The draft interim constitution originally required that a draft new constitution be approved by the citizens in a nationwide referendum before it is forwarded to the king for his signature. The requirement was disapproved by the NCPO and was deleted. Wissanu Krea-ngam, a Chulalongkorn University law lecturer who drafted the interim constitution, explained that the requirement was deleted to avoid "lengthy process".

=== Rise of fascism ===
The rise of fascism in Thailand began around the coup, first identified by James Taylor of University of Adelaide in 2011, after the junta took control, academics and political commentators started to identify this prevalent political movement as fascism. Pithaya Pookaman and James Taylor called it 'New Right', consisting of ultraconservatives, reactionaries, semi-fascists, pseudo-intellectuals and former leftists. John Draper, an academic and political commentator, noted that the rise of fascism in Thailand began in 2014. The King's sufficient economy was mentioned that it serves as one of the ideological foundations of the military regime, and reminiscent of fascist regimes in Europe in the 1930s.

=== 2017 constitution ===
In the run-up to the 7 August 2016 referendum on the new constitution, the army conducted a "grassroots information campaign." There was no debate permitted on its merits. Under the junta's rules, "people who propagate information deemed distorted, violent, aggressive, inciting or threatening so that voters do not vote or vote in a particular way" faced up to 10 years in jail and a fine of up to 200,000 baht. The 105-page, 279-article proposed constitution was approved by 61.4 percent of Thai voters on 7 August 2016 with 59.4 percent of the public participating. Under the proposed constitution, Parliament is bicameral, consisting of a 250-member nominated Senate and a 500-member House of Representatives of whom 350 are elected from single-member constituencies, and 150 members from party lists. The proposed constitution also allows the NCPO to appoint an eight to ten person panel who will choose Senators, to include six seats reserved for the heads of the Royal Thai Army, Navy, Air Force, and Police, plus the military's supreme commander, and defense permanent secretary. The bicameral Parliament could also select a candidate as Prime Minister who is not one of its members or even a politician. That person could become Prime Minister if the appointed Senate approves. Some suspect that with the new constitution the military seeks to hobble political parties in order to create disposable coalition governments. The military would then retain the real power, whatever the outcome of the referendum and the election.

== Domestic responses ==
=== Pro- and anti-government protesters ===
Many PDRC protesters lauded the announcement of the coup at their rally sites. Phra Buddha Issara, a then Buddhist monk and PDRC co-leader, went on stage to proclaim the victory of the anti-Shinawatra government protesters before requesting that his followers disperse and go home. Soldiers took over the pro-government protest sites and fired shots in the air to disperse protesters.

The last group of protesters left Bangkok on the evening of 23 May 2014. The NCPO provided 70 military vehicles to carry the protesters from both sides home.

=== Anti-coup ===
==== Public protests ====
In spite of a ban on political gatherings of more than five persons, demonstrators, including Thammasat University students, marched to the Democracy Monument on 23 May 2014 to express their anger at the coup. However the military stopped them from reaching the monument, citing fear of violence and clashes.

On the same day, separate protests took place outside the Bangkok Art and Culture Centre, led by freelance media, artists, and social activists. Soldiers sent by the NCPO detained the protesters. A live round was fired and the whereabouts of those apprehended was not known.

On 24 May 2014, a group held an anti-coup protest in front of Major Ratchayothin Cinema in Bangkok, where a company of troops with riot shields was stationed. On that evening, another group of at least 1,000 protesters marched to the Victory Monument. The military tried to stop their procession, using a police truck. Some of the protesters were apprehended but were released after negotiation.

At midday on 25 May 2014, a group of anti-coup protesters gathered in front of a McDonald's restaurant at Ratchaprasong, in the heart of Bangkok. Soldiers arrived and seized the area. Another group of people tried to march from the Victory Monument to the Pathum Wan intersection protesting the coup. The military managed to block them.

Anti-coup protests also took place outside Bangkok. In Chiang Mai Province, a group of people clad in black held anti-coup activities for days, including marching to the city's ancient walls where they performed a candle-lit ceremony opposing the military's action. Some of them were apprehended by military on 24 May. Anti-coup rallies also occurred in several other provinces. In Khon Kaen Province, students held a ceremony to bid farewell to democracy in front of Central Plaza Khon Kaen shopping mall where soldiers were stationed. In Maha Sarakham Province, students held an anti-coup protest in the middle of the city but soldiers came and seized protest materials such as banners. A group of Thais living in Australia held anti-coup activities at Kings Park, Perth, on 26 May.

A number of anti-coup activists outside Bangkok were later summoned by regional military courts and were detained without charges.

On 10 June 2014, Chalard Vorachat, a retired pilot officer and renowned hunger striker, sued the NCPO before the Criminal Court. Chalard alleged that the NCPO, by staging the coup, committed insurrection. The court dismissed the case, ruling that Chalard was not the victim and was therefore not entitled to institute the case, although Chalard claimed that he was the victim because his rights and liberties had been affected by the coup.

==== Online activities ====
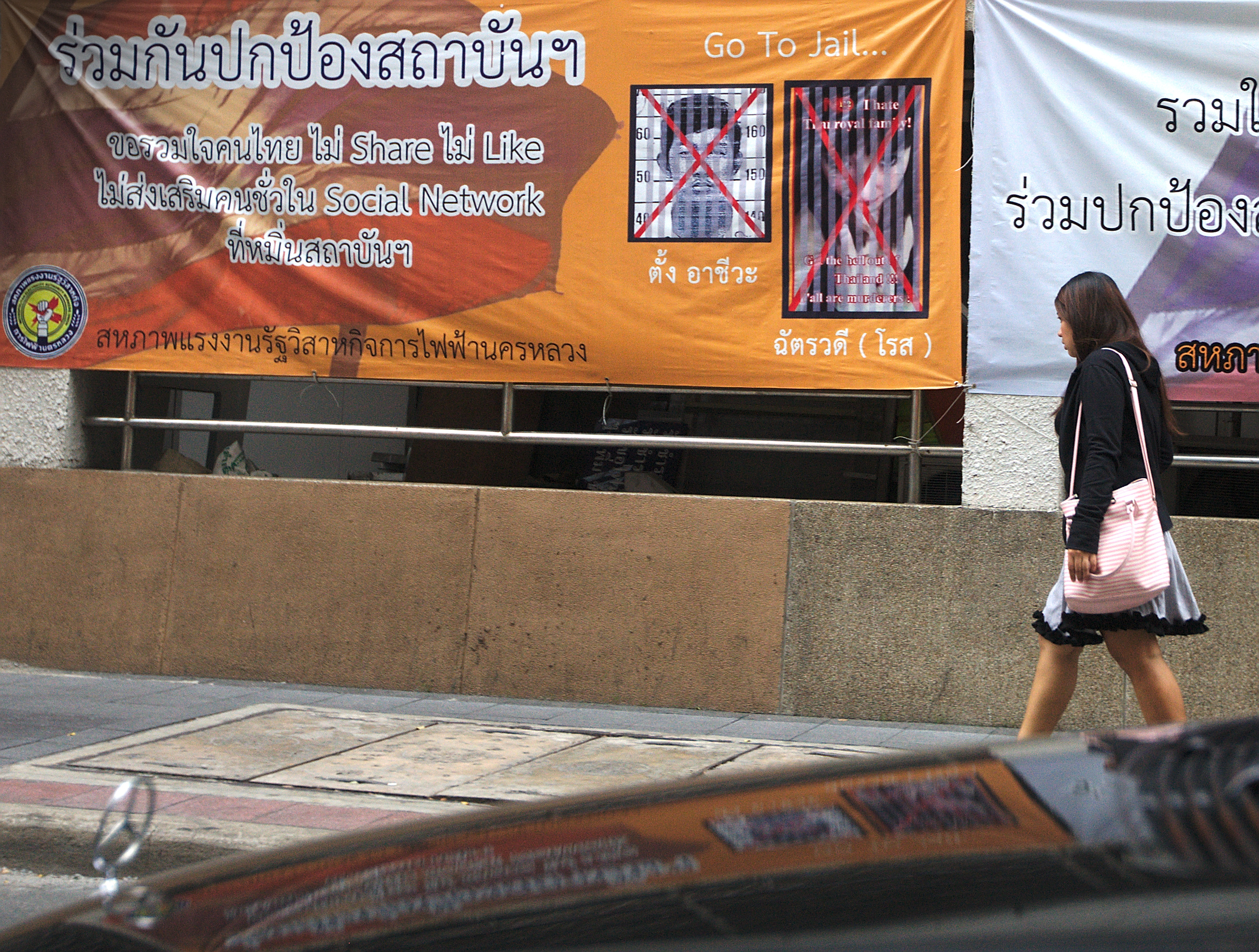
A banner in Bangkok, observed on 3 June 2014, informs the public that "liking" or "sharing" the activity of those who openly disrespect the Monarchy on social media could land them in prison. The banner says this is "for the sake of the monarchy". near Chit Lom, Bangkok, Thailand on 2014-06-30. The woman in the right side of the picture is Chatwadee Amornpat, known as 'London Rose' who has openly insulted the Monarchy.

Anti-coup sentiment was also echoed on Thai social media such as Facebook, Twitter, and LINE, even though the military had previously warned that it would block social media if material critical of the coup was published.

A reporter, Pornthip Mongyai, was dismissed by her news agency, Mono Group, after a photo of Pornthip, wearing a press armband, stood next to a line of soldiers with an "X" taped over her lips, went viral on the Internet.

In response to anti-coup activities on social media, the NCPO ordered the Ministry of Information and Communication Technology (MICT) to block Facebook in Thailand "from time to time", effective from 28 May 2014. On that evening, Facebook was blocked for about an hour throughout the country. The MICT stated on 24 May that more than 100 URLs have been blocked under martial law.

People calling for protests on social media were warned that they will face prosecution for sedition. The military also said that liking an anti-coup page on Facebook constituted a criminal offence.

==== Anti-coup symbols ====
Thai coup protesters used a salute consisting of three fingers symbolising their opposition to the coup; it was inspired originally from The Hunger Games film series, but it was later extended to represent the ideas of liberty, equality and brotherhood. The military announced that it would arrest anyone who displayed the salute. The salute would later become a prominent symbol of the 2020 pro-democracy protests.

Protesters then adopted the sandwich as their new anti-coup symbol. They handed out sandwiches, shouting "sandwiches for democracy!". On 22 June 2014, a student eating sandwiches in front of Siam Paragon and a group of students who were to organise a sandwich activity at the same venue were apprehended and were later placed in detention.

Apart from using the three-finger salute and eating sandwiches in public, two other acts of expressing anti-coup stance have been criminalised: reading George Orwell's Nineteen Eighty-Four in public, and wearing shirts with certain slogans such as "Peace Please" and "Respect My Vote".

Private citizens performing other symbolic acts were also apprehended and detained. These included: an aged woman wearing a mask with the word "People", a man shouting "I'm a common citizen who feels shame because there's another coup in my country", a fried squid vendor wearing a red shirt, a group of people covering their eyes, ears, and mouths, a group of movie commentators and artistic activists intending to organise the displaying of the film Nineteen Eighty-Four, a group of people holding activities in front of Wat Phra Si Mahathat, a temple in Bangkok, to commemorate the transition of absolute monarchy to constitutional monarchy in the Siamese revolution of 1932, a student playing "La Marseillaise" in public, a group of people holding papers asking "Where are the people?", and a man holding a paper saying "Holding papers is not a crime". All were to be tried in military courts for sedition.

=== Pro-coup ===
On 25 May 2014, a pro-coup group held a counter-rally at the Democracy Monument calling on the NCPO to conduct reforms before a general election. The following day, a group of officials from the Ministry of Foreign Affairs held a similar rally.

=== Political parties ===
Democrat Party leader Abhisit Vejjajiva said on 25 May 2014 that he was sorry that he could not protect democracy. The following day, he urged the NCPO to take tough measures against anti-coup groups.

=== Academic and religious sectors ===
The coup met with strong reactions from Thai academics, with the majority expressing serious concern over its negative impact on Thailand's democracy and human rights.

A group of university lecturers, who call themselves the Assembly for the Defence of Democracy (AFDD), issued a statement on 23 May 2014, emphasizing the right of the people to offer resistance to an illegitimate ruler and requesting the military to promptly release the detained protesters. In its statement, the AFDD said,

A good ruler shall not rule by force. He must be accepted by the public, must gain public consent, must keep his words, and must acquire faith and trust from everyone. If the NCPO treats the people as its enemy and keeps on suppressing them by force, it will face endless resistance and will have to suppress countless people. Eventually, there will be no one left to be ruled.

On that day, AFDD members gathered in front of the Dome Building of Thammasat University to express their anti-coup stance. The scholars from the Midnight University also issued a statement denouncing the coup and demanding the resignation of the National Human Rights Commission.

The academic sector also called on NCPO members to disclose their financial interests to the public. However, the National Anti-Corruption Commission said that it is not required by any law.

On 26 May 2014, Phra Paisal Visalo, a monk renowned for his roles in human rights protection, denounced the coup, saying "Even though this coup brought an end to some urgent problems..., it is the beginning of new various problems which are surely more serious".

In response to heavy opposition from the academic sector, military officers were stationed at some higher education institutions to prevent academics from expressing political opinions or holding political activities. These included Thammasat University's Tha Pra Chan Campus in Bangkok.

The NCPO summoned leading pro-democracy scholars. Despite the NCPO threatening that those failing to show up would face criminal penalties, the summoned said they would not submit to the military. A number of scholars who failed to appear were later apprehended, such as Thammasat University law lecturer Sawatree Suksri who was apprehended at Suvarnabhumi Airport on 7 June 2014 after travelling back from the United States on a US embassy study trip about human rights.

The military also ordered Thai diplomats to take measures to force the return of exiled academicians. One of the targets was Pavin Chachavalpongpun, a Thai associate professor at Kyoto University who challenged the summons by asking if he could send his pet chihuahua to meet with General Prayut in his stead. Pavin claimed that the Thai ambassador in Tokyo and consul general in Osaka had both been told by the military that if they failed to force Pavin to return, they would either be transferred or forced out of the foreign service. On 13 June 2014, the NCPO issued an arrest warrant against Pavin.

== International responses ==
=== Government sector ===
==== Supranational ====
- EU
  - The Council of the European Union concluded on 23 June 2014 that the EU and its member states will not sign the partnership and cooperation agreement with Thailand, until a democratically elected government is in place, and that other agreements will also be affected as appropriate.
  - The European External Action Service called for the military to accept and respect the constitutional authority of the civilian power and stressed "the importance of holding credible and inclusive elections as soon as feasible".
- UN
  - Ban Ki-moon, Secretary-General of the United Nations, issued a statement through his spokesman, expressing concern over the coup, calling for "a prompt return to constitutional, civilian, democratic rule" and movement towards cooperation between the parties.
  - Navi Pillay, United Nations High Commissioner for Human Rights, condemned the coup. She said her office has monitored the situations for the past five months and she is "deeply concerned about the forcible replacement of an elected government, the imposition of martial law, the suspension of the constitution and the emergency measures that are restricting the enjoyment of human rights". She also urged prompt restoration of rule of law in the country.

==== Countries ====
- Argentina – The Argentine Foreign Affairs Ministry and the Argentine Embassy in Bangkok demanded an "immediate return to the constitutional order in Thailand".
- Australia – Australian Foreign Minister Julie Bishop expressed that she was "gravely concerned" over the military coup and described the situation as "volatile". She also urged Australian travellers to exercise caution and pay close attention to their security, there are an estimated 5000+ Australians currently in Thailand.

- Cambodia – Cambodian government officials expressed concerns that tensions could rise at the Cambodia–Thailand border, where a dispute has been ongoing since 2008. Council of Ministers spokesman Phay Siphan said "We wish to see this [coup] not jeopardizing democratic transition, maintaining peace and stability, and still respecting [and safeguarding] the will and interest of the Thai people" while adding that nothing is expected to change at the Cambodia–Thailand border. Siphan also said that the government would always respect the mutual interests of the two countries.
- Canada – Foreign Affairs Minister John Baird condemned the coup and said: "This decision violates Thailand's democratic principles and stands in stark contrast to the Army's earlier assurances that its role would be limited to securing public order. We hope and expect the Thai military will return Thailand to civilian rule as soon as possible, respect democratic processes and the rule of law, ensure freedom of expression and assembly, and guarantee due process for those who have been detained."
- Chile – The Foreign Affairs Ministry issued a statement condemning the coup and saying that they "trust that the political crisis affecting the partner and friendly nation and its people, can be quickly and peacefully resolved through means that will allow the recovery of democratic coexistence".
- China – Foreign Ministry issued a brief statement expressing its concern over the situation and hoped for the order to be restored in Thailand.
- Colombia – The Foreign Affairs Ministry, through a press release, reiterated its concern about the current situation in the "allied nation" of Thailand and condemned the "break of the institutional order that was caused by the coup". Colombia called for dialogue, between the public armed forces and the Kingdom of Thailand, in order to reestablish a participative Democracy while also "advocating for the constitutional rights of all Thai citizens."
- France – President François Hollande condemned the coup and called for "an immediate return to the constitutional order and for a vote to be organised".
- Germany – German Minister for Foreign Affairs Frank-Walter Steinmeier issued a statement condemning the coup, calling for the rapid holding of elections and restoration of constitutional protections.
- Indonesia – In a statement issued by Foreign Minister Marty Natalegawa, Indonesia "calls upon the Armed Forces of Thailand and various relevant civilian elements to work together in a reconciliatory atmosphere to quickly restore the political situation in Thailand". He also states that Indonesia will communicate with Myanmar, which is ASEAN chairperson for 2014 to "mobilize ASEAN's contribution in establishing a condition conducive for the restoration of political condition in Thailand".
- Japan – Fumio Kishida, the Japanese Minister of Foreign Affairs, issued a statement calling for the rapid restoration of democracy in Thailand.
- Malaysia – The Ministry of Foreign Affairs advised Malaysian citizens to avoid travelling to Thailand for the time being and postpone any non-essential visits to the country. Malaysian citizens present in Thailand are also advised to abide by the curfew for personal safety and security reasons. Meanwhile, former Prime Minister Mahathir Mohamad had commented that the coup in Thailand will not affect Malaysia politically or economically, saying that since independence in 1957 Malaysians have been law-abiding citizens.
- Philippines – Department of Foreign Affairs spokesman Charles Jose said "the Philippines supports a peaceful resolution of the present situation" and "hopes for an early return to normalcy consistent with democratic principles, the rule of law and the will and interest of the Thai people."
- Russia – The Russian Ministry of Foreign Affairs called for a prompt return of the political process and constitutional protections.
- South Africa – The South African government, through its spokesman Clayson Monyela, condemned the coup and called on "all relevant parties to work speedily and through an inclusive process towards the restoration of constitutional order".
- Singapore – A spokesperson for the Singaporean Ministry of Foreign Affairs expressed "grave concern" over the coup.
- Turkey – The Ministry of Foreign Affairs of Turkey stated that, "We regret the decision of the Thai armed forces to suspend the constitution and take control of the government. Turkey, as a matter of principle, is opposed to the dismissal of governments that have come to power by popular vote, by non-democratic methods.
- United Kingdom – Foreign Secretary William Hague issued a statement urging "the restoration of a civilian government that has been democratically elected, serves the interests of its people and fulfils its human rights obligations". The Foreign Office announced that it would review military ties with Thailand and cancelled a number of military visits.
- United States – Secretary of State John Kerry issued a statement condemning the coup, saying that he is "disappointed" by the army's decision and "this act will have negative implications for the U.S.–Thai relationship, especially for our relationship with the Thai military." The Cobra Gold joint military drill proceeded, but military aid was suspended.
- Vietnam – Vietnamese government representatives traveled to Thailand to meet with representatives of the Thai government as a show of support for the change of government.

=== Non-governmental sector ===
- A group of Thai studies scholars from twenty universities in Australia, Canada, Denmark, Japan, Malaysia, Singapore, the United Kingdom and the United States jointly published an open letter in which they said, "You [General Prayut] requested that citizens 'carry out their lives and occupation as usual', but nothing could be normal about the political and social conditions put in place by the coup. The coup cannot be a measure for peace because the coup itself is the use of violence." They called on the NCPO to return immediately to constitutional rule by a civilian government and to provide a concrete timeline for such return.
- Amnesty International (AI) issued a statement saying that arresting peaceful anti-coup activists is a "dangerous precedent" and "maintaining public order cannot be an excuse for violating human rights." It also urged the NCPO to clarify the whereabouts of those arrested and detained. AI later denounced the military action against leading anti-coup activist Sombat Boonngamanong, describing it as part of "a systematic and widening crackdown on key human rights". Its Asian director Richard Bennett said "This is the latest in a disturbing wave of arrests of people purely voicing disquiet about the military regime. The army's course of action is looking increasingly like a purge."
- The Asian Human Rights Commission condemned the NCPO for threatening academics and activists, called for the immediate release of the detainees, and expressed grave concern over the rapid decline of human rights protections in the country.
- Human Rights Watch described the NCPO's actions as the exercise of "draconian martial law powers" and called for the immediate end thereof. Its Asian director Brad Adams said, "The Thai army needs to recognize that the government should be determined by the ballot, not the bullet."
- Noam Chomsky said he was "deeply disturbed to learn about the threats against Professor Pavin Chachavalpongpun" and hoped that those threats will quickly be withdrawn and that Pavin can "resume his life without government repression".
- Stars of the Hunger Games showed their support for anti-coup protesters who have been using the films' three-fingered salute as a way of showing opposition. One of the cast members, Natalie Dormer, described the use of the salute as "incredible" and said "Anything that galvanises people in a positive way to fight against oppression cannot be criticised in any shape or form."
- W. Scott Thompson, American author, wrote that the coup might be justified to restore Thai democracy. He argued that at least the coup would restore order and transition to democracy, while the Thaksin regime would certainly have doomed it.

== Impacts ==
The United States suspended US$3.5m in military aid to Thailand from its overall aid package of US$10.5 million and cancelled military engagements, including military visits and training. It also urged tourists to cancel trips and halted non-essential visits by its governmental officers.

Some border checkpoints between Thailand and neighbouring states were closed following the coup.

The Ministry of Tourism and Sports said on 27 May that the arrival of "foreign tourists dropped by 20%".

The coup also resulted in the cancellation of American singer-songwriter Taylor Swift's concert for The Red Tour, formerly scheduled on 9 June 2014, in Bangkok, and the postponement of several events, including USA Fair 2014 scheduled for 30 May–2 June 2014.

Asia Sentinel reported on 9 June 2014 that Thai rights groups estimated that some 200 people remained in detention since the coup happened.

After the NCPO vowed on 11 June 2014 to deal with illegal foreign workers in Thailand, saying "we see illegal workers as a threat", a very large number of foreign migrants, more than half of whom were women and children, left the country the same day. The International Organization for Migration described the event as a "sudden influx" and expressed its concern. The BBC reported on 16 June 2014 that more than 180,000 Cambodians fled Thailand after the NCPO announced the crackdown. A group of Cambodians died in a car accident on their way to the border and this enraged the Cambodian government, which said the Thai military must be held responsible for all the problems that have occurred. Burmese migrants in northern Thailand were arrested and were released only after a "protection fee" was paid. Rights groups said employers in southern Thailand had also advised their foreign workers to go into hiding in the woods or rubber plantations to avoid arrest.

== See also ==
- 2005–2006 Thai political crisis
- 2006 Thai coup d'état
- Public opinion of the 2006 Thai coup d'état
- 2008 Thai political crisis
- 2009 Thai political unrest
- 2010 Thai political protests
- 2010 Thai military crackdown
- 2013–2014 Thai political crisis
- 2014 interim constitution of Thailand
- 2019 Thai general election
- 2020–2021 Thai protests
- List of coups d'état and coup attempts by country (Thailand)
- Human rights in Thailand
- COINTELPRO
