= Wissanu Krea-ngam =

Thai lawyer and politician (born 1951)

- วิษณุ เครืองาม
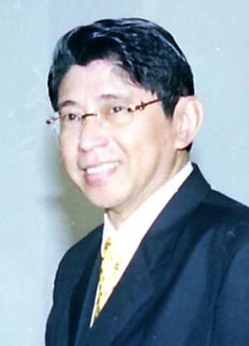
- Wissanu Krea-ngam in New Delhi on 16 December 2003

Adviser to the Prime Minister of Thailand
- In office 30 May 2024 – 16 August 2024
- Prime Minister: Srettha Thavisin

Deputy Prime Minister of Thailand
- In office 30 August 2014 – 1 September 2023
- Prime Minister: Prayut Chan-o-cha
- In office 3 October 2002 – 24 June 2006
- Prime Minister: Thaksin Shinawatra

Secretary-General to the Cabinet
- In office 1 October 1996 – 30 September 2002
- Prime Minister: Banharn Silpa-archa; Chavalit Yongchaiyudh; Chuan Leekpai; Thaksin Shinawatra
- Preceded by: Bodee Junnanon
- Succeeded by: Borwornsak Uwanno

Personal details
- Born: September 15, 1951 (age 75) Hat Yai, Songkhla, Thailand
- Party: Independent
- Education: Thammasat University; UC Berkeley (Ph.D.)
- Profession: Politician; jurist; professor

Wissanu Krea-ngam (Thai: วิษณุ เครืองาม, RTGS: Witsanu Khruea-ngam, pronounced [wít.sā.núʔ kʰrɯ̄a̯.ŋāːm]; born 15 September 1951) is a Thai jurist, professor, and politician. He was the secretary-general of the cabinet from 1993 to 2002 and deputy prime minister under Thaksin Shinawatra from 2002 to 2006. After the 2014 Thai coup d'état, he served as an advisor to the military junta (National Council for Peace and Order, NCPO) responsible for drafting the post-coup 2014 interim constitution. From August 2014 to September 2023, he has again been deputy prime minister under General Prayut Chan-o-cha.

== Life and career ==
Wissanu was born in Hat Yai District, Songkhla Province. He is a fourth generation Thai Chinese. He studied law at the Faculty of Law, Thammasat University, graduating with an honours degree, and was admitted to the bar by the Thai Bar Association. He continued his studies in the United States, completing his Master of Laws (1974) and Doctor of Juridical Science (1976) from the University of California, Berkeley. Moreover, he completed a course at the National Defence College of Thailand.

He lectured law at Ramkhamhaeng, Thammasat, and Chulalongkorn Universities. In 1986 he was appointed professor of law at Chulalongkorn University. In 1991 he transferred to become the deputy secretary-general of the cabinet. In 1993 he was promoted to secretary-general, the highest-ranking civil servant advising the cabinet on legal affairs. After frequent changes in that position during the early-1990s, Wissanu held the post for more than a decade, surviving four changes of government.

In 2002 Prime Minister Thaksin Shinawatra invited Wissanu to become a minister in his cabinet, changing from the civil service to a political career, but also threatened to dismiss him as secretary-general in case of refusal. Wissanu agreed and Thaksin made him deputy prime minister, responsible for legal and parliamentary affairs. At that time, Thaksin had seven deputy prime ministers. Wissanu's successor as secretary-general of the cabinet was his personal friend Borwornsak Uwanno. During the 2005–06 Thai political crisis and after the dissolution of parliament, both Wissanu and Borwornsak resigned their government posts.

After the 19 September 2006 military coup, he helped the military junta (Council for Democratic Reform under the Constitutional Monarchy, CDR) draft a post-coup interim constitution, alongside Borwornsak Uwanno. According to political scientist Thitinan Pongsudhirak, Borwornsak and Wissanu could "seemingly write constitutions overnight". Wissanu then became a member of the military-appointed National Legislative Assembly. During and after this time, he continued to teach at the Chulalongkorn University.

Wissanu has served as chairman of the university council of Songkhla Rajabhat University and member of the councils of Chiang Mai, Thaksin, Kasem Bundit, Chulalongkorn, Chiang Rai Rajabhat, and Prince of Songkla Universities, as well as the council of King Prajadhipok's Institute.

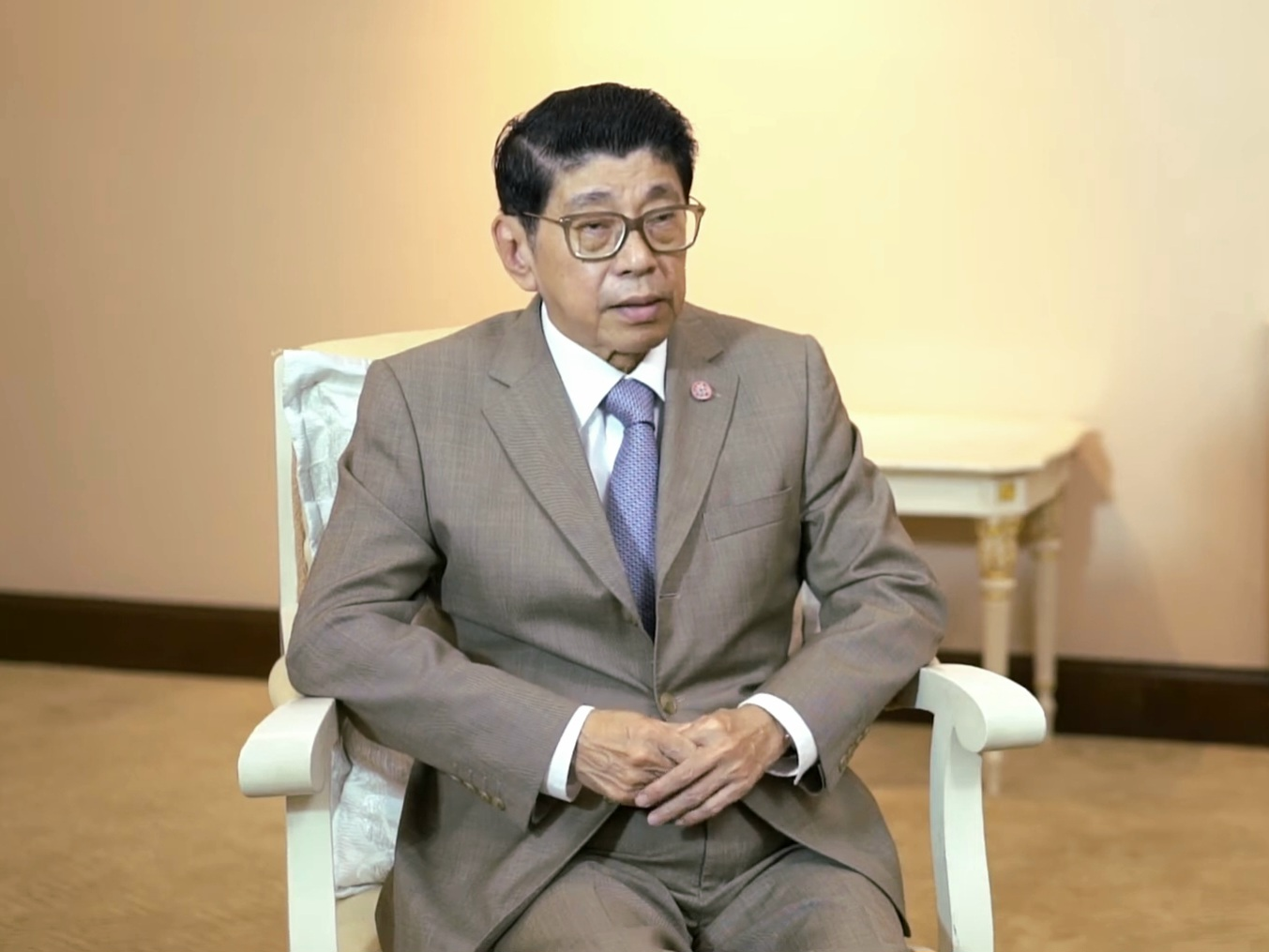
Wissanu in 2020

Since 2009 he has been the chairman of the SET-listed property developer Amata Corporation pcl and an independent director since 2007. Moreover, he has held executive positions in the private sector as chairman of BFIT Securities pcl and as its director (since 2008), chairman of Bangkok First Investment & Trust pcl (2008–2014), chairman of Namyong Terminal pcl, chairman of Sikarin pcl (2006–2014) and as its director (since 2006), chairman of RHB OSK Securities (Thailand) pcl (since 2008) and as its director (2008–2011), vice chairman of AEC Securities pcl and as its independent director (since 2013), second vice chairman of Sermsuk pcl (2011–2014) and as its director, as an independent director of The Post Publishing pcl (until 2014), an independent director of Loxley PLC (2008–2014) and as a director at Thai Airways International pcl.

== Academic analysis ==
Political scientist Eugénie Mérieau cites Wissanu Krea-ngam, along with Meechai Ruchuphan and Borwornsak Uwanno, as leading examples of legal scholars who laid the juridical foundations for authoritarian rule in Thailand, and as exponents of a "legal-military alliance for illiberal constitutionalism." Wissanu, according to Mérieau, is a proponent of theories that legalised coups d'état "by reference to the continuity of the Thai state as embodied by the king".

== Royal decorations ==
Wissanu has received the following decorations and awards in the Honours System of Thailand:

- Knight Grand Cordon (Special Class) of the Order of the White Elephant
- Knight Grand Cordon (Special Class) of the Order of the Crown of Thailand
- Knight Grand Cross (First Class) of the Order of the Direkgunabhorn
- Knight Grand Commander (Second Class, Upper Grade) of the Order of Chula Chom Klao
