= Bundhit Eua-arporn =

Thai academic (born 1965)

- บัณฑิต เอื้ออาภรณ์

17th President of Chulalongkorn University
- In office 18 May 2016 – 17 May 2024
- Preceded by: Pirom Kamolratanakul
- Succeeded by: Wilert Puriwat

Bundhit Eua-arporn (Thai: บัณฑิต เอื้ออาภรณ์, RTGS: Bandit Uea-aphon; born 22 July 1965) is a Thai academic who served as the 17th president of Chulalongkorn University from 2016 to 2024. He previously served as a member of executive board of Banpu Power Public Company Limited until 2024.

== Other positions held ==
- Board Member, National Reform Committee in Energy, National Reform Committee (2017)
- Honorary Board Member, Thailand Institute of Scientific and Technological Research (2015 - 2016)
- Dean, Faculty of Engineering, Chulalongkorn University (2013 - 2016)
- Director, Energy Research Institute, Chulalongkorn University (2007 - 2013)
