= Pirom Kamolratanakul =

- ภิรมย์ กมลรัตนกุล

16th President of Chulalongkorn University
- In office 1 April 2008 – 17 May 2016
- Preceded by: Suchada Kiranandana
- Succeeded by: Bundhit Eua-arporn

Pirom Kamolratanakul (Thai: ภิรมย์ กมลรัตนกุล, RTGS: Phirom Kamonrattanakun) is a Thai doctor and academic administrator who served as the 16th president of Chulalongkorn University from 2008 to 2016. He previously served as dean of the faculty of medicine and director of King Chulalongkorn Memorial Hospital.
