= Suchada Kiranandana =

Thai academic administrator (born 1946)

- สุชาดา กีระนันทน์
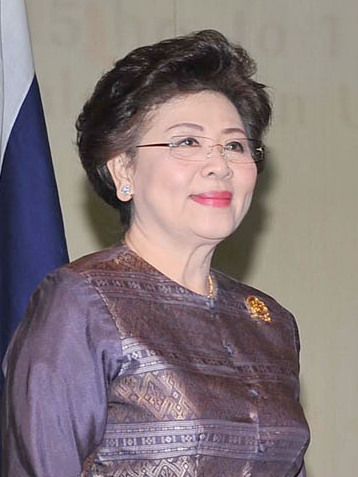
- Suchada Kiranandana in 2016

15th President of Chulalongkorn University
- In office 1 April 2004 – 31 May 2008
- Preceded by: Thatchai Sumitra
- Succeeded by: Pirom Kamolratanakul

Personal details
- Spouse: Tienchai Kiranandana
- Education: Chulalongkorn University (B.Com); Harvard University (MS, PhD)

Suchada Kiranandana (Thai: สุชาดา กีระนันทน์; RTGS: Suchada Kiranantha) is a Thai academic administrator who served as the 15th president of Chulalongkorn University from 2004 to 2008. Suchada was the first female president of Chulalongkorn University. She later served as chair of the Chulalongkorn University Council from 2012 to 2018, the first woman to chair the council.

== Career ==
Suchada served as Dean of Faculty of Commerce and Accountancy of Chulalongkorn University from 1991 to 1991. She later served as Dean of the Graduate School from 1999 to 2004. As president of Chulalongkorn University, she was credited with reducing bureaucracy.
