= Chao Ratchabut (Mokfa Na Nan) =

Thai royal

Mokfa Na Nan: หมอกฟ้า ณ น่าน
- Prince of Nan; Chao Ratchabut
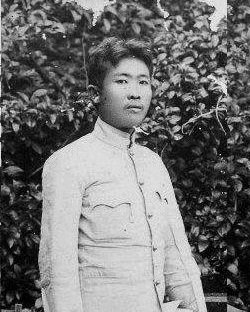
- Mokfa in 1907
- Born: 16 June 1880; Nakhon Nan, Siam
- Died: 1 March 1958 (aged 77); Nan, Thailand
- Spouse: Princess Bunsom Na Nan
- Issue: 7
- House: Tin Mahawong
- Father: Chao Mahaphrom Surathada
- Mother: Princess Srisopa

Chao Ratchabut of Nan (Thai: เจ้าราชบุตร), or Mokfa Na Nan (Thai: หมอกฟ้า ณ น่าน), was a Thai royal, a son of Mahaphrom Surathada, the last ruler of Nan, and Mae Chao Srisopa, the first consort.

== Biography ==
Mokfa was born on Wednesday, the 9th lunar month (Northern Thailand) in 1880 (B.E. 2423) at Ban Hua Khuang, Nai Wiang Subdistrict, Mueang Nan district, Nan province. He was the eighth son of Maha Phrom Suratthada, the 64th ruler of Nan, and the second son of Chao Sri Sopha, the first consort. He had seven siblings from the same mother. At the age of 15, his father had him ordain as a novice monk and disciple of Phra Bhikkhu Inthason, the abbot of Wat Hua Wiang Tai, to study Buddhist practices. He remained ordained as a novice monk at Wat Hua Wiang Tai until 1897 (B.E. 2440), after which he disrobed to assist in royal duties for his father. At the age of 25, he married Princess Bunsom Muangchai, the daughter of Chao Bunthawong and Mother Boonnam Muangchai.

Mokfa died on 1 March 1958 at the age of 77.

== Honours ==
- 1931 – Companion of the Most Illustrious Order of Chula Chom Klao
- 1937 – Commander of the Most Exalted Order of the White Elephant
- 1903 – Rachada Bhisek Medal
- 1912 – King Rama VI Coronation Medal
- 1925 – King Rama VII Coronation Medal
