= 2014 interim constitution of Thailand =

Law of Thailand

Constitution of the Kingdom of Thailand (Interim) 2557 Buddhist Era

Overview
- Original title: รัฐธรรมนูญแห่งราชอาณาจักรไทย (ฉบับชั่วคราว) พุทธศักราช ๒๕๕๗
- Jurisdiction: Thailand
- Date effective: 22 July 2014
- System: Unitary parliamentary constitutional monarchy de facto Military dictatorship

Government structure
- Branches: 3
- Head of state: Monarch
- Chambers: Unicameral (National Legislative Assembly)
- Executive: Cabinet, led by a Prime Minister; National Council for Peace and Order, led by a Leader of NCPO
- Judiciary: Supreme Court
- Federalism: Unitary
- Electoral college: No

History
- First legislature: 31 July 2014
- First executive: 24 August 2014
- First court: 1 October 2014
- Repealed: 6 April 2017
- Amendments: 4
- Last amended: 15 January 2017
- Author: Wissanu Krea-ngam et al.
- Signatories: Bhumibol Adulyadej
- Supersedes: 2007 constitution of Thailand

Full text
- Translation:Constitution of the Kingdom of Thailand (Interim) 2014/2014-07-22 at Wikisource

Wikisource
- Translation:Amendment to the Constitution of the Kingdom of Thailand (Interim) 2014 (No. 1) 2015; Translation:Amendment to the Constitution of the Kingdom of Thailand (Interim) 2014 (No. 2) 2016; Translation:Amendment to the Constitution of the Kingdom of Thailand (Interim) 2014 (No. 3) 2016; Translation:Amendment to the Constitution of the Kingdom of Thailand (Interim), 2557 Buddhist Era, (No. 4), 2560 Buddhist Era

The Constitution of the Kingdom of Thailand (Interim) 2014 (Thai: รัฐธรรมนูญแห่งราชอาณาจักรไทย (ฉบับชั่วคราว) พุทธศักราช ๒๕๕๗) was a constitution of Thailand in force between 2014 and 2017.

Drafted by law lecturers from Chulalongkorn University (CU), the constitution was enacted by the National Council for Peace and Order (NCPO), a military junta led by General Prayut Chan-o-cha which staged a coup d'état against the caretaker government on 22 May 2014. Without public consultation, King Bhumibol Adulyadej assented to and signed the constitution on 22 July 2014. The constitution came into force on that day and replaced the 2007 constitution.

The interim constitution paves the way for the establishment of a national legislature to exercise the legislative power, a provisional cabinet to take charge of public administration, a reform council to execute extensive national reforms and approve a draft new constitution, and a constituent committee to draft the new constitution. The constitution does specify fixed dates for the completion of these works.

Although the constitution recognises Thailand as a democratic state and the Thai people as sovereign, the constitution grants amnesty to those involved for all past and future military actions concerning the coup and invests the NCPO with vast powers, including the power by which the NCPO leader can issue any order at will for the sake of the reforms or security. All orders so issued are considered lawful and final.

Public discussions about the interim constitution are prohibited by the NCPO.

== History ==
List of acronyms/initialisms in this article
Acronyms	For
CC	Constituent Committee
CU	Chulalongkorn University
NCPO	National Council for Peace and Order
NLA	National Legislative Assembly
NRC	National Reform Council

After months of political crisis in which former Democrat Party secretary general Suthep Thaugsuban led a street protest against the government of Prime Minister Yingluck Shinawatra, the Royal Thai Armed Forces staged a coup d'état unseating the government on 22 May 2014. On that day, the military formed the NCPO to rule the nation and partially repealed the 2007 constitution, keeping intact chapter 2 (concerning the monarchical institution).

General Prayut said that he would run the country until the situation requires an interim government, without promises of a quick return to civilian rule. But after international pressures, he announced that there would be an interim constitution and a provisional government by September 2014.

On 23 June 2014, it was announced that Chulalongkorn University law lecturer Wissanu Krea-ngam was drafting an interim constitution for General Prayut. Wissanu was assisted by Pornpet Wichitchonlachai, a fellow law lecturer at Chulalongkorn University. Pornpet is known for his unsuccessful proposal to extend the lèse majesté law to all members of the royal household and the privy council.

On 22 July 2014, the two-month anniversary of the coup, General Prayut had an audience with King Bhumibol Adulyadej at his seaside Klai Kangwon Palace to present the draft interim constitution to the King for his signature. After being signed by the King on that day, it went into effect forthwith and was published in the Royal Gazette.

== Contents ==
The constitution consists of 48 sections.

=== General provisions ===
Sections 1 and 2 prescribe that Thailand is a unitary and democratic monarchy. Section 3 provides that "sovereign power belongs to all Thais". Section 4 recognises human dignity, rights, liberties, and equality of all Thais.

Section 5 says that all matters failing to be mentioned in the constitution will be dealt with pursuant to the customary practices of democratic government of monarchical Thailand, insofar as those practices are not contrary to the constitution.

=== Legislative branch ===
Sections 6–18 concern the legislative branch. These sections establish a unicameral legislature called the National Legislative Assembly (สภานิติบัญญัติแห่งชาติ) or NLA. The NLA consists of no more than 220 members, all handpicked by the NCPO and appointed by the king.

Section 15 grants the king the power to veto bills.

=== Executive branch ===
Sections 19–20 establish a cabinet consisting of one prime minister and no more than 35 other ministers, all appointed by the king after the prime minister is selected by the NLA and the other ministers are selected by the prime minister. Section 19 allows the prime minister to be removed by the king upon advice of the NLA president. This advice can only be made upon a proposal by the NCPO. The section also allows for a minister to be removed by the king upon the advice of the prime minister.

Sections 21–25 contain certain prerogatives of the king, such as the issuance of decrees, the conclusion of treaties, and the ceremonial appointment and removal of governmental officers.

Section 42 keeps the NCPO in existence and authorises it to control the cabinet.

==== Section 44 ====
Section 44 empowers the NCPO leader to issue any order "for the sake of the reforms in any field, the promotion of love and harmony amongst the people in the nation, or the prevention, abatement or suppression of any act detrimental to national order or security, royal throne, national economy or public administration, whether the act occurs inside or outside the kingdom". The orders so issued are all deemed "lawful, constitutional and final". Following the 2019 Thai general election, a new cabinet was sworn in on 16 July 2019. This dissolved the NCPO and rendered Section 44 void.

=== National Reform Council ===
Sections 27–31 provide for extensive national reforms in 11 governmental functions: politics, public administration, law and justice, local administration, education, economy, energy, public health and environment, media, society, and others.

Section 28 establishes a body called National Reform Council (สภาปฏิรูปแห่งชาติ) or NRC to implement the reforms. The NRC has no more than 250 members: 76 members represent the 76 provinces (one from each province), one member represents Bangkok, and the others represent the 11 functions of government. All of them are handpicked by the NCPO and appointed by the king.

The methods for selection of NRC members are outlined in section 30 of the constitution and in a royal decree issued on 31 July 2014:

- There are 11 panels recruiting candidates from the 11 functions (one panel for each function), 76 panels recruiting candidates from the 76 provinces (one panel for each province), and one panel recruiting candidates from Bangkok. The composition of each panel is as follows:
  - Each of the 11 panels consists of seven members appointed by the NCPO from among the persons considered by the NCPO to be experts in the function concerned.
  - Each of the 76 panels consists of four members: the governor of that province, one of the chief judges of the provincial courts in that province who takes precedence over the others, one of the chiefs of the provincial administrative organisations in that province who represents the sub-district community councils in the province, and the president of the provincial election commission.
  - The Bangkok panel consists of four members: the President of the Council of University Presidents of Thailand, the President of the Civil Court, one of the Clerks of Bangkok who represents the provincial community councils in Bangkok, and the President of the Bangkok Election Commission.
- There is no time limit for each panel to complete the recruitment.
- After the 11 panels complete the recruitment, they forward the candidate lists to the Election Commission secretary general who then reviews the background of each candidate. The review needs to be finished within 10 days after the entities in each field recommend appropriate persons to the concerned panel to be selected as candidates. The recommendation is required to be made within 20 days after that panel is appointed. After the review is finished, each panel nominates no more than 50 candidates to the NCPO.
- After the 76 panels and the Bangkok panel complete the recruitment, each of them nominates five candidates to the NCPO.
- The NCPO selects one of the five candidates nominated by each of the 76 panels, selects one of the five candidates nominated by the Bangkok panel, and selects any number out of the candidates nominated by the 11 panels. The total number of those selected cannot be more than 250.
- The NCPO then advises the king to formally appoint those selected as NCR members.
- Doubts and questions about the selection are to be decided by the NCPO leader. His decisions are all deemed lawful.

=== New constitution ===
Section 32–39 detail the preparation of a new constitution. Section 32 establishes a body called Constituent Committee (คณะกรรมาธิการยกร่างรัฐธรรมนูญ) or CC. The CC consists of 36 members appointed by the NRC president:

- One president nominated by the NCPO
- Twenty members nominated by the NRC
- Five members nominated by the NLA
- Five members nominated by the cabinet
- Five members nominated by the NCPO

CC members are required to be appointed within 15 days after the NRC is convoked for the first time.

The preparation of a new constitution is started when the NRC makes recommendations about the new constitution to the CC. The recommendations are required to be made within 60 days after the first meeting of the NRC. The CC is required to complete drafting the new constitution within 120 days after receiving those recommendations. If it fails to observe the time limit, it comes to an end and a new CC is then appointed within 15 days to draw up a new draft. The new CC may not include any member of the defunct CC.

The finished draft is to be forwarded to the NRC for initial consideration which needs to be completed within 10 days after the NRC receives the draft. Within 30 days of the initial consideration, any member of the NRC, NCPO, or cabinet may make proposals for editing the draft to the CC. The proposals are then considered by the CC during a period of 60 days following the said 30 days.

The edited draft is to be forwarded to the NRC to further be approved or disapproved in whole. The approval or disapproval must be adopted within 15 days after the NRC receives the draft and the draft cannot be edited again. If the draft is approved, the NRC president presents it to the king for the royal signature and the NRC president also countersigns the draft. Section 37 permits the king to veto the draft constitution.

If the NRC fails to adopt the approval or disapproval within the time limit, or if the draft is disapproved by the NRC or is vetoed by the king, both the NRC and the CC will come to an end. A new NRC and CC will then be appointed to redo the process. The new NRC and CC may not include any member of the defunct NRC or CC.

Section 35 sets out 10 requirements which must be in the new constitution, such as provisions declaring Thailand a monarchy, the establishment of a democratic government which is "appropriate for Thai society", and the prohibition of change of some principles to be contained in the new constitution.

=== Miscellaneous provisions ===
Section 26 recognises judicial independence. Section 45 allows the Constitutional Court to remain functional, but subject to the special power of the NCPO leader.

Section 40 requires the issuance of a royal decree to determine monetary benefits for the members of the NLA, NRC, NCPO, and CC.

Section 46 permits an amendment to the interim constitution. It prescribes that "if necessary and appropriate," the NCPO and the cabinet may jointly propose an amendment to the NLA and the NLA needs to approve or disapprove the proposal within 15 days of receiving the proposal. The section again authorises the king to veto the approved proposal.

Sections 47–48 legitimise all coup-related actions by the NCPO, by its subordinates, or by the subordinates of its subordinates, as well as all orders and announcements issued by them.

== Criticism ==
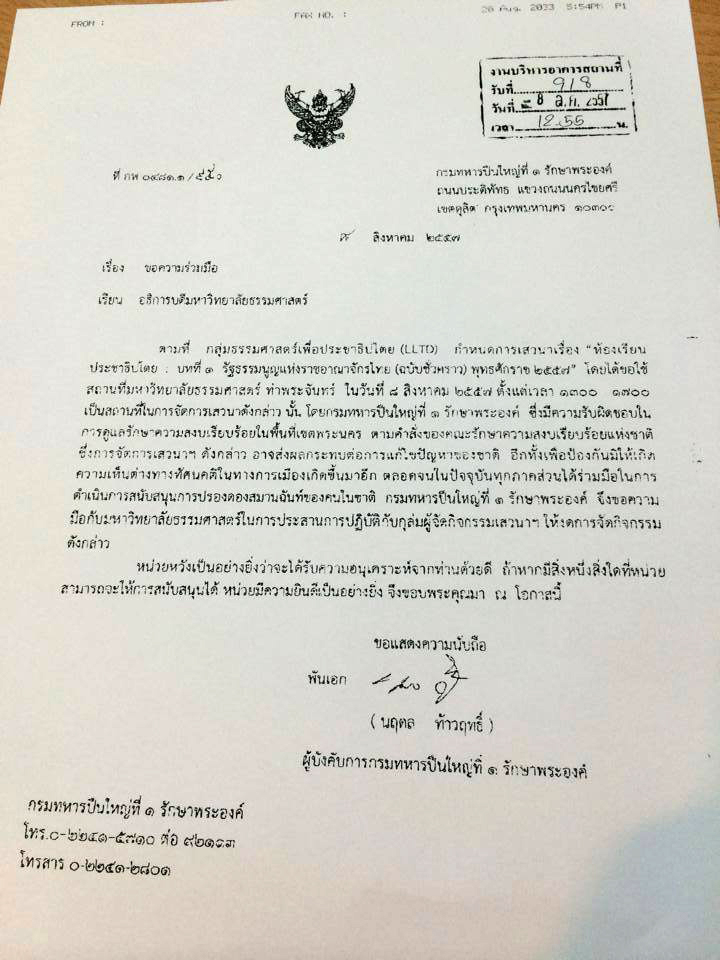
A letter from a royal guard regiment commander to the rector of Thammasat University, ordering the university to cancel a public forum on the interim constitution which was to be held by its law faculty on 8 August 2014 in Bangkok.

The national reforms dictated by the constitution reflect the demands of the anti-government protesters who wanted an unelected reform council to carry out national reforms with a view to eradicating the influence of Yingluck and Thaksin in Thai politics.

The constitution has been heavily criticised for being undemocratic and further strengthening the military's powers, especially section 44 which gives the NCPO sweeping powers and sections 47 and 48 which enshrine amnesty for all past and future military actions.

Provisions similar to section 44 had been contained in some of the previous interim supreme laws of Thailand and had been invoked by Thai military dictators to order extrajudicial killings. One of the notable cases was section 17 of the 1959 charter which had been invoked by Field Marshal Sarit Thanarat to order a large number of people accused of crimes to be executed without proper trials in court. Those alleged crimes ranged from committing arson, being communists, to proclaiming oneself a saint which was considered by Field Marshal Sarit to be a threat to the throne.

Human Rights Watch's Asian division director Brad Adams said although section 4 of the constitution recognises human rights and liberties arising from democratic traditions and international obligations of Thailand, the NCPO has broad authority under section 44 to limit, suspend or suppress fundamental human rights protections. In a statement he said, "The NCPO's claims that the interim constitution is essential for restoring electoral democracy and civilian rule in Thailand are a façade for continuing control by the junta....By tightening their control, the generals are backtracking on their repeated promises to restore democracy in Thailand. This is a charter for dictatorship."

Regarding the amnesty under sections 47 and 48, Paul Chambers, director of research at the Institute of Southeast Asian Affairs, said, "The point of the constitution is to add palace legitimacy to the coup through the king-endorsed enshrinement of new laws." He added that "Almost every Thai constitution has included an amnesty for the military. In fact, amnesty for military has been a major rationale for most Thai constitutions. This allows and encourages coup after coup after coup."

In addition, the constitution has been criticised for failing to precisely specify when the reforms and the preparation of a new constitution would be finished. Retired Thammasat University (TU) dean of law Panas Tassaneyanond said, "The only thing democracy lovers could hold on to was the NCPO leader's pledge to return power to the people." A group of Thai citizens issued a statement condemning the constitution for not representing the will of the Thais as a whole, describing it as "Thailand's most anti-democratic constitution in half a century".

On 23 July 2014, the NCPO made a televised appearance to give an explanation about the constitution. During the appearance, CU law lecturer Wissanu Krea-ngam, who drafted the interim constitution, said the power under section 44 is intended for dealing with any counter-coup. He said "I don't care if anybody says it's a retrograde step. But without that section, we would lack any power to handle some serious problems like counter coups which had happened in the history." He also said that the amnesty under sections 47 and 48 were needed to prevent "endless vengeance" and such amnesty has been a tradition since the 1932 revolution. Pornpet Wichitchonlachai, another CU law lecturer who assisted Wissanu in drafting the interim constitution, said he personally believed that General Prayut, in exercising the power under section 44, would not go as far as Field Marshal Sarit did. However, the televising was immediately stopped when Pravit Rojanaphruk, a senior journalist from The Nation, asked the NCPO to more clearly explain sections 44 and 48.

The draft interim constitution originally required that a draft new constitution be approved by the citizens in a nationwide referendum before it is forwarded to the king for his signature. The requirement was disapproved by the NCPO and was deleted. Wisanu explained that the requirement was deleted to avoid "lengthy process".

Following heavy criticism, the military ordered prohibition of public discussions on the interim constitution, saying that "love and harmony of the people in the nation" would be affected.

== Subsequent events ==
On 31 July 2014, 200 NLA members were appointed, of whom 105 were military officers, 10 were police officers, and the others academics, politicians, and businesspersons who opposed the ousted government. Pornpet and a younger brother of General Prayut are also on the list of appointees. On 7 August 2014, the state opening of the NLA was held. The following day, Pornpet was selected as the NLA president.

On 2 August 2014, the royal decree under section 40 of the constitution was issued to determine monetary benefits for the NCPO members. General Prayut was granted a total of 125,590 baht per month. Each of the other NCPO members was given 119,920 baht per month. These salaries are paid in addition to the benefits they are already entitled to by virtue of their posts in the armed forces.

On 21 August 2014, the NLA unanimously voted General Prayut the new prime minister of the country. The formal appointment was made on 24 August 2014.

In October 2014, the United Nations issued a short report citing several criticisms and notes of concern over the 2014 interim constitution.

On 29 August 2015, the CC completed drafting a new constitution and forwarded it to the NRC for approval. On 6 September 2015, the NRC voted 135:105 to disapprove the draft. According to the interim constitution, the draft being rejected resulted in the coming to an end of both the NRC and the CC. A new CC was appointed and given 180 days to draw up a new constitution. The process of writing a new constitution must now start from scratch and the earliest an election could be held would be April 2017, delaying a return to the junta's long promised "true democracy".

== See also ==
- Constitution of Thailand
- 2013–14 Thai political crisis
- 2014 Thai coup d'état
