= National Council for Peace and Order =

Military junta government of Thailand from 2014–2019

- คณะรักษาความสงบแห่งชาติ
- Formation: 22 May 2014
- Dissolved: 16 July 2019
- Type: Military junta
- Headquarters: Royal Thai Army Headquarters
- Appointer: Bhumibol Adulyadej
- Leader: Prayut Chan-o-cha
- Key people: Prawit Wongsuwan Deputy; Thanasak Patimaprakorn Deputy; Narong Pipathanasai Deputy; Prajin Juntong Deputy; Adul Saengsingkaew Deputy; Apirat Kongsompong Secretary

The National Council for Peace and Order (NCPO; Thai: คณะรักษาความสงบแห่งชาติ; RTGS: khana raksa khwam sangop haeng chat; abbreviated (Thai: คสช.; RTGS: khosocho)) was the military junta that ruled Thailand from its coup d'état on 22 May 2014 to 16 July 2019. On 20 May 2014, the military declared martial law nationwide in an attempt to stop the country's escalating political crisis, and to force the democratically elected government out of office. On 22 May, the military removed the Yingluck Shinawatra government and formed the NCPO to take control of the country. The junta censored the broadcasting system in Thailand, suspended most of the constitution (except for the article concerning the country's king), and detained members of the Thai cabinet. The NCPO was formally dissolved following the swearing-in of the new cabinet on 16 July 2019. Critics like former Thai ambassador Pithaya Pookaman charge that the NCPO "...is practically still very much intact. Its arbitrary power[s] ... transferred to the existing Internal Security Operations Command chaired by the prime minister."

== Name ==
The original English name assumed by the junta was "National Peace and Order Maintaining Council" or "NPOMC". The name was later changed to "National Council for Peace and Order" or "NCPO" on 24 May 2014.

== Membership and authority ==
On 22 May 2014, the NCPO announced its composition and stated that its leader would exercise all powers and duties which the laws invest in the prime minister and the cabinet, until a new prime minister was elected or appointed.

On 23 May, the NCPO announced that short and long-term national administrative policies would be determined by its leader. It assigned its members to government ministries and agencies.

On 24 May 2014, the NCPO dissolved the Senate and vested legislative power in its leader. It also ordered the judicial branch to operate under its directives. Later that day, it transferred Police General Adul Saengsingkaew, who was the Commissioner-General of the Royal Thai Police and also its deputy leader, to an inactive post in the Office of the Prime Minister. Adul was replaced by Police General Watcharapol Prasarnrajkit.

On 26 May, King Bhumibol Adulyadej endorsed the coup, formally appointing General Prayut Chan-o-cha to "take charge of public administration" as of 24 May.

Office	Name	Military status			In charge of
Office	Name	Branch	Rank	Position	In charge of
Leader	Prayut Chan-o-cha	Royal Thai Army	General	Commander-in-Chief	Government of Thailand (as prime minister); Internal Security Operations Command; Ministry of Justice; National Anti-Money Laundering Office; National Budget Bureau; National Intelligence Agency; National Police Agency; National Security Council; Office of the Attorney General
Deputy Leader	Thanasak Patimaprakorn	Royal Thai Armed Forces Headquarters	General	Chief of the Armed Forces	Ministry of Defence; Ministry of Foreign Affairs; Ministry of Information and Communication Technology; Ministry of Interior
Deputy Leader	Narong Pipathanasai	Royal Thai Navy	Admiral	Commander-in-Chief	Ministry of Education; Ministry of Public Health; Ministry of Social Development and Human Security
Deputy Leader	Prajin Juntong	Royal Thai Air Force	Air Chief Marshal	Commander-in-Chief	Ministry of Agriculture and Cooperatives; Ministry of Commerce; Ministry of Labour; Ministry of Finance; Ministry of Transport
Deputy Leader	Adul Sangsingkeo	Royal Thai Police Office of Prime Minister	Police General	Former Commissioner-General Minister of the Office of Prime Minister	Bureau of the Royal Household; Council of State; Cabinet Secretariat; Civil Service Commission; Consumer Protection Commission; House of Representatives Secretariat; National Office of Buddhism; National Economic and Social Development Commission; National Education Standards and Quality Assessment Office; National Research Council; Office of His Majesty's Principal Private Secretary; Office of the Prime Minister; Office of the Prime Minister's Permanent Secretariat; Prime Minister Secretariat; Public Relations Department; Public Sector Development Commission; Senate Secretariat; Royal Development Projects Board; Royal Society of Thailand; Thailand Research Fund
Secretary-General	Teerachai Nakwanich	Royal Thai Army	General	Deputy Commander-in-Chief	
Deputy Secretary-General	Chatudom Titthasiri	Royal Thai Army	General	Deputy Commander-in-Chief	
Spokesman	Winthai Suvaree	Royal Thai Army	Colonel	Vice Spokesman of the Army	

=== Board of consultants ===
On 26 May 2014, the NCPO announced the formation of its Board of Consultants:

Office	Name	Note
Chairman	Prawit Wongsuwan	Former Minister of Defence, (Abhisit Vejjajiva's cabinet)
Vice Chairman	Anupong Paochinda	Former commander-in-chief of the army
Vice Chairman	Pridiyathorn Devakula	Former Governor of the Bank of Thailand
Consultant	Somkid Jatusripitak	Former Deputy Prime Minister and Minister of Finance, (Thaksin Shinawatra's cabinet)
Consultant	Narongchai Akrasanee	Member of Thai Monetary Policy Committee and Former Minister of Trade, (Chavalit Yongchaiyudh's cabinet)
Consultant	Wissanu Krea-ngam	Former Deputy Prime Minister, (Thaksin Shinawatra's cabinet)
Consultant	Yongyuth Yuthavong	Former Minister of Science and Technology, (Surayud Chulanont's cabinet)
Consultant	Itthaporn Subhawong	Former commander-in-chief of the air force
Consultant	Noppadol Intapanya	Former secretary to Minister of Defence, (Prawit Wongsuwan)
Consultant and Secretary	Dowpong Rattanasuwan	Former vice commander-in-chief of the army

== Political motivations and objectives ==
The stated objective of the coup and NCPO was to restore order to Thailand and to enact political reforms. Specifically, Thailand's military junta promised to clean up corruption, reduce political tensions, transform the Thai economy, solve the issues in Thailand's educational system and infrastructure, and equitably allocate state funding regionally. Since then, Thailand's military has failed to demonstrate it is a neutral, prudent economic manager that refrains from mixing business and politics. Top army brass appear to be inexplicably wealthy. The generals have been accused of larding Thai companies with junta cronies, of boosting defense budgets, and of making little progress on economic reform.

=== Attitude adjustment ===
Since taking over, the NCPO has made full use of martial law to prosecute opponents, ban political activity, and censor the media. More than 1,000 people, including academics, political bloggers, activists and politicians, have been detained or sent for "attitude adjustment" at military installations. There are allegations of torture. Prosecutions under the country's strict lèse majesté laws, which protect the monarchy from insult, have risen sharply. In its annual report in January 2015, Human Rights Watch said military rule had sent human rights in Thailand into "a freefall".

The victims said that they were taken out of their house and detained in the military base. Renowned dissents such as Yingluck Shinawatra, Watana Muangsook, Pravit Rojanaphruk, and Karun Hosakul were abused by the NCPO since the coup. Deputy Prime Minister Prawit Wongsuwan told reporters that "If they speak so 100 times, they will be summoned 100 times." Prawit added that "attitude adjustment" can last between three and seven days.

== State influence on Buddhism ==
From 2015, Buddhism in Thailand came under significantly higher state control during Prayut's premiership. Following the coup, the NCPO set up a National Reform Council with a religious committee led by former Thai senator Paiboon Nititawan and former monk Mano Laohavanich. The calls for reform were led by one of Prayut's close allies, activist monk Phra Buddha Issara, known for leading the violent protests in Bangkok that led to the coup.

In 2016, the NCPO proposed requiring temples to open their finances to the public and requiring monks to carry smart cards to identify their legal and religious backgrounds. The measures were aimed at increasing transparency and efficiency in the management of temples and registration of monks, and were endorsed by the Sangha Supreme Council. The new constitution promulgated in 2017 indicates that the state shall support Buddhism and other religions as well as in disseminating the teachings of Theravada Buddhism. Prayut later stalled a decision by the Sangha Supreme Council by refusing to submit the nomination for Supreme Patriarch of Somdet Chuang, a Maha Nikaya monk who was next in line for the position. The appointment was stalled until a law passed that allowed the Thai government to bypass the Sangha Supreme Council and appoint the Supreme Patriarch directly. This led to the appointment of a monk from the Dhammayuttika Nikaya instead by King Rama X, who chose the name out of one of five given to him by Prayut.

In 2017, Prayut used article 44 to replace the head of the National Office of Buddhism with a Department of Special Investigation (DSI) official. However, in August 2017, Prayut removed him from the post after religious groups called on the government to fire him because of his reform plans, which were viewed as damaging the image of monks. Phra Buddha Issara said the junta gave in to pressure too easily given government promises to fight corruption.

In May 2018, the NCPO launched simultaneous raids of four different temples to arrest several monks shortly after a crackdown on protesters on the anniversary of the coup. To the surprise of many officials, one of the monks arrested was Phra Buddha Issara, known for his ties to Prayut. The right-wing monk was arrested for charges brought against him in 2014, including alleged robbery and detaining officials, however, his most serious charge was a charge of unauthorized use of the royal seal filed in 2017. Police did not state why he was just then being arrested for charges filed as far back as four years ago; one activist stated he believed it was because of an order from an undisclosed influential figure. Former Senator Paiboon, who led the NCPO's tightening control of Buddhism, also expressed surprise at the arrest. All of the monks arrested in the May raids were defrocked shortly after being taken into custody, and detained before trial. (Note: Thai law states that monks cannot be jailed, therefore any monk taken into custody must be defrocked if denied release on bail, even before guilt is determined.)

== Decisions and future ==
The NCPO repealed the 2007 Constitution, save the second chapter which deals with the King. In addition, it formally ordered the dissolution of the caretaker government, while the Senate was dissolved. Other state agencies, including the courts and the independent organs, remain operative.

The NCPO imposed a curfew throughout the country, ordering people to stay indoors from 22:00 to 05:00. It laid down a ban on political gatherings and directed all protesters to disperse. It also ordered all educational institutes, both public and private, to close from 23 to 25 May 2014.

== Compensation ==
On 2 August 2014, a law was issued to determine monthly salaries and other monetary benefits for NCPO staff. General Prayut was granted 125,590 baht per month. Each of the other NCPO members was granted salaries of 119,920 baht (US$3,362) per month. These salaries are in addition to the benefits they are already entitled to receive by virtue of their posts in the armed forces.

== Reactions to the coup ==
Immediately after the coup was announced, People's Democratic Reform Committee (PDRC) protesters expressed their support for the takeover. Phra Buddha Issara, a Buddhist monk and PDRC co-leader, went on stage and proclaimed the victory of the anti-Yingluck Shinawatra government protesters before requesting that protesters return to their homes. Some pro-Shinawatra government protesters dispersed at the behest of the military, while others refused to leave. The NCPO provided 70 military vehicles to send protesters from both sides home.

- Canada – Foreign Affairs Minister John Baird condemned the coup and said, "This decision violates Thailand's democratic principles and stands in stark contrast to the Army's earlier assurances that its role would be limited to securing public order. We hope and expect the Thai military will return Thailand to civilian rule as soon as possible, respect democratic processes and the rule of law, ensure freedom of expression and assembly, and guarantee due process for those who have been detained."
- EU – The European External Action Service (EEAS) called for the military to accept and respect the constitutional authority of civilian power and stressed "the importance of holding credible and inclusive elections as soon as feasible".
- France – President François Hollande condemned the coup and called for "an immediate return to the constitutional order and for a vote to be organised".
- UN – Ban Ki-moon, Secretary-General of the United Nations issued a statement expressing concern over the coup, and called for "a prompt return to constitutional, civilian, democratic rule" and movement towards cooperation between the parties.
- US – Secretary of State John Kerry condemned the coup and said that "this act will have negative implications for the US–Thai relationship, especially for our relationship with the Thai military".
- UK – Britain expressed concern over the coup, however it did not go as far as to condemn it. The British Foreign Office urged British travelers to follow travel advice, and stated that, "We are concerned at the announcement of a military coup in Thailand and are following developments closely. We urge all sides to put aside their differences, and adhere to the values of democracy and the rule of law. This is clearly in the interests of the people of Thailand." They also added, "ongoing political instability and the continued violence undermine Thailand's democratic framework."

== The NCPO in action ==
- The government seized thousands of "divisive" blue medical boxes and towels intended for distribution to the elderly on 12 April 2016. The boxes were donated by the Democrat Party. The blue boxes carried the photo of Abhisit Vejjajiva, leader of the party. The military had only the week before seized almost 9,000 red Songkran water bowls from the Democrats' rival, the Pheu Thai Party. "The NCPO adheres to principles, righteousness and fairness under the same law. People may wonder why things cannot be handed out during this time of happiness, please understand the officials," said Colonel Piyapong Klinpan, NCPO spokesman. The Democrats had assembled more than 1,200 sets of medicine boxes and towels for the elderly in Phran Kratai District of Kamphaeng Phet Province, a party stronghold. The giveaways were aimed at marking Elderly Day on 13 April.
- In December 2015, during the same week he disparaged the poor looking for handouts, the government announced a slate of "New Year's gifts" to the populace. These included tax breaks on purchases made between 25 and 31 December, toll-free expressways, and discounted appliances and other governmental largesse.
- The Article 44 was used to suspend Sukhumbhand Paribatra, the governor of Bangkok, after irregularities made by the Office of the Auditor-General (OAG).
- In September 2018, the government arrested several alleged sympathizers of a vestigial political movement advocating the abolishment of the constitutional monarchy. Police seized as evidence T-shirts bearing the group's logo of a red and white flag. Deputy Prime Minister Prawit Wongsuwan declared, "They sell shirts and flags. We've arrested three or four of them now. Whoever we can get to, we will arrest them all," he said, adding "They are traitors."
- On 10 September 2018, police shut down a forum on the topic, "Will Myanmar's Generals Ever Face Justice for International Crimes?" organized by the Foreign Correspondents Club of Thailand (FCCT) in Bangkok. The reasons given by police for the shut down: it could damage national security, affect foreign relations, and a give a third party the opportunity to create unrest. It is thought that this is the sixth time police have forced the cancellation of an FCCT program since Thailand's military seized power in 2014.

== Dissolution ==
On 6 April 2017, a new constitution drafted by the NCPO was promulgated replacing the 2014 interim constitution. The transitory provisions of the 2017 constitution state that the NCPO will come to an end when a cabinet established after the first general election under this constitution takes office, but until then the NCPO retained its sweeping powers under the 2014 constitution. These provisions also constitutionalised all the actions as well as the announcements and orders of the NCPO.

Parliamentary elections under the new 2017 Constitution were held on 24 March 2019. The NCPO was dissolved on 16 July 2019 with the swearing-in of the new cabinet.

== See also ==
- Palang Pracharath Party
- 2013–14 Thai political crisis
- 2014 Thai coup d'état
- Constitution of Thailand
- 2014 interim constitution of Thailand
- Prayut Chan-o-cha
- 2019 Thai general election
