= Wattana Wittaya Academy =

Coordinates: 13.7443°N 100.5605°E

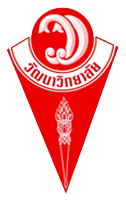

Location
- 67, soi 19, Sukhumvit Road, Khlong Toei Nuea, Watthana District, Bangkok, 10110

Information
- Type: Boarding school
- Motto: Honesty, discipline, commitment to education, citizenship, upholding religion and the monarchy
- Religious affiliation: Protestantism
- Established: 1874
- Founder: Harriet M. House (1874); Edna S. Cole (1921; refoundation)
- Age: 3 to 5 for boys and 18 for girls
- Enrollment: ~4,000
- Language: Thai; English; French; Chinese; Japanese
- Houses: Kindergarten; Primary; Secondary
- Colours: White – morality Red – academic knowledge
- Affiliations: Church of Christ in Thailand
- Website: wattana.ac.th

Wattana Wittaya Academy (W.W.A; Thai: โรงเรียนวัฒนาวิทยาลัย; RTGS: Rong Rian Watthana Witthayalai) is Thailand's first boarding school for girls. It was established in 1878 at the palace of the Third King of the Chakri Dynasty. The original name was Kullasatri Wanglang. It is located in Wattana, Bangkok.

== History ==
Wattana Wittaya Academy is under the Foundation of the Church of Christ in Thailand. It was founded in A.D. 1874 by the American Presbyterian Mission and was originally named "Kullasatri Wanglang". Located in the Royal Palace which is now within the compound of Siriraj Hospital. It was the first boarding school for girls and the first kindergarten of Thailand. Mrs. Harriet M. House was the first principal. The primary objectives of the school were to educate Thai young ladies in the fundamentals of reading, writing, Bible study and sewing.
In A.D. 1921, Miss Edna S. Cole moved the school campus to its present location and changed the name to "Wattana Wittaya Academy".

== Type of school and location ==
Wattana Wittaya Academy is a girls’ school under the supervision of the Committee of Private Sector. It is a day school from Kindergarten through grade 6 and boarding school from grade 7 through grade 12. The school is located on Sukumvit 19, in the heart of Bangkok. The beautiful 100 rai campus, of which 51 rai are education facilities, is surrounded by hospitals, hotels, banks and government offices. The school has a large open-air loudspeaker system that it uses to communicate to the students from 7 am until 9 pm.

=== English Intensive Course ===
At present, W.W.A. provides an English Intensive Course for students in the elementary and secondary levels. This program serves students whose focus is on expanding their talent and strength in English through an advanced curriculum and learning environment.

=== Kindergarten level ===
W.W.A. opened its first kindergarten in Thailand in B.E. 2450 (A.D.1907). Khunying Aroon Methathibodi was the first kindergarten teacher.
The present kindergarten offers instruction in the three grade levels, K1-K3.

- Day students.
- Boys and girls 3–5 years of age.

=== Elementary level ===
- Day students, girls only.
- Enrollment is from grade 1–6

=== Secondary level ===
The girls boarding school for the secondary level has become the trademark of this school since its origin as Wanglang School. The boarding section offers a rigorous academic environment and moral discipline to prepare the girls for their future life educationally, professionally and socially.
Various programs are offered to expand students’ knowledge and experiences including exchange programs with Canada and Japan.
Enrollment is from grade 7–12.
Admission to all 3 levels is based on the school's entrance test results.

== Campus facilities ==
- Auditoriums
- Air-conditioned dorms
- Audiovisual Equipment
- Carpark facilities
- Computer rooms
- Co-operative Store
- Counseling rooms
- Dining Hall
- Libraries
- Nursing rooms
- Religion rooms
- Swimming Pool
- Teacher offices equipped with computers and wireless access.

== Notable alumni ==
- Punnara Phoomchareon, Thai beauty pageant titleholder
- Bua Kitiyakara, Thai actress, the wife of Nakkhatra Mangala, Prince of Chanthaburi II and the mother of Queen Sirikit
- Rasri Balenciaga Chirathiwat, Thai actress and model
- Minnie (real name: Nicha Yontararak), Thai singer, songwriter, record producer, and actress, who is a member of girl group (G)I-dle
- Chayanit Chansangavej, Thai-Chinese actress
- Puangroi Apaiwong, Thai composer
