= Soamsawali =

Member of the Thai royal family (born 1957)

- Princess Suddhanarinatha
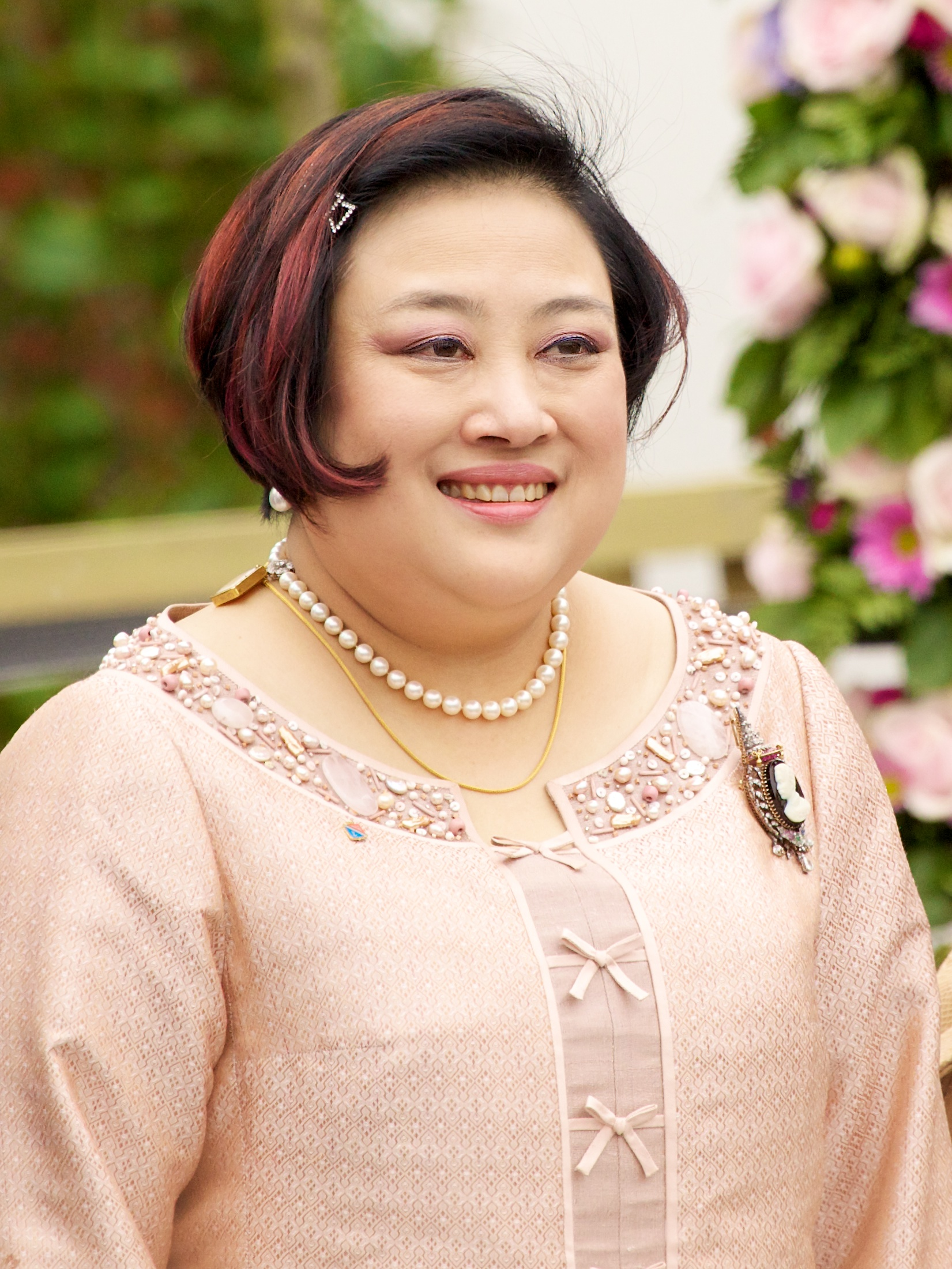
- Princess Soamsawali in Norway, 2010
- Born: Soamsawali Kitiyakara; 13 July 1957 (age 69); London, United Kingdom
- Spouse: Vajiralongkorn (Rama X) (m. 1977; div. 1991)
- Issue: Bajrakitiyabha, Princess Rajasarini Siribajra
- House: Kitiyakara (by birth); Mahidol (by marriage)
- Dynasty: Chakri
- Father: Adulakit Kitiyakara
- Mother: Bandhusawali Kitiyakara
- Religion: Theravada Buddhism
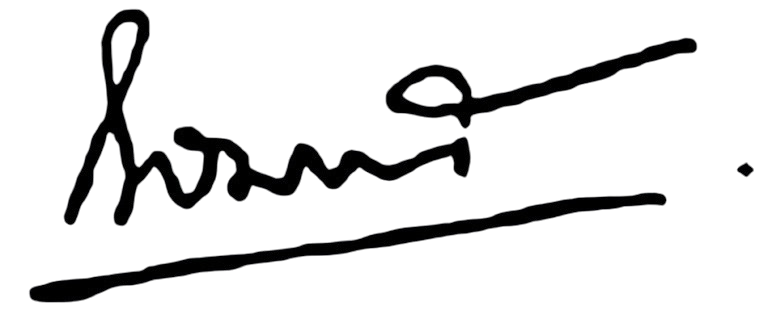
- Signature

Princess Soamsawali, the Princess Suddhanarinatha (Note: Thai: โสมสวลี, RTGS: Somsawali, pronounced [sǒːm.sā.wā.līː]), born as Mom Luang Soamsawali Kitiyakara (Note: Thai: โสมสวลี กิติยากร; RTGS: Somsawali Kitiyakon) (born 13 July 1957), is a member of the Thai royal family, and is the former wife of her first cousin King Vajiralongkorn. She was titled "the Princess Mother of the King's First Grandchild" after her divorce from the then crown prince in 1991. She is also a niece of Queen Sirikit.

== Biography ==
Princess Soamsawali was born on 13 July 1957 at Guy's Hospital in Southwark, London, United Kingdom, as the eldest child of Mom Rajawongse Adulyakit Kitiyakara (1930–2004), an elder brother of Queen Sirikit, and Princess Bandhu Savali Yugala (1933–2025). She has one younger sister, Mom Luang Sarali Kitiyakara (later known as Nathapha Kitiyakara; born 8 April 1966).

Her father was the second child of Prince Nakkhatra Mangkala Kitiyakara, 2nd Prince of Chanthaburi and Mom Luang Bua Snidvongs. Her mother was the daughter of Prince Bhanubandhu Yugala and Mom Luang Soiraya Snidvongs.

She first attended the primary level at Chitralada School, then moved to Chiang Mai with her father when he was a judge at the Chiang Mai Court. She moved to study at Regina Coeli College, the all-girls academy in Chiang Mai in 1967.

== Personal life ==
Royal wedding of Crown Prince Maha Vajiralongkorn and Soamsawali Kitiyakara in 1977

On 3 January 1977, at the age of 19, she married her first cousin, Maha Vajiralongkorn, the only son of King Bhumibol Adulyadej. After their marriage, her official title became Her Royal Highness Princess Soamsawali, Royal Consort of His Royal Highness Crown Prince Maha Vajiralongkorn of Thailand (Thai: พระเจ้าวรวงศ์เธอ พระองค์เจ้าโสมสวลี พระวรชายาในสมเด็จพระบรมโอรสาธิราชฯ สยามมกุฎราชกุมาร; RTGS: Phra Chao Worawong Thoe Phra Ong Chao Soamsawali nai Somdet Phra Orasadhiraj Sayam Makutrajakuman). The couple had one daughter, Princess Bajrakitiyabha of Thailand (1978–2026). The marriage ended in divorce in 1991.

After her divorce from the crown prince, the king, by royal proclamation, gave her a new title on 12 August 1991. Her official full title became Phra Worarachathinatdamat (Thai: พระวรราชาทินัดดามาตุ), meaning the mother of the king's first grandchild (translated into English as The Princess Mother of the King's First Grandchild). She thus retained her title as princess and remains a member of the Thai royal family. In 2019, she was granted a new title and the higher rank of "Krom Ma Meun" by King Vajiralongkorn.

Princess Soamsawali has an adopted daughter, Siraphatchara Sophatcharamani or Bai Phlu.

On 27 August 2018, Princess Soamsawali was admitted to the Chulalongkorn Hospital for treatment of a swollen shin of the right leg, which was diagnosed as a tissue infection. Her condition improved after being receiving medication until she experienced weakness in her right hand. In 2019, she suffered a brain hemorrhage and was admitted to Chulalongkorn Hospital for medical treatment.

She resides at Thewet Palace (Wang Thewet).

== Stage plays ==
In her youth, she participated in her first television drama on Channel 4, in the role of Naang Phimphilaai in the drama Bang Khun Phrom Khun Chang Khun Phaen. She also appeared as a child actor in the film Nam Phueng Khom in 1974, and was part of the cast for the stage play Chalerm Phra Kiat Somdet Phra Chao Sirikit Phra Borom Ratchini Nat during the celebration of the centenary of Her Majesty Queen Sirikit's birth. Additionally, she performed in two stage plays: Raksa Pha and after her marriage was dissolved with the former royal consort, she performed in the stage drama Koh Sawan together with Bajrakitiyabha, and Mom Luang Sarali Kitiyakara, Phra Khun Sitthikanya Kitiyakorn.

In 2014, she engaged in a stage play Su Si Thai How The Musical, assuming the character of Nang Niu Huu, who serves as the mother of Su Si Thai. This involvement aimed to generate income for contributions to the Foundation for the Welfare of the Destitute (FWD). In that same year, she also graced the television screen, taking on a role in the Channel 7 series Rak Rae, portraying Pramotjit. Continuing her artistic pursuits, in 2016, she participated in the stage play Man Prapeni Prakasit Ayasawakhun, portraying the role of the goddess Sawankhaboriharn.

== Titles, styles and honours ==
Styles of Princess Soamsawali of Thailand
- Reference style: Her Royal Highness
- Spoken style: Your Royal Highness

Royal cypher Flags of Princess Soamsawali

=== Titles and styles ===
- 13 July 1957 – 3 January 1977 : The Honourable Soamsawali Kitiyakara
  - (Thai: หม่อมหลวงโสมสวลี กิติยากร; Mom Luang Soamsawali Kitiyakara)
- 3 January 1977 : The Honourable Soamsawali Mahidol
  - (Thai: หม่อมหลวงโสมสวลี มหิดล; Mom Luang Soamsawali Mahidol)
- 3 January 1977 – 12 August 1991 : Her Royal Highness Princess Soamsawali, the Royal Consort to the Crown Prince
  - (Thai: พระเจ้าวรวงศ์เธอ พระองค์เจ้าโสมสวลี พระวรชายาในสมเด็จพระบรมโอรสาธิราชฯ สยามมกุฎราชกุมาร; Pra Chao Worawong Thoe Pra Ong Chao Soamsawali Phra Vorachaya nai Somdech Phra Baromma Orashadhiraj Sayammakut Rajakuman)
- 12 August 1991 – 5 May 2019 Her Royal Highness Princess Soamsawali
  - (Thai: พระเจ้าวรวงศ์เธอ พระองค์เจ้าโสมสวลี พระวรราชาทินัดดามาตุ; Phra Chao Worawong Thoe Phra Ong Chao Soamsawali Phra Worarachathinatdamat)
- 5 May 2019 – present : Her Royal Highness Princess Soamsawali, the Princess Suddhanarinatha
  - (Thai: พระเจ้าวรวงศ์เธอ พระองค์เจ้าโสมสวลี กรมหมื่นสุทธนารีนาถ; Phra Chao Worawong Thoe Phra Ong Chao Soamsawali Kromma Muen Suddhanarinatha)

== Accomplishments ==
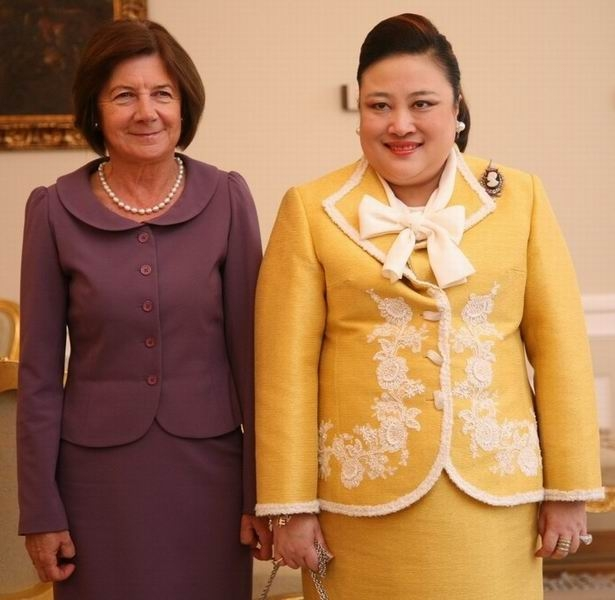
Princess Soamsawali with Poland's first lady Maria Kaczyńska in 2007

Since her divorce, Princess Soamsawali has performed many functions on behalf of the royal household. She has shown keen interest in public health and social welfare. The following Thai Red Cross Society programs are under her patronage:

- The "Reducing AIDS Infection from Mother to New-Born Baby" Programme.
- Medical Funding for AIDS patients.
- Funding for Reducing AIDS infection from Mother to the New-Born Baby.
- Milk funds for infants under the "Reduce AIDS effects from Mother to the New-Born Baby" Program.
- The Foundation of Professor Dr. Mom Rajawongse Galyanakit Kitiyakara.
- The Program of Life Giving to the Parents of AIDS-infected Babies.
- Funds for Cancer Treatment in Children
- The Princess Pa Foundation

== Honours ==
=== Thai honours ===
- Dame of the Most Illustrious Order of the Royal House of Chakri (1977)
- Dame of the Ancient and Auspicious Order of the Nine Gems (2019)
- Dame Grand Cross of the Most Illustrious Order of Chula Chom Klao
- Dame Grand Cordon of the Most Exalted Order of the White Elephant (1991)
- Dame Grand Cordon of the Most Noble Order of the Crown of Thailand
- Dame Grand Cross of the Most Admirable Order of the Direkgunabhorn
- The Order of Symbolic Propitiousness Ramkeerati - Boy Scout Citation Medal
- King Rama IX Royal Cypher Medal, First Class
- King Rama X Royal Cypher Medal, First Class

=== Foreign honours ===
- West Germany: Grand Cross 1st Class of the Order of Merit of the Federal Republic of Germany (29 February 1984).
- Nepal: Member of the Most Glorious Order of the Benevolent Ruler (12 December 1984).
- Spain: Dame Grand Cross of the Royal Order of Isabella the Catholic (13 November 1987).
- Japan: Member First Class of the Order of the Sacred Treasure (26 September 1991).
- Netherlands: Dame Grand Cross of the Order of Orange-Nassau (19 January 2004).

== Notes ==
Soamsawali, the Princess Suddhanarinatha House of Kitiyakara Cadet branch of the House of Chakri Born: 17 July 1957
Thai royalty
New creation	Royal Consort of the Crown Prince of Thailand; 1977–1991	Vacant Title next held by Srirasmi Suwadee
Order of precedence
Preceded by Princess Ubolratana	Thai order of precedence 6th position	Succeeded by Princess Sirivannavari
Non-profit organization positions
First	President of Friends in Need (of "PA") Volunteers Foundation; 2000–present	Incumbent
