= Chakri dynasty =

Reigning dynasty of Thailand

Chakri dynasty ราชวงศ์จักรี
- Royal house
- Royal emblem
- Country: Thailand (formerly Siam)
- Etymology: Chakri (title of the Siamese samuhanayok)
- Founded: 6 April 1782; 244 years ago
- Founder: Phutthayotfa Chulalok (Rama I)
- Current head: Vajiralongkorn (Rama X)
- Titles: King of Ayutthaya (Note: Thai monarchs continued to refer to themselves as Kings of Ayutthaya long after the city's fall, until the reign of Mongkut, who adopted the title King of Siam in official treaties.); King of Siam (1855–1939); King of Thailand (1939–present)
- Cadet branches: 131 cadet houses (91 royal and 40 viceregal)

The Chakri dynasty, (Note: Thai: ราชวงศ์จักรี, RTGS: Ratchawong Chakkri, pronounced [râːt.tɕʰá.wōŋ tɕàk.krīː]) unofficially the House of Chakri, is the current reigning dynasty of the Kingdom of Thailand. The head of the house is the king, who is head of state. The family has ruled Thailand since the founding of the Rattanakosin era and the city of Bangkok in 1782; following the end of Taksin's reign, when the capital of Siam shifted to Bangkok. The dynasty was founded by Rama I, a former military leader of the Thonburi Kingdom who came from the old Ayutthaya elite.

Prior to his accession to the throne, Rama I held for years the title Chakri, the civil chancellor. In founding the dynasty, the king himself chose "Chakri" as the name for it. The emblem of the house is composed of the discus (Chakra) and the trident (Trishula), the celestial weapons of the gods Vishnu and Shiva, of whom the Thai sovereign is seen as an incarnation.

In terms of lineage, King Rama IV stated in his royal correspondence that the ancestry of the Chakri dynasty was not purely Thai but of mixed Mon and Chinese descent. According to historian Edward van Roy, Kosa Pan was the son of Phraya Kiat, a Mon noble who supported Naresuan during the fourth Burmese–Siamese War, and Chao Mae Wat Dusit, said to be a daughter of King Ekathotsarot and the wet nurse of Phetracha and Prince Narai, both future kings of Siam. Through his son Khunthong, Kosa Pan was a great-great-grandfather of King Rama I, the founder of the Chakri dynasty. His elder brother, Lek, held the post of foreign minister before him. Somdet Phra Pathom Boromma Mahachanok (Thongdee), meanwhile, was the father of King Phutthayotfa Chulalok. Some theories further propose that the dynasty may descend from King Naresuan the Great of Ayutthaya, which if correct would link it by blood to the Phra Ruang dynasty of the Sukhothai.

The current head of the house is Vajiralongkorn who was proclaimed king on 1 December 2016, but has reigned with retroactive effect since 13 October 2016 after the death of his father Bhumibol Adulyadej. The house's current seat is the Grand Palace. On Saturday, 4 May 2019, the coronation of Vajiralongkorn, with the traditional ceremony, occurred in Bangkok.

== Royal family ==
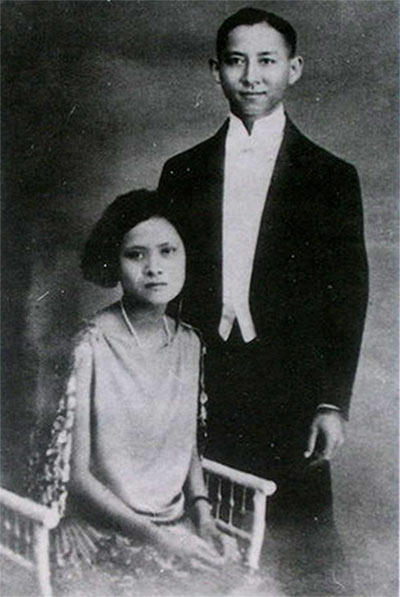
Mahidol Adulyadej, the Prince of Songkla, and Mom Sangwan (later the Princess Mother)

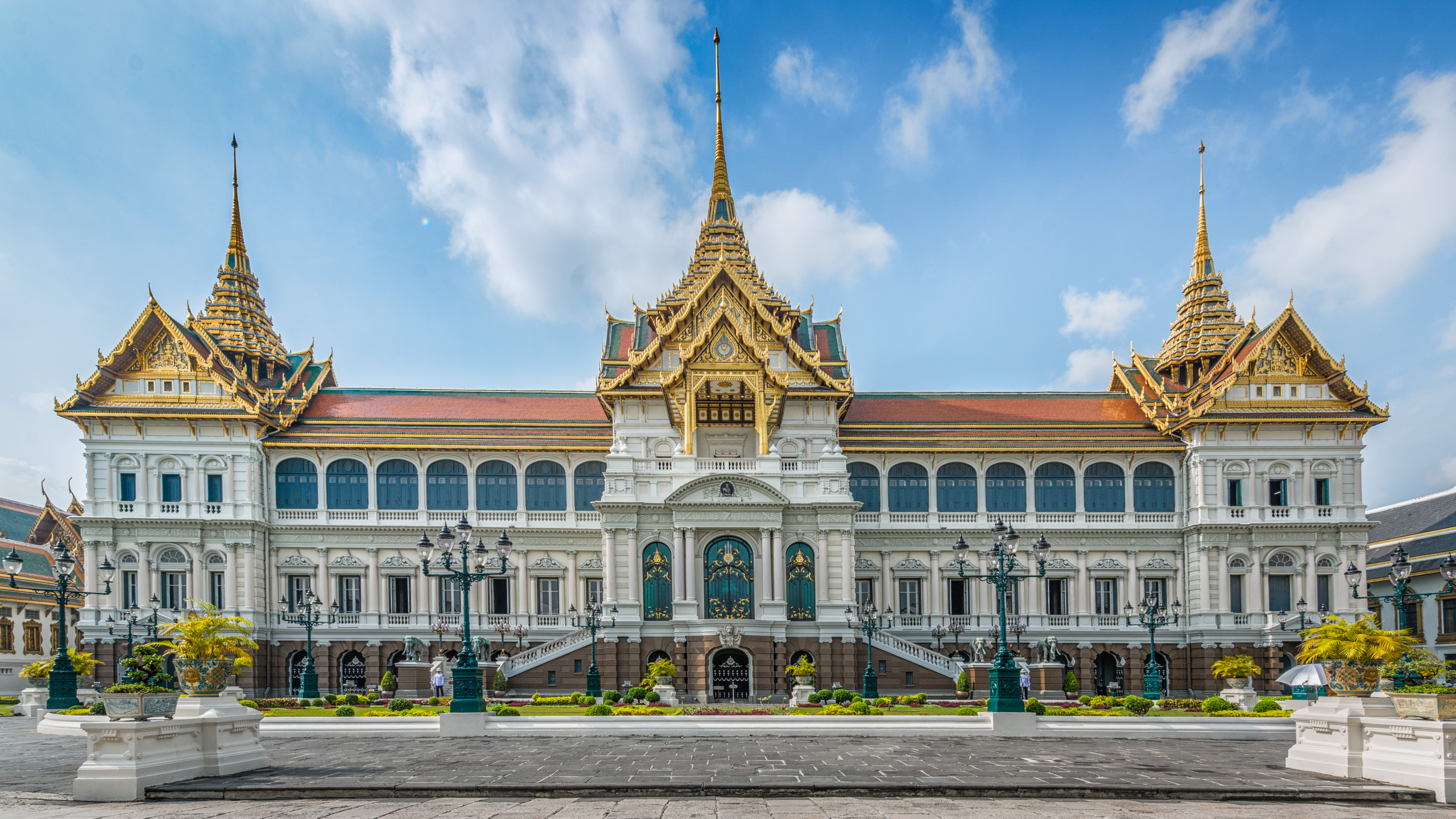
The Chakri Mahaprasat, inside the Grand Palace in Bangkok, the dynastic seat and official residence of the dynasty

The present royal family of Thailand belongs to the House of Mahidol (Thai: ราชสกุลมหิดล; RTGS: Ratchasakun Mahidon), a cadet branch of the Chakri dynasty. The House was founded by Prince Mahidol Adulyadej (1891–1929) and Princess Srinagarindra (1900–1995). The Prince was a son of King Chulalongkorn and his wife Queen Savang Vadhana. The Prince was also the half-brother of both King Vajiravudh and King Prajadhipok. After the death of King Ananda Mahidol (Prince Mahidol's elder son), King Bhumibol Adulyadej (the Prince's younger son) ascended the throne in 1946. In 1949 the King married his first cousin once removed, Mom Rajawongse Sirikit Kitiyakara (a daughter of Mom Chao Nakkhatra Mangala Kitiyakara, a grandson of King Chulalongkorn). Bhumibol was succeeded by his son Vajiralongkorn officially on 13 October 2016, but was proclaimed King on 1 December 2016.

=== Members ===
This is a list of current members of the royal family:

- The King and Queen (the monarch and his wife)
  - Princess Sirivannavari (the King's daughter)
  - Prince Dipangkorn Rasmijoti (the King's son and heir presumptive)
- Princess Ubol Ratana (the King's sister)
- The Princess Royal (the King's sister)
- The Princess Srisavangavadhana (the King's sister)
  - Princess Siribha Chudhabhorn (the King's niece)
  - Princess Aditayadorn Kitikhun (the King's niece)
- The Princess Suddhanarinatha (the King's ex-wife and maternal first cousin)

=== Other members ===
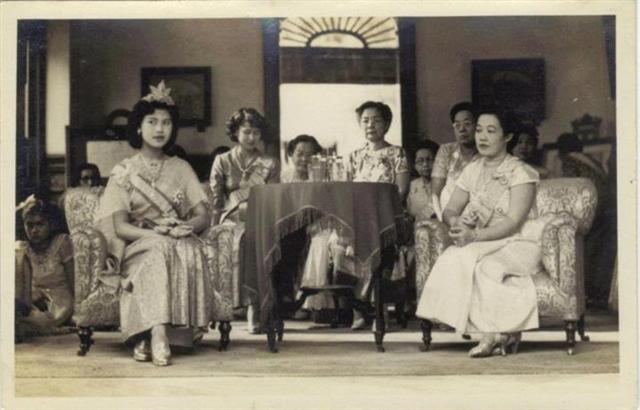
Thai royals inner court in 1950, Queen Sirikit (Far left), Princess Galyani Vadhana (center), Princess Hemvadi, Princess Adisaya Suriyabha, Princess Adorn Dibyanibha and Queen Rambhai Barni (right)

Descendants of Rama V

- Prince Chalermsuk Yugala (the King's paternal half-second cousin)
- Prince and Princess Nawaphansa Yugala (the King's paternal half-second cousin and his wife)
- Princess Srisavangvongse Yugala and Sakda Bunjitradulya (the King's paternal half-second cousin and her husband)
- Prince and Princess Dighambara Yugala (the King's paternal half-second cousin and his wife)
- Prince and Princess Chatrichalerm Yugala (the King's paternal half-second cousin and his wife)
- Princess Nobhadol Chalermsri Yugala (the King's paternal half-second cousin)

Descendants of Rama IV

- Princess Udayakanya Bhanubandhu (the King's paternal second cousin once removed)
- Prince and Princess Charuridhidej Jayankura (the King's paternal half-first cousin twice removed and his wife)

=== Other noble relatives ===
- Chaokhun Phra Sineenatha Bilasakalyani (the King's concubine)
- Sujarinee Vivacharawongse (the King's ex-wife and Princess Sirivannavari's mother)
  - Juthavachara Vivacharawongse and Riya Gough (the King's eldest son and daughter-in-law)
  - Vacharaesorn Vivacharawongse (the King's second son)
  - Chakriwat Vivacharawongse (the King's third son)
  - Vatchrawee Vivacharawongse (the King's fourth son)
- Dame Srirasmi Suwadee (the King's ex-wife and Prince Dipangkorn's mother)

Descendants of Rama IX

- Peter Ladd Jensen (Princess Ubol Ratana's ex-husband)
  - Dame Ploypailin Jensen and David Wheeler (the King's niece and nephew-in-law)
    - Maximus Wheeler (the King's great-nephew)
    - Leonardo Wheeler (the King's great-nephew)
    - Alexandra Wheeler (the King's great-niece)
  - Dame Sirikitiya Jensen (the King's niece)
- Virayudh Tishyasarin (the Princess Srisavangavadhana's ex-husband)

Descendants of Mahidol Adulyadej

- Dame Dhasanawalaya and Sinthu Sornsongkram (the King's paternal first cousin and her husband)
  - Jitat and Jessica Sornsongkram (the King's paternal first cousin once removed and his wife)
    - Jerrica Sornsongkram (the King's paternal first cousin twice removed)
    - Jaylanie Sornsongkram (the King's paternal first cousin twice removed)
    - Jaylina Sornsongkram (the King's paternal first cousin twice removed)

Descendants of Rama V

- The 2nd Prince of Chanthaburi's family:
  - The Hon. Sirina and Piya Jittalan (the King's maternal first cousin and her husband)
  - The Hon. Nathapha Kitiyakara and Wuthisak Ratanasuwan (the King's maternal first cousin and her husband; also the Princess Suddhanarinatha's sister and brother-in-law)
  - Dame Busba and Captain Surayudh Sathanapong (the King's maternal aunt and uncle)
    - Dame Suthawan and Surakiart Sathirathai (the King's maternal first cousin and her husband)
- Dame Vudhichalerm Vudhijaya (the King's paternal half-first cousin once removed)
- Bhanuma and Meth Phiphitphokha (the King's paternal half-second cousin and her husband)
- Phumariphirom and Jean-Marie Schell (the King's paternal half-second cousin and her husband)
- Padmonrangsi Senanarong (the King's paternal half-second cousin)

Descendants of Rama IV

- Bandhuvarobas Svetarundra (the King's paternal second cousin once removed)

== Line of succession ==
- King Mongkut (1804–1868)
  - King Chulalongkorn (1853–1910)
    - King Vajiravudh (1881–1925)
    - King Prajadhipok (1893–1941)
    - Mahidol Adulyadej, Prince Father (1892–1929)
      - King Ananda Mahidol (1925–1946)
      - King Bhumibol Adulyadej (1927–2016)
        - King Vajiralongkorn (born 1952)
          - (1) Prince Dipangkorn Rasmijoti (born 2005)^{P C}
          - (–) Juthavachara Vivacharawongse (born 1979)^{X M P C}
          - (–) Vacharaesorn Vivacharawongse (born 1981)^{X P C}
          - (–) Chakriwat Vivacharawongse (born 1983)^{X P C}
          - (–) Vatchrawee Vivacharawongse (born 1985)^{X P C}
          - Bajrakitiyabha, Princess Rajasarini Siribajra (1978–2026)^{C}
          - (2) Princess Sirivannavari (born 1987)^{C}
        - (–) Princess Ubol Ratana (born 1951)^{X C}
        - (3) Sirindhorn, Princess Royal (born 1955)^{C}
        - (4) Chulabhorn, Princess Srisavangavadhana (born 1957)^{C}
          - (5) Princess Siribha Chudabhorn (born 1982)^{C}
          - (6) Princess Aditayadorn Kitikhun (born 1984)^{C}
    - Yugala Dighambara, Prince of Lopburi (1882–1932)
      - Prince Bhanubandhu Yugala (1910–1995)
        - (7) Prince Nawaphansa Yugala (born 1978)^{P C}
      - Prince Chalermbol Dighambara (1913–1991)
        - (8) Prince Chalermsuk Yugala (born 1950)^{P C}
        - (9) Prince Dighambara Yugala (born 1951)^{P C}
      - Prince Anusorn Mongkolkarn (1915–1998)
        - (10) Prince Chatrichalerm Yugala (born 1942)^{P C}
  - Chaiyanuchit, Prince Bongsadisramahip (1861–1936)
    - (11) Prince Charuridhidej Jayankura (born 1933)^{P C}

Notes and sources
Mark	Source for listing or note on exclusion from succession
P	1924 Palace Law of Succession
C	1. In the case where the Throne becomes vacant and the King has already appointed an Heir to the Throne under the 1924 Palace Law on Succession, and may be submitted the name of a Princess in "Constitution of the Kingdom of Thailand 2017" Chapter II: The King, Section 21.; 2.The proposal of the name of a Princess to the throne, there has been an amendment to the constitution since 1974. Therefore, the lineage of the King Bhumibol Adulyadej is counted in accordance with the constitution amended in his reign.
M	Disqualified - married a foreigner
X	Was degraded from succession

=== Notes ===
- Princess Ubol Ratana (born 1951), eldest daughter of King Rama IX, renounced her right of succession for herself and her heirs upon her marriage in 1972.
- Juthavachara Vivacharawongse (born 1979), Vacharaesorn Vivacharawongse (born 1981), Chakriwat Vivacharawongse (born 1983), and Vatchrawee Vivacharawongse (born 1985), the sons of King Rama X and Sujarinee Vivacharawongse, are not in the line of succession to the throne.

== History ==
=== Monarchs ===
Portrait	Reign or Posthumous name / Personal name	Birth	Reign	Coronation	Consorts	Death	Claim
Rama I	His Majesty King Phutthayotfa Chulalok (Rama I) Thongduang	20 March 1737; Ayutthaya	6 April 1782 – 7 September 1809 (27 years, 154 days)	10 June 1782	Queen Amarindra and 31 other consorts	7 September 1809; Phaisan Thaksin Hall, Grand Palace (aged 72 years, 171 days)	Made himself king
Rama II	His Majesty King Phutthaloetla Naphalai (Rama II) Chim	24 February 1767; Amphawa	7 September 1809 – 21 July 1824 (14 years, 318 days)	17 September 1809	Queen Sri Suriyendra; Princess Consort Kunthon Thipphayawadi and 51 other consorts	21 July 1824; Phaisan Thaksin Hall, Grand Palace (aged 57 years, 148 days)	Son of Rama I and Amarindra
Rama III	His Majesty King Nangklao (Rama III) Thap	31 March 1788; Thonburi Palace	21 July 1824 – 2 April 1851 (26 years, 255 days)	1 August 1824	42 consorts	2 April 1851; Phaisan Thaksin Hall, Grand Palace (aged 63 years, 2 days)	Son of Rama II and Sri Sulalai
Rama IV	His Majesty King Chomklao (Rama IV) Mongkut	18 October 1804; Thonburi Palace	2 April 1851 – 1 October 1868 (17 years, 182 days)	15 May 1851	Queen Somanass Waddhanawathy; Queen Debsirindra; Princess Phannarai and 58 other consorts	1 October 1868; Phanumas Chamrun Hall, Grand Palace (aged 63 years, 349 days)	Son of Rama II and Sri Suriyendra
Rama V	His Majesty King Chulachomklao (Rama V) Chulalongkorn	20 September 1853; Grand Palace	1 October 1868 – 23 October 1910 (42 years, 22 days)	11 November 1868	Queen Sunanda Kumariratana; Queen Sukhumala Marasri; Queen Savang Vadhana; Queen Saovabha Phongsri and 88 other consorts	23 October 1910; Amphorn Sathan Residential Hall, Dusit Palace (aged 57 years, 33 days)	Son of Rama IV and Debsirindra
Rama VI	His Majesty King Mongkutklao (Rama VI) Vajiravudh	1 January 1881; Grand Palace	23 October 1910 – 26 November 1925 (15 years, 34 days)	11 November 1910	Princess Consort Indrasakdi Sachi; Consort Sucharit Suda; Princess Consort Lakshamilavan; Princess Consort Suvadhana	26 November 1925; Chakraphat Phiman Hall, Grand Palace (aged 44 years, 329 days)	Son of Rama V and Saovabha Phongsri
Rama VII	His Majesty King Pokklao (Rama VII) Prajadhipok	8 November 1893; Sutdhasri Aphirom Hall, Grand Palace	26 November 1925 – 2 March 1935 (9 years, 96 days)	25 February 1926	Queen Rambai Barni	30 May 1941; Knowle House, Surrey (aged 47 years, 203 days)	Son of Rama V and Saovabha Phongsri
Rama VIII	His Majesty King Ananda Mahidol (Rama VIII)	20 September 1925; Heidelberg	2 March 1935 – 9 June 1946 (11 years, 99 days)	never crowned	never married	9 June 1946; Boromphiman Hall, Grand Palace (aged 20 years, 262 days)	Grandson of Rama V and Savang Vadhana
Rama IX	His Majesty King Bhumibol Adulyadej (Rama IX)	5 December 1927; Mount Auburn Hospital	9 June 1946 – 13 October 2016 (70 years, 126 days)	5 May 1950	Queen Sirikit	13 October 2016; Siriraj Hospital (aged 88 years, 313 days)	Grandson of Rama V and Savang Vadhana
Rama X	His Majesty King Wachiraklao (Rama X) Vajiralongkorn	28 July 1952; Amphorn Sathan Residential Hall, Dusit Palace	13 October 2016 – present (10 years, 26 days)	4 May 2019	Queen Suthida; Consort Sineenat	Living (age 74 years, 103 days)	Son of Rama IX and Sirikit

=== Front Palaces ===
The Maha Uparat (มหาอุปราช) or the Krom Phrarajawang Boworn Sathan Mongkol (Vice or Second King of Siam/Viceroy of Siam) (กรมพระราชวังบวรสถานมงคล) was an office that was bestowed on the highest ranking prince, frequently the monarch's younger brother or son. Until 1885 every Chakri monarch had appointed a prince to this office. The Uprarat and his miniature court would reside at the Front Palace (วังหน้า) (a palace complex to the north of the Grand Palace, now the site of the Bangkok National Museum). By tradition the Uparat was designated the heir to the throne, however only Prince Itsarasunthon was able to ascend the throne as King Phutthaloetla Naphalai. The office was extremely prestigious and carried with it almost equal status to the king, this can be seen in Prince Chutamani (younger brother of King Mongkut), who was elevated to Vice King Pinklao in 1851 (he carried with him the styles and titles of a King). The office was abolished by King Chulalongkorn when his Uparat and cousin Prince Wichaichan died. He then declared his oldest son the crown prince of Siam, but not Uparat.

Portrait	Name	Birth	Relationship to Monarch	Reign	Coronation	Death	Monarch
Maha Sura Singhanat	His Royal Highness Prince; Maha Sura Singhanat	1 November 1744; Ayutthaya	Younger brother	1782 – 3 November 1803	1782	3 November 1803; Burapha Phimuk Hall, Front Palace (aged 59 years, 2 days)	Rama I
Rama II	His Royal Highness Prince Krommaluang Itsarasunthon	24 February 1767; Amphawa	Second son	15 March 1807 – 7 September 1809 (acceded to throne as Rama II) (2 years, 176 days)	15 March 1807	21 July 1824; Phaisan Thaksin Hall, Grand Palace (aged 57 years, 148 days)	Rama I
House of Chakri	His Majesty Royal Highness Prince; Maha Senanurak	29 March 1773; Thonburi	Younger brother	22 September 1809 – 16 July 1817 (7 years, 297 days)	22 September 1809	16 July 1817; Wayusathan Amaret Hall, Front Palace (aged 44 years, 109 days)	Rama II
Sakdiphonlasep	His Majesty Royal Prince; Sakdiphonlasep	21 October 1785; Grand Palace	Uncle	1824 – 1 May 1832	13 September 1824	1 May 1832; Front Palace (aged 46 years, 193 days)	Rama III
Pinklao	His Majesty King; Pinklao	4 September 1808; Thonburi Palace	Younger brother	2 April 1851 – 7 January 1866 (14 years, 280 days)	25 May 1851	7 January 1866; Wongchan Hall, Front Palace (aged 57 years, 125 days)	Rama IV
Wichaichan	Krom Phrarajawang; Bowon Wichaichan	6 September 1838; Thonburi Palace	First cousin	2 October 1868 – 28 August 1885 (16 years, 330 days)	25 November 1868	28 August 1885; Bowon Boriwat Hall, Front Palace (aged 46 years, 356 days)	Rama V

=== Rear Palace ===
Krom Phrarajawang Boworn Sathan Phimuk (กรมพระราชวังบวรสถานพิมุข), or the Rear Palace, was another office inherited from the Kingdom of Ayutthaya. However, since the founding of the dynasty there has only been one rear palace. Prince Anurak Devesh was the nephew of King Phutthayotfa Chualok (his mother Princess Thepsuthavadi was the king's elder sister) and was appointed to the office in 1785.

Portrait	Name	Birth	Relationship to Monarch	Tenure	Death	Monarch
Anurak Devesh	Prince Krom Phra; Anurak Devesh; Krom Phrarajawang Boworn Sathan Phimuk	28 March 1746; Ayutthaya	Nephew	circa 1785 – 20 December 1806	20 December 1806; Rear Palace (aged 60 years, 267 days)	Rama I

=== Crown Princes ===
The Crown Prince of Thailand or Sayam Makutrajakuman (สยามมกุฎราชกุมาร) is the designated and heir apparent to the throne and headship of the dynasty. The title was created in 1886 when King Chulalongkorn appointed his eldest son by Princess Consort Savang Vadhana, Prince Vajirunhis as Sayam Makutrajakuman. The title was copied directly from the Western tradition. Since then, there have only been three crown princes. The most recent crown prince, Maha Vajiralongkorn, was invested with the title in 1972 and became King in 2016. The succession is governed by the 1924 Palace Law of Succession passed by King Vajiravudh.

Portrait	Name	Birth	Relationship to Monarch	Became heir	Tenure	Death	Heir of
Vajirunhis	Maha Vajirunhis	27 June 1878; Grand Palace	Eighth son	14 January 1886	14 January 1886 – 4 January 1895 (8 years, 355 days)	4 January 1895; Grand Palace (16 years, 191 days)	Rama V
Vajiravudh	Maha Vajiravudh	1 January 1881; Grand Palace	Eleventh son	4 January 1895	4 January 1895 – 23 October 1910 (acceded to throne as Rama VI) (15 years, 292 days)	26 November 1925; Chakraphat Phiman Hall, Grand Palace (44 years, 329 days)	Rama V
Vajiralongkorn	Maha Vajiralongkorn	28 July 1952; Amphorn Sathan Residential Hall, Dusit Palace	Only son	28 July 1952	28 December 1972; 13 October 2016 (acceded to throne as Rama X) (43 years, 290 days)	Living (74 years, 103 days)	Rama IX

=== Queens ===
Portrait	Name	Father	Birth	Marriage	Became consort	Appointment ceremony	Ceased to be consort	Death	Spouse
House of Chakri	Queen Amarindra	Thong Na Bangxang (Na Bangxang)	15 March 1737; Amphawa	circa 1760	6 April 1782; Spouse's accession	not formally appointed	7 September 1809; Spouse's death (27 years, 154 days)	25 May 1826; Grand Palace (aged 89 years, 71 days)	Rama I
House of Chakri	Queen Sri Suriyendra	Ngoen Saetan (Tan)	21 September 1767; Amphawa	21 September 1801	7 September 1809; Spouse's accession	not formally appointed	21 July 1824; Spouse's death (14 years, 318 days)	18 October 1836; Thonburi Palace (aged 69 years, 27 days)	Rama II
House of Chakri	Princess Kunthon Thipphayawadi	Rama I of Siam (Chakri)	1798; Grand Palace	circa 1816		not formally appointed	21 July 1824; Spouse's death	16 February 1838; Bangkok	Rama II
House of Chakri	Queen Somanass Waddhanawathy	Lakkhananukhun of Siam (Chakri)	21 December 1834; Bangkok	2 January 1852		not formally appointed	10 October 1852; Grand Palace (282 days) (aged 17 years, 294 days)		Rama IV
Debsirindra	Queen Debsirindra	Siriwong of Siam, Prince of Mattayaphithak (Siriwong)	17 July 1834; Bangkok	6 January 1852		not formally appointed	9 September 1862; Grand Palace (10 years, 246 days) (aged 28 years, 54 days)		Rama IV
Phannarai	Princess Phannarai	Siriwong of Siam, Prince of Mattayaphithak (Siriwong)	9 May 1838; Bangkok	circa 1852		not formally appointed	1 October 1868; Spouse's death	22 June 1914; Tha Phra Palace, Bangkok (aged 76 years, 44 days)	Rama IV
Daksinajar	Princess Daksinajar	Rama IV of Siam (Chakri)	18 September 1852; Grand Palace	circa 1871		not formally appointed	circa 1871 divorce	13 September 1906; The Prince Divakaravongse Pravati's Palace, Bangkok (aged 53 years, 360 days)	Rama V
Saovabhark Nariratana	Princess Saovabhark Nariratana	Ladavalya of Siam, Prince Bhumindra Bhakdi (Ladavalya)	26 January 1854; Bangkok	circa 1872		not formally appointed	21 July 1887; Grand Palace (aged 33 years, 176 days)		Rama V
Ubolratana Narinaga	Princess Ubolratana Narinaga	Ladavalya of Siam, Prince Bhumindra Bhakdi (Ladavalya)	28 November 1846; Bangkok	circa 1872		not formally appointed	15 October 1901; Grand Palace (aged 54 years, 321 days)		Rama V
Sukhumala Marasri	Queen Sukhumala Marasri	Rama IV of Siam (Chakri)	10 May 1861; Grand Palace	circa 1876		not formally appointed	23 October 1910; Spouse's death	9 July 1927; Bangkhunphrom Palace, Bangkok (aged 66 years, 60 days)	Rama V
Sunanda Kumariratana	Queen Sunanda Kumariratana	Rama IV of Siam (Chakri)	10 November 1860; Grand Palace	circa 1877		not formally appointed	31 May 1880; Chao Phraya River, Pak Kret (aged 19 years, 203 days)		Rama V
Savang Vadhana	Queen Savang Vadhana	Rama IV of Siam (Chakri)	10 September 1862; Grand Palace	circa 1877		not formally appointed	23 October 1910; Spouse's death	17 December 1955; Sa Pathum Palace (aged 93 years, 98 days)	Rama V
Saovabha Phongsri	Queen Saovabha Phongsri (Queen Regent)	Rama IV of Siam (Chakri)	1 January 1864; Grand Palace	circa 1877		not formally appointed	23 October 1910; Spouse's death	20 October 1919; Phaya Thai Palace (aged 55 years, 292 days)	Rama V
Saisavali Bhiromya	Princess Saisavali Bhiromya; Krom Phra Suddhasininat	Ladavalya of Siam, Prince Bhumindra Bhakdi (Ladavalya)	4 September 1862; Bangkok	circa 1881		not formally appointed	23 October 1910; Spouse's death	24 June 1929; Suan Sunandha Palace, Bangkok (aged 66 years, 293 days)	Rama V
	Princess Dara Rasmi; Phra Ratchachaya	Inthawichayanon of Chiang Mai (Na Chiengmai)	26 August 1873; Klang Wieng Palace, Chiang Mai	4 February 1887		not formally appointed	23 October 1910; Spouse's death (23 years, 261 days)	9 December 1933; Rin Keaw Palace, Chiang Mai (aged 60 years, 105 days)	Rama V
Indrasakdi Sachi	Princess Indrasakdi Sachi	Pluem Sucharitaku, Chaophraya Suthammontri (Sucharitaku)	10 June 1902; Klong Dan House, Phasi Charoen	12 January 1922		not formally appointed	26 November 1925; Spouse's death (3 years, 318 days)	30 November 1975; Siriraj Hospital (aged 73 years, 173 days)	Rama VI
Lakshamilavan	Princess Lakshamilavan	Worawannakon, Prince Narathip Praphanphong (Vorawan)	3 July 1899; Varavarna Palace, Bangkok	27 August 1922		not formally appointed	26 November 1925; Spouse's death (3 years, 91 days)	29 August 1961; Laksamiwilat Palace, Bangkok (aged 62 years, 57 days)	Rama VI
Suvadhana	Princess Suvadhana	Lueam Abhayavongsa, Phraya Abhaibhubest (Abhayavongsa)	15 April 1906; Klong Bang Luang House, Bangkok Yai	10 August 1924		not formally appointed	26 November 1925; Spouse's death (1 year, 108 days)	10 October 1985; Siriraj Hospital (aged 79 years, 178 days)	Rama VI
Rambai Barni	Queen Rambai Barni	Svasti Sobhana, Prince Svastivatana Visishtha (Svastivatana)	20 December 1904; Bangkok	25 August 1918	26 November 1925; Spouse's accession	25 February 1926	2 March 1935; Spouse's abdication (9 years, 96 days)	22 May 1984; Sukhothai Palace (aged 79 years, 154 days)	Rama VII
Sirikit	Queen Sirikit (Queen Regent)	Nakkhatra Mangala, 2nd Prince of Chanthaburi (Kitiyakara)	12 August 1932; 1808 Rama VI Road, Pathum Wan	28 April 1950		5 May 1950	13 October 2016; Spouse's death (66 years, 168 days)	24 October 2025; Bangkok (aged 93 years, 73 days)	Rama IX
Suthida	Queen Suthida	Kham Tidjai (Tidjai)	3 June 1978; Hat Yai	1 May 2019		4 May 2019	Incumbent (7 years, 191 days)	Living (aged 48 years, 158 days)	Rama X

== Family tree ==
Chakri Dynasty Family Tree

Amarindra; 1737–1826 (Queen)	Phutthayotfa; Chulalok (Rama I); 1737–1809 r.1782–1809	Nui Yai (Concubine)
Taksin the Great of Thonburi; 1734–1782 r.1767–1782	Princess; Chim Yai –1779	Maha; Senanurak; Viceroy; 1773–1817 t.1809–1817	Praphaiwadi; Princess; Thepphayawadi; 1777–1823	Chaem Krachangfa; Princess; Si Sunthonthep; 1770–1808	House of the First; Reign	Maha Sakdi phonlasep Viceroy; 1773–1832 t.1824–1832
Aphaithibet; Prince; Krasattranuchit; 1779–1809	House of Maha; Senanurak	five other unnamed children	Sri Sulalai; 1770–1837	Phutthaloetla; Naphalai (Rama II); 1767–1824 r. 1809–1824	Sri; Suriyendra; 1767–1836 (Queen)	House of Maha; Sakdi- phonlasep
Bang (Concubine)	Nangklao (Rama III); 1787–1851 r.1824–1851	Sap (Concubine)	Prince; Nu Dam	Princess; Pom	Pinklao; Viceroy; 1808–1866 t. 1851–1866	Em (Concubine)
Lakkhananukhun	Ngiu Suvarnadat (Concubine)	Siriwong; Prince; Mattaya Phithak; 1812–1839	Noi (Concubine)	Lamom; Princess; Sudarat Ratchaprayun; 1818–1896	House of Pinklao	Wichaichan; Viceroy; 1838–1885 t.1868–1885
Somanass; Vaddhanawathy; 1834–1852 (Queen)	Samli; Bunnag (Concubine); 1835–1900	Debsirindra; 1834–1862 (Queen)	Mongkut (Rama IV); 1804–1868 r.1851–1868	Piam; Sucharitkul (Concubine); 1838–1904	Phueng; Indravimala (Concubine)
Somanas; 1852–1852	Sukhumala; Marasri; 1861–1927 (Queen)	Chulalongkorn (Rama V); 1853–1910 r. 1868–1910	Saovabha; Phongsri; 1864–1919 (Queen)	Sunandha; Kumariratana; 1860–1880 (Queen)	Sun; 1859–1949	Gagananga; Yukala; Prince Bijit; Prijakorn; 1855–1909
Paribatra; Sukhumbandhu; Prince of Nakhon Sawan; 1881–1944	Suddha; Dibyaratana; Princess of Rattanakosin; 1877–1922	Kannabhorn; Bejaratana; 1878–1880	Svasti; Sobhon; 1865–1935	Abha Barni; 1874–1938
Savang; Vadhana; 1862–1955 (Queen)	Uam; Bisalayabutra (Concubine); 1856–1877	Yai; Sucharitkul; 1858–1936	Devan; Udayawongse; Prince; Devawongse; Varopakarn; 1858–1923	Prajadhipok (Rama VII); 1893–1941 r. 1925–1935	Rambai; Barni; 1904–1984 (Queen)
Mahidol; Adulyadej the Prince; Father; 1892–1929	Srinagarindra; 1900–1995	Kitiyakara; Voralaksana; Prince of Chanthaburi I 1874–1931	Apsarasaman; Devakula; 1877–1939	Vajiravudh (Rama VI); 1881–1925 r. 1910–1925	Suvadhana; Princess; Consort; 1905–1985
Aram; Rattanakul; Serireongrit m.1944 d.1950	Galyani; Vadhana; Princess of Naradhiwas; 1923–2008	Ananda; Mahidol (Rama VIII); 1925–1946 r.1935–1946	Nakkhatra; Mangala; Prince of Chanthaburi II; 1897–1953	Bua; Snidvongse; 1909–1999	Bejaratana; Rajasuda; 1925–2011
Dhasanawalaya; Sornsongkram; 1945–	Sinthu; Sornsongkram; 1940–	Bhumibol; Adulyadej (Rama IX); 1927–2016 r.1946–2016	Sirikit; 1932–2025 (Queen)	Adulakit; Kitiyakara; 1930–2004	Bandhusavali; Yugala; 1934–	Busba; Kitiyakara; 1934–	Kalyanakit; Kitiyakara; 1929–1987
Jitat; Sornsongkram; 1974–	Peter; Ladd; Jensen m.1972 div.1998	Ubol Ratana; 1951–	Sirindhorn; 1955–	Sarali; Kitiyakara; 1966–
Ploypailin; Jensen; 1981–	Poom Jensen; 1983–2004	Yuvadhida; Polpraserth; 1962–	Vajiralongkorn (Rama X); 1952– r.2016–	Srirasmi; Suwadee m.2001 div.2014–	Soamsawali; 1957–	Chulabhorn; 1957–	Virayudh; Tishyasarin m.1982 div.1996
Sirikitiya; Jensen; 1985–	Juthavachara; Vivacharawongse; 1979–	Vacharaesorn; Vivacharawongse; 1981–	Chakriwat; Vivacharawongse; 1983–	Dipangkorn; Rasmijoti; 2005–	Bajrakitiyabha; 1978–2026	Siribha; Chudabhorn; 1982–	Aditayadorn; Kitikhun; 1984–
Vatchrawee; Vivacharawongse; 1985–	Sirivannavari; 1987–

== Cadet houses ==
=== Royal houses ===
Siblings of King Rama I (both brothers and sisters)
No.	Surname	Thai	Descended from
1	Narindrānkura	นรินทรางกูร	Prince Tongjeen, the Prince (Kromma Luang) Narinthra Ronnares
2	Devahastin (other spelling: Thephasadin)	เทพหัสดิน	Prince Ton, the Prince (Kromma Luang) Deva Hariraksa
3	Montrikul	มนตรีกุล	Prince Jui, the Prince (Kromma Luang) Pitaksa Montri
4	Isarānkura	อิศรางกูร	Prince Kes, the Prince (Kromma Kun) Issara Nuraksa
5	Narindrakula	นรินทรกุล	Princess Ku, the Princess (Kromma Luang) Naridara Dhevi
6	Cheshtānkura	เจษฎางกูร	Prince La, the Prince (Kromma Luang) Chakra Jesada

Descendants of King Rama I
No.	Surname	Thai	Descended from
1	Indrāngura	อินทรางกูร	Prince Tuptim, the Prince (Komma Muen) Intrapipit
2	Dabbakula	ทัพพะกุล	Prince Tup, the Prince (Kromma Muen) Chita Bhakdi
3	Suriyakul	สุริยกุล	Prince Suriya, the Prince (Kromma Pra) Ram Isares
4	Chatrakul	ฉัตรกุล	Prince Chatra, the Prince (Kromma Muen) Surintra Raksa
5	Phungbun	พึ่งบุญ	Prince Kraisorn, the Prince (Kromma Luang) Raksa Ranares
6	Tārākara	ดารากร	Prince Darakara, the Prince (Kromma Muen) Sri Suthep
7	Duangchakra	ดวงจักร	Prince Duangchakra, the Prince (Kromma Muen Narong Kahariraksa
8	Sudasna	สุทัศน์	Prince Sutasana, the Prince (Kromma Muen) Kraisorn Vichit

Descendants of King Rama II
No.	Surname	Thai	Descended from
1	Mālakul	มาลากุล	Prince Mahamala, the Prince (Krom Praya) Bumraap Porapuksa
2	Abharanakul	อาภรณกุล	Prince Abhorn
3	Klauaymai	กล้วยไม้	Prince Klauaymai, the Prince (Kromma Muen) Sunthorn Thipbodi
4	Kusuma	กุสุมา	Prince Kusuma, the Prince (Kromma Muen) Sepsunthorn
5	Tejātivongse	เดชาติวงศ์	Prince Mung, the Prince (Krom Somdetch Pra) Dejadisorn
6	Phanomvan	พนมวัน	Prince Panomwan, the Prince (Kromma Pra) Pipit Pokpubentra
7	Kunjara	กุญชร	Prince Gunchara, the Prince (Kromma Pra) Pitaksa Tevesra
8	Renunandana	เรณุนันทน์	Prince Renu
9	Niyamisara	นิยมิศร	Prince Niem
10	Dinakara	ทินกร	Prince Tinakorn, the Prince (Kromma Luang) Bhuvaneth Narintararith
11	Baidurya	ไพฑูรย์	Prince Baidurya, the Prince (Kromma Muen) Sanit Narentra
12	Mahākul	มหากุล	Prince Toe, the Prince (Kromma Luang) Mahisa Varintaramres
13	Vajrivansa	วัชรีวงศ์	Prince Klang, the Prince (Kromma Pra) Teves Vacharintra
14	Xumsaeng	ชุมแสง	Prince Chumsang, the Prince (Kromma Luang) Sappasilpa Pricha
15	Sanidvongs	สนิทวงศ์	Prince Nuam, the Prince (Kromma Luang) Wongsa Dhiraj Snid
16	Morakot	มรกฏ	Prince Morakot, the Prince (Kromma Kun) Satitya Sataporn
17	Nilaratna	นิลรัตน์	Prince Nilratana, the Prince (Kromma Muen) Alongkot Kitpricha
18	Arunvongse	อรุณวงศ์	Prince Arunwongse, the Prince (Kromma Luang) Vorasakda Pisal
19	Kapitthā	กปิตถา	Prince Kapittha, the Prince (Kromma Muen) Bhubal Boriraksa
20	Pramoja (other spelling: Pramoj)	ปราโมช	Prince Pramoj, the Prince (Kromma Kun) Vorachakra Dharanubhap

Descendants of King Rama III
No.	Surname	Thai	Descended from
1	Sirivongse	ศิริวงศ์	Prince Siriwongse, the Prince (Kromma Muen) Mataya Pitaksa
2	Komen	โกเมน	Prince Komen, the Prince (Kromma Muen) Chetha Dhibentara
3	Ganechara	คเนจร	Prince Kanejorn, the Prince (Kromma Muen) Amarendhara Bodintara
4	Ngon-rath	งอนรถ	Prince Ngonroth
5	Latāvalya	ลดาวัลย์	Prince Ladawalya
6	Xumsai (other spelling: Chumsai, Jumsai)	ชุมสาย	Prince Chumsai, the Prince (Kromma Kun) Rajasiha Vikrom
7	Piyakara	ปิยากร	Prince Piak
8	Uraibongse	อุไรพงศ์	Prince Urai, the Prince (Kromma Muen) Adulyalaksana Sombat
9	Arnob	อรณพ	Prince Annop, the Prince (Kromma Muen) Udomratana Rasi
10	Lamyong	ลำยอง	Prince Lamyong
11	Suparna	สุบรรณ	Prince Subarn, the Prince (Kromma Kun) Bhuvanai Naruebentradhibal
12	Sinharā	สิงหรา	Prince Singhara, the Prince (Kromma Luang) Bodintara Paisalsobhon
13	Jambūnud	ชมพูนุช	Prince Chompunuj, the Prince (Kromma Kun) Chareonpol Pulsvasti

Descendants of King Rama IV
No.	Surname	Thai	Descended from
1	Chakrabandhu	จักรพันธุ์	Prince (Chao Fa) Chaturonrasmi, the Prince (Kroma Pra) Chakrabatdibhongse
2	Bhānubandhu	ภาณุพันธุ์	Prince (Chao Fa) Bhanurangsi Savangwongse, the Prince (Krom Praya) Bhanubandhuwongse Varadej
3	Chitrabongs	จิตรพงศ์	Prince Chitcharoen, the Prince (Krom Praya) Narisara Nuvadtivongs
4	Navavongsa (other spelling: Napawongse, Nopawongse)	นพวงศ์	Prince Nobawongse, the Prince (Kromma Meun) Mahaysuan Sivavilas
5	Supratishtha	สุประดิษฐ์	Prince Supradishtha, the Prince (Kromma Meun) Vishnunath Nibhadhara
6	Kritākara (other spelling: Kridakara, Kridakorn)	กฤดากร	Prince Krida Bhinihan, the Prince (Kroma Pra) Naretraworit
7	Gaganānga	คัคณางค	Prince Gagananga Yukala, the Prince (Kroma Luang) Pichit Preechakara
8	Sukhasvasti	ศุขสวัสดิ์	Prince Suksvasti, the Prince (Kroma Luang) Adisara Udomdej
9	Dvivongs	ทวีวงศ์	Prince Davi Davalyalarp, the Prince (Kroma Muen) Bhutaresara Dhamrongsakdi
10	Thongyai	ทองใหญ่	Prince Thongkong Konyai, the Prince (Kroma Luang) Prachaksa Silpakom
11	Kshemasanta	เกษมสันต์	Prince Kashemsanta Sobhaga, the Prince (Kroma Luang) Brahma Varanuraksa
12	Kamalāsana	กมลาศน์	Prince Kamalasana Lersan, the Prince (Kroma Muen) Rajsakdi Samosorn
13	Kshemasrī (other spelling: Kashemsri, Kasemsri)	เกษมศรี	Prince Kashemsri Subhayok, the Prince (Kroma Muen) Tivakarawongse Pravati
14	Sridhavaja	ศรีธวัช	Prince Srisiddhi Thongjaya, the Prince (Kroma Kun) Siridhaj Sanggas
15	Thongthaem	ทองแถม	Prince Thongtham Davalyawongse, the Prince (Kroma Luang) Sappasatara Subhakij
16	Jumbala	ชุมพล	Prince Chumbala Sompoj, the Prince (Kroma Luang) Sappasiddhi Prasonga
17	Devakula	เทวกุล	Prince Devan Uthaiwongse, the Prince (Krom Praya) Devawongse Varopakarn
18	Svastikula	สวัสดิกุล	Prince Svasti Pravati, the Prince (Kroma Pra) Somata Amornbandhu
19	Chandradatta	จันทรทัต	Prince Chandradhat Chudhadhar, the Prince (Kroma Muen) Vividhawarn Preecha
20	Jayānkura	ชยางกูร	Prince Jaiyanuchit, the Prince (Kroma Muen) Pongsadisara Mahib
21	Varavarna	วรวรรณ	Prince Voravannakara, the Prince (Kroma Pra) Naradhip Prapanpongse
22	Tisakula (other spelling: Diskul)	ดิศกุล	Prince Disvorakumarn, the Prince (Krom Praya) Damrong Rajanubhab
23	Sobhanga	โสภางค์	Prince Sri Saowabhanga
24	Sonakul	โสณกุล	Prince Sonabandhit, the Prince (Kroma Kun) Pitayalarb Pruethidhada
25	Vadhanavongs	วัฒนวงศ์	Prince Vadhananuwongse, the Prince (Kroma Kun) Marupongsa Siripattana
26	Svastivatana	สวัสดิวัตน์	Prince Svasti Sobhana, the Prince (Kroma Pra) Svasti Vadhanavisidha
27	Jayanta	ไชยันต์	Prince Jayanta Mongkol, the Prince (Kroma Muen) Mahisara Rajharuetai

Descendants of King Rama V
No.	Surname	Thai	Descended from
1	Kitiyākara	กิติยากร	Prince Kitiyakara Voralaksana, Prince (Kromma Pra) of Chanthaburi
2	Rabībadhana	รพีพัฒน์	Prince Raphi Phatthanasak, Prince (Kromma Luang) of Rajaburi
3	Pavitra	ประวิตร	Prince Pravitra Vadhanodom, Prince (Kromma Luang) of Prachin
4	Chirapravati	จิรประวัติ	Prince Chirapravati Voradej, Prince (Kromma Luang) of Nakorn Jaisri
5	Ābhākara	อาภากร	Prince Abhakara Kiartivongse, Prince (Kromma Luang) of Chumphon
6	Paribatra	บริพัตร	Prince Paribatra Sukhumbandhu, Prince (Kromma Pra) of Nakon Sawan
7	Chhatr-jaya	ฉัตรชัย	Prince Purachatra Jayakara, Prince (Kromma Pra) of Kamphaengphet
8	Beñ-badhana	เพ็ญพัฒน์	Prince Benbadhanabongse, Prince (Kromma Muen) of Phichai
9	Chakrabongs	จักรพงษ์	Prince Chakrabongse Bhuvanath, Prince (Kromma Luang) of Phitsanulok
10	Yugala (other spelling: Yukol)	ยุคล	Prince Yugala Dighambara, Prince (Kromma Luang) of Lopburi
11	Vudhijaya	วุฒิชัย	Prince Vudhijaya Chalermlabha, the Prince (Kromma Luang) Singhavikrom Kriangkrai
12	Suriyong	สุริยง	Prince Suriyong Prayurabandhu, the Prince (Kromma Muen) Jaiya Sri Suriyopas
13	Rangsit	รังสิต	Prince Rangsit Prayurasakdi, Prince (Krom Praya) of Chainat
14	Mahidol (original spelling: Mahitala)	มหิดล	Prince Mahidol Adulyadej, Prince (Kromma Luang) of Songkhla, progenitor of the current Royal Family
15	Chudādhuj	จุฑาธุช	Prince Chudadhuj Dharadilok, Prince (Kromma Kun) of Bejrapurana
15.1	Varanand	วรานันท์	Prince Varananda Dhavaj, son of Prince Chudadhuj Dharadilok, opted to use a new surname of Varanand for his children, instead of Chudadhuj. It was assumed that was because his wife was not Thai, but English.

Adopted son of King Rama VII
No.	Surname	Thai	Descended from
1	Sakdidej Bhanubhandhu	ศักดิเดช ภาณุพันธุ์	Prince Chirasakdi Suprabhat. Although King Rama VII did not have any children, he adopted a cousin, youngest son of Prince Bhanurangsi Savangwongse, the Prince (Krom Praya) Bhanubandhuwongse Varadej.

Descendants of King Rama IX and King Rama X
No.	Surname	Thai	Descended from
1	Vivacharawongse	วิวัชรวงศ์	King Vajiralongkorn (King Rama X), when he was the Crown Prince.

=== Viceregal houses ===
Descendants of Maha Sura Singhanat
No.	Surname	Thai	Descended from
1	Asuni	อสุนี	Prince Asuni, the Prince (Komma Muen) Senithep
2	Sankhadat	สังขทัต	Prince Sungkatat, the Prince (Kromma Kun) Naranuchit
3	Padmasinha	ปัทมสิงห	Prince Bua
4	Nirasinha	นีรสิงห์	Prince Ner

Descendants of Anurak Devesh
No.	Surname	Thai	Descended from
1	Pālakavangsa	ปาลกะวงษ์	Prince Pan, the Prince (Kramma Muen) Naratevesra
2	Seniwongse	เสนีย์วงศ์	Prince Dang, the Prince (Kromma Luang) Seni Boriraksa

Descendants of Maha Senanurak
No.	Surname	Thai	Descended from
1	Israsenā	อิศรเสนา	Prince Pongsa Isaresra, the Prince (Kromma Muen) Kasatriya Srisakdidej
2	Panyankasenā	บรรยงกะเสนา	Prince Prayong, the Prince (Kromma Kun) Dhibesra Bavorn
3	Byagghasenā	พยัคฆเสนา	Prince Sua
4	Bhumrindra	ภุมรินทร์	Prince Bhumarindara
5	Ransisenā	รังสิเสนา	Prince Yai
6	Sahāvudha	สหาวุธ	Prince Chumsaeng
7	Yugandhara	ยุคันธร	Prince Yukandara, the Prince (Kromma Muen) Anantakarn Rithi
8	Sisankha	สีสังข์	Prince Seesangka
9	Rajanikara	รัชนีกร	Prince Rajnikorn
10	Rongthrong	รองทรง	Prince Rongthong, the Prince (Kromma Muen) Siddhi Sukhumkarn

Descendants of Sakdiphonlasep
No.	Surname	Thai	Descended from
1	Anujasakdi	อนุชศักดิ์	Prince Nuj
2	Kambhu	กำภู	Prince Kambhu
3	Kesarā	เกสะรา	Prince Kesra, the Prince (Kromma Muen) Anubhap Pisalsakda
4	Israsakdi	อิศรศักดิ์	Prince (Chao Fa) Isarapongsa
5	Nandisakdi	นันทิศักดิ์	Prince Reung Kanong

Descendants of Pinklao
No.	Surname	Thai	Descended from
1	Navaratna (other spelling: Navaratana, Navarat)	นวรัตน	Prince Naovaratana, the Prince (Kromma Muen) Satitaya Dhamrongsakda
2	Sudharos	สุธารส	Prince Sudharos
3	Toshaniya	โตษะณีย์	Prince Tosini
4	Vararatna	วรรัตน์	Prince Voraratana, the Prince (Kromma Muen) Pisal Bavorasakda
5	Bhānumasa	ภาณุมาศ	Prince Bhanumas
6	Hastindra	หัสดินทร์	Prince Hasdindara, the Prince (Kromma Muen) Boriraksa Narindararitti
7	Nandavan	นันทวัน	Prince Nanthawan
8	Yugandharānanda	ยุคนธรานนท์	Prince Yukundara
9	Charunrochna	จรูญโรจน์	Prince Charoonroj Ruengsri, the Prince (Kromma Muen) Charasporn Padipan
10	Prommes	พรหมเมศ	Prince Prommes
11	Saysanan	สายสนั่น	Prince Saisanan

Descendants of Wichaichan
No.	Surname	Thai	Descended from
1	Vilayavongs	วิไลยวงศ์	Prince Vilai Voravilas
2	Kānchanavichai	กาญจนวิชัย	Prince Kanjanopas Rasmi, the Prince (Kromma Muen) Charnvijaiya Bavornyos
3	Rajani	รัชนี	Prince Rajani Chamcharas, the Prince (Kromma Muen) Bidyalongkorn
4	Kalyānavongs	กัลยาณวงศ์	Prince Kalayana Pravati, the Prince (Kromma Muen) Kavipojana Suprija
5	Sudasaniya	สุทัศนีย์	Prince Sutasna Nibhadorn
6	Varavudhi	วรวุฒิ	Prince Voravudhi Abara Rajakumar
7	Ruchavijai	รุจจวิชัย	Prince Ruja Vorachavi
8	Visuddhi	วิสุทธิ	Prince Bavora Visudhi

== See also ==
- Monarchy of Thailand
- List of monarchs of Thailand
- List of Thai royal consorts
- Rattanakosin era
- 1924 Palace Law on Succession
- Rama (Kings of Thailand)
- Order of the Royal House of Chakri
- Privy Council of Thailand
- Regent of Thailand
- Migrant education
- Education for Liberation of Siam
- Freedom of religion

== Notes ==
— Royal house — Chakri dynasty Founding year: 1782
Preceded by Thonburi Kingdom	Ruling dynasty of the Kingdom of Siam/Thailand (Rattanakosin Kingdom); 6 April 1782 − present day	Incumbent
