= Adulakit Kitiyakara =

Thai politician and judge

Mom Rajawongse Adulakit Kitiyakara PCh MPCh MWM PC
- อดุลกิติ์ กิติยากร
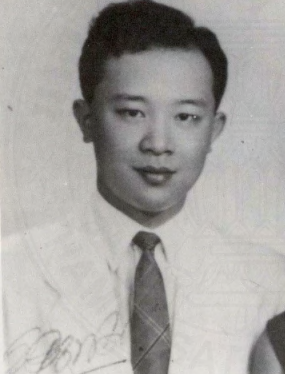
- Adulakit in 1950s

Privy Councillor of Thailand
- In office 9 April 1992 – 5 May 2004
- Monarch: Bhumibol Adulyadej

Personal details
- Born: 2 November 1930 Bangkok, Siam (now Thailand)
- Died: 5 May 2004 (aged 73) Bangkok, Thailand
- Spouse: Princess Bandhusawali Yugala (m. 1956)
- Children: Princess Soamsawali; Sarali Kitiyakara
- Parents: Nakkhatra Mangala, Prince of Chantaburi II (father); Bua Snidvongs (mother)
- Education: Saint Gabriel's College
- Alma mater: Middle Temple
- Profession: Lawyer

Mom Rajawongse Adulakit Kitiyakara (Thai: อดุลกิติ์ กิติยากร; RTGS: Adunlakit Kitiyakon: 2 November 1930 – 5 May 2004), was the chief-president of the supreme judicature of Thailand, and former member of the Privy Council of Thailand. He was a member of the House of Kitiyakara, the Princely House descended from the Chakri dynasty. He was the elder brother of Queen Sirikit, consort of King Bhumibol Adulyadej (Rama IX) of Thailand.

== Biography ==
Mom Rajawongse Adulakit was born on 2 November 1930, at Deves Palace in Bangkok. He was the second son of Prince (Mom Chao) Nakkhatra Mangkala (later the Prince of Chantaburi II, son of Prince Kitiyakara Voralaksana, Prince of Chantaburi) and Mom Luang Bua Sanidvongs. His name was given by King Prajadhipok (Rama VII) of Siam. His name means The great honorary.

He had three siblings: one elder brother and two younger sisters:

- Prof. Dr. Mom Rajawongse Kalyanakit Kitiyakara (born 20 September 1929, died 15 May 1987)
- Mom Rajawongse Sirikit Kitiyakara (later Queen Sirikit of Thailand) (born 12 August 1932, died 24 October 2025)
- Mom Rajawongse Busba Kitiyakara (born 2 August 1934)

When he was 2, his father was created Charge d' affaires of Washington, D.C., after the 1932 Siamese Revolution. And Mom Luang Bua, his consort followed his husband to the United States after gave birth to the first daughter, Mom Rajawongse Sirikit. The couple moved to the United States with their first son Mom Rajawongse Kalyanakit Kitiyakara. He lived with his grandmother Princess (Mom Chao) Apsornsaman Kitiyakara and his aunt Mom Chao Chitbanchong Kitiyakara.

== Education and work ==
Mom Rajawongse Adulakit graduated from Saint Gabriel's College. After his father was appointed Ambassador to the Court of St. James's, (i.e. Ambassador to the United Kingdom), he studied engineering in Portsmouth Technical College. After having graduated from college, he continued to study law at the Inn of Court (Middle Temple), the famous law school in England.

When he moved back to Thailand, he continued studying at The Institute of Legal Education of The Thai Bar. After graduation, he worked as a judge in Ministry of Justice. Moreover, he worked as a teacher in the faculty of law, Thammasat University. In 1966, King Bhumibol Adulyadej created him a judge of Chiang Mai Court. He and his family moved to Chiang Mai for 3 years. Later in 1974, he studied at the National Defence College of Thailand. After graduation, he was created President of Children and Family Court until he retired. He has been a member of the Privy Council since then.

== Marriage ==
While he was in England, he met his cousin, Princess Phasawali Yugala (daughter of Prince Bhanubandhu Yugala and Mom Luang Soiraya Sanidvongse). Their relatives was from Mom Rajawongse Suvabandhu Sanidvongse, Princess Phansawali's grandfather was the elder brother of Mom Rajawongse Sadan Sanidvongse, Adulakit's grandfather. They began engaged in February 1956. And then came back to Thailand. The marriage was performed by King Bhumibol Adulyadej and Queen Sirikit, Adulakit's younger sister at Klai Kangwon Palace.

The couple have 2 daughters:

- Mom Luang Soamsawali Kitiyakara, (born 13 July 1957) later Princess Soamsawali of Thailand, married Crown Prince Maha Vajiralongkorn, has 1 daughter, then divorced in 1991.
- Mom Luang Sarali Kitiyakara, (born 8 April 1966) married Thiradej Chirathiwat, has 2 sons.

Mom Rajawongse Adulyakit Kitiyakara died on 5 May 2004, at Bangkok Hospital, at the age of 74.

== Royal decorations ==
- Knight Grand Cross (First Class) of the Most Illustrious Order of Chula Chom Klao (1991)
- Knight Grand Cordon (Special Class) of the Most Exalted Order of the White Elephant (1989)
- Knight Grand Cordon (Special Class) of the Most Noble Order of the Crown of Thailand (1985)
- Chakrabarti Mala Medal (1988)
- King Rama IX Royal Cypher Medal, 2nd Class (1992)

== Ancestry ==
Ancestors of Adulakit Kitiyakara

8. King Chulalongkorn, Rama V of Siam
4. Prince Kitiyakara Voralaksana, Prince of Chanthaburi I
9. Uam Bisalayaputra
2. Prince Nakkhatra Mangkala, Prince of Chanthaburi II
10. Prince Devan Udayawongse, Prince Devawongse Varoprakar
5. Princess Apsarasaman Devakula
11. Yai Sucharitakul
1. Adulakit Kitiyakara
12. Prince Sai Snidvongs of Siam
6. Sathan Snidvongs, Chaophraya Wongsanupraphat
13. Khian Sasisamit
3. Bua Snidvongs
14. Ruai Bunyathon
7. Bang Bunyathon, Thao Wanida Phicharini
15. Wae Na Bangxang

== Sources ==
- Ancestor of the Royal Houses from the Chakri Dynasty
