= Bandhusawali Kitiyakara =

Thai nobility (1933–2025)

Than Phu Ying Bandhusawali Kitiyakara
- พันธุ์สวลี กิติยากร
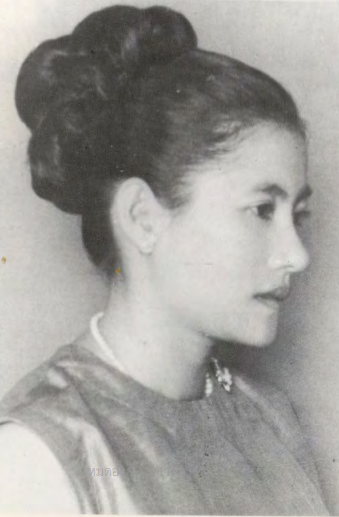
- Born: Bandhusawali Yugala; September 24, 1933; Bangkok, Siam
- Died: June 10, 2025 (aged 91); Bangkok, Thailand
- Spouse: Adulakit Kitiyakara (m. 1956; died 2004)
- Children: Princess Soamsawali; Sarali Kitiyakara
- Parents: Prince Bhanubandhu Yugala (father); Soiraya Yugala (mother)

Than Phu Ying Bandhusawali Kitiyakara (Note: Thai: ท่านผู้หญิงพันธุ์สวลี กิติยากร; formerly Mom Chao Bandhusawali Yugala) (24 September 1933 – 10 June 2025), was a Thai noblewoman and former member of the Thai royal family. She was a daughter of Prince Bhanubandhu Yugala and Mom Luang Soiraya Yugala, the mother of Princess Soamsawali, Princess Suddhanarinatha, an aunt-by-marriage of King Vajiralongkorn (Rama X), and the maternal grandmother of Princess Bajrakitiyabha.

She relinquished her royal title of Mom Chao (Princess) on 10 April 1956 in order to marry Mom Rajawongse Adulakit Kitiyakara, the elder brother of Queen Sirikit.

== Biography ==
=== Early life ===
Than Phu Ying Bandhusawali Kitiyakara was born as Princess Bandhusawali Yugala. Her informal name was Than Ying Pim. She was the eldest child of Prince Bhanubandhu Yugala and Mom Luang Soiraya Yugala (née Sanidvongs).

Princess Bandhusawali graduated high school from Rajini School in 1950 before continuing her education in England.

=== Marriage and issue ===
Princess Bandhusawali met Adulakit Kitiyakara at a gathering of Thai students in the United Kingdom, which marked the beginning of their relationship. To proceed with their marriage, she requested royal permission to resign from her status as a member of the royal family on 10 April 1956. The wedding took place on 4 April 1956. The couple had two daughters:

1. Princess Soamsawali, the Princess Suddhanarinatha (formerly Mom Luang Soamsawali Kitiyakara; born 13 July 1957), who married and later divorced King Vajiralongkorn (while he was Crown Prince). They have one daughter, Princess Bajrakitiyabha.
2. Mom Luang Sarali Kitiyakara (formerly named Mom Luang Nathapha Kitiyakara; born 8 April 1966), who married and later divorced Thirayuth Chirathivat, with whom she has two sons, Suthakit and Sitthikit Chirathivat. She later remarried Wuttisak Rattanasuwan.

=== Death ===
Than Phu Ying Bandhusawali Kitiyakara died peacefully in the early morning of 10 June 2025 at King Chulalongkorn Memorial Hospital at the age of 91. King Vajiralongkorn granted a royal Kot (royal funerary urn) and a full traditional set of regalia for her funerary rites.

On 11 June 2025, the King commanded Princess Maha Chakri Sirindhorn to represent him at the royal bathing water ceremony at the Bannaros Phak Pavilion of Wat Benchamabophit Dusitwanaram. The King later appointed Prince Chalermsuk Yugala to represent him in presiding over the subsequent royal Buddhist merit-making services marking the 7-day, 50-day, and 100-day cycles of her passing.

On 7 February 2026, King Vajiralongkorn and Queen Suthida personally presided over her royal cremation ceremony at the Royal Crematorium of Wat Debsirindrawas.

== Honours and titles ==
=== Styles ===
- 24 September 1933 – 10 April 1956
  - Her Serene Highness Princess Bandhusawali Yugala (Thai: หม่อมเจ้าพันธุ์สวลี ยุคล)
- 5 May 1989 – 10 June 2025
  - Than Phu Ying Bandhusawali Kitiyakara (Thai: ท่านผู้หญิงพันธุ์สวลี กิติยากร)

=== Decorations ===
- Grand Cross (First Class) of the Most Illustrious Order of Chula Chom Klao (1989)
- Knight Grand Cordon (Special Class) of the Most Exalted Order of the White Elephant (1997)
- Knight Grand Cordon (Special Class) of the Most Noble Order of the Crown of Thailand (1995)
- King Bhumibol Adulyadej Coronation Medal (1950)

=== Eponyms ===
- Phra Phuttha Suwan Bandhusawali Mongkhon Pradit Buddha image, Wat Thong Thua, Chanthaburi Province
