= Edna Sarah Cole =

American missionary (1855–1950)

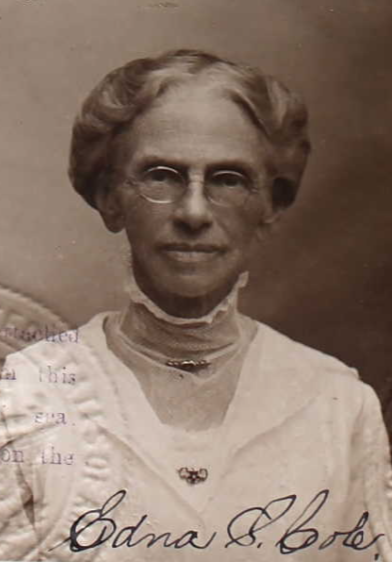
- Edna Sarah Cole, from her 1919 passport application
- Born: January 1, 1855; Trenton, Illinois, U.S.
- Died: November 23, 1950 (age 95); St. Joseph, Missouri, U.S.
- Occupations: Presbyterian missionary, educator, school principal

Edna Sarah Cole (January 1, 1855 – November 23, 1950) was an American Presbyterian missionary who worked in Siam (Thailand) from the late 19th through early 20th centuries. She was principal of the Wang Lang Girls' School in Bangkok, the precursor to Wattana Wittaya Girls Academy.

Margaret Landon consulted Cole's letters home to her sister in the United States in her research for writing Anna and the King of Siam.

== Early life ==
Cole was born in Trenton, Illinois, the daughter of Joseph S. Cole and Sarah Fairbanks Cole. She trained as a teacher in St. Louis, and attended the Western Female Seminary in Oxford, Ohio.

== Career ==
Cole became a Presbyterian missionary under the auspices of the Board of Foreign Missions in 1875, and sailed for southeast Asia that year. She was principal of girls' school at the Chiang Mai Mission Station from 1878 to 1883. She worked with her old classmate, Mary Margaretta Campbell, at Chiang Mai, until Campbell died by drowning in 1881. After a furlough in the United States in 1883 and 1884, she returned to work in Bangkok, where she taught and was principal at the Harriet M. House School, known as the Wang Lang Girls' School, beginning in 1885. She took a leave of absence in India in 1899, "made necessary by seven years of work so severe and exhausting that few could have borne the strain". In 1892, and in 1904 and 1905, she lectured about her work in the United States.

Cole was an energetic head of the school; she launched a student magazine in 1892, wrote plays, worked on writing a "new geography of Siam", invested in land and modern buildings to expand the school, and renamed the school as the Wattana Wittaya Academy, a name that projected ideas of progress and prosperity. Cole retired in 1923, but stayed in Bangkok for several years afterwards, and was an honored attendee at an event marking the centenary of Protestant missions in Siam in 1929.

Cole was an early and active member of the Siam Society. Her students included Sangwan Talaphat—the future Princess Mother Srinagarindra—who studied English with Cole before pursuing further education in the United States and meeting Prince Mahidol Adulyadej. Novelist and fellow missionary Margaret Landon knew Cole well, and consulted Cole's letters home to her sister in the United States in her research for writing Anna and the King of Siam.

== Personal life and legacy ==
Cole returned to the United States permanently in 1930, and died in 1950, in St. Joseph, Missouri, at the age of 95. In 1975, Wattana Wittaya Academy marked its centennial and honored Edna S. Cole as one of the school's leaders. In 2005, a commemorative book about Cole was published in Thai, to mark the 150th anniversary of her birth. The secondary students of Wattana Wittaya Academy created art for an exhibit, “In Remembrance of the Achievements of Miss. Edna Sara Cole”, displayed at the school in 2022. The school also has a building named in her memory.
