= Hemvadi =

Thai princess (1892–1972)

Princess Hemvadi
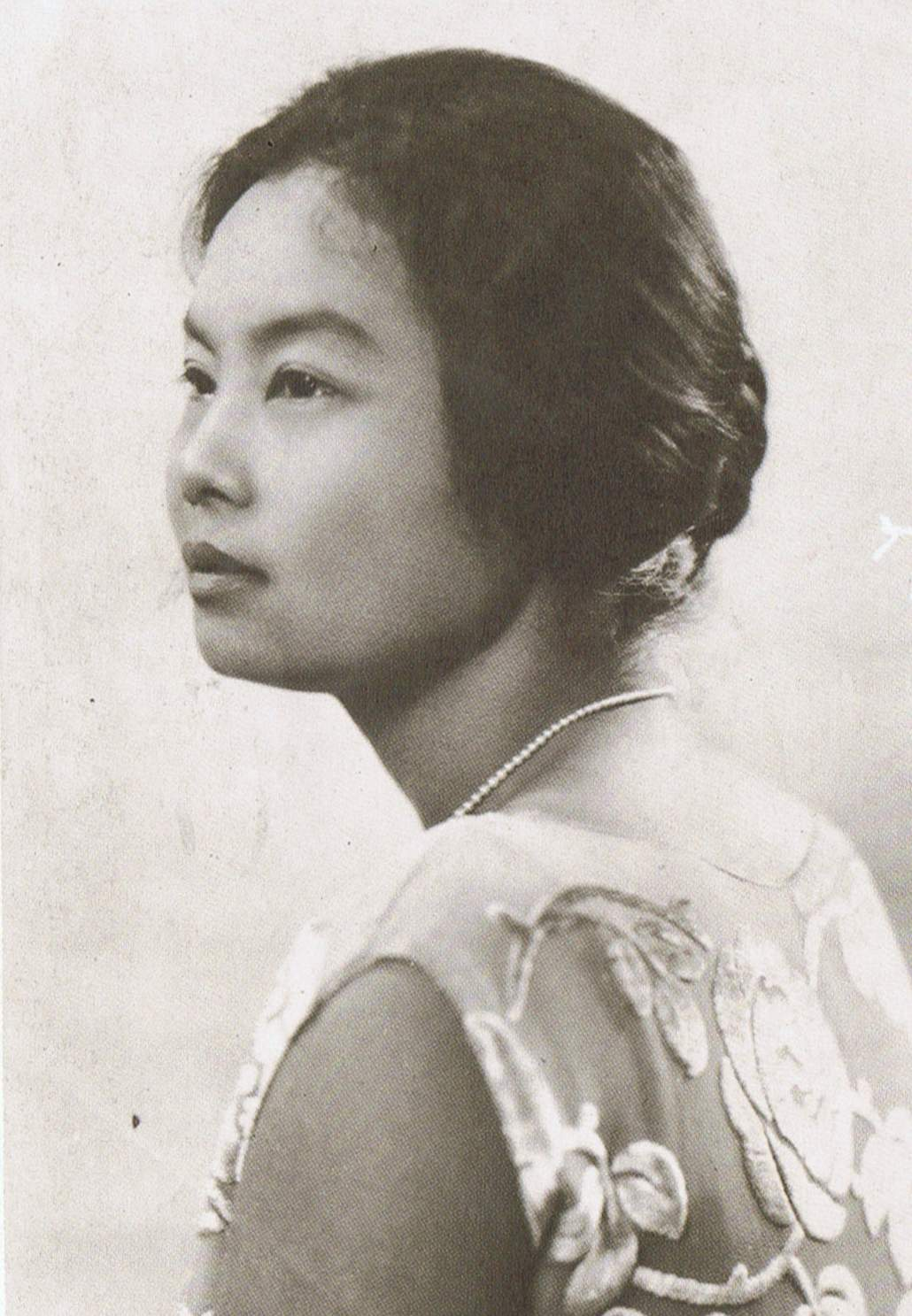
- Born: Mandhana Bhavadi; 12 January 1892; Grand Palace; Bangkok, Siam
- Died: 17 October 1972 (aged 80); Bangkok, Thailand
- House: Chakri dynasty
- Father: Chulalongkorn (Rama V)
- Mother: Hem Amatayakul

Princess Hemvadi (Thai: พระเจ้าบรมวงศ์เธอ พระองค์เจ้าเหมวดี), informally known as Sadet Phra Ong Hem, was the youngest daughter of King Chulalongkorn (Rama V) and Hem Amatayakul (daughter of Phraya Thammasarnniti Wichitphakdi (Plub Amatayakul). She was born on 12 January 1892 (1893 according to the modern calendar). Originally named Princess Mandhanabhavadi, her father, King Chulalongkorn, renamed her Princess Hemvadi on 8 January 1898 (1899 according to the modern calendar) when she was six years old.

Princess Hemavadi resided at Ratchathat Palace, which is currently the site behind the Anantara Siam Bangkok Hotel on Ratchadamri Road, Bangkok.

She was one of the few daughters of King Rama V who lived through the reign of King Bhumibol Adulyadej (Rama IX) and was among the last surviving members of her generation. The Princess died on 17 October 1972 from renal failure at the age of 80. Their Majesties King Bhumibol Adulyadej and Queen Sirikit presided over her royal cremation ceremony on 28 February 1973 at the Royal Crematorium, Wat Debsirindrawas Ratchaworawiharn.

== Royal Decorations ==
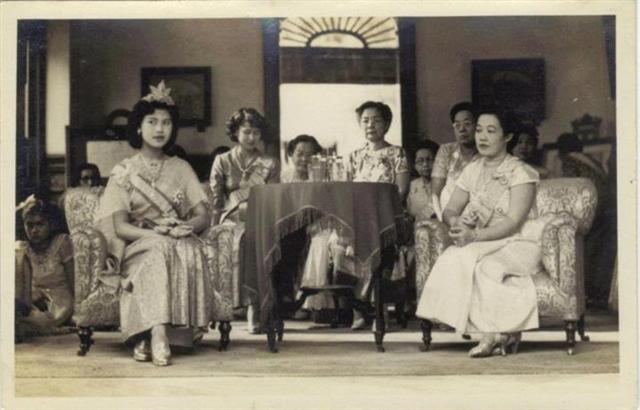
Queen Sirikit (Far left), Princess Galyani Vadhana (center), Princess Hemvadi, Princess Adisaya Suriyabha, Princess Adorn Dibyanibha and Queen Rambhai Barni (right) in 1950

- Dame of The Most Illustrious Order of the Royal House of Chakri: received 9 May 1950
- Dame Cross of the Most Illustrious Order of Chula Chom Klao (First class): received 2 May 1950

== Ancestry ==
Ancestor of Princess Hemvadi
Princess Hemvadi	Father: Chulalongkorn, King Rama V of Siam	Paternal Grandfather: Mongkut, King Rama IV of Siam	Paternal Great-grandfather: Buddha Loetla Nabhalai, King Rama II of Siam
Princess Hemvadi	Father: Chulalongkorn, King Rama V of Siam	Paternal Grandfather: Mongkut, King Rama IV of Siam	Paternal Great-grandmother: Queen Sri Suriyendra
Princess Hemvadi	Father: Chulalongkorn, King Rama V of Siam	Paternal Grandmother: Queen Debsirindra	Paternal Great-grandfather: Prince Sirivongse, the Prince Matayabidaksa
Princess Hemvadi	Father: Chulalongkorn, King Rama V of Siam	Paternal Grandmother: Queen Debsirindra	Paternal Great-grandmother: Mom Noi Sirivongs na Ayudhya
Princess Hemvadi	Mother: Chao Chom Manda Ham Amatayakul	Maternal Grandfather: Lord (Phraya) Dhammasarnniti Vichitbakdi	Maternal Great-grandfather: unknown
Princess Hemvadi	Mother: Chao Chom Manda Ham Amatayakul	Maternal Grandfather: Lord (Phraya) Dhammasarnniti Vichitbakdi	Maternal Great-grandmother: unknown
Princess Hemvadi	Mother: Chao Chom Manda Ham Amatayakul	Maternal Grandmother: Saeng Amatayakul	Maternal Great-grandfather: unknown
Princess Hemvadi	Mother: Chao Chom Manda Ham Amatayakul	Maternal Grandmother: Saeng Amatayakul	Maternal Great-grandmother: unknown
