= Rosa 'Queen Sirikit' =

Yellow hybrid tea rose cultivar

- Genus: Rosa
- Hybrid parentage: 'Königin der Rosen' × 'Golden Giant Rose'
- Cultivar group: Hybrid tea
- Cultivar: 'Queen Sirikit'
- Breeder: Andre Hendricx
- Origin: France, 1968

Rosa 'Queen Sirikit' is a yellow Hybrid tea rose developed by French rose breeder, and Director of "Grandes Roseraiea du Val de Loire", André Hendrickx. The cultivar was developed from a cross between orange Hybrid tea, 'Königin der Rosen' and yellow Hybrid tea, 'Golden Giant'. The new rose variety was introduced in France in 1968 by Grandes Roseraies du Val de la Loire. Two years later it won the First Prize in a rose competition in Belfast, Northern Ireland. Hendricx, asked permission from Queen Sirikit of Thailand to name the rose after her.

== Description ==
'Queen Sirikit' is a hybrid tea rose, with a double (17-25 petals) bloom form. Flowers are a bright yellow colour that turns to orange-yellow and has a hint of pink at the edges. Flower size is ranges from 5 to 10 cm. The rose blooms year round. The plant has dark green, very glossy foliage and a mild fragrance.

== History ==
French rose breeder, André Hendrickx developed 'Queen Sirikit' from a cross between orange Hybrid tea, 'Königin der Rosen' and yellow Hybrid tea, 'Golden Giant'. The new rose variety was introduced in France in 1968 by Grandes Roseraies du Val de la Loire. Two years later it won the First Prize in a rose competition in Belfast, Northern Ireland. Hendricx, Director of "Grandes Roseraiea du Val de Loire", asked permission from Queen Sirikit of Thailand to name the rose after her.
