= Bua Kitiyakara =

Thai actress

Mom Luang Bua Kitiyakara
- บัว กิติยากร
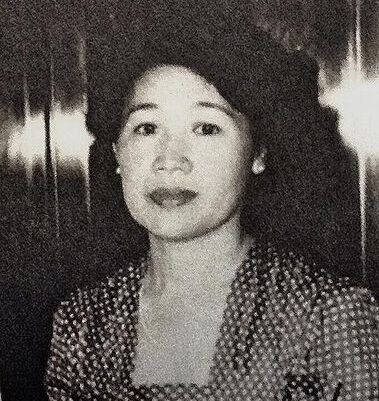
- Mom Luang Bua Kitiyakara in 1949
- Born: Mom Luang Bua (Note: At that time, Thais did not have surnames.); 25 November 1909; Bangkok, Siam
- Died: 19 September 1999 (aged 89); Bangkok, Thailand
- Other names: Prathum Chitchuea (ประทุม ชิดเชื้อ)
- Spouse: Nakkhatra Mangala, Prince of Chanthaburi II (m. 1928; died 1953)
- Children: Kalyanakit Kitiyakara; Adulakit Kitiyakara; Queen Sirikit; Busba Sathanapong

Mom Luang Bua Kitiyakara (Thai: บัว กิติยากร; RTGS: Bua Kitiyakon; 25 November 1909 – 19 September 1999), née Mom Luang Bua Snidvongs (Thai: บัว สนิทวงศ์; RTGS: Bua Sanitwong), stage-named Prathum Chitchuea (Thai: ประทุม ชิดเชื้อ), was a Thai actress. She was the wife of Prince Nakkhatra Mangala, the mother of Queen Sirikit, and the maternal grandmother of King Vajiralongkorn.

== Life ==
Mom Luang Bua (lit. 'lotus') was the eldest child of Mom Rajawongse Sathan Snidvongs or Chaophraya Wongsanupraphat and his wife Bang Snidvongs na Ayudhya or Thao Wanida Phicharini. She has three full siblings, Mom Luang Sa-ngop Snidvongs, Mom Luang Chinda Snidvongs and Thanphuying Maniratana Bunnag.

She attended Saipanya School and Wattana Wittaya Academy. In 1928 Bua entered the service of Queen Rambhai Barni as a lady-in-waiting. In 1929 she played Nang Phrai Nam, on the film Waen Wiset. She served as a royal courtier and was active in charities until withdrawing from the social scene in the 1950s.

== Marriage ==
In 1928 she married Nakkhatra Mangala, Prince of Chanthaburi II, a Thai royal diplomat and have the following children:

1. Mom Rajawongse Kalyanakit Kitiyakara (20 September 1929 – 15 May 1987) married Arun Snidvongs na Ayudhya.
2. Mom Rajawongse Adulakit Kitiyakara (2 November 1930 – 5 May 2004) married Princess Bandhusavali Yugala.
3. Queen Sirikit (12 August 1932 – 24 October 2025) married King Bhumibol Adulyadej.
4. Thanphuying Busba Sathanaphong (2 August 1934) married Mom Luang Thawisan Ladawan, but they divorced. Busba married Surayudh Sathanaphong.

== Death ==
Bua died in Siriraj Hospital in Bangkok on 19 September 1999, at the age of 89.

== Issue ==
Name	Birth	Death	Marriage	Their Children
Kalyanakit Kitiyakara	20 September 1929	15 May 1987	Arun Snidvongs na Ayudhya	Phlaichumphon Kitiyakara; Sirina Chittalan
Adulakit Kitiyakara	2 November 1930	5 May 2004	Princess Bandhusavali Yugala	Princess Soamsawali; Sarali Kitiyakara
Queen Sirikit	12 August 1932	24 October 2025	King Bhumibol Adulyadej	Princess Ubol Ratana; King Vajiralongkorn; Princess Sirindhorn; Princess Chulabhorn
Busba Sathanapong	2 August 1934		Thawisan Ladawan	Suthawan Sathirathai
Busba Sathanapong	2 August 1934		Surayudh Sathanapong	No children

== Honours ==
- Dame Grand Cross (First Class) of the Most Illustrious Order of Chula Chom Klao (1950)
- Dame Grand Cordon (Special Class) of the Most Exalted Order of the White Elephant (1991)
- Dame Grand Cordon (Special Class) of the Most Noble Order of the Crown of Thailand (1996)
- Royal Cypher Medal of King Rama VII, 4th Class (1927)
- Royal Cypher Medal of King Rama IX, 1st Class (1953)

== Ancestry ==
Ancestors of Bua Kitiyakara

16. Rama II
8. Nuam, Prince Wongsa Dhiraj Snid
17. Prang na Bang Xang
4. Prince Sai Snidvongs
18. (= 28.) Duang na Bang Xang
9. Yaem na Bang Xang
2. Sathan Snidvongs, Chao Phraya Wongsanupraphat
5. Khian Sasisamit
1. Bua Kitiyakara
6. Ruai Bunyathon
3. Bang Snidvongs na Ayudhya, Thao Wanida Phicharini
28. (=18.) Duang na Bang Xang
14. That na Bang Xang
7. Wae na Bang Xang
