= Busba Sathanapong =

Thai nobility

Than Phu Ying Busba Sathanapong
- บุษบา สธนพงศ์
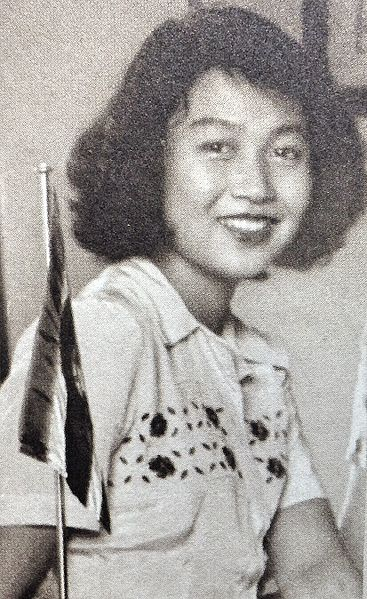
- Born: Mom Rajawongse Busba Kitiyakara; 2 August 1934 (age 91); Washington D.C., United States
- Spouses: Thawisan Ladawan (div.); Surayud Sathanapong
- Children: Suthawan Sathirathai
- Parents: Nakkhatra Mangala Kitiyakara (father); Bua Kitiyakara (mother)

Than Phu Ying Busba Kitiyakara Sathanapong (Thai: บุษบา กิติยากร สธนพงศ์; RTGS: Butsaba Kitiyakon Sathanaphong, born 2 August 1934) is the daughter of Mom Chao Nakkhatra Mangala Kitiyakara and younger sister of Thailand's Queen Mother Sirikit Kitiyakara.

== Early life and education ==
Like her elder sister Sirikit, Busba was educated at Rajini School and St. Francis Xavier Convent. During her childhood, her father was appointed Thai Ambassador to France, Denmark and the United Kingdom, and Busba continued her education in these countries with her sister, Sirikit. After Sirikit's marriage to King Bhumibol in 1950, Busba became a palace fixture.

== Family ==
Busba married Thawisan Ladawan in 1958 and had a daughter, Suthawan Ladawan Sathirathai on 24 September 1958. They divorced soon afterwards.

She later married Captain Surayud Sathanapong.

== Honours ==
- Dame Grand Cross (First Class) of the Most Noble Order of the Crown of Thailand (2003)
- Dame Grand Commander (Second Class, upper grade) of the Most Illustrious Order of Chula Chom Klao (1982)
- Dame Commander (Second Class) of the Most Exalted Order of the White Elephant (1979)
- Royal Cypher Medal of King Rama IX, Second Class (1993)

== Ancestry ==
Ancestors of Busba Sathanapong

16. (=20) Mongkut
8. Chulalongkorn
17. Debsirindra
4. Kitiyakara Voralaksana, Prince of Chanthaburi I
18. Yim Bisalayabutra
9. Uam Bisalayabutra
19. Prang Sombatsiri
2. Nakkhatra Mangkala, Prince of Chanthaburi II
20. (=16) Mongkut
10. Devan Uthaivongse, Prince Devavongse Varoprakarn
21. Piam Sucharitakul
5. Princess Apsarasaman Devakula
22. Hong Sucharitakul
11. Yai Sucharitakul
23. Tat
1. Busba Kitiyakara
24. Nuam, Prince Vongsadhirajasanid
12. Prince Sai Sanidvongs
25. Yaem Na Bangxang
6. Sadan Snidvongs
13. Khian Sasisamit
3. Bua Snidvongs
14. Ruai Bunyathon
7. Bang Bunyathon
30. That Na Bangxang
15. Wae Na Bangxang
