= Nakkhatra Mangala =

- Prince of Chanthaburi II
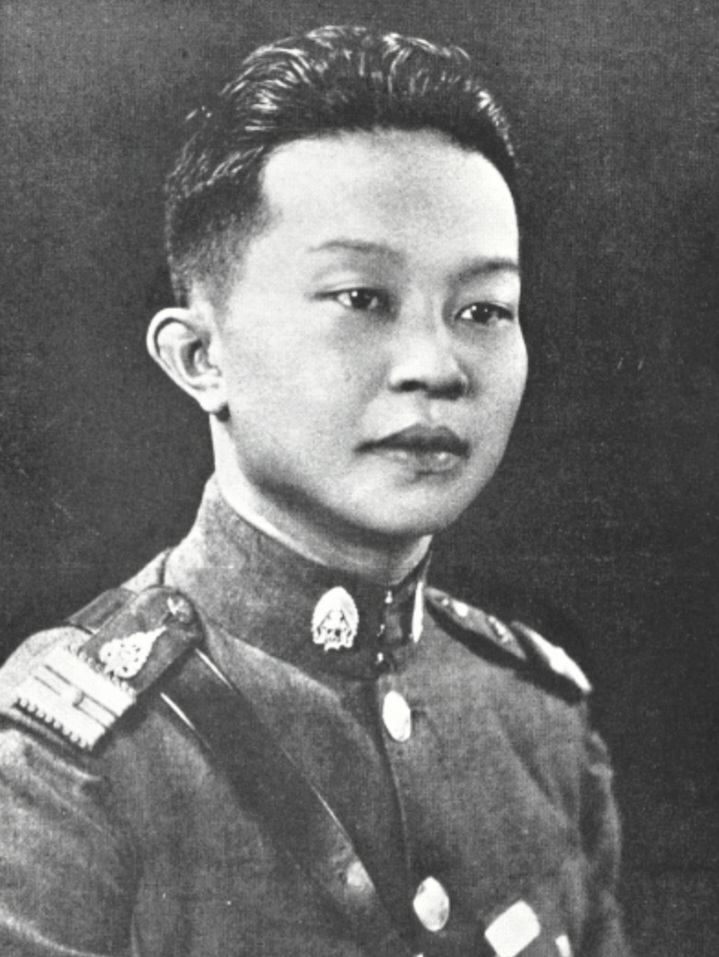
- Born: Nakkhatra Mangala; 4 January 1898; Bangkok, Siam
- Died: 11 February 1953 (aged 55); Bangkok, Thailand
- Spouse: Bua Snidvongs
- Issue: Kalyanakit Kitiyakara; Adulakit Kitiyakara; Queen Sirikit; Busba Sathanapong
- House: Kitiyakara family (Chakri Dynasty)
- Father: Kitiyakara Voralaksana, Prince of Chanthaburi I
- Mother: Princess Apsarasaman Devakula

Prince Nakkhatra Mangala, 2nd Prince of Chanthaburi (Note: Thai: พระวรวงศ์เธอ พระองค์เจ้านักขัตรมงคล กรมหมื่นจันทบุรีสุรนาถ; RTGS: Nakkhattramongkhon) (4 January 1898 – 11 February 1953) was the eldest son of Prince Kitiyakara Voralaksana, the 1st Prince of Chanthaburi and Princess Apsarasaman Kitiyakara. He was the father of Queen Sirikit, father in-law of late Thai king King Bhumibol Adulyadej and maternal grandfather of the current King Vajiralongkorn. His birth name was His Serene Highness Prince Nakkhatra Mangala Kitiyakara, and his style and title was His Highness Prince Nakkhatra Mangala since 1950 when his daughter became queen.

== Education ==
Prince Nakkhatra Mangala received primary education at the royal palace, then studied at the King's College under the royal patronage. Until 1910, he studied at the Royal Thai Army Cadet Academy.

In 1911, he went to study in England being a student under the Ministry of Defence in 1914, attending high school in France until receiving the Baccalauréat certificate in both areas in science. He then attended the French cadet academy École spéciale militaire de Saint-Cyr where he received the ranks of lieutenant and sergeant in the French army.

== Careers ==
In 1920 he completed his studies in France. King Rama VI bestowed a second lieutenant on July 29, 1920, as a king guard under the 1st Infantry Regiment. Later, on January 27, 1922, King Rama VI bestowed the rank of lieutenant while studying military school in France. He also served in several French infantry regiments.

On June 29, 1931, he was graciously pleased to hold a position Assistant Chief of Staff for the Royal Thai Army.

In 1932, he retired from military officer then moved to serve in the Ministry of Foreign Affairs in the position of first secretary position at the Royal Thai Embassy Washington two years later he resigned from his post and returned to Thailand. During this time, He studied various academic fields such as history, astrology and literature.

Prince Nakkhatra Mangala represented the Ministry of Foreign Affairs as the ambassador of the kingdom of Thailand to the Court of St James's in the United Kingdom, and to the government of France. He was the one who made his daughter, Mom Rajawongse Sirikit Kitiyakara fall in love with King Bhumibol Adulyadej by sending his daughter to help take care of the king when he was car accident in Switzerland in 1950.

After he arranges for his daughter to be married with King Bhumibol Adulyadej, he was appointed as member of The Privy Council in Rama IX reign and promoted to rank General in Royal Thai Army.

== Issue ==
Prince Nakkhatra Mangala was married to Mom Luang Bua Snidvongs. There are 4 children as follows: Kalyanakit Kitiyakara, Adulakit Kitiyakara, Sirikit Kitiyakara and Busba Kitiyakara. Prince Nakkhatra Mangala was a key person who pushed the Kitiyakara family into being part of royal bloodline, the Mahidol family.

== Death ==
He became ill with bronchitis in mid-January 1953 and on February 11, 1953, at 7.45 a.m., he died at the royal palace at the age of 55 years 1 month 8 days.

== Title, style, and honours ==
- 4 January 1899 – 5 June 1929 : His Serene Highness Prince Nakkhatra Mangala
  - (Thai: หม่อมเจ้านักขัตรมงคล; Mom Chao Nakkhatra Mangala)
- 5 June 1929 – 8 May 1950 : His Serene Highness Prince Nakkhatra Mangala Kitiyakara
  - (Thai: หม่อมเจ้านักขัตรมงคล กิติยากร; Mom Chao Nakkhatra Mangala Kitiyakara)
- 8 May 1950 – 5 May 1952 : His Highness Prince Nakkhatra Mangala
  - (Thai: พระวรวงศ์เธอ พระองค์เจ้านักขัตรมงคล; Phra Worawong Thoe Phra Ong Chao Nakkhatra Mangala)
- 5 May 1952 – 11 February 1953 : His Highness Prince Nakkhatra Mangala, the Prince of Chanthaburi
  - (Thai: พระวรวงศ์เธอ กรมหมื่นจันทบุรีสุรนาถ; Phra Worawong Thoe Krom Muen Chanthaburi Suranath)

=== Thai honours ===
- Knight of the Most Illustrious Order of the Royal House of Chakri (1952)
- Knight Grand Cross (First Class) of the Most Illustrious Order of Chula Chom Klao (1950)
- Knight Grand Cordon (Special Class) of the Most Exalted Order of the White Elephant (1952)
- Knight Grand Cross (First Class) of the Most Noble Order of the Crown of Thailand (1950)
- Dushdi Mala Medal For Arts (1927)
- King Rama VII Royal Cypher Medal, 3rd Class (1926)
- King Rama IX Royal Cypher Medal, 1st Class (1953)
- Prabas Mala Medal (1897)
- Dvidha Bhisek Medal (1903)
- Rajamangala Medal (1907)
- Rajamangala Bhisek Medal (1908)
- King Rama VI Coronation Medal (1911)
- King Rama VII Coronation Medal (1925)
- King Rama IX Coronation Medal (1950)

=== Foreign honours ===
- Denmark:
  - Grand Cross of the Order of the Dannebrog (1950)
- France:
  - Officer of the National Order of the Legion of Honour (1928)

== Notes ==
Nakkhatra Mangala House of Kitiyakara Cadet branch of the House of Chakri Born: 4 January 1898 Died: 11 February 1953
Diplomatic posts
Preceded by Phra Manuwetwimonnak	Thai Minister to the United Kingdom; 1946–1947	Succeeded by Direk Jayanama
Preceded by Phra Manuwetwimonnak	Thai Minister to Denmark; 1947	Succeeded by Phra Phahitthanukorn
Preceded by Phra Phahitthanukorn	Thai Minister to France; 1947–1948	Succeeded by Wisut Atthayukti
Preceded by Direk Jayanama	Thai Ambassador to the United Kingdom; 1948–1950	Succeeded by Phra Phahitthanukorn
