= Kalyanakit Kitiyakara =

Thai noble and brother of Queen Sirikit

Mom Rajawongse Kalyanakit Kitiyakara
- กัลยาณกิติ์ กิติยากร
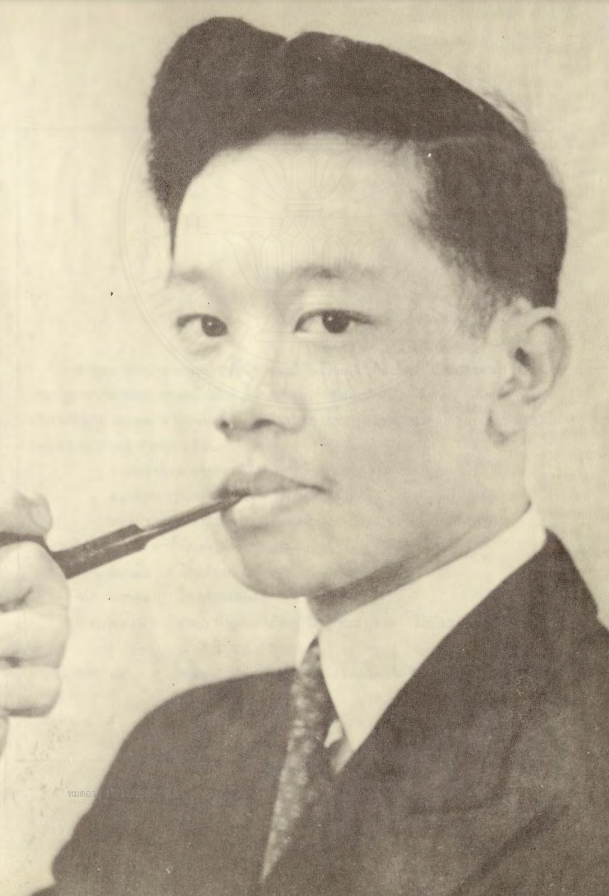
- Born: 20 September 1929; Bangkok, Siam
- Died: 15 May 1987 (aged 57); Ramathibodi Hospital, Bangkok, Thailand
- Spouse: Arun Snidvongs na Ayudhya
- Children: 2
- Parents: Nakkhatra Mangala, Prince of Chantaburi II (father); Bua Kitiyakara (mother)

Mom Rajawongse Kalyanakit Kitiyakara (Thai: กัลยาณกิติ์ กิติยากร; RTGS: Kanlayanakit Kitiyakon; 1929–1987) was a Thai cardiothoracic surgeon who trained in England and the United States. He was born in Bangkok to Nakkhatra Mangala, Prince of Chantaburi II and Bua Kitiyakara. He was the eldest brother of Sirikit, Queen of Thailand.

== Biography ==
Kitiyakara began his training at Guy's Hospital Medical School in London, qualifying in 1956. He moved to the United States for further training and then returned to Thailand, becoming consultant cardiothoracic surgeon at the Siriraj Hospital Medical School in Bangkok.

In 1957 he married Arun Snidvongs na Ayudhya and had two children.

- Mom Luang Blaijumbol Kitiyakara, married Aphinya Kitiyakara na Ayudhya (née Suvarvihok)
- Mom Luang Sirina Jittalan, married Piya Jittalan and had 1 daughter
  - Tara Jittalan

In 1987 he died aged 57 at Ramathibodi Hospital.

== Professional qualifications ==
- Membership of the Royal College of Surgeons 1956
- Fellowship of the Royal College of Surgeons by election 1981
- Bachelor of Medicine, Bachelor of Surgery London 1957
- Licentiate of the Royal College of Physicians 1956

== Honours ==
- Knight Grand Cordon (Special Class) of the Most Noble Order of the Crown of Thailand (1987)
- Knight Grand Cross (First Class) of the Most Exalted Order of the White Elephant (1985)
- Knight Grand Commander (Second Class, upper grade) of the Most Illustrious Order of Chula Chom Klao (1976)
- Dushdi Mala Medal, for medicine (1987)
- Chakrabarti Mala Medal (1986)
- King Rama IX Royal Cypher Medal, 3rd Class (1953)
- King Rama IX Royal Court Medal (1975)

== Ancestry ==
Ancestors of Kalyanakit Kitiyakara

16. (=20) King Mongkut, Rama IV
8. King Chulalongkorn, Rama V
17. Queen Debsirindra
4. Kitiyakara Voralaksana, Prince of Chanthaburi I
18. Yim Bisalayabutra
9. Uam Bisalayabutra (1856—1891)
19. Prang Sombatsiri
2. Nakkhatra Mangkala Kitiyakara, Prince of Chanthaburi II
20. (=16) King Mongkut, Rama IV
10. Devan Uthaivongse, the Prince Devavongse Varoprakarn
21. Piam Sucharitakul
5. Princess Absornsaman Devakula (1877—1939)
22. Hongse Sucharitakul
11. Yai Sucharitakul (1858—1936)
23. Taad Dhammasaroj-Indravimala
1. Kalyanakit Kitiyakara
24. Navama, the Prince Vongsadhirajasanid (1808一1871)
12. Prince Sai Sanidvongs (1845—1912)
6. Sadan Sanidvongs (1866—1940)
13. Khian Sasisamit
3. Bua Sanidvongs (1909—1999)
7. Bang Sucharitakul (1886—1970)
