= Sirikit =

Queen of Thailand from 1950 to 2016

- Queen Mother of Thailand
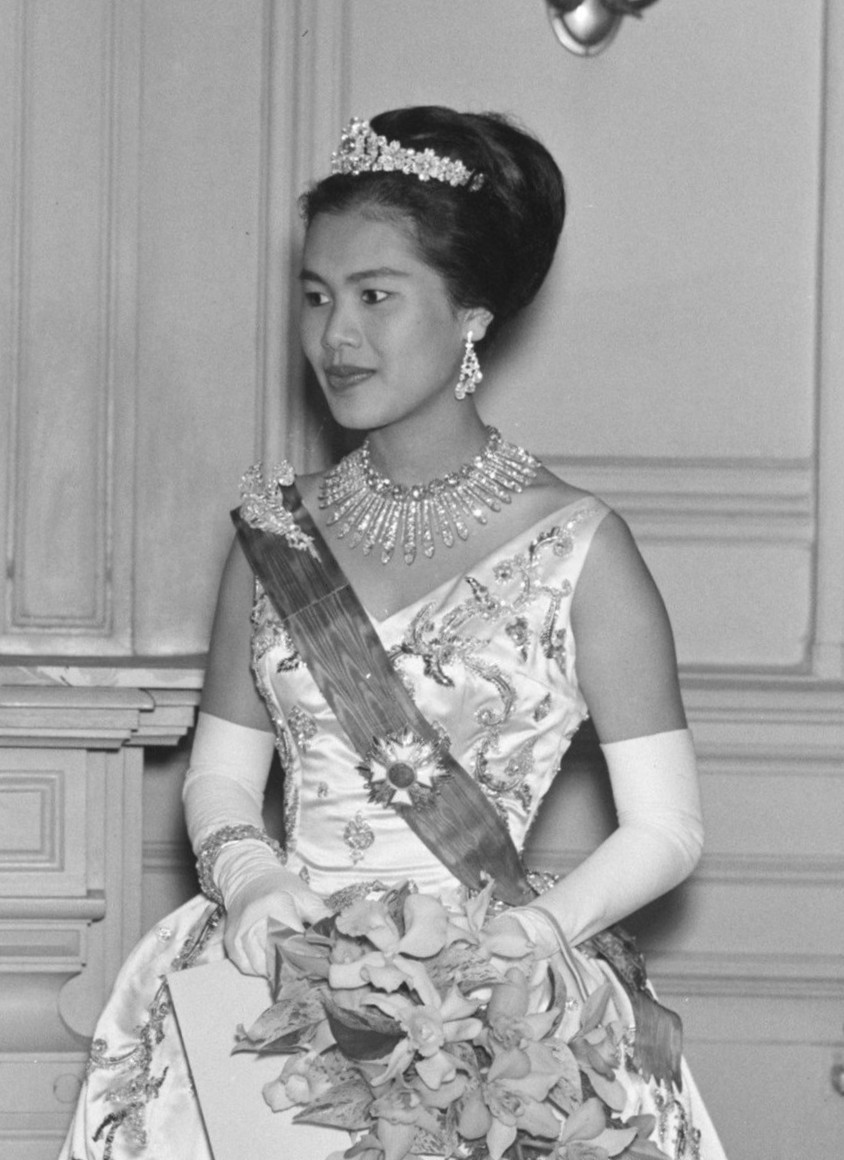
- Official portrait, c. 1960

Queen consort of Thailand
- Tenure: 28 April 1950 – 13 October 2016
- Coronation: 5 May 1950

Queen regent of Thailand
- Regency: 22 October 1956 – 5 November 1956
- Monarch: Bhumibol Adulyadej (Rama IX)
- Born: Sirikit Kitiyakara; 12 August 1932; Bangkok, Siam
- Died: 24 October 2025 (aged 93); Bangkok, Thailand
- Spouse: Bhumibol Adulyadej (Rama IX) (m. 1950; died 2016)
- Issue Detail: Princess Ubol Ratana; Vajiralongkorn (Rama X); Sirindhorn, Princess Royal; Chulabhorn, Princess Srisavangavadhana
- House: Kitiyakara (by birth); Mahidol (by marriage)
- Dynasty: Chakri
- Father: Nakkhatra Mangala
- Mother: Bua Snidvongs
- Religion: Theravada Buddhism

Sirikit (Note: Thai: สิริกิติ์, pronounced [sì.rì.kìt].) (born Mom Rajawongse Sirikit Kitiyakara; (Note: Thai: หม่อมราชวงศ์สิริกิติ์ กิติยากร; RTGS: Mom Ratchawong Sirikit Kitiyakon.) 12 August 1932 – 24 October 2025) was Queen of Thailand from 28 April 1950 to 13 October 2016 as the wife of King Bhumibol Adulyadej (Rama IX), her first cousin once removed.

Sirikit met Bhumibol in Paris where her father served as the Thai ambassador to France. They married in 1950, shortly before Bhumibol's coronation. In 1956, she was appointed queen regent during the King's temporary ordination as a Buddhist monk. The royal couple had four children: Ubol Ratana, Vajiralongkorn (Rama X), Sirindhorn, and Chulabhorn. As consort to the monarch who became one of the world's longest-reigning heads of state, she held the distinction of being the world's longest-serving queen consort.

Sirikit suffered a stroke in 2012 and subsequently withdrew from public life. She died on 24 October 2025 at the age of 93.

== Early life and family ==
Sirikit Kitiyakara was born on 12 August 1932, at the home of Lord Vongsanuprabhand, her maternal grandfather. She was the eldest daughter and the third child of Prince Nakkhatra Mangkala Kitiyakara, the son of Prince Kitiyakara Voralaksana, and Mom Luang Bua Snidvongs (1909–1999). Her name, which was given by Queen Rambai Barni, means "the greatness of Kitiyakara".

She had three siblings, two elder brothers and a younger sister:

- Mom Rajawongse Kalyanakit Kitiyakara, (20 September 1929 – 15 May 1987)
- Mom Rajawongse Adulakit Kitiyakara (2 November 1930 – 5 May 2004)
- Than Phu Ying Busba Kitiyakara (born 2 August 1934)

Sirikit was raised by her maternal grandparents for a year after her birth, since her father was in the United States to work as the Secretary of the Siamese Legation at Washington D.C. Her mother joined her husband three months later. When she was one year old, her parents returned to Thailand. Sirikit lived together with her family in Deves Palace, near the Chao Phraya River in Bangkok.

As a child, Sirikit often visited her paternal grandmother. Once in 1933, she travelled with Princess Absornsaman Devakula following King Prajadhipok's tour in Songkhla.

== Life ==
=== Education ===
At age four, Sirikit attended the Kindergarten at Rajini School (Queen's College in English), where she studied at the primary level. During that time the Pacific War was being fought. Bangkok was bombed many times, especially the rail lines, making travel unsafe. She therefore moved to Saint Francis Xavier Convent School, since it was near the palace. She studied at Saint Francis Xavier from her second primary year through the early secondary level.

In 1946, with the war over, her father moved to the United Kingdom as the ambassador to the Court of St James's, taking his family with him. Sirikit was then 13 and completed her secondary education. While in England she learned to play the piano and became fluent in English and French. Because of her father's work as a diplomat, the family moved to other countries, including Denmark and France. While in France, she studied at a music academy in Paris.

Also in France, Sirikit met Bhumibol Adulyadej, who was related to her, since both were descendants of King Chulalongkorn (Rama V). At that time, Bhumibol had ascended to the throne and was studying in Switzerland. Bhumibol and Sirikit (as well as a few other students) were staying at the Royal Thai Embassy in Paris. Sirikit accompanied the king as he visited various tourist attractions, and they found that they had much in common.

=== Marriage ===
On 4 October 1948, while Bhumibol was driving a Fiat Topolino on the Geneva–Lausanne highway, he collided with the rear of a braking truck 10 km outside of Lausanne. He injured his back and incurred cuts on his face that cost him most of the sight in one eye. He subsequently wore an ocular prosthetic. While he was hospitalised in Lausanne, Sirikit visited him frequently. She met his mother, The Princess Mother Sangwan, who asked her to continue her studies nearby so that the king could get to know her better. Bhumibol selected a boarding school for her in Lausanne, Riante Rive. A quiet engagement in Lausanne followed on 19 July 1949, and the couple married on 28 April 1950, just a week before his coronation.

The marriage took place at Srapathum Palace. Queen Sri Savarindira, the Queen Grandmother presided over the marriage ceremony. Both the king and Sirikit signed on line 11 of their certificate of marriage. As she was not yet 18, her parents also signed, on line 12 directly under her signature. She later received the Order of the Royal House of Chakri, and became queen. After the coronation ceremony on 5 May 1950, both went back to Switzerland to continue their studies, and returned to Bangkok in 1952.

=== Regency ===
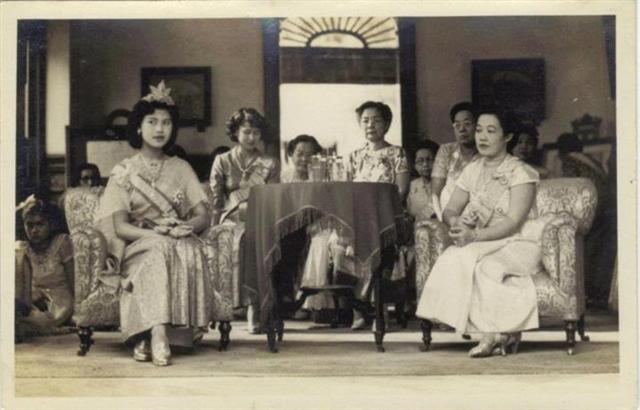
Queen Sirikit (Far left), Princess Galyani Vadhana (center), Princess Hemvadi, Princess Adisaya Suriyabha, Princess Adorn Dibyanibha and Queen Rambhai Barni (right) in 1950

When the king undertook the traditional period as a Buddhist monk in 1956, Queen Sirikit acted as regent.

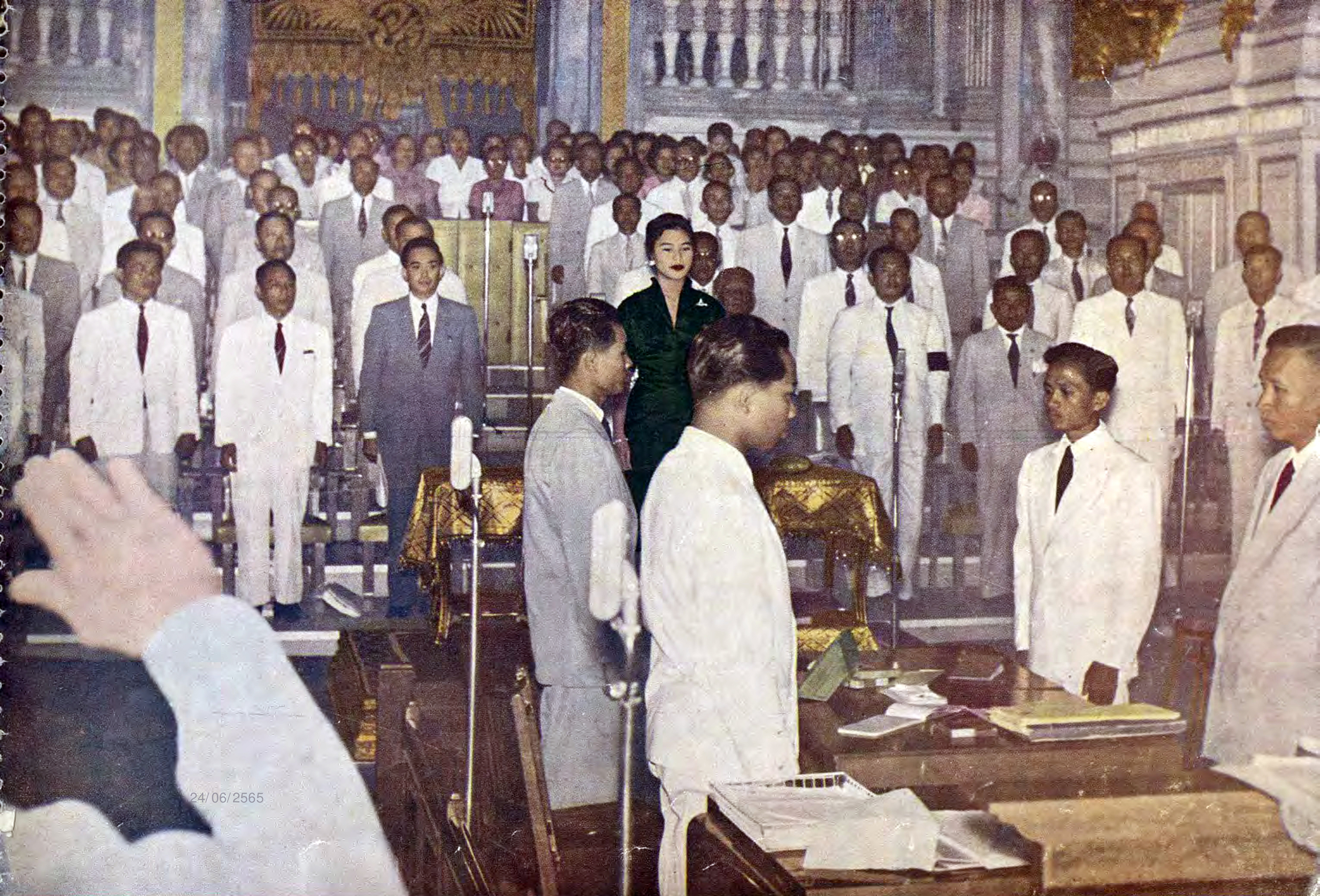
Queen Sirikit taking an oath of office at the Ananta Samakhom Throne Hall on 20 September 1956

She took an oath of office amongst the House of Representatives convened at the Ananta Samakhom Throne Hall on 20 September 1956 when she was appointed regent by her husband.

She performed her duties so well that she was officially named the Regent of Thailand and the King gave her the title 'Somdet Phra Nang Chao Sirikit Phra Borommarachininat' on his birthday, 5 December 1956. She became the second Siamese queen regent in Thai history. The first was Queen Saovabha Phongsri of Siam, who served as regent when her husband King Chulalongkorn travelled to Europe, and later became Queen Sri Patcharindra.

=== Issue ===
Sirikit and Bhumibol had four children, thirteen grandchildren, and nine great-grandchildren.

=== Health issues and death ===
Bureau of the Royal Household announcement of Queen Sirikit's death, 24 October 2025

At dawn on 21 July 2012, Sirikit felt unsteady and staggered while exercising at Siriraj Hospital, where her husband resided. After performing magnetic resonance imaging, a team of physicians determined that she had suffered an ischemic stroke. She refrained from further public appearances due to her treatment, including the grand audience granted by her husband on his 85th birthday from the Ananta Samakhom Hall on 5 December 2012.

On 29 November 2016, the palace announced that the queen had been discharged from the hospital and returned to the Chitralada Royal Villa for recovery.

Sirikit died at the King Chulalongkorn Memorial Hospital at 21:21 ICT (14:21 UTC) on 24 October 2025, at the age of 93. The Thai Royal Household Bureau reported that she had died due to complications from a blood infection after being hospitalized since 17 October. A year-long mourning period for government officials, as well as a 90-day mourning period for the general public, in her memory was declared by her son, King Vajiralongkorn, and Thai prime minister Anutin Charnvirakul. Flags in Thailand were also ordered to fly at half-mast for 30 days. Her remains were laid in state in the Dusit Maha Prasat Throne Hall of the Grand Palace in a royal coffin similar to that of her husband's beginning on Sunday, 26 October.

== Cultural status ==
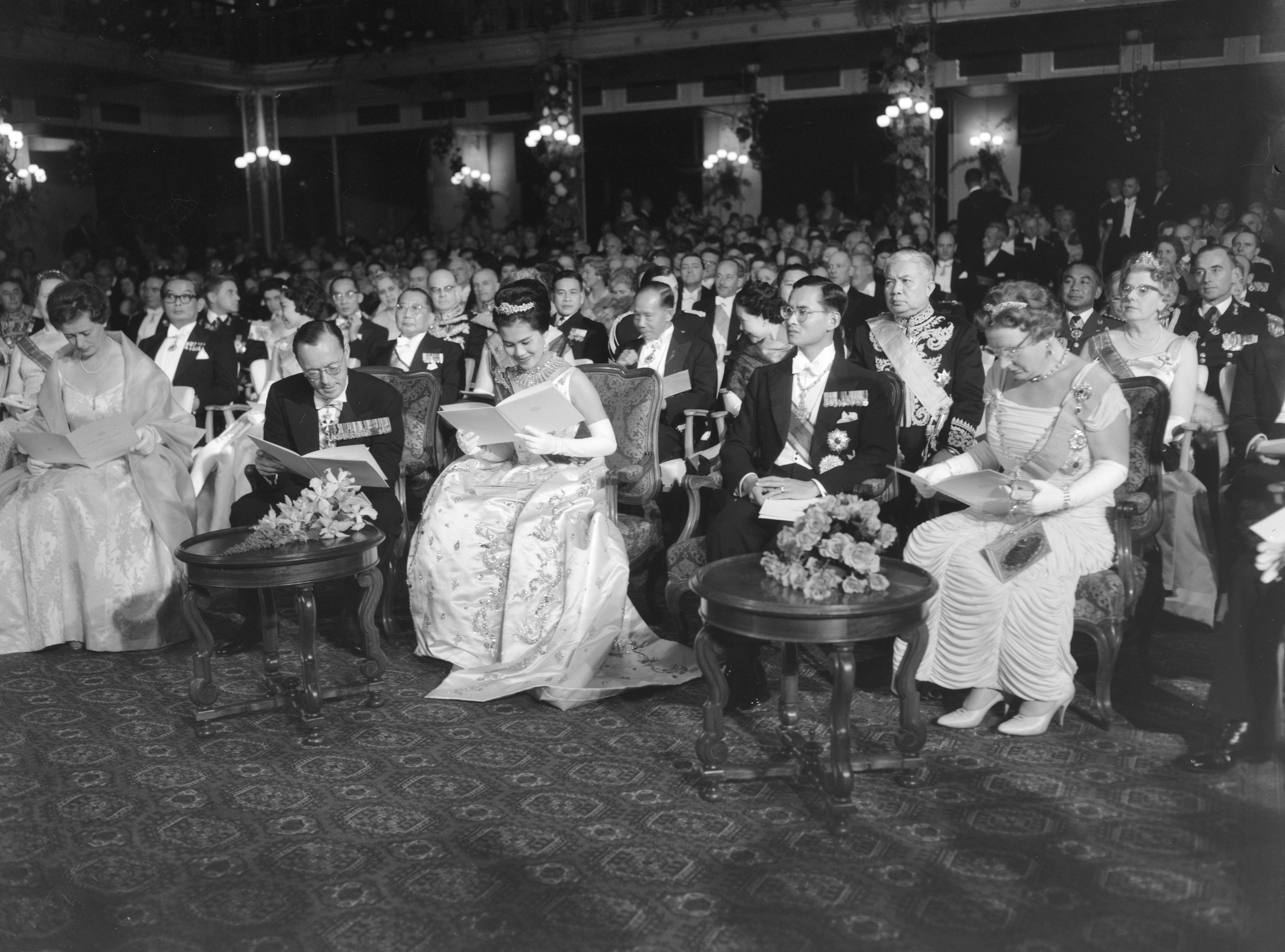
Queen Sirikit and King Bhumibol with Queen Juliana and Prince Bernhard in the Netherlands, 1960.

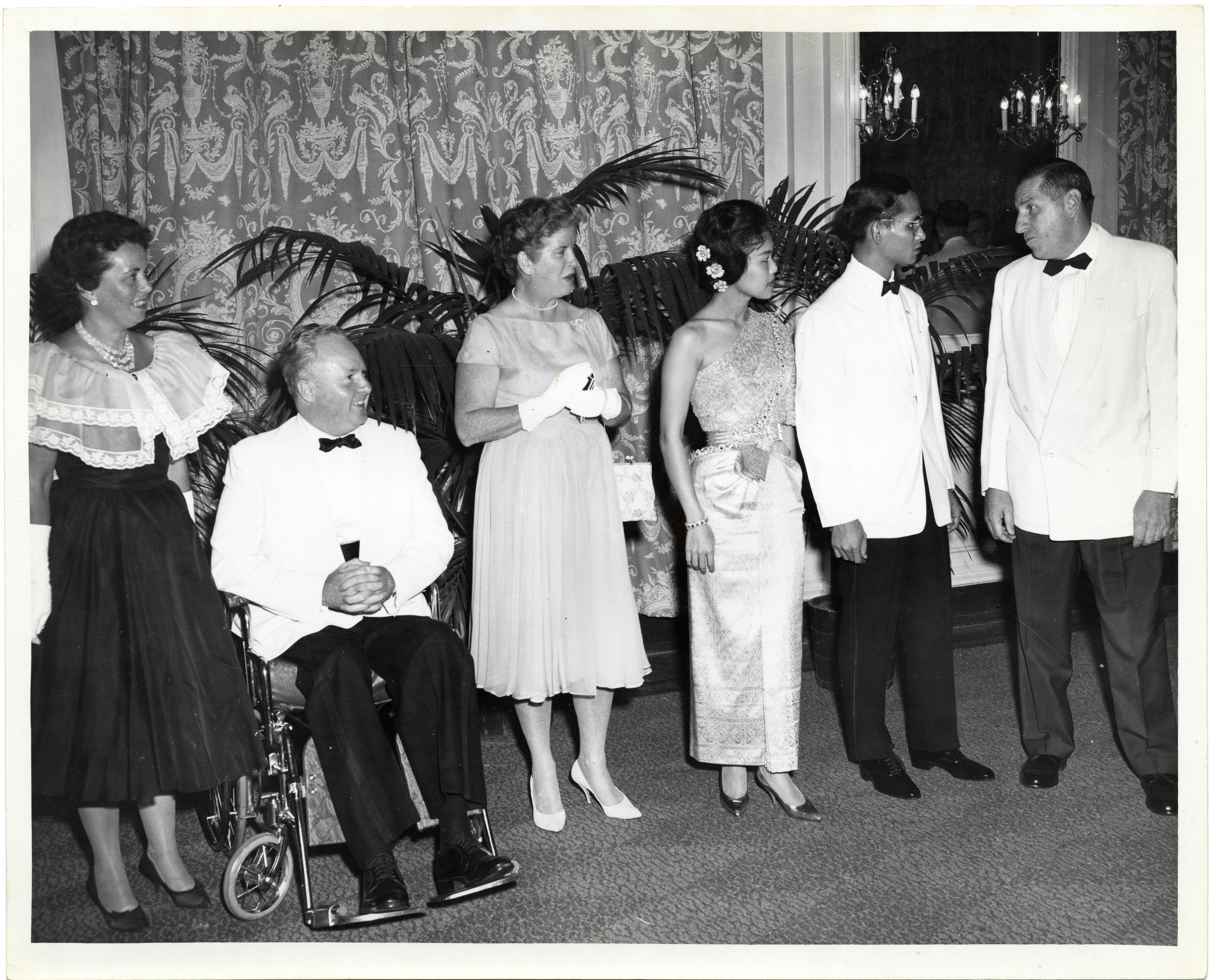
Queen Sirikit and King Bhumibol during the official visit to the United States, 1960.

International media coverage of Sirikit's overseas tours in the 1960s frequently noted her clothing and style. Time reported in 1962 that she was again placed on the world's best-dressed women list. Vanity Fair later listed her in the International Best Dressed Hall of Fame List (1965). In 2025, Town & Country described her as a glamorous fashion icon of the 1950s and 1960s and noted her frequent appearances on international best-dressed lists. She collaborated with French couturier Pierre Balmain on outfits made from Thai silk, adding that her promotion of traditional weaving was credited with supporting Thailand's silk industry.

Sirikit's birthday, like King Bhumibol's, is a national holiday, and is also Mother's Day in Thailand. She was particularly revered in the more remote and traditional parts of the country, where the monarchy is regarded as semi-divine. Her work in promoting tolerance and understanding for the Muslim minorities in the southernmost provinces of Pattani, Yala, and Narathiwat made her especially popular amongst Thai Muslims. The queen had a strong bond with southern Thailand, and she formerly spent months in the Muslim-majority provinces every year.

== Books and writing ==
Queen Sirikit published In Memory of my European Trip in 1964, which described her time in Europe with the king. She also composed songs for performance by The Handsome Band, the band of the palace.

The songs she composed were:

- Chao Chom Khwan (เจ้าจอมขวัญ)
- That Thoe (ทาสเธอ)
- Sai Yut (สายหยุด)
- Nang Yaem (นางแย้ม)

== Honours and awards ==
Styles of: Queen Sirikit; The Queen Mother
- Reference style: Her Majesty
- Spoken style: Your Majesty

Royal monogram of Queen Sirikit

Royal standard of Queen Sirikit, with her cypher on a light blue background (the color of the day of her birthday), often flown in August (near her birthday and Mothers' Day).

In 1976, the Thai government honoured the queen by declaring her birthday on 12 August a national holiday.

=== Ranks ===
- Volunteer Defence Corps General

=== Foreign honours ===
- Austria: Grand Cross, Special Class of the Order of Honour for Services to the Republic of Austria
- Belgium: Dame Grand Cross of the Order of Leopold I
- Brunei: Dame of the Most Esteemed Family Order of Laila Utama
- Chile: Dame Grand Cross of the Order of Merit
- Denmark: Knight of the Order of the Elephant
- (Ethiopian Empire) Ethiopian Imperial Family: Dame Grand Cordon with Collar of the Imperial Order of the Queen of Sheba
- Egypt: Supreme Class of the Order of the Virtues
- Germany: Grand Cross, Special Class of the Order of Merit of the Federal Republic of Germany
- (Kingdom of Greece) Greek Royal Family: Dame Grand Cross of the Royal Order of Beneficence
- Indonesia: Star of Mahaputera, 1st Class
- (Pahlavi Iran) Iranian Imperial Family: Dame Grand Cordon, Special Class of the Imperial Order of the Pleiades
- Italy: Grand Cross of the Order of Merit of the Italian Republic
- Japan: Dame Grand Cordon of the Order of the Precious Crown
- Laos
  - (Kingdom of Laos) Lao Royal Family: Dame Grand Cordon of the Order of the Million Elephants and the White Parasol
  - Laos: Order of Phoxay Lane Xang
- Luxembourg: Dame of the Order of the Gold Lion of the House of Nassau
- Malaysia: Dame Grand Cordon of the Most Exalted Order of the Crown of the Realm
  - Selangor: First Class of the Most Esteemed Royal Family Order of Selangor
  - Terengganu: First Class of the Most Distinguished Family Order of Terengganu
  - Kelantan: Recipient of the Most Esteemed Royal Family Order of Kelantan
- Kingdom of Nepal: Member Grand Cross of the Order of Honour
- Netherlands: Dame Grand Cross of the Order of the Lion of the Netherlands
- Norway: Dame Grand Cross of the Royal Norwegian Order of Saint Olav
- Philippines: Grand Cross with Collar of the Order of the Golden Heart
- Portugal:
  - Grand Cross of the Military Order of Saint James of the Sword
  - Grand Cross of the Order of Prince Henry
- Romania: Grand Cross of the Order of the Star of Romania
- Spain:
  - Dame Grand Cross of the Royal and Distinguished Spanish Order of Charles III (13 November 1987)
  - Dame Grand Cross of the Royal Order of Isabella the Catholic (3 November 1960)
- Sweden: Member Grand Cross of the Royal Order of the Seraphim
- Taiwan: Grand Cross of the Order of Propitious Clouds (5 June 1963)

=== Eponyms ===
Queen Sirikit was well known for her charitable work. She was the honorary president of the Thai Red Cross Society, a post she had held since 1956. She gained new prominence in this role in the aftermath of the tsunami disaster in southern Thailand in December 2004. She was also active in relief work for the many refugees from Cambodia and Myanmar in Thailand.

Many things in Thailand have been named after the Queen:

- Queen Sirikit National Institute of Child Health, children's hospital
- Queen Sirikit Naval Hospital, Royal Thai Navy military hospital in Chonburi province
- Queen Sirikit Medical Center, Ramathibodi Hospital
- Queen Sirikit Centre for Breast Cancer, a new 10-storey hospital in Bangkok
- Queen Sirikit National Convention Center in Bangkok
  - Queen Sirikit National Convention Centre MRT station
- Queen Sirikit Park in Bangkok
- Sirikit Dam on the Nan River, Uttaradit Province
- Queen Sirikit Botanic Garden, Chiang Mai Province
- Queen Sirikit Arboretum Garden, Pathum Thani Province
- Queen Sirikit Cup, an annual Asian-Pacific golfing event
- Queen Sirikit Crab (Thaiphusa sirikit)
- Queen Sirikit Rose
- Queen's Cup, annual football competition
- Fort Sirikit, a military encampment, the headquarters of the Artillery Division of the Royal Thai Army.

The queen was also active in promoting Thai culture and history, mainly through her initiative in the making of the Thai movie The Legend of Suriyothai, one of the most lavish and expensive Thai movies ever made.

== Genealogical table ==
Relationship with Bhumibol Adulyadej and Sirikit

Savang Vadhana	Chulalongkorn (Rama V)	Uam Bisalayabutra
Apsarasaman Devakula	Kitiyakara Voralaksana
Srinagarindra	Mahidol Adulyadej	Bua Snidvongs	Nakkhatra Mangala
Bhumibol Adulyadej (Rama IX)	Sirikit

== See also ==
- List of covers of Time magazine (1960s)

== Notes ==
Sirikit House of Kitiyakara Cadet branch of the House of Chakri Born: 12 August 1932 Died: 24 October 2025
Thai royalty
Vacant Title last held by Rambai Barni	Queen consort of Thailand; 1950–2016	Vacant Title next held by Suthida Tidjai
Non-profit organization positions
Vacant Title last held by Savang Vadhana	President of Thai Red Cross Society; 1956–2025	Vacant Title next held by Queen Suthida
Honorary titles
Preceded by King Rama IX	Eldest Royal Member of the Chakri Dynasty; 2016–2025	Succeeded by Princess Ubolratana Rajakanya
