= List of luk khrueng people =

This article is a list of luk khrueng (Thai: ลูกครึ่ง), people of mixed European (or other race) and Thai origins.

== Academia, science and technology ==
- Robert Dirks (Thai mother, American father)
- Giles Ji Ungpakorn (Thai father, English mother)

== Entertainment and media ==
=== Film, actors and model ===
- Alex Rendell (Thai mother, English father)
- Amanda Obdam (Thai mother, Canadian father)
- Ananda Everingham (Lao mother, Australian father)
- Anchilee Scott-Kemmis (Thai mother, Australian father)
- Ann Thongprasom (Thai mother, Swedish father)
- Anntonia Porsild (Thai mother, Danish father)
- Araya A. Hargate (Thai mother, English father)
- Arayha Suparurk (Thai mother, Austrian father)
- Art Supawatt Purdy (Thai mother, American father)
- Ashly Burch (Thai mother, American father)
- Brenda Song (Thai mother, Hmong father)
- Carissa Springett (Thai mother, English father)
- Chai Hansen (Thai father, Australian mother)
- Charlie Trairat (Thai mother, Dutch father)
- Chrissy Teigen (Thai mother, American father)
- Cindy Bishop (Half English, one quarter Indian and one quarter Thai mother, American father)
- Colin Ryan (Thai mother, English father)
- Davika Hoorne (Thai mother, Belgian father)
- Farida Waller (Thai mother, Austrian father)
- Gawin Caskey (Thai mother, American father)
- Jarunee Suksawat (Thai mother, French father)
- Johnny Anfone (Thai German mother, Filipino father)
- Kimberly Ann Voltemas (Thai mother, German father)
- Kathaleeya McIntosh (Thai mother, Scottish father)
- Nadech Kugimiya (Thai mother, Austrian father)
- Maria Poonlertlarp (Thai mother, Swedish father)
- Mario Maurer (Thai mother, German father)
- Mick Tongraya (Thai mother, Danish father)
- Pamela Pasinetti (Thai mother, Italian father)
- Patrick Nattawat Finkler (Thai mother, German father)
- Paula Taylor (Thai mother, British father)
- Paweensuda Drouin (Thai mother, Canadian father)
- Praya Lundberg (Thai mother, Swedish father)
- Ranee Campen (Thai mother, English father)
- Rasri Balenciaga (Thai mother, Spanish father)
- Rebecca Patricia Armstrong (Thai mother, British father)
- Samantha Melanie Coates (Thai mother, English father)
- Sammy Cowell (Thai mother, English father)
- Sara Malakul Lane (Thai mother, English father)
- Sattabut Laedeke (Thai mother, American father)
- Sonia Couling (Thai mother, English father)
- Sonya Saranphat Pedersen (Thai mother, Danish father)
- Sririta Jensen (Thai mother, Danish father)
- Sunny Suwanmethanont (French mother, Thai Singaporean father)
- Tera Patrick (Thai mother, American father)
- Thitisan Goodburn (Thai mother, English father)
- Tommy Hatto (Thai mother, English father)
- Toon Hiranyasap (Thai mother, Filipino father)
- Urassaya Sperbund (Thai mother, Norwegian father)
- Willy McIntosh (Thai mother, Scottish father)

=== Singers and musicians ===
- Andrea Suárez (Thai-American-Spanish-Puerto Rican)
- Billy Ogan (Thai mother, Filipino father)
- Anan Anwar (Australian mother, Indonesian father)
- Myria Benedetti (Thai mother, Swiss father)
- Krissada Sukosol Clapp (Thai mother, American father)
- Lanna Commins (Thai mother, Australian father)
- Peter Corp Dyrendal (Thai mother, Danish father)
- Katreeya English (Thai mother, British father)
- Jakrapun Kornburiteerachote (Thai mother, American father)
- Joni Anwar (Australian mother, Indonesian father)
- Louis Scott (Thai mother, Scottish father)
- Chinawut Indracusin (Thai father, French mother)
- Conrad Keely (Thai, Irish, English)
- Roy Khan (Thai father, Norwegian mother)
- Rhema Marvanne (Thai father, American mother)
- Thongchai McIntyre (Thai Malay mother, Thai Swiss father)
- Thomas Meglioranza (Thai mother, American father)
- Thierry Mekwattana (Swiss mother, Thai Chinese father)
- Myra Molloy (Thai mother, American father)
- Palmy (Thai mother, Belgian father)
- Jeff Satur (Thai, Chinese, English)
- Nicole Theriault (Thai mother, American father)
- David Usher (Thai mother, Canadian father)
- Marsha Vadhanapanich (Thai father, German mother)
- Violette Wautier (Thai mother, Belgian father)
- Jannine Weigel (Thai mother, German father)
- Tata Young (Thai mother, American father)
- Christina Aguilar (Vietnamese mother, Filipino father)

== Royalty and nobility ==
=== Princes and princesses ===
- Prince Chula Chakrabongse (son of Prince Chakrabongse and his Ukrainian wife)
- Prince Piyarangsit (son of Prince Rangsit and his German wife)
- Prince Sanidh (son of Prince Rangsit and his German wife)
- Princess Charulaksana (daughter of Prince Rangsit and his German wife, relinquished royal title in 1945)

=== Royal descendants ===
- Mom Rajawongse Biradej Bhanubhand (son of Prince Bira and his Argentine wife)
- Mom Rajawongse Narisa Chakrabongse (daughter of Prince Chula and his British wife)

=== Khun ===
- Khun Ploypailin (daughter of Princess Ubolratana and her American husband)
- Khun Poom (son of Princess Ubolratana and her American husband)
- Khun Sirikitiya (daughter of Princess Ubolratana and her American husband)

=== No title ===
- Chulachak Chakrabongse (son of Mom Rajawongse Narisa Chakrabongse and her British husband)
- Leonardo Wheeler (son of Khun Ploypailin and her American husband)
- Maximus Wheeler (son of Khun Ploypailin and her American husband)

== Politics ==
- Prayoon Pamornmontri (Thai father, German mother)
- Tammy Duckworth (Thai mother, American father)
- John Pippy (Thai mother, American father)
- Jon and Giles Ji Ungpakorn (Thai father, English mother)
- Mechai Viravaidya (Thai father, Scottish mother)
- Rangsiman Rome (Thai mother, American father)
- Yuranunt Pamornmontri (son of Prayoon Pamornmontri)

== Sports ==
- Aree Song (Thai mother, Korean father)
- Naree Song (Thai mother, Korean father)
- Alexander Albon (Thai mother, English father)
- Dennis Buschening (Thai mother, German father)
- Amanda Mildred Carr (Thai mother, American father)
- Charyl Chappuis (Thai mother, Swiss father)
- Johnny Damon (Thai mother, American father)
- Geoff Huegill (Thai mother, Australian father)
- Kevin Kaesviharn (Thai father, American mother)
- Eric Koston (Thai mother, American father)
- Tyler Lamb (Thai mother, American father)
- August Gustafsson Lohaprasert (Thai father, Swedish mother)
- Tom Ramasut
- Sandy Stuvik (Thai mother, Norwegian father)
- Jamie Waite (Thai mother, British father)
- Michelle Waterson (Thai mother, American father)
- Mika Chunuonsee (Welsh mother, Thai father)
- Geoffrey Prommayon (Thai mother, American father)
- Tristan Do (French mother, Vietnamese-Thai father)
- Tiger Woods (Thai mother, American father)
