= Kasetsart University Laboratory School =

Coordinates: 13°51′05″N 100°34′01″E

Kasetsart University Laboratory School, Center for Educational Research and Development

Location
- 50 Ngam Wong Wan Road, Lat Yao; Chatuchak, Bangkok, 10900; Thailand

Information
- Type: Public, Laboratory
- Motto: Intelligence, endurance, steadfastness and morality lead practitioners to success
- Established: 22 April 1971
- Founder: Ubol Reangsuwan
- Director: Pakamas Nantajeewarawat, Ph.D.
- Faculty: 507
- Grades: 1-12
- Enrollment: 4768
- Colors: Purple and Green
- Website: http://www.kus.ku.ac.th/

Kasetsart University Laboratory School, Center for Educational Research and Development (Thai: โรงเรียนสาธิตแห่งมหาวิทยาลัยเกษตรศาสตร์ ศูนย์วิจัยและพัฒนาการศึกษา; RTGS: Rongrian Sathit Haeng Mahawitthayalai Kasetsat Sun Wichai Lae Phatthana Kansueksa), informally known as Satit Kaset (Thai: สาธิตเกษตร; RTGS: Sathit Kaset), is a well-known laboratory school in Bangkok, Thailand, operated under the auspices of Kasetsart University's Faculty of Education. The school is located in Bang Khen campus of the university.

== Overview ==
Kasetsart University Laboratory School was established on 22 April 1971 as the field base for the students of the Faculty of Education, under John Dewey's principle "The conception underlying the school is that of a laboratory ... It has two main purposes: (1) to exhibit, test, vertify and criticize theoretical statements and principles, (2) to add to the sum of facts and principles in its special line.". The founder and first principal was Prof. Dr Ubol Reangsuwan. The school provides elementary, junior, and high school levels education. It also has the International Program and the Multi-Lingual Program. The enrollment of students is officially done only in Grade 1, but it is known that there are some minor enrollments in Grade 7 and 10. The students with special needs including autism and hyperactivity, are accepted into the special program.

== International Program ==
The International Program of Kasetsart University Laboratory School was first provided in 1994. It was the result of the government's plan to develop the English skill of Thai people. The International Program, sometimes referred as Satit Kaset IP, was the first public international school in Thailand. The program is run in a separate building located in the same campus as the regular program. With the exception of classes such as Thai language, Buddhism (Grades 7–12), Thai Music, D. Skills (Grades 7–12), Chinese (Grades 7–12), HPE or Health and Social Culture (Grades 1–6), all classes are taught in English by native speakers using an American-based curriculum.

== Multi-Lingual Program ==
The Multi-Lingual Program (Thai: โครงการพหุภาษา) was initiated in 2000. Unlike the IP, subjects in this program are taught in Thai, same as the normal program, but the students of this program have to choose the "third language";Chinese or Japanese, in Grade 4. The program has its own campus in Amatanakorn Industrial Park, Chonburi, 28 kilometers from Si Racha campus of Kasetsart University.

== Alumni ==
- Bhumi Jensen, a grandson of King Bhumibol Adulyadej
- Khemanit Jamikorn, nicknamed "Pancake", Model of the World 2004 winner, actress
- Suppasit Jongcheveevat, nicknamed "Mew", actor and singer
- Sutatta Udomsilp, nicknamed "Punpun", actress and singer
- Tanakorn Chinakul, nicknamed "Bo", actor
- Pongsatorn Jongwilas, nicknamed "Phuak", actor

== Miscellaneous ==
- The school adopted the logo of the university, Phra Pirun Song Nak (Thai:พระพิรุณทรงนาค, Varuna on the Naga), as the school emblem. The difference is that the school version does not have the surrounding circle.
- The school colors are purple and green. Purple is the color of the university's Faculty of Education, and green is the color of the university.
- The school's "purple-skirt" uniform is quite unique and well-known, since most schools in Thailand use blue or black uniform. It also created the nickname Satit Krapong Muang (Thai:สาธิตกระโปรงม่วง, Purple-skirt Satit).
- The school is one of the few schools in Thailand to use the term 'laboratory school' in their English name, after John Dewey's laboratory school. The other Satit schools prefer the term 'demonstration school', the direct translation of satit (Thai: สาธิต).
- There is also a school in the university's Kamphaeng Saen campus named Kasetsart University Laboratory School Kamphaeng Saen Campus Center for Educational Research and Development. It is up to the Faculty of Education at Kamphaeng Saen and considered different school, despite its connections with the Bang Khen one, similar name, uniforms, emblem, and anthem.

== See also ==
- List of schools in Thailand
