= Sirikitiya Jensen =

Thai royal family and historic figure

Than Phu Ying Sirikitiya Jensen
- สิริกิติยา เจนเซน
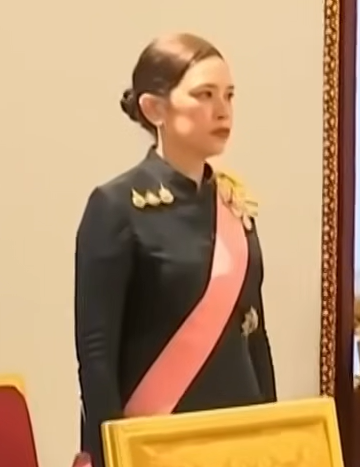
- Sirikitiya in 2026
- Born: Mai Jensen; 18 March 1985 (age 41); San Diego, California, US
- Education: University of California, Riverside; New York University
- Parents: Peter Ladd Jensen (father); Ubol Ratana (mother)

Than Phu Ying Sirikitiya Jensen (Note: Thai: สิริกิติยา เจนเซน) (born March 18, 1985), or Sirikitiya Mai Jensen (Note: Thai: สิริกิตติยา ใหม่ เจนเสน; RTGS: Sirikittiya Mai Chensen), born Mai Jensen (Thai: ใหม่ เจนเซน)), is a granddaughter of King Bhumibol Adulyadej of Thailand and a niece of King Vajiralongkorn of Thailand. She is a daughter of Princess Ubolratana Rajakanya (King Bhumibol's eldest daughter) and her American former husband Peter Ladd Jensen. She is also known by her birth name and nickname as Khun Mai.

== Early life ==
Sirikitiya is the youngest of three children. Her older sister is Than Phu Ying Ploypailin, and her older brother was Khun Poom. Sirikitiya and her siblings grew up in San Diego, California, United States. She and her brother attended Torrey Pines High School, a public school. After their parents' divorce in 1998, Princess Ubolratana and Poom moved back to Thailand in July 2001. Sirikitiya stayed in San Diego with her father and graduated from high school in 2003.

She was named after her maternal grandmother, Queen Sirikit.

== Education ==
Jensen attended University of California, Riverside. She graduated from New York University (class of 2007), majoring in East Asian studies, with a focus on the histories of Japan and China.

== Works and interests ==
After graduation, she worked in fashion as an apprentice of Japanese designer Yohji Yamamoto and with Hermes because she wanted to be creative while working and saw fashion as the most fun thing. Later, she worked independently by opening a website that combines advertising websites. Than Phu Ying Sirikitiya has been interested in the curatorial work at the Metropolitan Museum of Art since working at Hermes.

After returning to live in Thailand, she attended an internship in the conservation academic group, Office of Architecture, The Fine Arts Department, from September 2016. After the internship was completed, she was appointed as a government official at Level 3 of the said department on May 1, 2017, in the position of operative arts officer of the Historical group, Office of Literature and History, on temporary duty at the Office of Architecture, Department of Fine Arts. In 2017, Than Phu Ying Sirikitiya was responsible for the construction of the royal crematorium for the royal cremation ceremony of His Majesty King Bhumibol Adulyadej the Great as a civil servant. Later, in 2018, Than Phu Ying Sirikitiya was the project director of "Wang Na Nimit", which collects and disseminates information about the Front Palace which is exhibited using visual language technology. She said of the exhibition, "This exhibition was made with the intention of wanting the young generation to see how history and the present go together. And to feel that history is not far from you."

In July 2018, Than Phu Ying Sirikitiya visited the important historical sites in Songkhla such as Songkhla National Museum, Khao Tang Kuan, Ko Yo, Thaksin Case Studies Institute, Wat Matchimawat and the Islamic Muslim Mosque to promote and push Songkhla as the world’s heritage city.

On 6 March to 28 April 2019, Than Phu Ying Sirikitiya, together with Natali Butang and Mary Pansanga, organized the project "Wang Na Narumit" and the exhibition "Implicit plane outside ins Two: transforming the past into the present" at the Issara Palace, The Bangkok National Museum to learn about the title Front Palace but this time, added a piece of 20 outstanding people from different circles and one choir Create a work that represents the palace as the aptitude and exhibition.

== Royal decorations ==
- Knight Grand Cordon (Special Class) of the Order of the Crown of Thailand (2008)
- Dame Grand Commander (Second Class) of the Order of Chula Chom Klao (2019)
- King Rama IX Royal Cypher Medal, First Class
- King Rama X Royal Cypher Medal, Second Class

== Notes ==
Order of precedence
Preceded by Dame Ploypailin Jensen	Thai order of precedence 12th position	Succeeded by Dame Dhasanawalaya Sornsongkram
