= Ploypailin Jensen =

Thai royal family

Than Phu Ying Ploypailin Jensen
- พลอยไพลิน เจนเซน
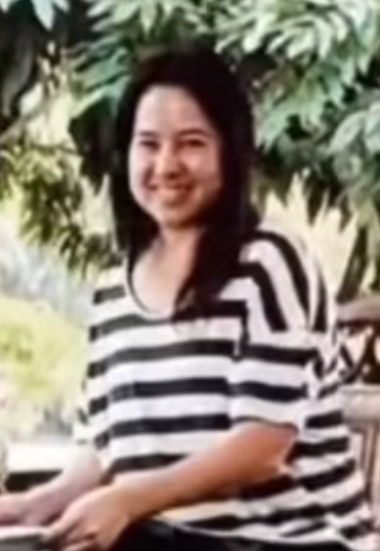
- Born: 12 February 1981 (age 45); San Diego, California, US
- Education: University of California, San Diego (BS); MIT Sloan School of Management (MBA)
- Spouse: David Wheeler (m. 2009)
- Children: 3
- Parents: Peter Ladd Jensen (father); Ubol Ratana (mother)

Than Phu Ying Ploypailin Jensen (Thai: พลอยไพลิน เจนเซน; RTGS: Phloiphailin Chensen; born February 12, 1981) is a member of the Thai royal family, a granddaughter of King Bhumibol Adulyadej of Thailand and a niece of King Vajiralongkorn of Thailand. She is the eldest offspring of Princess Ubolratana Rajakanya of Thailand. Ploypailin is not in the line of succession to the throne of Thailand as her mother relinquished her royal title when she married Ploypailin's American father, Peter Ladd Jensen.

== Early life and education ==
Born in 1981 in San Diego, and known as Khun Ploypailin in Thailand, she is the grandchild of King Bhumibol Adulyadej and Queen Sirikit of Thailand and the eldest daughter of Princess Ubol Ratana. Her given name was proposed by her aunt, Princess Maha Chakri Sirindhorn.

Ploypailin had a younger brother, Poom Jensen (1983–2004), and a younger sister, Sirikitiya Jensen (b. 1985).

Ploypailin attended the Purcell School, England. She received a bachelor's degree with honors in cognitive psychology from the University of California, San Diego in 2003 and an MBA degree from the MIT Sloan School of Management in 2007.

== Personal life ==
As a pianist, she has given performances around the world, including at the Sydney Opera House, and other venues in Europe and Japan. She also has had occasional honorary starring roles in Thai soap operas, dramas, and musicals, including Nemiraj - Scenes from Ten Lives of the Buddha. A socialite, she has been an occasional model for Thai fashion magazines and society publications.

Ploypailin married her long-time boyfriend David Wheeler in Hawaii, United States on 25 August 2009. He was born on 31 March 1976 in Bogotá and is the adopted son of George and Marcia Wheeler. They have two sons and a daughter.

== Royal decorations ==
- Knight Grand Cordon (Special Class) of the Order of the Crown of Thailand (2008)
- Dame Grand Commander of the Order of Chula Chom Klao (2019)
- King Rama IX Royal Cypher Medal, First Class
- King Rama X Royal Cypher Medal, Second Class

Order of precedence
Preceded by Princess Aditayadorn Kitikhun	Thai order of precedence 11th position	Succeeded by Dame Sirikitiya Jensen
