= Luk khrueng =

Thai term for people with parents of different nationalities

Luk khrueng (Thai: ลูกครึ่ง, literally "half-child") is a colloquial Thai term referring to a person whose parents are of different nationalities. In a narrow sense, luk khrueng means people of mixed Thai and foreign origin. However, a person of mixed Thai and Chinese origin is called chao Thai chuea sai Chin (Thai: ชาวไทยเชื้อสายจีน, lit. 'a Thai who has Chinese blood'), rather than luk khrueng.

In the mid-20th century the number of luk khrueng increased dramatically following World War II, with the increasing number of Western residents and visitors to the country. Many were the children of American servicemen who moved to the country in the 1960s and the 1970s, when there were several large U.S. military bases in the country because of the Vietnam War. While some of the servicemen formed lasting relationships with Thai women, some luk khrueng were the product of temporary relationships with "rented wives" or sex workers, a fact that led to some discrimination in that era. Some Thais were also hostile because of the perceived lack of racial purity but most were quite accepting.

In the modern era, many luk khrueng are born of relationships and marriages when Westerners come to live and to work in Thailand or when Thai people go to study in Western or foreign countries.

In more recent generations, luk khrueng have become accepted and even embraced by society and many luk khrueng have carved out a prominent role in the entertainment industry in which their often-fluent English and their Caucasian features (such as fair skin, larger or colored eyes and allegedly tall physique), which are deemed attractive in Thai culture, have proved to be advantageous. Within teenage culture these features are also extremely popular.

== See also ==
- List of luk khrueng people
- Bụi đời
- Coloured
- Farang
- Eurasian, Amerasian
- Hapa
- Hāfu
- Hun-Xue-Er
- Mestizo
- Multiracial
- Mixed-blood
