= Ubol Ratana =

Thai princess (born 1951)

Thunkramom Ying Ubol Ratana
- อุบลรัตน
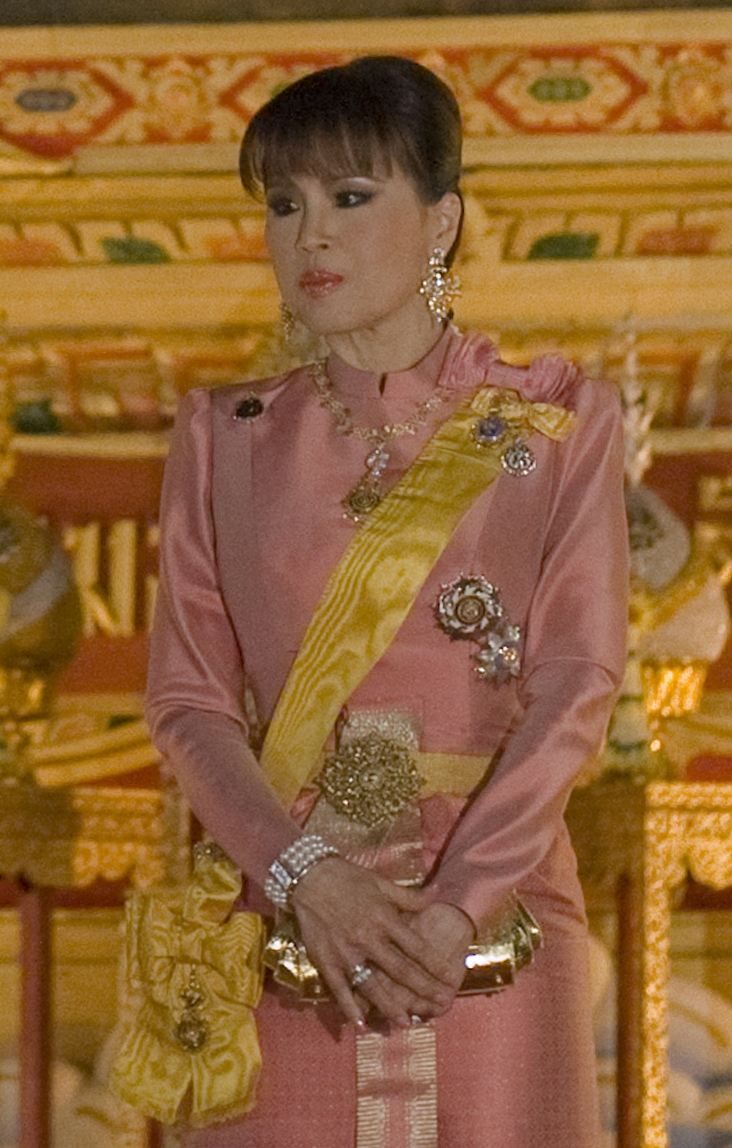
- Ubol Ratana in 2010
- Born: 5 April 1951 (age 75); Lausanne, Switzerland
- Other names: Pay, Julie Jensen
- Education: Massachusetts Institute of Technology (BS); University of California, Los Angeles (MPH)
- Spouse: Peter Ladd Jensen (m. 1972; div. 1998)
- Children: Ploypailin Jensen; Poom Jensen; Sirikitiya Jensen
- Parents: Bhumibol Adulyadej (father); Sirikit Kitiyakara (mother)
- Relatives: Vajiralongkorn (brother)
- Sports career
Medal record
Sailing
Representing Thailand
SEAP Games
Gold medal – first place	1967 Bangkok	OK Dinghy

Signature
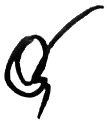

Ubol Ratana (Note: Thai: ทูลกระหม่อมหญิงอุบลรัตนราชกัญญา สิริวัฒนาพรรณวดี, RTGS: Thunkramom Ying Ubonratratchakanya Siriwatthanaphannawadi, pronounced [tʰūːn.krā.mɔ̀m jǐŋ ʔù.bōn.rát.râːt.tɕʰā.kān.jāː sì.rì.wát.tʰā.nāː.pʰān.nā.wā.dīː]) (born 5 April 1951) is a member of the Thai royal family. She is the eldest child of King Bhumibol Adulyadej (Rama IX) and Queen Sirikit, and the elder sister of King Vajiralongkorn (Rama X).

In 1972, she married American citizen Peter Ladd Jensen and settled in the United States, after giving up her royal title. The couple divorced in 1998, whereupon she resumed her royal duties and position within the Thai court. She is styled in English as Princess Ubol Ratana, without the style Her Royal Highness.

In 2001, she permanently returned to Thailand after a series of visits in the years following her divorce. Almost immediately, she began to fulfill her royal duties by taking part in many ceremonies. She started many charitable foundations that focused on improving the quality of life for the disadvantaged.

In February 2019, in an "unprecedented" move, Ubol Ratana announced her candidacy for Prime Minister of Thailand in the 2019 general election, running as a candidate of the Thai Raksa Chart Party. Later that same day, her younger brother King Vajiralongkorn issued a statement, stating that her candidacy is "inappropriate" and "unconstitutional". Thailand's election commission then disqualified her from running for prime minister, formally putting an end to her candidacy.

== Early life ==
Princess Ubol Ratana Rajakanya is the eldest child of King Bhumibol Adulyadej and Queen Sirikit. She was born on 5 April 1951, at Clinique de Montchoisi in Lausanne, Switzerland. She is the only child born outside of Thailand from the four children of former King Bhumibol and Queen Sirikit.

Ubol Ratana, part of her royal name, means "glass lotus", a reference to her maternal grandmother, Bua ("lotus") Kitiyakara. Her parents nicknamed her "Pay", short for Poupée (French for "doll"). To her family she is known as Phi Ying. In the media and by Thai people in general, she is called Thun Kramom Ying, a title identifying the daughter of a reigning king with the queen.

She returned to Thailand and stayed at Amphorn Sathan Residential Hall, Dusit Palace. She was styled "Her Royal Highness" by her father at the royal celebration of the first month birthday ceremony (Phra Ratchaphithi Somphot Duean Lae Khuen Phra U; พระราชพิธีสมโภชเดือนและขึ้นพระอู่) King Bhumibol Adulyadej gave her full name and title "Her Royal Highness Princess Ubol Ratana Rajakanya Sirivadhana Barnavadi".

Ubol Ratana was Bhumibol's favorite child, because she was attractive and excelled at academics and sports, whereas her brother, Vajiralongkorn, did not. The King greatly enjoyed playing tennis and badminton with her. This was partly due to his suspicion that others were not trying their hardest when playing sports with him, and he admired Ubol Ratana for always trying her best.

In the 1967 Southeast Asian Peninsular Games (today called the "Southeast Asian Games") held in Bangkok, the Ling and the princess competed in the OK Dinghy sailing class and won gold medals for Thailand.

Their participation was conceived by Air Chief Marshal Dawee Chullasapya, who wanted King Bhumibol to be seen excelling in sports, much like King Olav V of Norway, who won an Olympic gold medal. During the race, Ubol Ratana was ahead and the King was trailing behind. Dawee feared that this would tarnish the King's prestige, but the King ultimately won the race, and the father and daughter shared the medal.

== Education ==
Ubol Ratana attended primary to secondary levels at Chitralada School. She went to the United States for her tertiary education. She studied at Massachusetts Institute of Technology, graduating with a Bachelor of Science in mathematics in 1973. She later obtained a master's degree in public health at University of California, Los Angeles.

== Marriage and family ==
While studying at university, Ubol Ratana dated an American, Peter Ladd Jensen (b. 1951), then a fellow student at the Massachusetts Institute of Technology. The palace discovered this, and her parents strongly opposed their relationship. The princess refused to conform to their wishes; on 19 August 1972, she married Jensen at All Saints Episcopal Church (San Diego, California).

According to Paul M. Handley's biography of Bhumibol, the King became furious at Ubol Ratana and stripped her of her royal title. Ubol Ratana made many attempts to ask her father to reinstate her royal title before and after her permanent return to Thailand, but the King never relented.

The princess lived in the United States with her husband for over 26 years and took the name "Mrs. Julie Jensen" (previously "Miss Ubolratana Mahidol"). After years of rumoured marital problems, they divorced in 1998. Ubol Ratana and her children continued to reside in San Diego until 2001, when they returned to Thailand.

The couple had three children, two daughters and a son, all born in the United States:

- Than Phu Ying Ploypailin Mahidol Jensen (born 12 February 1981) married David Wheeler on 25 August 2009, and has three children.
- Khun Bhumi Jensen (affectionately known as Khun Poom) (16 August 1983 – 26 December 2004), who had autism, died in the 2004 tsunami. Princess Ubol Ratana established the Khun Poom Foundation in his memory, to aid children with autism and other learning disabilities.
- Than Phu Ying Sirikitiya Mai Jensen (born 18 March 1985) holds a degree in history.

While Ubol Ratana remained in the US, her mother (Queen Sirikit) and other members of the royal family often flew there for visits. Ubol Ratana likewise flew to Thailand along with her husband to visit her parents and the other members of the royal family, while joining them in royal ceremonies when she visited Thailand. She visited in 1980, 1982, 1987, 1992 and 1996, taking part in several family events, before her permanent return in 2001.

== Charitable work ==
Ubol Ratana launched the "To Be Number One" Foundation in 2002 to combat drug use by young people. As of 2019 the foundation has more than 31 million members throughout Thailand. She hosts the television show, "Talk to the Princess" on TVT11 NBT where she promotes the aims of her anti-drug work.

== LGBTQ support ==
In 2021, Ubol Ratana revealed that she is a fujoshi through her Princess Vlog on the YouTube channel of "To Be Number One" Foundation. She said she had grown up around gays and she supported LGBTQ. She is a big fan of many BL couples and series such as Bright-Win from 2gether, Kao-Up from Lovely Writer, Pond-Phuwin from Fish upon the Sky, etc.

In 2024, one of the judges in the qualifying round for the representative of Phitsanulok Province in "To be Number One Idol" contest criticized the LGBTQ youth contestant with inappropriate words, causing widespread criticism. Later, Ubol Ratana commented on Instagram that she never discriminated against LGBTQ and she supported them.

== Film career ==
In 2003, Ubol Ratana starred in a Thai soap opera, Kasattiya. In 2006 she had a role in Anantalai, a drama series she wrote under the pen name "Ploykampetch". In 2011, the princess and her daughter Ploypailin Jensen starred in Dao Long Fah, Pupha Si-ngen.

Ubol Ratana acted in the Thai movie Where The Miracle Happens (Neung Jai Diaokan) (หนึ่งใจ..เดียวกัน), released on 7 August 2008 (in this film she also participated as a screenwriter). She plays a "lonely-at-the-top" CEO who begins a life of philanthropy after the death of her only daughter. In 2010, she appeared in the action film My Best Bodyguard (มายเบสท์บอดี้การ์ด), released on 21 October 2010. In 2012, she appeared in the romantic film Together (Wan Tee Rak) (ร่วมกัน), released on 20 December 2012.

== Attempted candidacy for Prime Minister ==
In 2019, it was announced Ubol Ratana would run as the prime ministerial candidate for the Thaksin-affiliated Thai Raksa Chart Party in the 2019 general election, called an "astonishing" move without precedent, as the royal family has never been directly involved in electoral politics. Her candidacy was quickly denounced by her brother, King Rama X, on the grounds that members of the royal family may not overtly participate in politics. After his statement, the Thai Raksa Chart Party withdrew their support for her run. The Election Commission, citing the king's statement, disqualified her, while the Thai Raksa Chart Party was dissolved by the Constitutional Court on the request of the Electoral Commission for attempting to bring a member of the royal family into politics; its leaders were banned from active politics for a decade.

== See also ==
- Ubol Ratana Dam
- Ubol Ratana District

Ubol Ratana House of Mahidol Cadet branch of the House of Chakri Born: 5 April 1951
Order of precedence
Preceded by The Princess Srisavangavadhana	Thai order of precedence 5th position	Succeeded by The Princess Suddhanarinatha
Non-profit organization positions
First	President of TO BE NUMBER ONE Foundation; 2002–present	Incumbent
Honorary titles
Preceded by Queen Sirikit, the Queen Mother	Eldest Royal Member of the Chakri Dynasty; 2025–present	Incumbent; Next: King Rama X
