= Bhumibol Adulyadej =

King of Thailand from 1946 to 2016

- King Rama IX
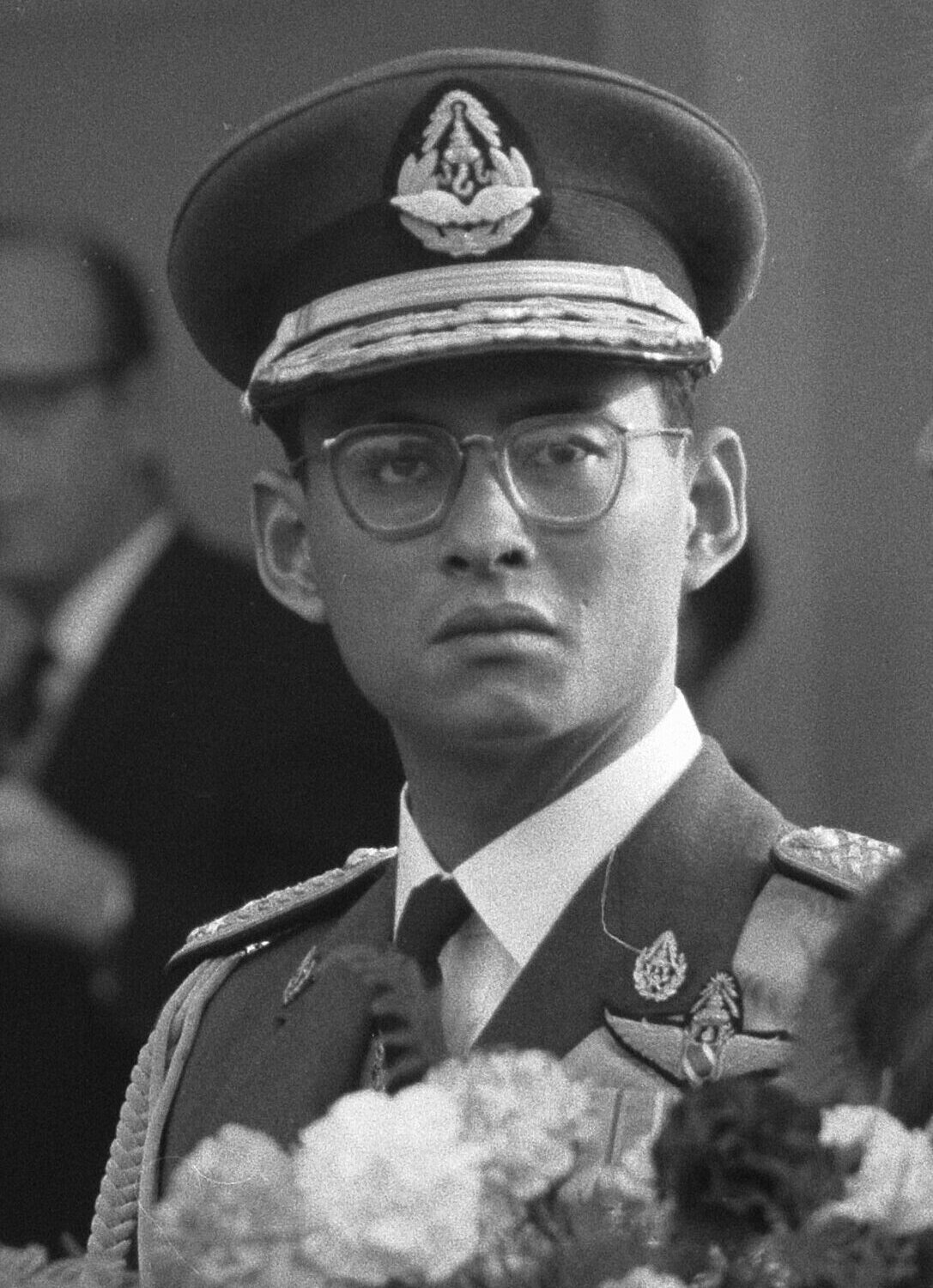
- Bhumibol in 1960

King of Thailand
- Reign: 9 June 1946 – 13 October 2016
- Coronation: 5 May 1950
- Predecessor: Ananda Mahidol (Rama VIII)
- Successor: Vajiralongkorn (Rama X)
- Regents: See list: Suthammawinichai (1946); Nalasuwat (1946); Sanguan Chudatemi (1946); Manavaratsevi (1946–1949); Rangsit Prayurasakdi (1946–1949, 1949, 1950–1951); Alongkot (1947–1949); Adun Adundetcharat (1947–1949); Dhani Nivat (1947–1949, 1951–1952, 1963); Sirikit Kitiyakara (1956); Srinagarindra (1959, 1960, 1962, 1964, 1966, 1967)
- Born: 5 December 1927; Cambridge, Massachusetts, US
- Died: 13 October 2016 (aged 88); Bangkok, Thailand
- Burial: 26 October 2017; Sanam Luang, Bangkok
- Spouse: Sirikit Kitiyakara (m. 1950)
- Issue Detail: Princess Ubol Ratana; Vajiralongkorn (Rama X); Sirindhorn, Princess Royal; Chulabhorn, Princess Srisavangavadhana
- House: Mahidol (Note: In the Thai tradition, the house (ราชสกุล) is distinct from the dynasty (ราชวงศ์). Bhumibol Adulyadej was the second king of the House of Mahidol (ราชสกุลมหิดล) and the ninth king of the Chakri dynasty (ราชวงศ์จักรี).)
- Dynasty: Chakri
- Father: Mahidol Adulyadej
- Mother: Sangwan Talapat
- Religion: Theravada Buddhism
- Sports career
Medal record
Sailing
Representing Thailand
SEAP Games
| Gold medal – first place | 1967 Bangkok | OK Dinghy |

Bhumibol Adulyadej (Note: Thai: ภูมิพลอดุลยเดช; RTGS: Phumiphon Adunyadet; pronounced [pʰūː.mí.pʰōn ʔà.dūn.já.dèːt]; (Sanskrit: bhūmi·bala atulya·teja – "might of the land, unparalleled brilliance")) (Note: In 2019, he was posthumously conferred by King Vajiralongkorn with the title of Bhumibol the Great, which had been informally used since 1987.) (5 December 1927 – 13 October 2016), titled Rama IX, was King of Thailand from 9 June 1946 until his death in 2016. His reign of 70 years and 126 days is the longest of any Thai monarch, the longest on record of any independent Asian sovereign, and the third-longest of any sovereign state with a verified date.

Born in the United States, Bhumibol spent his early life in Switzerland, growing up in the aftermath of the 1932 Siamese revolution which toppled Thailand's centuries-old absolute monarchy, ruled at the time by his uncle, King Prajadhipok (Rama VII). He ascended to the throne in June 1946 succeeding his brother, King Ananda Mahidol (Rama VIII), who had died under mysterious circumstances.

During the course of his rule, Bhumibol presided over Thailand's transformation into a major US ally and regional power in Southeast Asia. Between 1985 and 1994, Thailand was the world's fastest-growing economy according to the World Bank, and was predicted by many international journalists to be the next "Asian Tiger" in the 1990s. During this period, the country also saw the emergence of an urban middle class as well as mass political participation in its electoral politics. However, this rapid economic growth came to an end with the 1997 Asian financial crisis which triggered political instability in Thailand during the 2000s and 2010s. Bhumibol's reign experienced several periods of gradual democratization punctuated by military coups. The 2014 coup, the last coup during Bhumibol's reign, ended 20 years of civilian government and saw the return of the Thai military's influence within Thai politics.

Forbes estimated Bhumibol's fortune—including property and investments managed by the Crown Property Bureau, a body that is neither private nor government-owned (assets managed by the Bureau were owned by the crown as an institution, not by the monarch as an individual)—to be US$30 billion in 2010, and he headed the magazine's list of the "world's richest royals" from 2008 to 2013. In 2014, Bhumibol's wealth was again listed as US$30 billion.

Bhumibol was highly revered in Thailand—some saw him as close to divine. Notable political activists and Thai citizens who criticized the king or the institution of monarchy were often forced into exile or suffered frequent imprisonments. After a period of deteriorating health which left him hospitalized on several occasions, Bhumibol died in 2016 at Siriraj Hospital. He was succeeded as king by his son Vajiralongkorn, who became King Rama X of Thailand. Bhumibol's cremation was held in 2017 at the royal crematorium at Sanam Luang.

== Early life ==
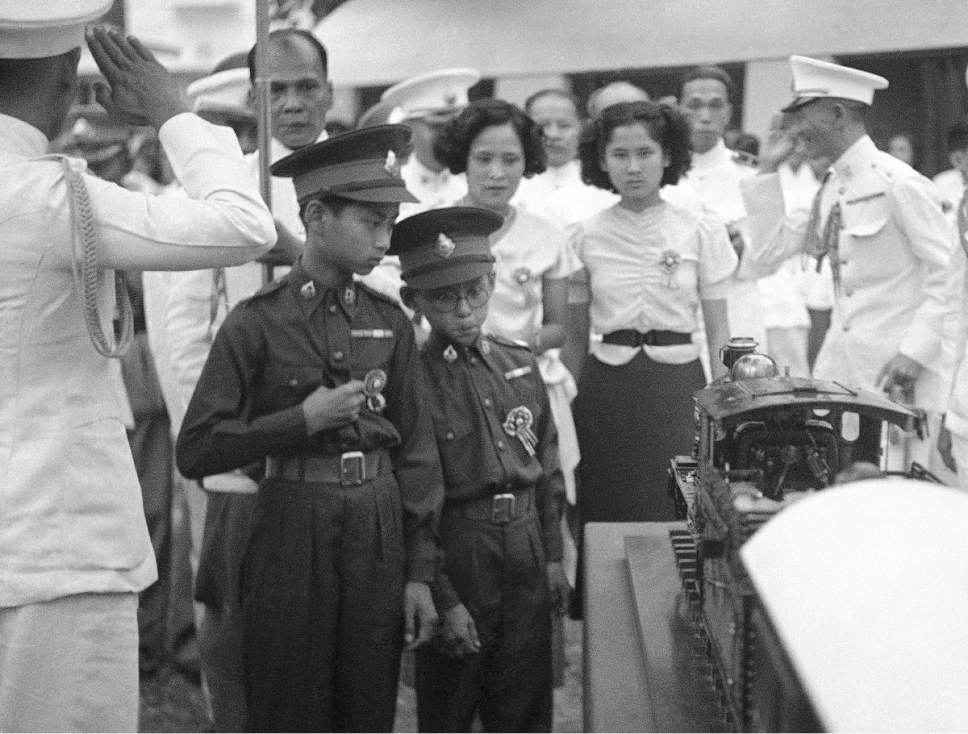
Bhumibol (right) with his brother, King Ananda Mahidol in 1938

Bhumibol was born at Cambridge Hospital (now Mount Auburn Hospital) in Cambridge, Massachusetts, United States, on 5 December 1927, during the reign of his paternal uncle, King Rama VII (Prajadhipok). He was the youngest son of Prince Mahidol Adulyadej, the Prince of Songkla, and his commoner wife Mom Sangwan (later Princess Srinagarindra, the Princess Mother). His father was enrolled in the public health program at Harvard University, which is why Bhumibol was the only hereditary monarch to be born in the US. Bhumibol had an older sister, Princess Galyani Vadhana, and an older brother, Prince Ananda Mahidol.

His US birth certificate read simply "Baby Songkla", as the parents had to consult his uncle, King Prajadhipok, then head of the House of Chakri, for an auspicious name. The king chose a name of Sanskrit origin, Bhumibol Adulyadej (Devanagari: भूमिबल अतुल्यतेज, IAST: Bhūmibala Atulyateja), a compound of Bhūmi (भूमि), meaning "Land"; Bala (बल), meaning "Strength" or "Power"; Atulya (अतुल्य), meaning "Incomparable"; and Tej (तेज), meaning "Power". Thus, Bhūmibala Atulyateja, or Bhumibol Adulyadej as it is transliterated in Thai, can be literally translated as "Strength of the Land, Incomparable Power".

Bhumibol came to Thailand in 1928, after his father obtained a certificate from Harvard. His father died of kidney failure in September 1929, when Bhumibol was less than two years old. He briefly attended Mater Dei school in Bangkok, but in 1933 his mother took her family to Switzerland, where he continued his education at the École nouvelle de la Suisse romande in Lausanne. In 1934 Bhumibol was given his first camera, which ignited his lifelong enthusiasm for photography. When Bhumibol's childless uncle Prajadhipok abdicated in 1935, his nine-year-old brother Ananda Mahidol became King Rama VIII. However, the family remained in Switzerland and the affairs of the head of state were conducted by a regency council. They returned to Thailand for only two months in 1938. In 1942, Bhumibol became a jazz enthusiast, and started to play the saxophone, a passion that he kept throughout his life. He received the baccalauréat des lettres (high-school diploma with a major in French literature, Latin, and Greek) from the Gymnase Classique Cantonal de Lausanne, and by 1945 had begun studying sciences at the University of Lausanne, when World War II ended and the family was able to return to Thailand.

== Accession ==
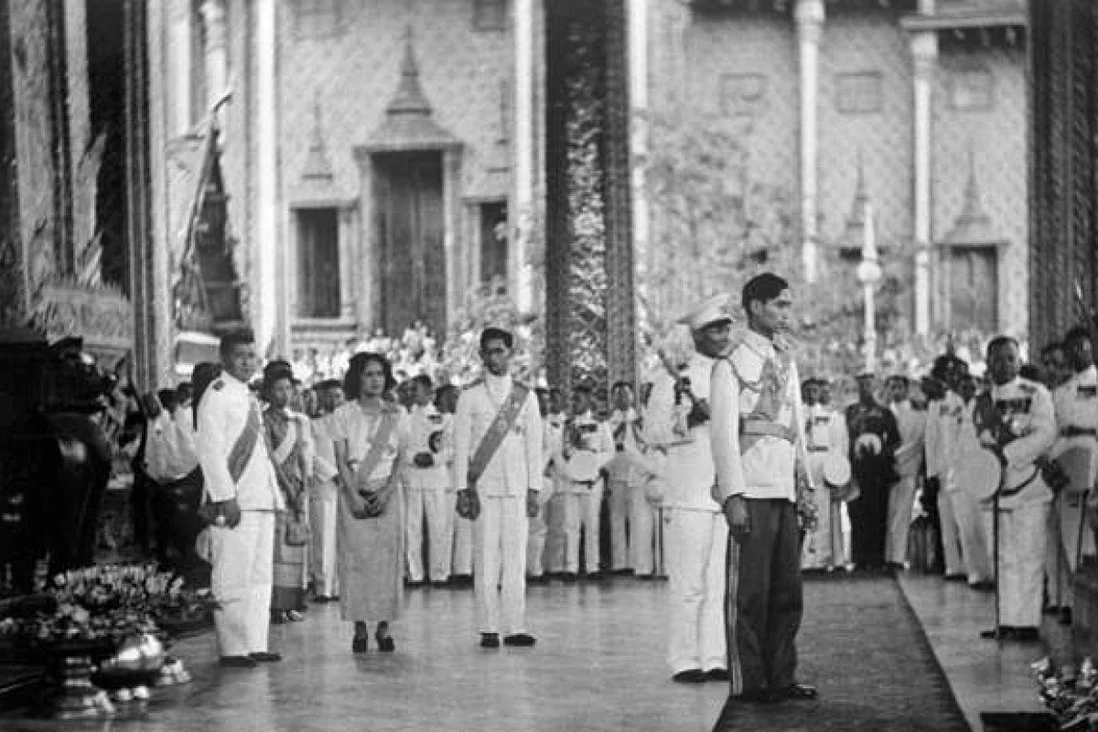
King Ananda Mahidol returned from Switzerland to Thailand, during an official ceremony in January 1946 in Bangkok, with Pridi Banomyong, Srinagarindra, and Prince Bhumibol which was not long before the King's death.

Bhumibol ascended the throne following the death by gunshot wound of his brother, King Ananda Mahidol, on 9 June 1946, under circumstances that remain unclear. While an initial government statement stated that Ananda had accidentally shot himself, an investigation committee ruled this was virtually impossible. Three palace aides (Chit Singhaseni, But Patthamasarin, and Chaliao Pathumrot) were eventually convicted of regicide, and were executed by firing squad on 17 February 1955, after their appeals for clemency were rejected by Bhumibol. A third possibility, that Bhumibol accidentally shot his brother while the brothers played with their pistols, was never officially considered.

Bhumibol succeeded his brother, but returned to Switzerland before the end of the 100-day mourning period. Despite his interest in science and technology, he changed his major and enrolled in law and political science to prepare for his duties as head of state. His uncle, Rangsit, Prince of Chainat, was appointed Prince Regent. In Bhumibol's name, Prince Rangsit acknowledged a military coup that overthrew the government of Thamrongnawasawat in November 1947. The regent also signed the 1949 constitution, which returned to the monarchy many of the powers it had lost by the 1932 revolution.

In December 1946, the Siamese government allocated several hundred thousand dollars for the ceremonial cremation of the remains of the late King Ananda, a necessary preliminary to the coronation of Bhumibol who was required by religious custom to light the funeral pyre. Unsettled conditions following the 1947 coup resulted in a postponement, and court astrologers determined that 2 March 1949 was the most auspicious date.

In 1948, the royalist government made a law that increased the power to control the Crown Property by the monarch as the restoration of their political power and assets, which was taken to the state property by the People Party from the Siamese revolution of 1932. Additionally, former Queen Rambhai Barni, Bhumibol's aunt was returned the 6 million baht that the People Party seized.

== Marriage and issue ==
While doing his degree in Switzerland, Bhumibol visited Paris frequently. It was in Paris that he first met Mom Rajawongse Sirikit Kitiyakara, daughter of the Thai ambassador to France (Nakkhatra Mangala) and a great-granddaughter of King Chulalongkorn and thus a cousin of Bhumibol. She was then 15 years old and training to be a concert pianist.

On 4 October 1948, while Bhumibol was driving a Fiat Topolino on the Geneva-Lausanne road, he collided with the rear of a braking truck 10 km outside Lausanne. He injured his back, suffered paralysis in half of his face and incurred cuts on his face that cost him the sight of his right eye. Both the royal cremation and coronation had to be postponed once more. While he was hospitalised in Lausanne, Sirikit visited him frequently. She met his mother, who asked her to continue her studies nearby so that Bhumibol could get to know her better. Bhumibol selected for her a boarding school in Lausanne, Riante Rive. A quiet engagement in Lausanne followed on 19 July 1949, and they were married on 28 April 1950, just a week before his coronation. Their wedding was described by The New York Times as "the shortest, simplest royal wedding ever held in the land of gilded elephants and white umbrellas". The ceremony was performed by Bhumibol's ageing grandmother, Savang Vadhana.

Bhumibol and Sirikit had four children:

- (Formerly HRH) Princess Ubol Ratana, born 5 April 1951 in Lausanne, Switzerland; married Peter Ladd Jensen (now divorced), and has two daughters. Her son, Bhumi Jensen, was killed in the tsunami caused by the 2004 Indian Ocean earthquake.
- King Maha Vajiralongkorn (Rama X), born 28 July 1952; married Mom Luang Soamsawali Kitiyakara (later divorced and became HRH the Princess Niece); one daughter. Then married Yuvadhida Polpraserth (later divorced); four sons and a daughter. Third marriage was to Srirasmi Suwadee (now divorced); one son. Fourth and current marriage is to Suthida Tidjai.
- HRH Princess Maha Chakri Sirindhorn, The Princess Royal, born 2 April 1955; never married, no issue
- HRH Princess Chulabhorn, The Princess Srisavangavadhana, born 4 July 1957; married Virayudh Tishyasarin (now divorced); two daughters

== Coronation and titles ==
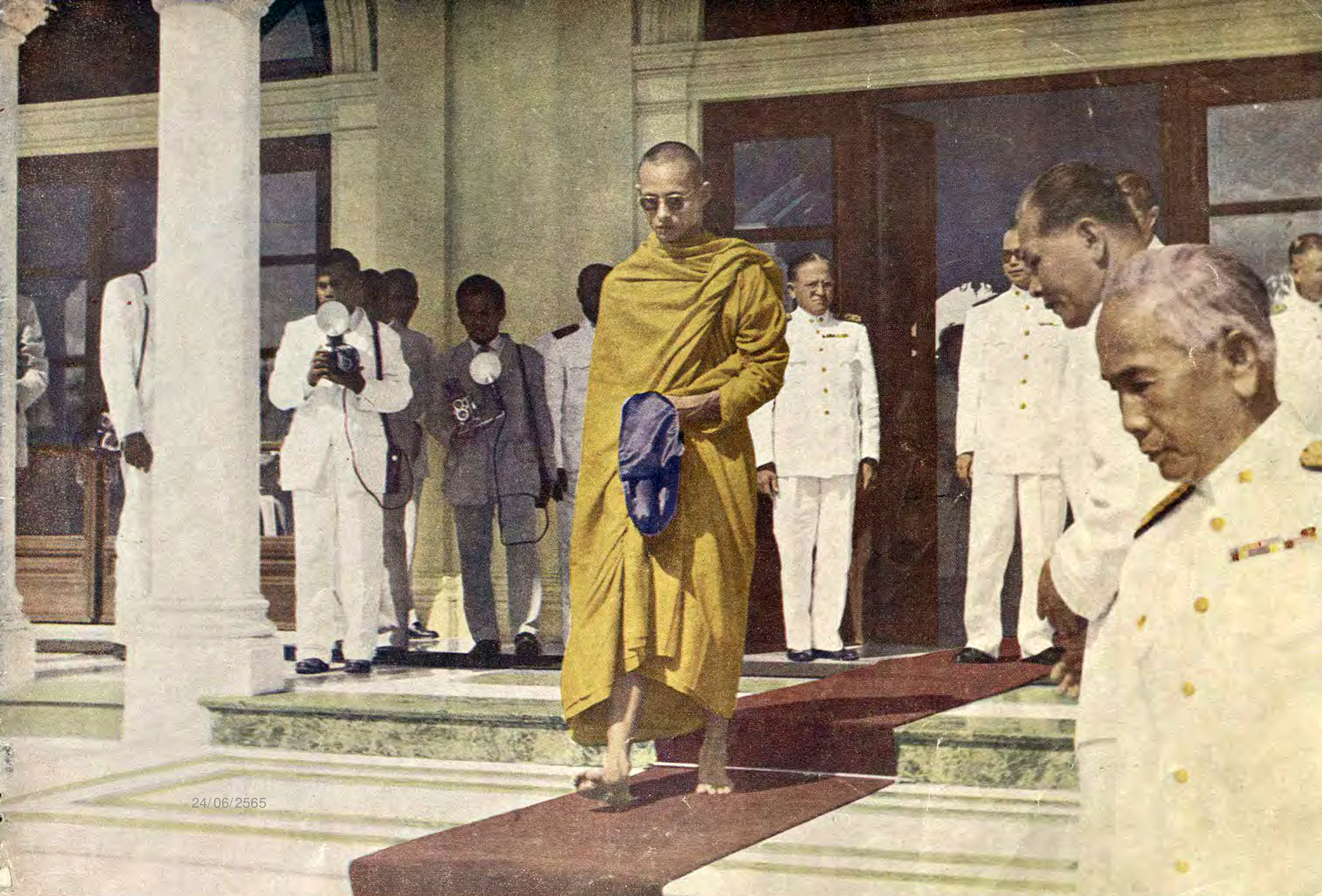
Bhumibol during his monkhood, visiting the Government House to ask for alms on 31 October 1956. Prime Minister Plaek Phibunsongkhram is on the right.

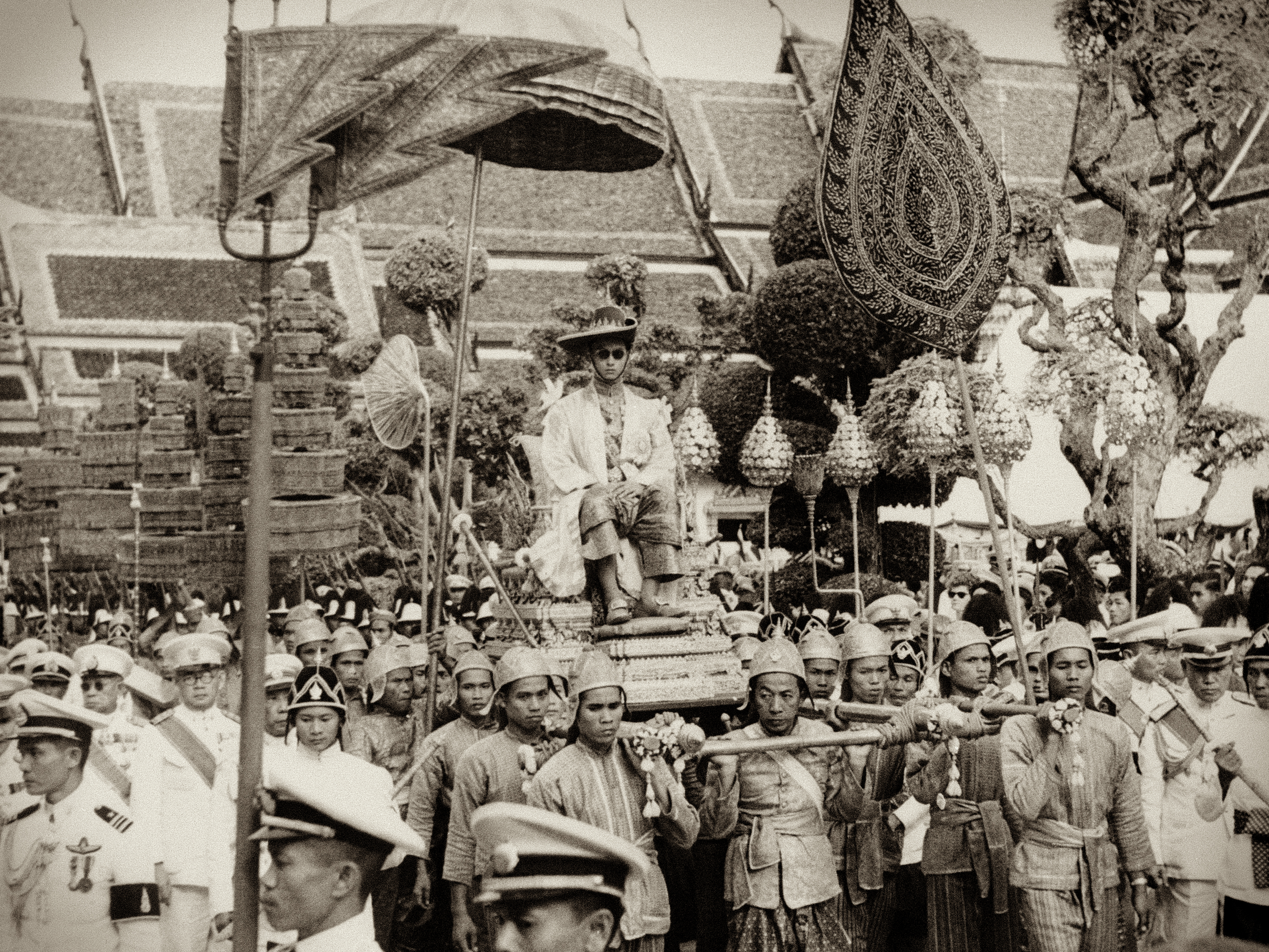
The procession of the coronation in 1950

After presiding over the long-delayed, ceremonial cremation of his brother Ananda Mahidol, Bhumibol was crowned King of Thailand on 5 May 1950 in the Phaisan Thaksin Throne Hall in the Grand Palace in Bangkok. It was the first coronation ceremony of a Thai sovereign to rule under the system of constitutional monarchy. During the ceremony, he pledged that he would "reign with righteousness for the benefit and happiness of the Siamese people". (Note: Thai: เราจะครองแผ่นดินโดยธรรม เพื่อประโยชน์สุขแห่งมหาชนชาวสยาม) Notable elements associated with the coronation included the Phatharabit Throne beneath the Great White Umbrella of State and royal regalia and utensils.

In 1950, on Coronation Day, Bhumibol's consort was made queen (Somdet Phra Boromma Rajini). The date of his coronation is celebrated each 5 May in Thailand as Coronation Day, a public holiday.

The royal couple spent their honeymoon at Hua Hin before they returned to Switzerland, where the king completed his university studies. They returned to Thailand in 1951.

Following the death of his grandmother Queen Savang Vadhana, Bhumibol entered a 15-day monkhood (22 October 1956 – 5 November 1956) at Wat Bowonniwet, as is customary for Buddhist males on the death of elder relatives. He was ordained by the Supreme Patriarch on 22 October 1956 at the Royal Chapel of the Emerald Buddha in the Grand Palace. At this time, Sirikit was appointed his regent. She was later appointed Queen Regent (Somdet Phra Boromma Rajininat) in recognition of this.

Although Bhumibol was sometimes referred to as King Rama IX in English, Thais referred to him as Nai Luang (Note: Thai: ในหลวง) or Phra Chao Yu Hua, (Note: Thai: พระเจ้าอยู่หัว) which translated to "the King" and "Lord Upon our Heads", respectively. He was also called Chao Chiwit ("Lord of Life"). Formally, he was referred to as Phrabat Somdet Phra Chao Yu Hua (Note: Thai: พระบาทสมเด็จพระเจ้าอยู่หัว) or, in legal documents, Phrabat Somdet Phra Paraminthara Maha Bhumibol Adulyadej, (Note: Thai: พระบาทสมเด็จพระปรมินทรมหาภูมิพลอดุลยเดช) and in English as "His Majesty King Bhumibol Adulyadej". He signed his name as ภูมิพลอดุลยเดช ป.ร. (Bhumibol Adulyadej Por Ror, the Thai equivalent of "Bhumibol Adulyadej R[ex])".

== Role in Thai politics ==
In 1957, a military coup overthrew the government of Field Marshal Plaek Phibunsongkhram with allegations of lèse-majesté, corruption and manipulation of the election held earlier that year. This began a new and long-lasting relationship between the monarch and military, leading some to perceive that the king condones the Thammasat University massacre in defense of his throne, and support a series of military dictatorships. However, during his interview given to the BBC in 1979, the king reiterated that the monarchy should remain impartial and be in peaceful co-existence with everybody. Bhumibol invited public criticism in a 2005 speech, but the lèse majesté laws have not been revoked by the Thai parliament yet.

=== Plaek Phibunsongkhram era ===
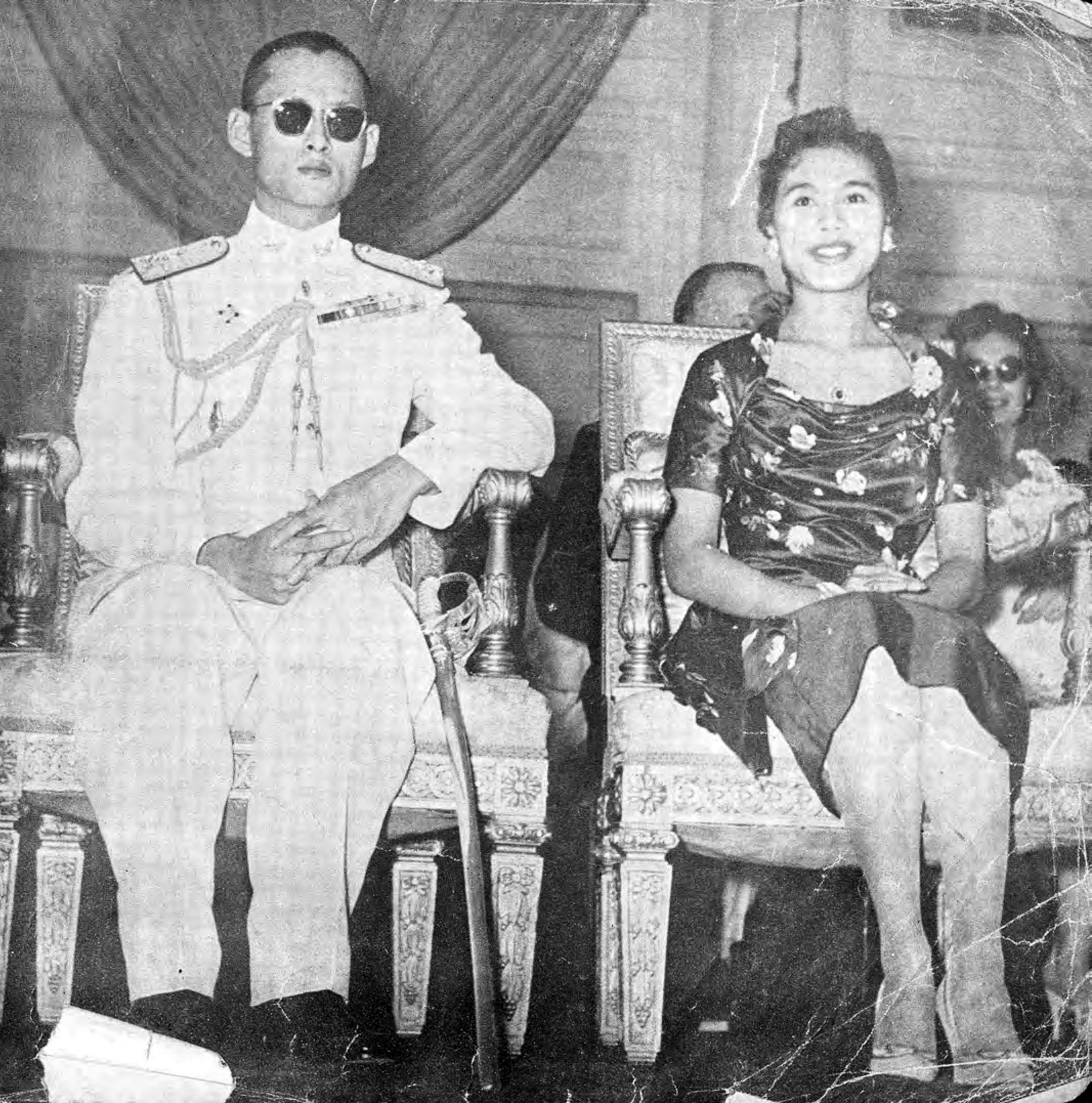
King Bhumibol with Queen Sirikit attending the Red Cross Fair in Bangkok on 9 November 1956

In the early years of his reign, during the government of military dictator Plaek Phibunsongkhram, Bhumibol had no real political power and was little more than a ceremonial figure under the military-dominated government. In August 1957, six months after parliamentary elections, General Sarit Thanarat accused the government of Field Marshal Phibunsongkhram of lèse-majesté due to its conduct of the 2,500th anniversary celebration of Buddhism. On 16 September 1957, Phibunsongkhram went to Bhumibol to seek support for his government. Bhumibol advised the field marshal to resign to avoid a coup. Phibunsongkhram refused. That evening, Sarit Thanarat seized power. Two hours later Bhumibol imposed martial law throughout the kingdom. Bhumibol issued a proclamation appointing Sarit as "military defender of the capital" without anyone countersigning the proclamation. It included the following:

Whereas it appears that the public administration by the government under the premiership of Field Marshal P. Phibunsongkhram is untrustworthy, and that the government could not maintain the public order; and whereas the military, led by Field Marshal Sarit Thanarat, has successfully taken over the public administration and now acts as the Military Defender of the Capital; now, therefore, I do hereby appoint Field Marshal Sarit Thanarat as the Military Defender of the Capital, and command that all the citizens shall remain calm whilst all the government officers shall serve the orders issued by Field Marshal Sarit Thanarat. This Proclamation shall come into force immediately. Done this 16th Day of September, Buddhist Era 2500 (1957).

Sarit later admitted in a rare interview with foreign correspondent that the king had no involvement and did not acknowledge anything about the coup until it had been done successfully.

=== Sarit Thanarat era ===
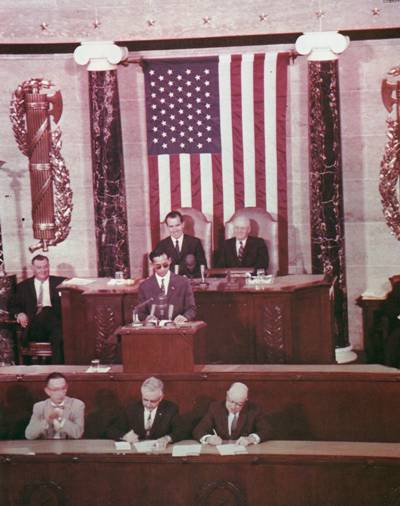
Bhumibol addresses a joint session of the United States Congress, 29 June 1960

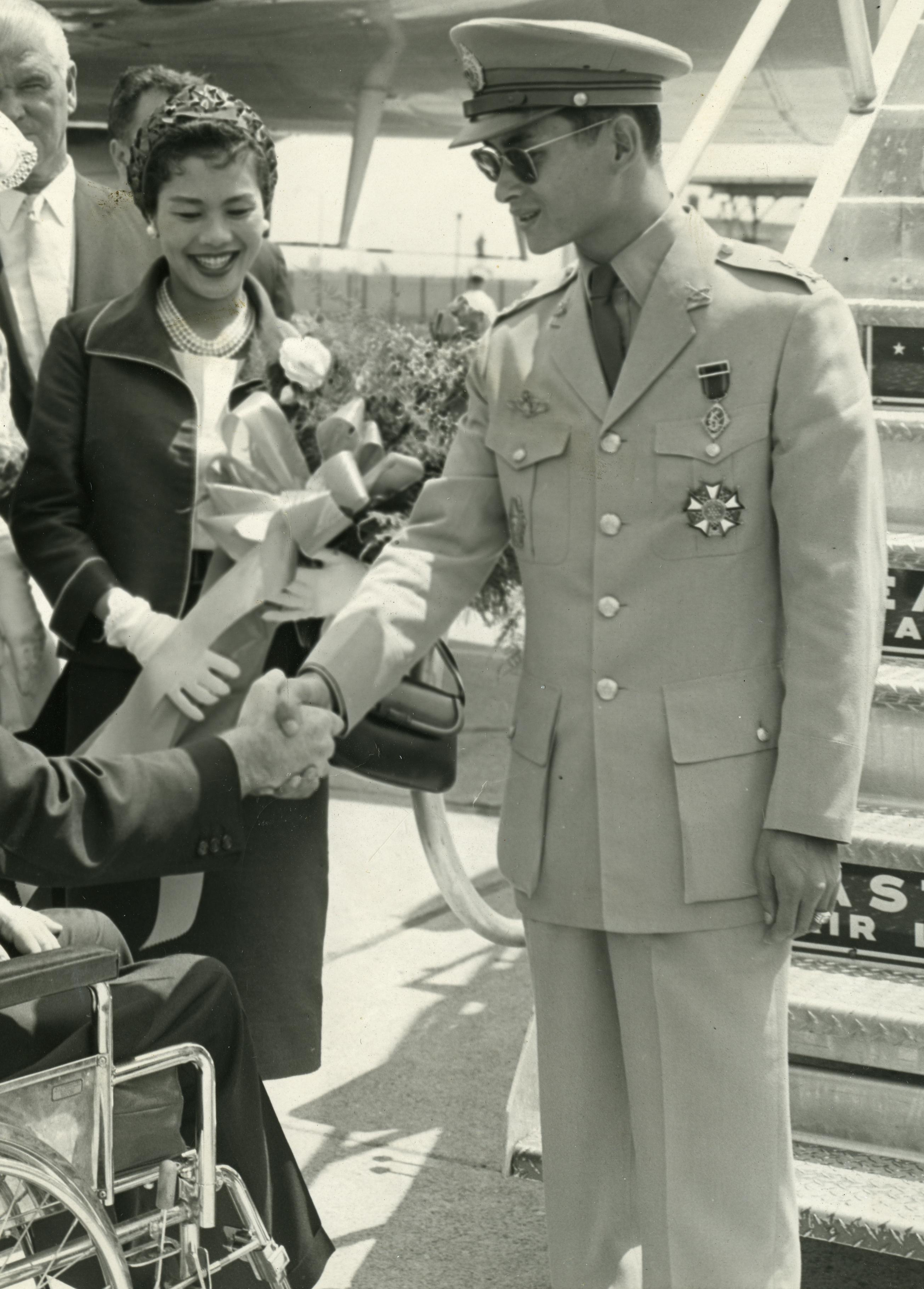
King Bhumibol in Royal Thai Army dress in 1960 and is decorated with the Honourable Order of Rama and Legion of Merit

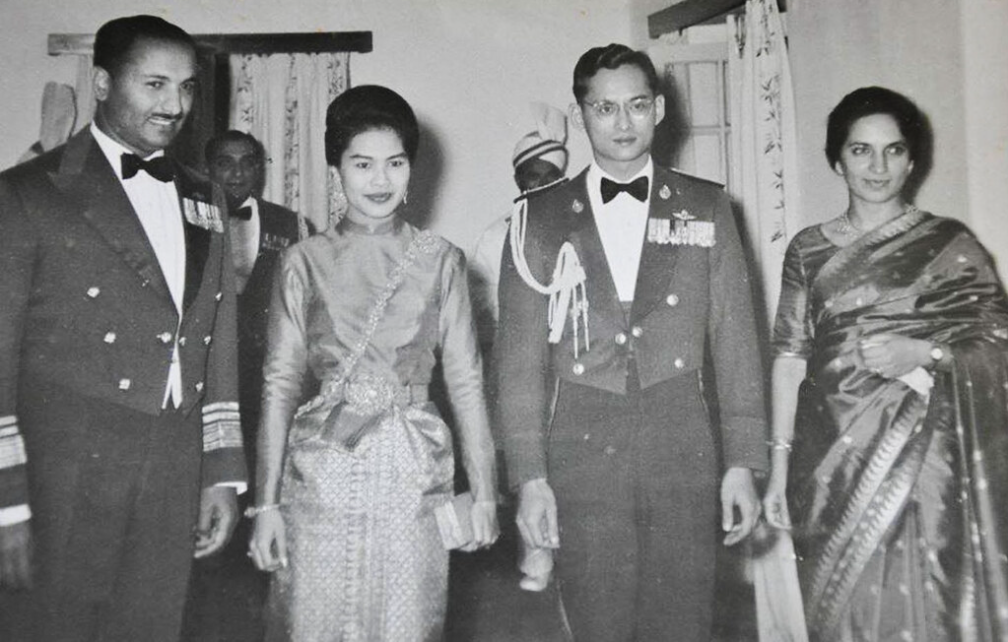
Air Marshal Asghar Khan, Queen Sirikit, King Bhumibol, and Khan's wife Amina Shamsie at a banquet in PAF Officer's Mess, Peshawar, 1962.

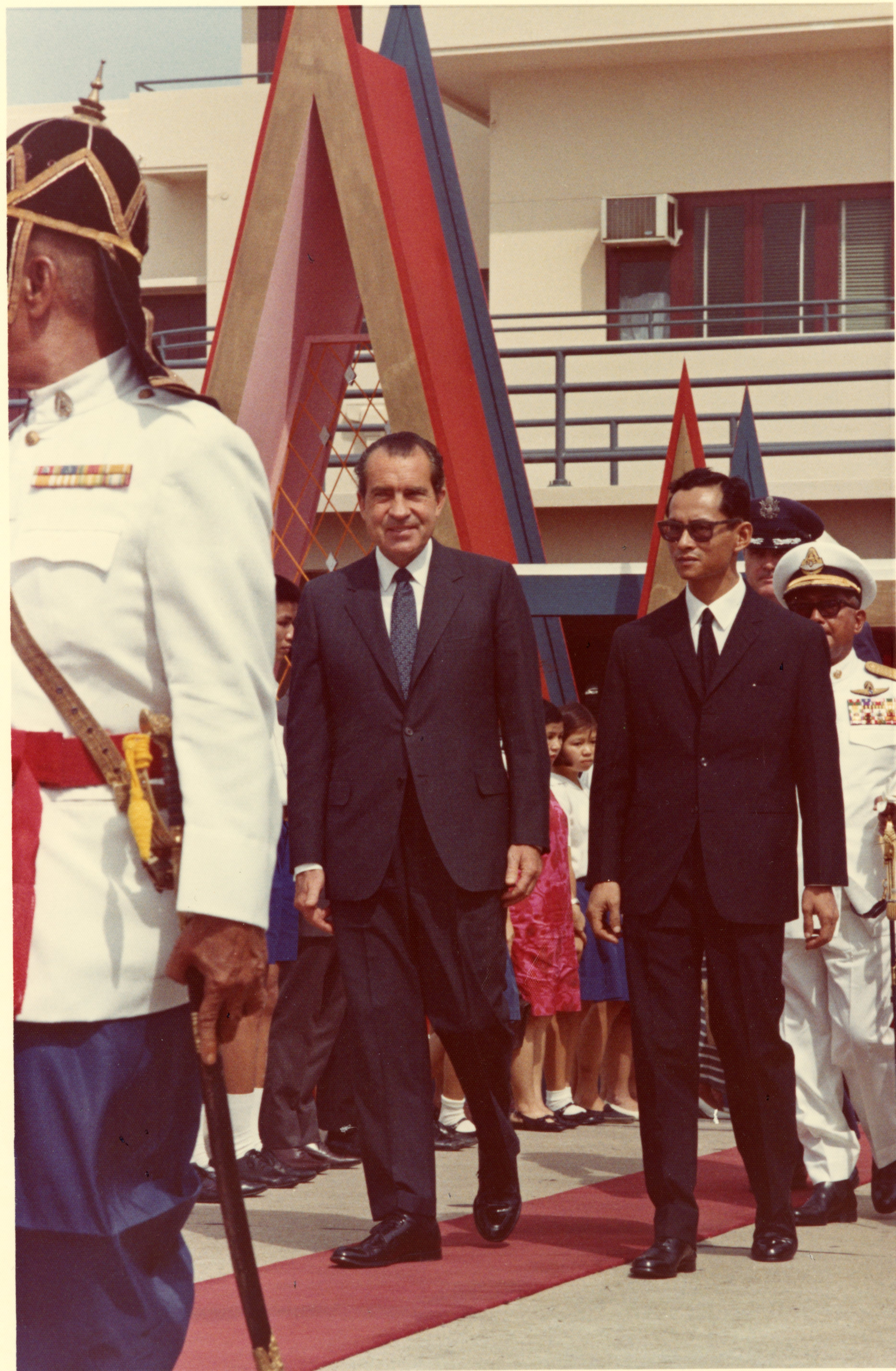
King Bhumibol with President Richard Nixon in 1969

During Sarit's dictatorship, the monarchy was revitalised. Bhumibol attended public ceremonies, toured the provinces and patronised development projects, he also visited the United States in June 1960, addressing Congress, and many countries in Europe, including a visit to Rome, hosted by PM Giovanni Gronchi, in September 1960.

Under Sarit, the practice of crawling in front of royalty during audiences, banned by King Chulalongkorn, was revived in certain situations and the royal-sponsored Thammayut Nikaya order was revitalised. For the first time since the absolute monarchy was overthrown, a king was conveyed up the Chao Phraya River in a Royal Barge Procession to offer robes at temples.

Other disused ceremonies from the classical period of the Chakri Dynasty, such as the royally patronised ploughing ceremony (Thai: พิธีพืชมงคล), were also revived. Bhumibol's birthday (5 December) was declared the national day, replacing the previous national day, the anniversary of the Siamese revolution of 1932 (24 June). Upon Sarit's death on 8 December 1963, an unprecedented 21 days of mourning were declared in the palace. A royal five-tier umbrella shaded his body while it lay in state. Long-time royal adviser Phraya Srivisaravacha later noted that no Prime Minister ever had such an intimate relationship with Bhumibol as Sarit.

Bhumibol biographer Paul Handley, in The King Never Smiles, writes that the dictator Sarit was Bhumibol's tool. Political scientist Thak Chaloemtiarana writes that Sarit used Bhumibol in order to build his own credibility.

=== Thammasat University massacre ===
Following Sarit's death General Thanom Kittikachorn rose to power to lead Thailand's military dictatorship, ultimately challenged by the 1973 Thai popular uprising. Bhumibol initially asked student protestors to disband. When police attacked and killed dozens of students, sparking protest riots, Bhumibol announced general Thanom's resignation and departure from Thailand. According to William Stevenson, the king had asked the three tyrants to avoid bloodshed; although the three tyrants had agreed, they later changed their minds. Eventually, it led to the incidents of October 1973.

Bhumibol distanced himself from the Thai military after Thanom's fall. Political events in Vietnam, Cambodia and Laos brought powerful guerrilla and communist movements into power or prominence, which threatened the Thai monarchy and political establishment. Fearing unrest, Bhumibol began to court the military in 1975, visiting camps throughout the country, and publicly warning of internal and external threats. At this time, Bhumibol increasingly cultivated far-right militias and paramilitary forces, including the Red Gaurs and the Village Scouts, warning that students and political dissidents planned to bring communists to power in Thailand. Finally, Bhumibol provoked outrage among students and legal groups by inviting general Thanom back into the country.

The ensuing chaos was used as a pretext for a military coup, which Bhumibol backed and described as a manifestation of the people's will. The event that catalyzed the coup was the Thammasat University massacre, carried out in the name of defending Bhumibol's throne. The victorious military junta submitted three names to the king as possible premiers: Deputy President of the king's Privy Council Prakob Hutasingh, right-wing Bangkok Governor Thammanoon Thien-ngern, and staunchly anti-communist Supreme Court judge Thanin Kraivichien. Bhumibol chose Thanin as the most suitable premier, leading student protesters to flee to join the communists in the jungle. Thanin was overthrown in a military coup in October 1977 led by General Kriangsak Chamanan.

=== Prem Tinsulanonda era ===
Kriangsak was succeeded in 1980 by the popular Army Commander-in-Chief, General Prem Tinsulanonda, who later became the Privy Council President.

Bhumibol's refusal to endorse military coups in April 1981 and September 1985 ultimately led to the victory of forces loyal to the government, despite some violence – including, in 1981, the seizure of Bangkok by rebel forces. The coups led many to believe that Bhumibol had misjudged Thai society and that his credibility as an impartial mediator between various political and military factions had been compromised.

In 1989, Bhumibol became the world's longest-reigning living monarch following the deaths of Emperor Hirohito of Japan and Franz Joseph II, Prince of Liechtenstein.

=== 1992 crisis ===
Royal intervention on the night of 20 May. Chamlong Srimuang (left) and Suchinda Kraprayoon (middle) submit to the King (seated)

In 1992, Bhumibol played a key role in Thailand's transition to a democratic system. The 1991 Thai coup d'état on 23 February returned Thailand to military dictatorship. After a general election in 1992, the majority parties invited General Suchinda Kraprayoon, a leader of the coup group, to be prime minister. This caused much dissent, which escalated into demonstrations called Black May that led to a large number of deaths when the military was brought in to control protesters. The situation became increasingly critical as police and military forces clashed with protesters. Violence and riots spread to many areas of the capital with rumours of a rift among the armed forces.

Amidst the fear of civil war, Bhumibol intervened. He summoned Suchinda and the leader of the pro-democracy movement, retired Major General Chamlong Srimuang, to a televised audience, and urged them to find a peaceful resolution. At the height of the crisis, the sight of both men appearing together on their knees (in accordance with royal protocol) made a strong impression on the nation. Bhumibol then signed Suchinda's amnesty decree that applied to both sides of the conflict, with the reason to protect security and unity of the country. Suchinda resigned soon afterwards.

It was one of the few occasions in which Bhumibol directly and publicly intervened in a political conflict. A general election was held shortly afterward, leading to a civilian government.

=== 2005–2006 crisis ===
Weeks before the April 2006 legislative election, the Democrat Party-led opposition and the People's Alliance for Democracy petitioned Bhumibol to appoint a replacement prime minister and cabinet. Demands for royal intervention were met with much criticism from the public. Bhumibol, in a speech on 26 April 2006, responded, "Asking for a Royally-appointed prime minister is undemocratic. It is, pardon me, a mess. It is irrational".

After publicly claiming victory in the boycotted April parliamentary elections, Thaksin Shinawatra had a private audience with the king. A few hours later, Thaksin appeared on national television to announce that he would be taking a break from politics. Due to the election result, Bhumibol took the unprecedented step of calling the elections undemocratic.

In May 2006, the Sondhi Limthongkul-owned Manager Daily newspaper published a series of articles describing the "Finland Plot", alleging that Thaksin and former members of the Communist Party of Thailand planned to overthrow the king and seize control of the nation. No evidence was ever produced to verify the existence of such a plot, and Thaksin and his Thai Rak Thai party vehemently denied the accusations and sued the accusers.

In a rare, televised speech to senior judges, Bhumibol requested the judiciary to take action to resolve the political crisis. On 8 May 2006, the Constitutional Court invalidated the results of the April elections and ordered new elections scheduled for 15 October 2006. The Criminal Court later jailed the Election Commissioners.

On 14 July, Privy Council President Prem Tinsulanonda addressed graduating cadets of the Chulachomklao Royal Military Academy, telling them that the Thai military must serve the nation and the king—not the government.

On 20 July, Bhumibol signed a royal decree calling new House elections for 15 October 2006. In an unprecedented act, the King wrote a note on the royal decree calling for a clean and fair election. Bhumibol also underwent spinal surgery that day.

=== 60th anniversary celebrations ===
A series of celebrations marking the 60th anniversary of Bhumibol's accession were held in June 2006. Events included a royal barge procession on the Chao Phraya River, fireworks displays, art exhibitions, and the pardoning of 25,000 prisoners, concerts, and dance performances.

Tied in with the anniversary, United Nations Secretary-General Kofi Annan presented Bhumibol with the United Nations Development Programme's first Human Development Lifetime Achievement Award on 26 May 2006. National holidays were observed on 9 June and 12–13 June 2006. On 9 June, the king and queen appeared on the balcony of Ananta Samakhom Throne Hall before hundreds of thousands of people. The official royal barge procession on 12 June was attended by the king and queen and royal visitors from 26 other countries. On 13 June, a state banquet for the royal visitors was held in the newly constructed Rama IX Throne Hall at the Grand Palace, the first official function of the hall. The Chiang Mai Royal Floral Expo was also held to honour the anniversary.

=== 2006 coup ===
On the evening of 19 September, the Thai military overthrew the Thaksin government and seized control of Bangkok in a bloodless coup. The junta, led by Sonthi Boonyaratglin, Commander of the Army, called itself the Council for Democratic Reform under the Constitutional Monarchy. It accused the deposed prime minister and his regime of crimes, including lèse majesté, and pledged its loyalty to Bhumibol. Martial law was declared, the constitution repealed and the October elections cancelled. Protests and political meetings were banned.

The king's role in the coup was the subject of much speculation among Thai analysts and the international media, although publication of such speculation was banned in Thailand. The king had an audience with Privy Council President Prem Tinsulanonda at the same time that special forces troops were mobilised. Anti-coup protesters claimed that Prem was the mastermind of the coup, although the military claimed otherwise and banned any discussion of the topic. In a BBC interview, Thitinan Pongsudhirak of Chulalongkorn University noted, "This coup was nothing short of Thaksin versus the King ... He [the king] is widely seen as having implicitly endorsed the coup." In the same interview, social critic Sulak Sivaraksa claimed, "Without his [the king's] involvement, the coup would have been impossible." Sulak added that the king is "very skillful. He never becomes obviously involved. If this coup goes wrong, Sonthi will get the blame, but whatever happens, the King will only get praise." The junta later warned it would "urgently retaliate against foreign reporters whose coverage has been deemed insulting to the monarchy." Prem did help secure the appointment of Surayud Chulanont, another member of the King's Privy Council, as Premier, and allegedly had a say in the appointment of Surayud's Cabinet. Critics claimed the cabinet was full of "Prem's boys".

The junta appointed a constitutional tribunal to rule on alleged polling fraud involving the Thai Rak Thai and Democrat political parties. Guilty rulings would have dissolved both parties, Thailand's largest and oldest, respectively, and banned the parties' leadership from politics for five years. The weeks leading up to the verdicts saw rising political tensions. On 24 May 2007, about a week before the scheduled verdict, Bhumibol gave a rare speech to the Supreme Administrative Court (the president of which is also a member of the constitutional tribunal). "You have the responsibility to prevent the country from collapsing", he warned them in the speech, which was shown on all national television channels simultaneously during the evening. "The nation needs political parties ... In my mind, I have a judgment but I cannot say", he said. "Either way the ruling goes, it will be bad for the country, there will be mistakes". The tribunal later acquitted the Democrat Party, but dissolved the Thai Rak Thai Party and banned 111 of its executives from politics for five years.

The junta-appointed Constitution Drafting Assembly later tried to use the King in a propaganda campaign to increase public support for its widely criticised draft constitution. The CDA placed billboards saying "Love the King. Care about the King. Vote in the referendum" throughout northeast Thailand, where opposition to the junta was greatest.

On 20 April 2009, Thaksin claimed in an interview with the Financial Times that Bhumibol had been briefed by Privy Councillors Prem Tinsulanonda and Surayud Chulanont about their plans to stage the 2006 coup. He claimed that General Panlop Pinmanee, a leader of the People's Alliance for Democracy, had told him of the briefing. The Thai embassy in London denied Thaksin's claims.

=== 2008 crisis ===
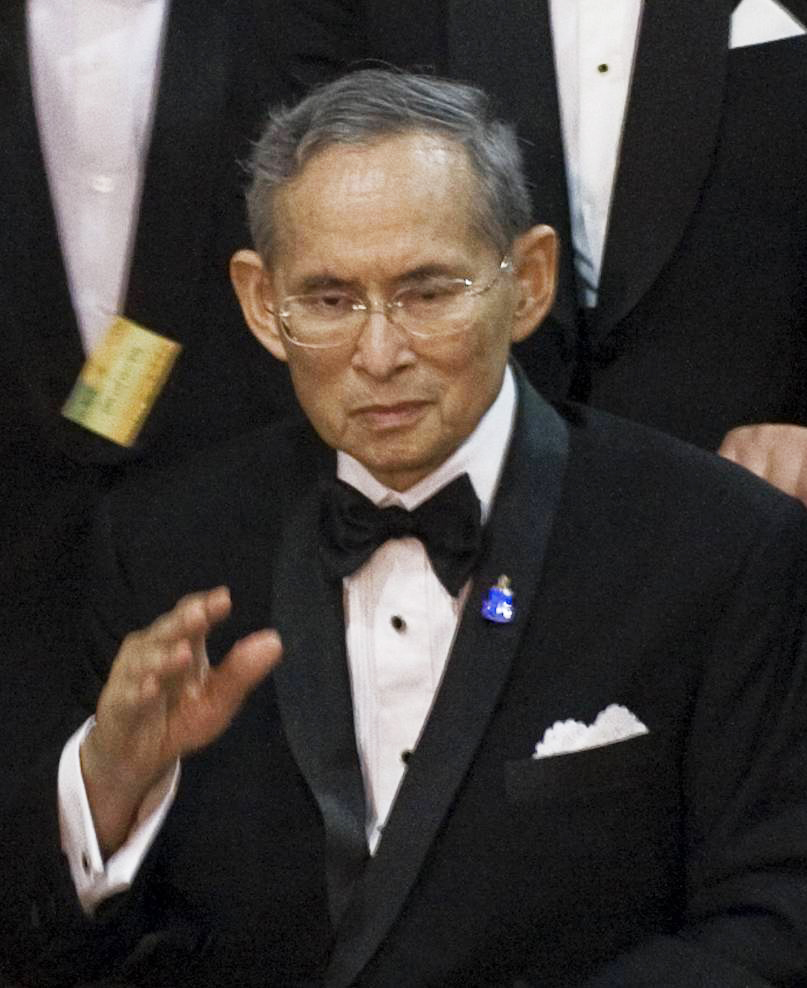
King Bhumibol Adulyadej in 2010

The military's constitution passed the referendum, and a general election was held in December 2007. The People's Power Party (PPP), consisting of many former Thai Rak Thai Party MPs and supporters, won the majority and formed a government. The People's Alliance for Democracy (PAD) refused to accept the election results and started protests, eventually laying siege to Government House, Don Mueang Airport, and Suvarnabhumi Airport. Although the PAD claimed they were defending the monarchy, Bhumibol remained silent. However, after a PAD supporter died in a clash with police, Queen Sirikit presided over her cremation. Princess Sirindhorn, when asked at a US press conference whether PAD was acting on behalf of the monarchy, replied, "I don't think so. They do things for themselves." Questioning and criticism over Bhumibol's role in the crisis increased, particularly from the international press. "It is more and more difficult for them to hold the illusion that the monarchy is universally adored", says a Thai academic.

In April 2008, Bhumibol appointed alleged coup plotter General Surayud Chulanont to the Privy Council of Thailand. In the weeks leading up to the 2011 general election, Bhumibol appointed Air Chief Marshal Chalit Pukbhasuk, a leader of the 2006 military coup, to his privy council.

=== 2013–2014 crisis and coup ===
On 22 May 2014, Prayut Chan-o-cha, Commander of the Royal Thai Army launched a coup d'état, the 12th since the country's first coup in 1932, against the caretaker government, following six months of political crisis. On 24 May 2014, the National Council for Peace and Order (NCPO) said Bhumibol had acknowledged the coup, but stopped short of describing the response as an endorsement. However, two days later, he formally appointed General Prayut to run the country. In Thailand the monarchy is highly respected and royal endorsement was seen as a legitimization of the takeover.

Paul Chambers, writing in The New York Times, said that the military was the only institution that could sustain the power of the monarchy, and that the most recent two coups showed a relationship between the military and the monarch as Bhumibol gave an endorsement to each of them.

== Declining health ==
Bhumibol suffered from lumbar spinal stenosis, and received a microsurgical decompression for the condition in July 2006. He was admitted to the hospital in October 2007 and diagnosed with a blood shortage to his brain. He received treatment for various ailments including heart problems and was released after three weeks.

Bhumibol was again admitted to Siriraj Hospital in September 2009, apparently suffering from flu and pneumonia. In 2011, it was revealed as part of WikiLeaks' leak of United States diplomatic cables that he had suffered from Parkinson's disease and depression. He was diagnosed with diverticulitis in hospital in November 2011, and was treated for the condition in January 2012. Bhumibol suffered minute subdural bleeding in the left frontal area of his brain for which he was treated in July 2012. Bhumibol left the hospital in July 2013, and travelled to Klai Kangwon Palace at Hua Hin on 2 August 2013, but returned intermittently in the following years, most recently on 1 June 2015.

Bhumibol was too ill to appear for the public celebration of his birthday on 5 December 2015, but made a televised appearance on 14 December, his first in several months. The king temporarily left hospital for a brief visit to Chitralada Royal Villa on 11 January 2016. In February, he developed a high fever due to sepsis, which improved following antibiotics treatment. In October, the king developed organ failure owing to hypotension and became dependent on hemodialysis due to kidney failure.

== Death ==
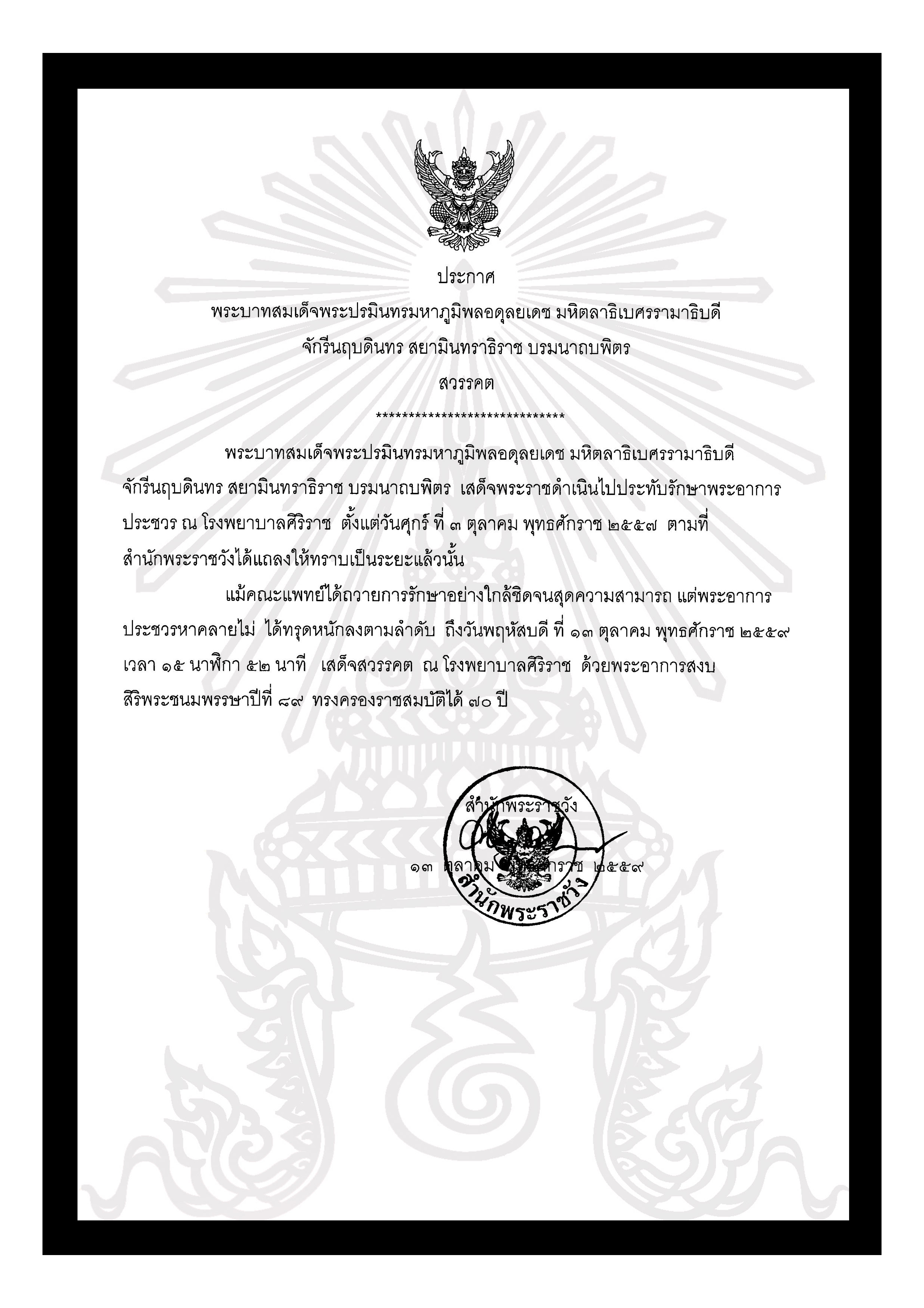
Bureau of the Royal Household announcement of King Bhumibol Adulyadej's death, 13 October 2016

Bhumibol died aged 88 at Siriraj Hospital in Bangkok on 13 October 2016, at 15:52 local time, as announced by the royal palace later that day. The following day, his body was taken by motorcade to the Grand Palace for the customary bathing rite. Thousands of the bereaved public lined the route, demonstrating their affection for their "king of kings". The royal procession arrived at the Grand Palace through Viset Chaisri Gate at 17:00. His only son and the next in line to rule the kingdom, Crown Prince Maha Vajiralongkorn, presided over the bathing ritual at Phiman Rattaya Throne Hall.

A royal cremation ceremony took place over five days at the end of October 2017. The actual cremation, which was not broadcast on television, was held in the late evening of 26 October 2017. Following cremation his ashes were taken to the Grand Palace and were enshrined at the Chakri Maha Phasat Throne Hall (royal remains), the Royal Cemetery at Wat Ratchabophit and the Wat Bowonniwet Vihara Royal Temple (royal ashes). Following burial, the mourning period officially ended on midnight of 30 October 2017, after which Thais resumed wearing regular colours while they awaited the future coronation of King Vajiralongkorn, which was hosted between 4–6 May 2019.

== Royal powers ==
=== Constitutional powers ===
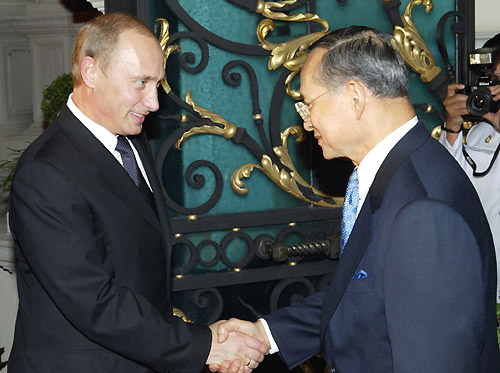
King Bhumibol with Russian president Vladimir Putin in 2003

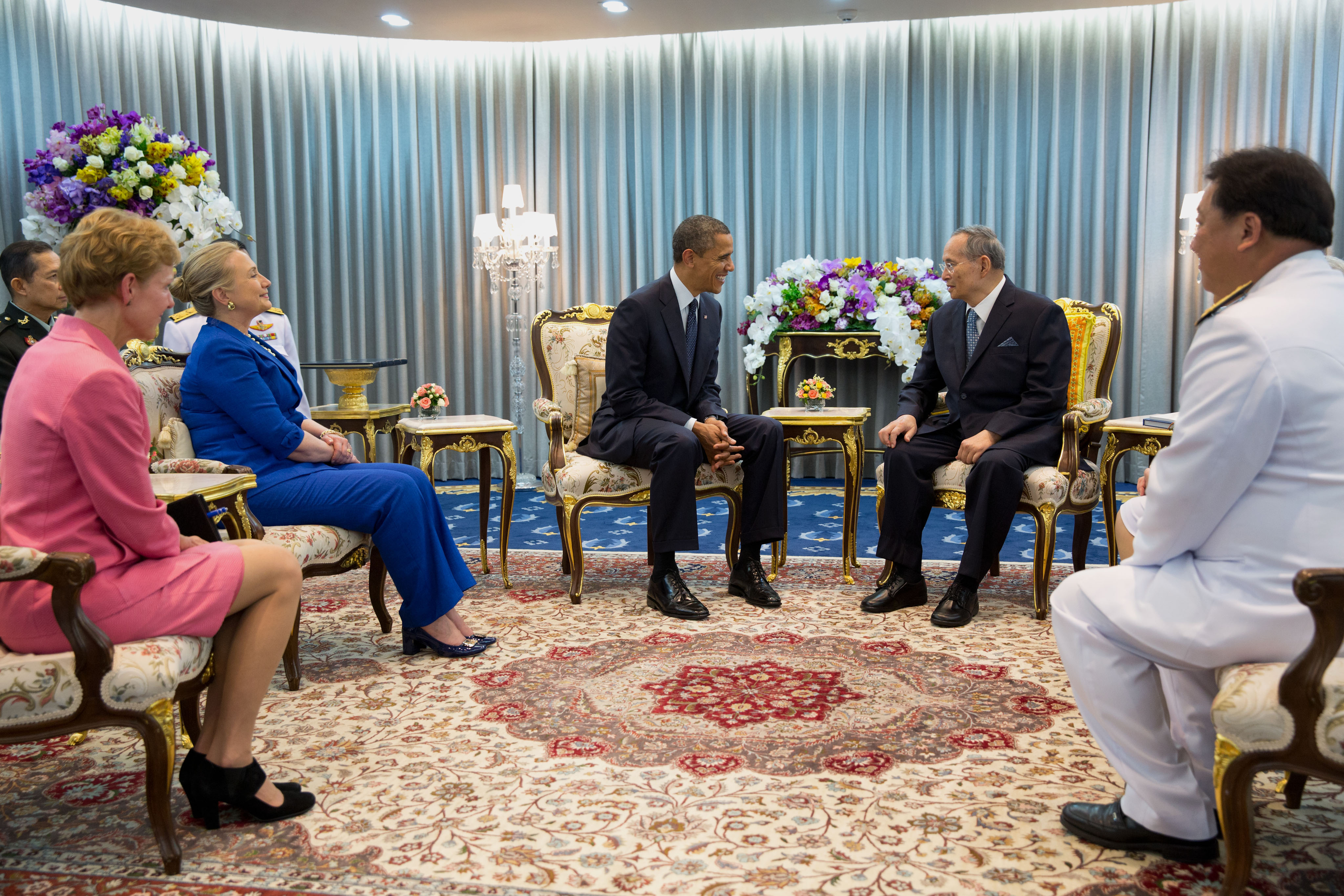
Bhumibol in a meeting with US president Barack Obama in 2012

Bhumibol retained enormous powers, partly because of his immense popularity and partly because his powers – although clearly defined in the Thai constitution – were often subject to conflicting interpretations. This was highlighted by the controversy surrounding the appointment of Jaruvan Maintaka as Auditor-General. Jaruvan had been appointed by The State Audit Commission, but in July 2004, the Constitutional Court ruled that her appointment was unconstitutional. Jaruvan refused to vacate her office without an explicit order from Bhumibol, on the grounds that she had previously been royally approved. When the Senate elected a replacement for Jaruvan, Bhumibol refused to approve him. The Senate declined to vote to override Bhumibol's veto. Finally in February 2006 the Audit Commission reinstated Jaruvan when it became clear from a memo from the Office of the King's Principal Private Secretary that King Bhumibol supported her appointment. Bhumibol only vetoed legislation on rare occasions. In 1976, when the Parliament voted 149–19 to extend democratic elections down to district levels, Bhumibol refused to sign the law. The Parliament refused to vote to overturn the King's veto. In 1954, Bhumibol vetoed parliamentary-approved land reform legislation twice before consenting to sign it. The law limited the maximum land an individual could hold to 50 rai (80,000 square metres (860,000 sq ft)), at a time when the Crown Property Bureau was the kingdom's largest land-owner. The law was not enforced as General Sarit soon overthrew the elected government in a coup and repealed the law.

Bhumibol had the constitutional prerogative to pardon criminals, although there are several criteria for receiving a pardon, including age and remaining sentence. The 2006 pardoning of several convicted child rapists, including an Australian rapist and child pornographer, caused controversy. However, under the Thai constitution, the king has the prerogative to grant pardons and all laws, royal rescripts, and royal commands relating to state affairs must be countersigned by a minister unless otherwise provided for in the constitution.

=== Network monarchy and extraconstitutional powers ===
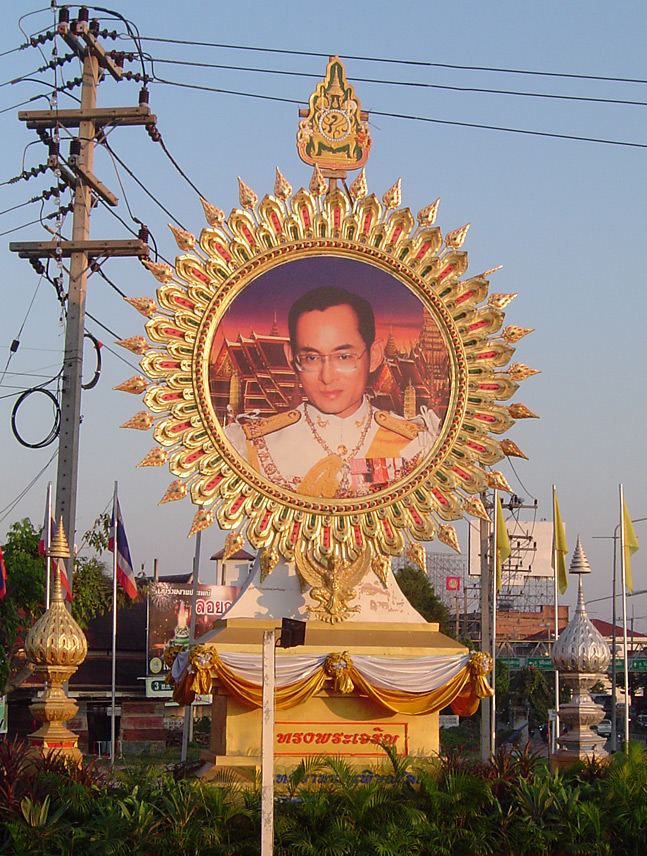
City decoration in observance of King Bhumibol's birthday in Phitsanulok, Thailand

Several academics outside Thailand, including Duncan McCargo and Federico Ferrara, noted the active but indirect political involvement of Bhumibol through a "network monarchy", whose most significant proxy is Privy Council President Prem Tinsulanonda. McCargo claimed that Bhumibol's conservative network worked behind the scenes to establish political influence in the 1990s, but was threatened by the landslide election victories of Thaksin Shinawatra in 2001 and 2005. Ferrara claimed, shortly before the Thai Supreme Court delivered its verdict to seize Thaksin Shinawatra's assets, that the judiciary was a well-established part of Bhumibol's network and represented his main avenue to exercise extra-constitutional prerogatives despite having the appearance of being constitutional. He also noted how, in comparison to the Constitutional Court's 2001 acquittal of Thaksin, the judiciary was a much more important part of the "network" than it was in the past.

The network's ability to exercise power is based partly on Bhumibol's popularity and strict control of Bhumibol's popular image. According to Jost Pachaly of the Heinrich Böll Foundation, Bhumibol "plays an important role behind the scenes. But the role is difficult to assess because nothing is reported about it and no one really knows anything specific", due to lese majeste laws forbidding discussion about Bhumibol's political activities. Bhumibol's popularity was demonstrated following the 2003 Phnom Penh riots in Cambodia, when hundreds of Thai protesters, enraged by rumors that Cambodian rioters had stomped on photographs of Bhumibol, gathered outside the Cambodian embassy in Bangkok. Photographs of the stomping were not published in Thailand, but were available on the internet. The situation was resolved peacefully only when Police General Sant Sarutanonda told the crowd that he had received a call from royal secretary Arsa Sarasin conveying Bhumibol's request for calm. The crowd dispersed.

== Royal projects ==
=== History ===
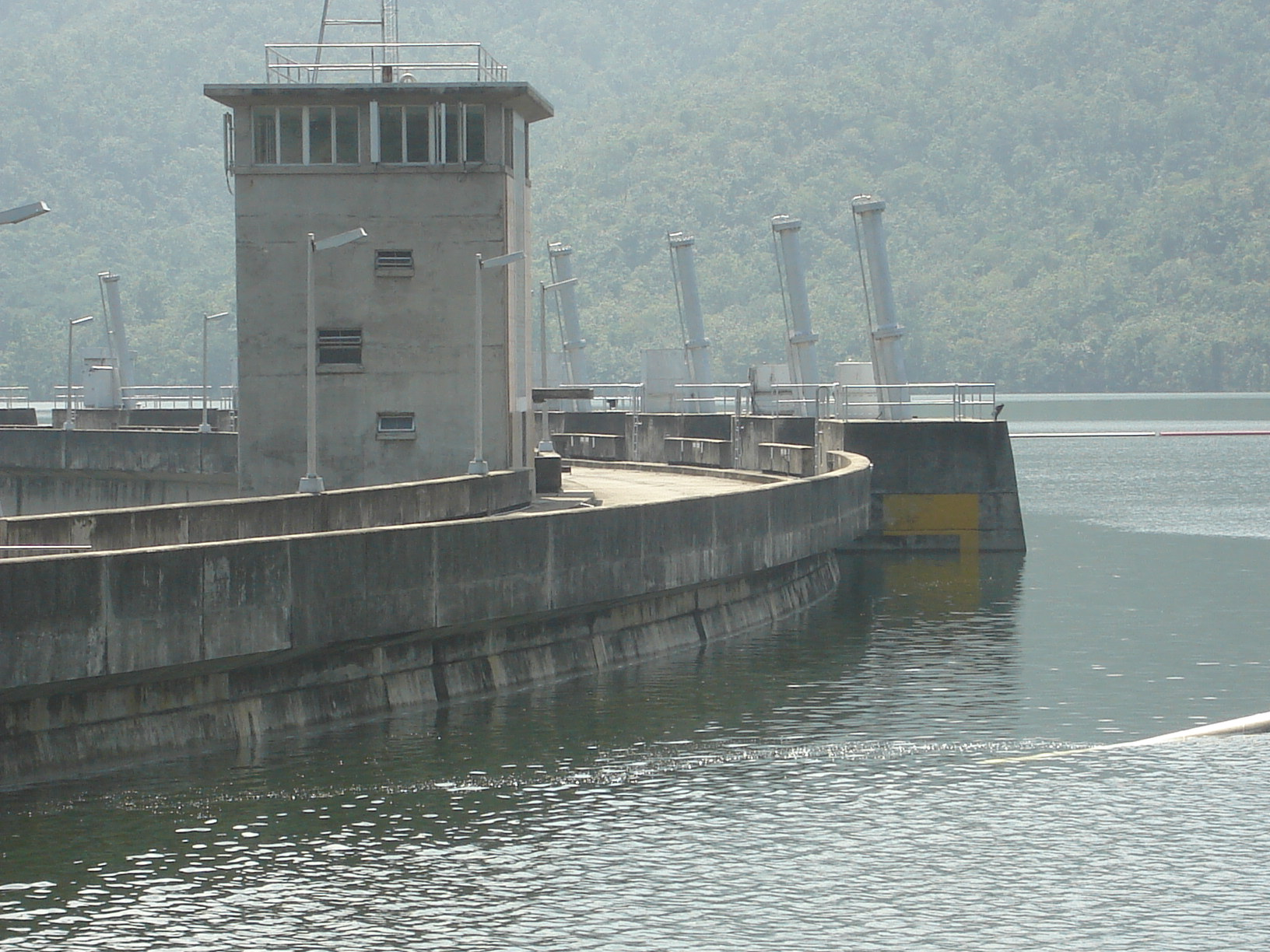
Bhumibol Dam

The development of the country must be fostered in stages. It must start with the construction of infrastructure, that is, the provision of food and basic necessities for the people by methods which are economic, cautious and conforming with principles. Once the foundation is firmly established, progress can be continually, carefully and economically promoted. This approach will prevent incurring mistakes and failures, and lead to the certain and complete achievement of the objectives.

— Bhumibol's speech at Kasetsart University Commencement Ceremony, 19 July 1974.

Bhumibol was involved in many social and economic development projects. The nature of his involvement varied by political regime.

The government of Plaek Phibunsongkhram (1951–1957) limited Bhumibol to a ceremonial role. During that period Bhumibol produced some films and operated a radio station from Chitlada Palace using personal funds.

In the military governments of Sarit Thanarat and his successors (1958–1980), Bhumibol was portrayed as the "development King" and the inspiration for the economic and political goals of the regime. Royally ordered projects were implemented under the financial and political support of the government, including projects in rural areas and communities under the influence of the Communist Party of Thailand. Bhumibol's visits to these projects were heavily promoted by the Sarit government and broadcast in state-controlled media.

During the governments of General Prem Tinsulanonda (1981–1987), the relationship between the Thai state and the monarch was at its closest. Prem, later to become President of Bhumibol's Privy Council, officially allocated government budgets and manpower to support royal projects. Most activities in this period involved the development of large-scale irrigation projects in rural areas.

During the modern period (post-1988), the structured development of the royal projects reached its apex. Bhumibol's Chaipattana Foundation was established, promoting his "sufficiency economy" theory, an alternative to the export-oriented policies adopted by the period's elected governments. Following the 2006 coup, establishment of a "sufficiency economy" was enshrined in the constitution as being a primary goal of the government, and government financial support for royal projects was boosted.

=== Project samplings ===
- 'Sandwich' and 'Supersandwich' artificial rainmaking project under the Thailand Royal Rainmaking Project
- Chai Pattana Waste Water Aerator, awarded gold medal by BKU (The Belgian Chamber of Inventors) at Brussels Eureka 2000
- 'Sufficiency economy' Theory
- New Theory of Agriculture
- Rice policy, especially increasing production and improvement of germplasm collections which continues through today. For this he received the first Borlaug Medallion in 2007.
- Use of Vetiver Grass for soil improvement, awarded the International Merit Award by the IECA (International Erosion Control Association)
- Kaem Ling Project, formation of detention basins
- Klaeng Din Project, acidic soil treatment
- Fai Maeo Project, formation of check dams
- Khun Dan Prakanchon Dam, Nakhon Nayok Province
- Pa Sak Jolasid Dam, Lop Buri Province
- Pa Sak River Basin Improvement Project
- Khlong Lat Pho Project, water diversion to prevent flooding in Bangkok
- Rama VIII Bridge
- Ratchadaphisek Road
- Bangkok Industrial Ring Road/Bhumibol Bridge
- Huai Ongkod Land Rehabilitation Project, Kanchanaburi Province
- Khao Hin Son Royal Development Study Centre, Chachoengsao Province
- Phikun Thong Royal Development Study Centre, Narathiwat Province
- Huai Sai Royal Development Study Centre, Phetchaburi Province
- Royal Medical Team. Bhumibol's private physicians accompanying him on village tours were encouraged to provide medical care for local residents. In addition, the Royal Household sends letters of support to physicians who volunteer to serve in hospitals in provinces where royal palaces are present.
- In honour of his work in soil science, the United Nations observes the king's birthday, 5 December, as World Soil Day. The first observance was in 2014.

== Private life ==
Monarchs of the Chakri dynasty
- Phutthayotfa Chulalok (Rama I)
- Phutthaloetla Naphalai (Rama II)
- Nangklao (Rama III)
- Mongkut (Rama IV)
- Chulalongkorn (Rama V)
- Vajiravudh (Rama VI)
- Prajadhipok (Rama VII)
- Ananda Mahidol (Rama VIII)
- Bhumibol Adulyadej (Rama IX)
- Vajiralongkorn (Rama X)

Bhumibol was a painter, musician, photographer, author and translator. His book Phra Mahachanok is based on a traditional Jataka story of Buddhist scripture. The Story of Thong Daeng is the story of his dog Thong Daeng.

In his youth, Bhumibol was greatly interested in firearms. He kept a carbine, a Sten gun and two automatic pistols in his bedroom, and he and his elder brother, King Ananda Mahidol, often used the gardens of the palace for target practice.

There are two English-language books that provide extensive detail—albeit not always verifiable—about Bhumibol's life, especially his early years and then throughout his entire reign. One is The Revolutionary King (2001) by William Stevenson, the other is The King Never Smiles (2006) by Paul M. Handley. A third and earlier work, The Devil's Discus (1964), is also available in Thai and English. The latter two books are banned in Thailand, while the first has never been sold in the country due to its "inaccuracies", despite having been written with royal patronage.

Bhumibol's creativity in, among other things, music, art and invention, was the focus of a two-minute long documentary created by the government of Abhisit Vejjajiva that was screened at all branches of the Major Cineplex Group and SF Cinema City, the two largest cinema chains in Thailand.

=== Music ===
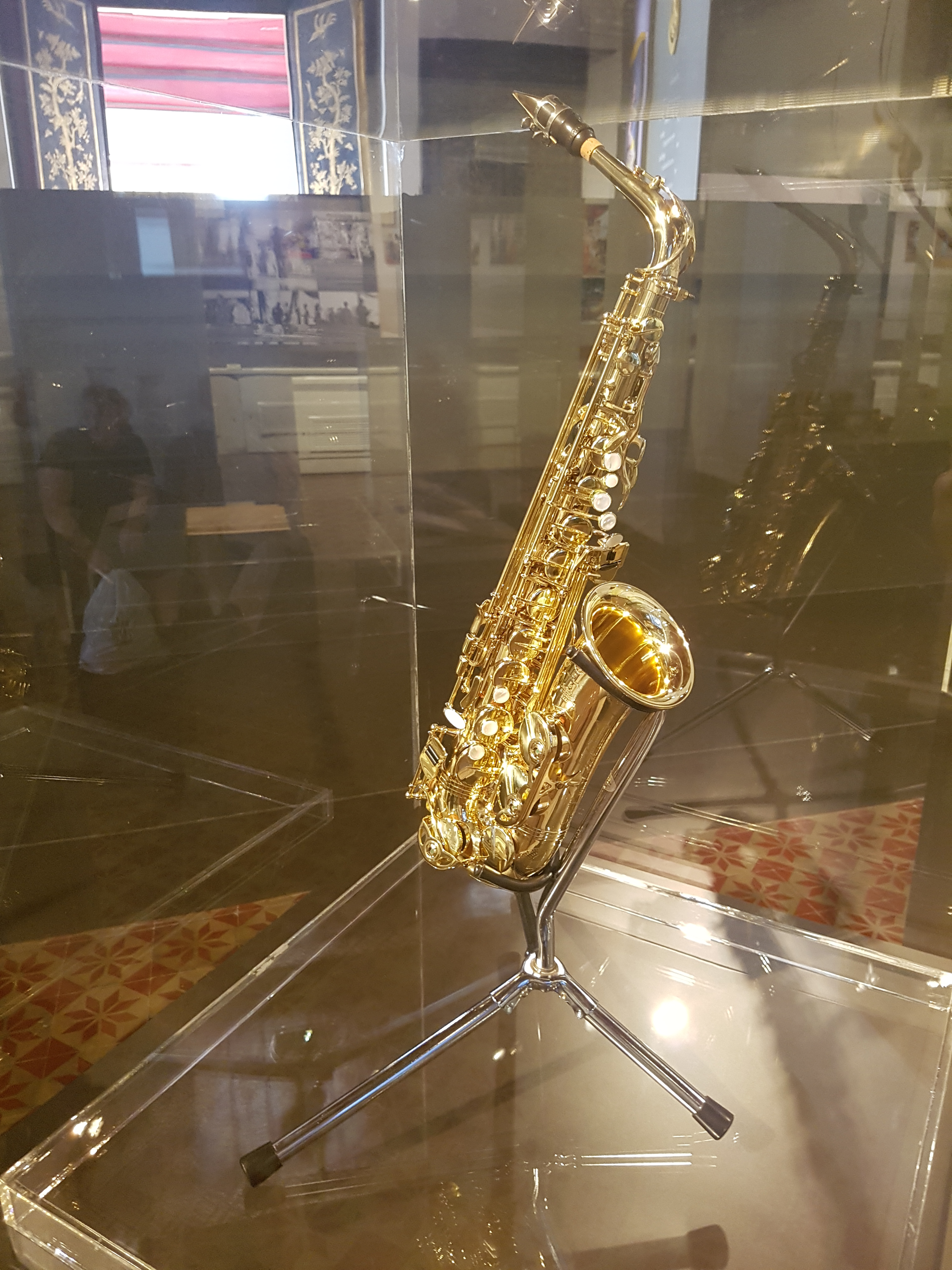
Saxophone of Bhumibol Adulyadej, displayed at Bangkok National Museum

Bhumibol was an accomplished jazz saxophone player and composer, playing Dixieland and New Orleans jazz, and also the clarinet, trumpet, guitar, and piano. It is widely believed that his father, Mahidol Adulyadej, may have inspired his passion for artistic pursuits at an early age. Bhumibol initially focused on classical music exclusively for two years but eventually switched to jazz since it allowed him to improvise more freely. It was during this time that he decided to specialize in wind instruments, especially the saxophone and clarinet. By the time Bhumibol turned 18, he started to compose his own music with the first being "Candlelight Blues". He continued to compose even during his reign following his coronation in 1946. Bhumibol performed with Preservation Hall Jazz Band, Benny Goodman, Stan Getz, Lionel Hampton, and Benny Carter. Throughout his life, Bhumibol wrote a total of 49 compositions. Much of it is jazz swing but he also composed marches, waltzes, and Thai patriotic songs. His most popular compositions are "Candlelight Blues", "Love at Sundown" and "Falling Rain", which were all composed in 1946. Bhumibol's musical influences included Louis Armstrong, Sidney Bechet, Benny Carter, and Johnny Hodges. The Bhumibol Adulyadej (King of Thailand) Collection, 1946–1954 at the Library of Congress Music Division includes some of his compositions, including 13 music manuscripts, 100 pieces of printed music, clippings, correspondence, and other miscellaneous documents.

Bhumibol initially received general music training privately while he was studying in Switzerland, but his older brother, then King Ananda Mahidol, who had bought a saxophone, sent Bhumibol in his place. King Ananda would later join him on the clarinet. On his permanent return to Thailand in 1950, Bhumibol started a jazz band, Lay Kram, whom he performed with on a radio station he started at his palace. The band grew, being renamed the Au Sau Wan Suk Band and he would perform with them live on Friday evenings, occasionally taking telephoned requests. Bhumibol also performed with his band at Thai universities, composing anthems for the universities of Chulalongkorn, Thammasat, and Kasetsart. Bhumibol performed with Benny Goodman at the Amphorn Sathan Residential Hall, in 1956, and later played at Goodman's home in New York in 1960. Many bands such as Les Brown and His Band of Renown, Claude Bolling Big Band, and Preservation Hall Jazz Band recorded some of Bhumibol's compositions and can still be heard in Thailand. A 1996 documentary, Gitarajan, was made about Bhumibol's music.

Bhumibol still played music with his Au Sau Wan Suk Band in later years, but was rarely heard in public. In 1964, Bhumibol became the 23rd person to receive the Certificate of Bestowal of Honorary Membership on behalf of Vienna's University of Music and Performing Arts.

=== Sailing ===
Bhumibol was an accomplished sailor and sailboat designer. He won a gold medal for sailing in the Fourth Southeast Asian Peninsular (SEAP) Games in 1967, together with Princess Ubol Ratana whom he tied for points. This accomplishment was all the more remarkable given Bhumibol's lack of binocular depth perception. On 19 April 1966, Bhumibol also sailed the Gulf of Thailand from Hua Hin to Toey Ngam Harbour in Sattahip, covering 60 nautical miles (110 km) in a 17-hour journey on the "Vega 1", an OK Class dinghy he built.

Like his father, a former military naval engineer, Bhumibol was an avid boat designer and builder. He produced several small sailboat designs in the International Enterprise, OK, and Moth classes. His designs in the Moth class included the "Mod", "Super Mod", and "Micro Mod".

=== Radio amateur ===
Bhumibol was a radio amateur with the call sign HS1A. He was also the patron of the Radio Amateur Society of Thailand (RAST).

=== Patents ===
Bhumibol was the only Thai monarch to hold a patent. He obtained one in 1993 for a waste water aerator named "Chai Pattana", and several patents on rainmaking after 1955: the "sandwich" rainmaking patent in 1999 and the "supersandwich" patent in 2003.

== Wealth ==
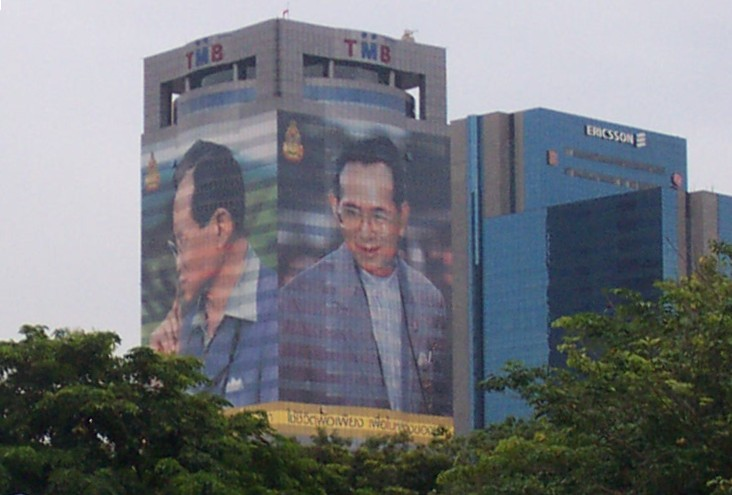
Portrait, TMB Bank office building in Bangkok 2006

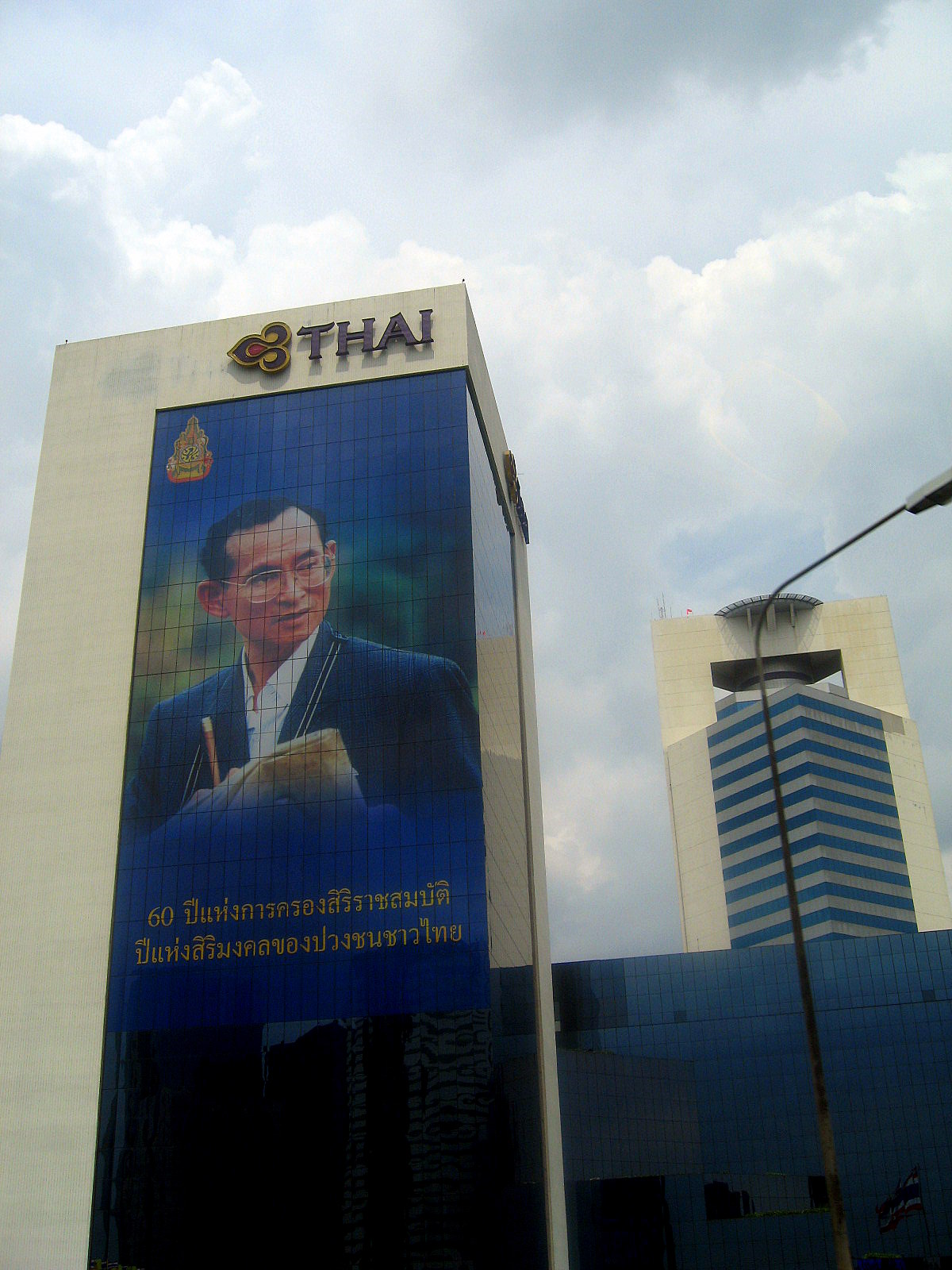
Portrait, Thai Airways International Building

Estimates of the post-devaluation (c. 1997–1998) wealth of the royal household and the Crown Property Bureau (CPB) range from US$10–20 billion. In August 2008, Forbes published its 2008 version of The World's Richest Royals and King Bhumibol was listed first, with an estimated wealth of US$35 billion. A few days later, the Ministry of Foreign Affairs of Thailand issued a statement that the Forbes report incorrectly conflated the wealth of the CPB and that of Bhumibol. In the 2009 Forbes list, the Thai government's objections were acknowledged, but Forbes justified the continued inclusion of the CPB's assets, as the bureau is responsible for handling the Crown's property and investments. The 2009 estimate was a reduced figure of US$30 billion due to declines in real estate and stocks, and this figure was also published in April 2014 by Business Spectator, which also confirmed that the CPB is the body responsible for the management of the Crown's wealth.

The wealth and properties of Bhumibol and the royal family are managed by the Privy Purse. The CPB manages the assets of the Crown as an institution. It was established by law, but is directed without the involvement of the Thai government and reports only to the king. The CPB receives many state privileges. Although the minister of finance presides over the CPB's board of directors, final decisions were made solely by Bhumibol. During his lifetime Bhumibol was the only person who could view the CPB's annual report, which was not released to the public.

Through the CPB, the Crown owns equity in many companies and massive amounts of land, including 3,320 acres in central Bangkok, as well as 13,200 acres of rural land. The CPB owns 32 percent of Siam Cement (worth US$12.6 billion), 23 percent of Siam Commercial Bank (Thailand's largest bank), and interests in Christiani & Nielsen, Deves Insurance, and Shin Corporation.

The CPB also lets or leases about 36,000 properties to third parties, including the sites of the Anantara Siam Bangkok Hotel, the Suan Lum Night Bazaar, Siam Paragon, and the Central World Tower. The CPB spearheaded a plan to turn Bangkok's historical Ratchadamnoen Avenue into a shopping street known as the "Champs-Élysées of Asia" and in 2007, shocked longtime residents of traditional marketplace districts by serving them with eviction notices. The Crown's substantial income from the CPB, estimated to be at least five billion baht in 2004, is exempt from taxes.

King Bhumibol was the owner of the Golden Jubilee Diamond, the largest faceted diamond in the world, which is estimated to be worth between US$4–12 million in April 2014.

== Criticism ==
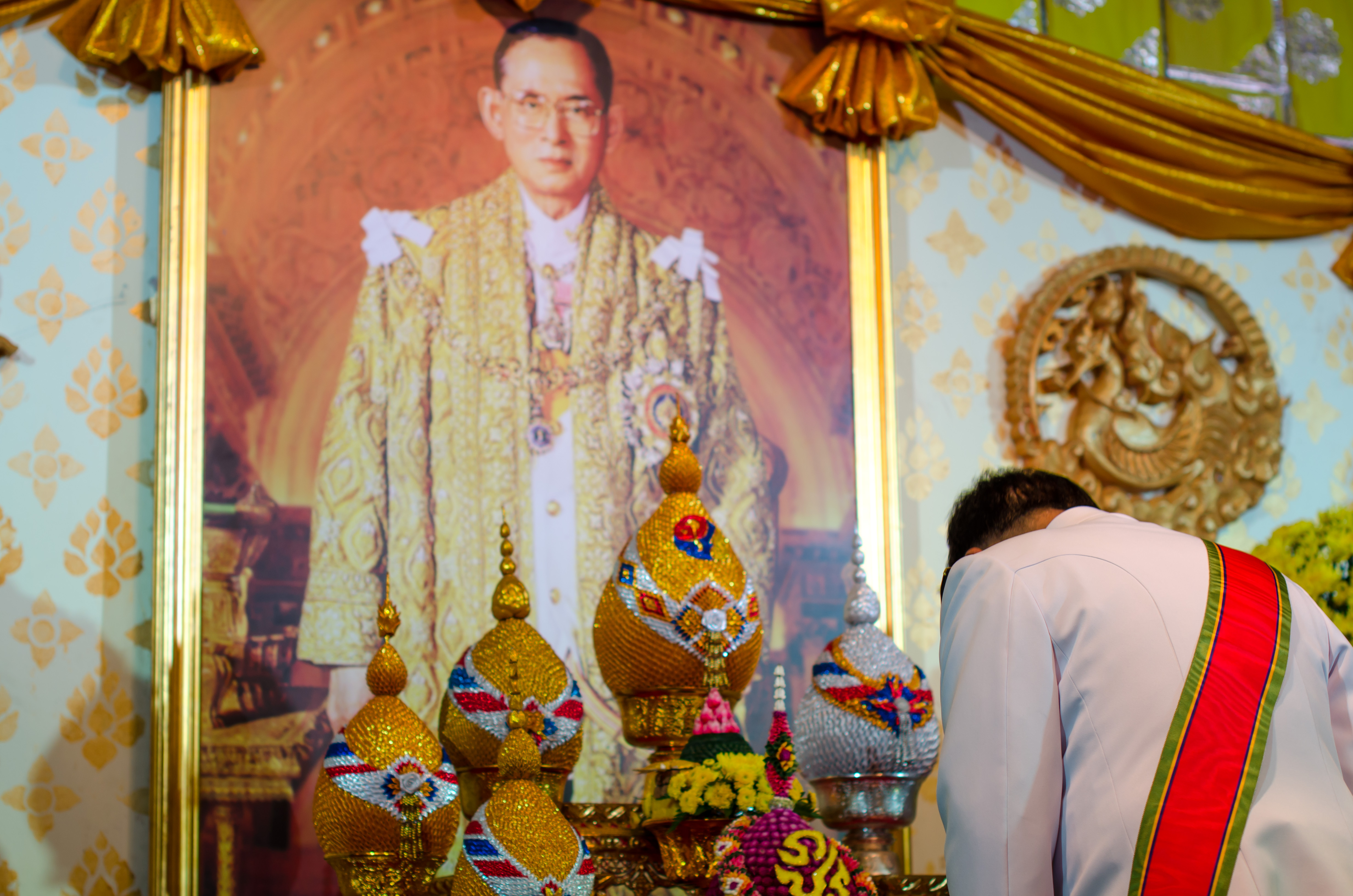
A government officer pays respect to the portrait of King Bhumibol.

Although Bhumibol was held in great respect by many Thais, he was also protected by some of the strictest lèse-majesté laws in the world. Under these laws, critics could be jailed for three to fifteen years. After the Thammasat University Massacre in 1976, the laws were toughened during the dictatorship of royalist and anti-communist Premier Thanin Kraivichien. Criticism of any member of the royal family, the royal development projects, the royal institution, the Chakri Dynasty or any previous Thai king was also banned.

During his 2005 birthday speech, Bhumibol invited criticism: "Actually, I must also be criticised. I am not afraid if the criticism concerns what I do wrong, because then I know. Because if you say the king cannot be criticised, it means that the king is not human", he claimed. "If the king can do no wrong, it is akin to looking down upon him because the king is not being treated as a human being. But the king can do wrong." A widespread barrage of criticisms resulted, followed by a sharp rise in lèse-majesté prosecutions. Lèse-majesté cases rose from five or six a year pre-2005 to 478 in 2010.

Although lèse-majesté officially only applies to current kings, in practice the laws are very broadly construed and flexible. Even after his death, Bhumibol remains protected by lèse-majesté.

== Biographies ==
American journalist Paul Handley, who spent thirteen years in Thailand, wrote the biography The King Never Smiles. The Information and Communications Ministry banned the book and blocked the book's page on the Yale University Press website in January 2006. In a statement dated 19 January 2006, Thai National Police Chief General Kowit Wattana said the book had "contents which could affect national security and the good morality of the people". The book provided a detailed discussion of Bhumibol's role in Thai political history, and it also analyzed the factors behind Bhumibol's popularity.

William Stevenson, who had access to the royal court and the royal family, wrote the biography The Revolutionary King in 2001. An article in Time said the idea for the book was suggested by Bhumibol. Critics noted that the book displayed intimate knowledge about personal aspects of Bhumibol. However, the book was unofficially banned in Thailand and the Bureau of the Royal Household warned the Thai media about even referring to it in print. An official ban was not possible as it was written with Bhumibol's blessing. The book was criticised for factual inaccuracies, disrespecting Bhumibol (it refers to him by his personal nickname "Lek"), and proposing a controversial theory explaining the mysterious death of King Ananda. Stevenson said: "The king said from the beginning the book would be dangerous for him and for me."

== Succession to the throne ==
The King's Royal Cypher and personal flag

Prior to 1972, there was widespread speculation that Bhumibol had been considering his eldest child Ubol Ratana as successor. Ubol Ratana, considered Bhumibol's most intelligent and favorite child, disobeyed her parents by marrying Peter Ladd Jensen, her classmate at Massachusetts Institute of Technology. Her parents stripped her of her royal title and banished her from the court; she did not return to Thailand for eight years. After this, Bhumibol's only son, Prince Vajiralongkorn, was given the title "Somdej Phra Boroma Orasadhiraj Chao Fah Maha Vajiralongkorn Sayam Makutrajakuman" (Crown Prince of Siam) on 28 December 1972 and made heir apparent (องค์รัชทายาท) to the throne in accordance with the Palace Law on Succession of 1924.

On 5 December 1977, Princess Sirindhorn was given the title "Siam Boromrajakumari" (Princess Royal of Siam). Her title is often translated by the English-language press as "Crown Princess", although her official English-language title is simply "Princess".

Although the constitution was later amended to allow the Privy Council to appoint a princess as successor to the throne, this would only occur in the absence of an heir apparent. This amendment is retained in Section 23 of the 1997 "People's Constitution". This effectively allowed Princess Sirindhorn to potentially be second in line to the throne, but did not affect Prince Vajiralongkorn's status as heir apparent.

Recent constitutions of Thailand have made the amendment of the Palace Law of Succession the sole prerogative of the reigning king. According to Assoc. Prof. Gothom Arya, former election commissioner, this allows the reigning king, if he so chooses, to appoint his son or any of his daughters to the throne.

== Titles and honours ==
Styles of: King Bhumibol Adulyadej; Rama IX of Thailand
- Reference style: His Majesty
- Spoken style: Your Majesty

Royal Monogram of King Bhumibol Adulyadej

=== Titles and styles ===
- 5 December 1927 – 9 July 1935: His Highness Prince Bhumibol Aduldej (พระวรวงศ์เธอ พระองค์เจ้าภูมิพลอดุลเดช Phra Worawong Thoe Phra Ong Chao Bhumibol Adulyadej)
- 9 July 1935 – 9 June 1946: His Royal Highness Prince Bhumibol Adulyadej of Siam (สมเด็จพระเจ้าน้องยาเธอ เจ้าฟ้าภูมิพลอดุลยเดช Somdet Phra Chao Nong Ya Thoe Chao Fa Bhumibol Adulyadej)
- 9 June 1946 – 13 October 2016: His Majesty The King of Thailand
  - 9 June 1946 – 5 May 1950 (สมเด็จพระเจ้าอยู่หัว Somdet Phra Chao Yu Hua)
  - 5 May 1950 – 13 October 2016 (พระบาทสมเด็จพระเจ้าอยู่หัว Phra Bat Somdet Phra Chao Yu Hua)

== Issue ==
| Name | Birth | Marriage | | Their children |
| Name | Birth | Date | Spouse | Their children |
|---|---|---|---|---|
| Princess Ubol Ratana | 5 April 1951 (age 75) | 19 August 1972; Divorced 1998 | Peter Ladd Jensen | Than Phu Ying Ploypailin Jensen |
| Princess Ubol Ratana | 5 April 1951 (age 75) | 19 August 1972; Divorced 1998 | Peter Ladd Jensen | Poom Jensen |
| Princess Ubol Ratana | 5 April 1951 (age 75) | 19 August 1972; Divorced 1998 | Peter Ladd Jensen | Than Phu Ying Sirikitiya Jensen |
| Vajiralongkorn (Rama X) | 28 July 1952 (age 74) | 3 January 1977; Divorced 12 August 1991 | Mom Luang Soamsawali Kitiyakara | Bajrakitiyabha, Princess Rajasarini Siribajra |
| Vajiralongkorn (Rama X) | 28 July 1952 (age 74) | February 1994; Divorced 1996 | Yuvadhida Polpraserth | Juthavachara Vivacharawongse |
| Vajiralongkorn (Rama X) | 28 July 1952 (age 74) | February 1994; Divorced 1996 | Yuvadhida Polpraserth | Vacharaesorn Vivacharawongse |
| Vajiralongkorn (Rama X) | 28 July 1952 (age 74) | February 1994; Divorced 1996 | Yuvadhida Polpraserth | Chakriwat Vivacharawongse |
| Vajiralongkorn (Rama X) | 28 July 1952 (age 74) | February 1994; Divorced 1996 | Yuvadhida Polpraserth | Vatchrawee Vivacharawongse |
| Vajiralongkorn (Rama X) | 28 July 1952 (age 74) | February 1994; Divorced 1996 | Yuvadhida Polpraserth | Princess Sirivannavari |
| Vajiralongkorn (Rama X) | 28 July 1952 (age 74) | 10 February 2001; Divorced 11 December 2014 | Srirasmi Suwadee | Prince Dipangkorn Rasmijoti |
| Vajiralongkorn (Rama X) | 28 July 1952 (age 74) | 1 May 2019 | Suthida Tidjai | None |
| Sirindhorn, Princess Royal | 2 April 1955 (age 71) | None | | None |
| Chulabhorn, Princess Srisavangavadhana | 4 July 1957 (age 69) | 7 January 1982; Divorced 1996 | Virayudh Tishyasarin | Princess Siribha Chudabhorn |
| Chulabhorn, Princess Srisavangavadhana | 4 July 1957 (age 69) | 7 January 1982; Divorced 1996 | Virayudh Tishyasarin | Princess Aditayadorn Kitikhun |

== Family tree ==
Relationship between Bhumibol Adulyadej and Sirikit

Savang Vadhana | Chulalongkorn (Rama V) | Uam Bisalayabutra
Apsarasaman Devakula | Kitiyakara Voralaksana
Sangwan Talapat | Mahidol Adulyadej | Bua Kitiyakara | Nakkhatra Mangala
Bhumibol Adulyadej (Rama IX) | Sirikit Kitiyakara

== Works ==
- King Bhumibol Adulyadej of Thailand. The Story of Tongdaeng. Amarin Book, Bangkok. 2004. ISBN 974-272-917-4
- King Bhumibol Adulyadej of Thailand. The Story of Mahajanaka: Cartoon Edition. Amarin Book, Bangkok. 1999. ISBN 974-272-074-6
- King Bhumibol Adulyadej of Thailand. The Story of Mahajanaka. Amarin Book, Bangkok. 1997. ISBN 974-8364-71-2
- King Bhumibol Adulyadej of Thailand, Chaturong Pramkaew (Ed.). My Country Thailand ... land of Everlasting Smile. Amarin Book, Bangkok. 1995. ISBN 974-8363-53-8
- King Bhumibol Adulyadej of Thailand. His Majesty the King's Photographs in the Development of the Country. Photographic Society of Thailand & Thai E, Bangkok. 1992. ISBN 974-88805-0-8
- King Bhumibol Adulyadej of Thailand. Paintings by his Majesty the King: Special exhibition for the Rattanakosin Bicentennial Celebration at the National Gallery, Chao Fa Road, Bangkok, 1 April – 30 June 1982. National Gallery, Bangkok. 1982. ASIN B0007CCDMO

== See also ==
- History of Thailand (1932–1973)
- History of Thailand (1973–2001)
- Public holidays in Thailand
- List of covers of Time magazine (1960s)

=== Namesakes ===
- Bhumibol Adulyadej Hospital
- Kanchanaphisek Bridge
- Rama IX Bridge

== Notes ==
Bhumibol Adulyadej (Rama IX) House of Mahidol Cadet branch of the House of Chakri Born: 5 December 1927 Died: 13 October 2016
Regnal titles
| Preceded by Ananda Mahidol | King of Siam; 9 June 1946 – 11 May 1949 | Siam became "Thailand" |
| New title Siam became "Thailand" | King of Thailand; 11 May 1949 – 13 October 2016 | Succeeded by Vajiralongkorn |
Order of precedence
| Preceded by Princess Bejaratana Rajasuda | Eldest Royal Member of the Chakri dynasty 2011–2016 | Succeeded by Queen Sirikit |
