= Poom Jensen =

Thai prince (1983–2004)

Khun Poom Jensen
- พุ่ม เจนเซน
- Portrait of Poom Jensen
- Born: Bhumi (Poomi) Jensen; August 16, 1983; San Diego, California, US
- Died: December 26, 2004 (aged 21); Khao Lak, Thailand
- Cause of death: Drowning
- Parents: Peter Ladd Jensen (father); Ubolratana (mother)

Khun Poom Jensen (Note: Khun is a Thai courtesy title which is used to show respect but does not indicate a royal status.) (Thai: พุ่ม เจนเซน; RTGS: Phum; Thai pronunciation: [pʰǔm]; August 16, 1983 – December 26, 2004), born Bhumi Jensen (also spelled Poomi Jensen, Thai: ภูมิ เจนเซน; RTGS: Phumi; Thai pronunciation: [pʰuːmí]), was a grandson of King Bhumibol Adulyadej of Thailand, after whom he was named. He was also a nephew of Vajiralongkorn, the current King of Thailand. He was the only son of the King's eldest daughter, Princess Ubolratana Rajakanya, and her American (former) husband Peter Ladd Jensen.

== Early life and education ==
Poom, as he was commonly known, had autism and his status helped heighten awareness of the condition in Thailand. He attended Kasetsart University Laboratory School in Bangkok. He spent his childhood in San Diego County, California, where he graduated from Torrey Pines High School. Poom moved with his mother to Thailand in July 2001, after his graduation. After return to Thailand he studied in Sports Science at Faculty of Education, Kasetsart University.

He was named after his maternal grandfather, King Bhumibol.

== Death and legacy ==
Poom drowned after being struck by the Indian Ocean tsunami on 26 December 2004, while he and his family were on Christmas holiday at the La Flora Resort hotel in Khao Lak. His body was discovered on the beach the following day. His uncle, then-Crown Prince Maha Vajiralongkorn, identified his body and flew the rest of the family to Bangkok. On 30 April 2005, he received a royal funeral attended by his grandfather the King and virtually every member of the Royal Family.

His mother, Princess Ubolratana, established the Khun Poom Foundation in his memory, to aid children with autism and other learning disabilities. She also founded "To Be Number One Project" to campaign against drug usage among teenagers.

== Honors ==
- 1992 – King Rama IX Royal Cypher Medal (First Class).
- 1999 – Medal on the Occasion of the 72nd Birthday Anniversary of King Bhumibol Adulyadej (First Class).

=== Police rank ===
- Police Sub Lieutenant

=== Volunteer Defense Corps of Thailand rank ===
- Volunteer Defense Corps Major
