= List of Thai people =

This is a list of Thai people, persons from Thailand or of Thai descent, who are notable.

== Academics & Educators ==
- Angsana Techatassanasoontorn, Academic
- Banchong Mahaisavariya (born 1955), President of Mahidol University
- Bongkosh Rittichainuwat, Researcher
- Boonlua Debyasuvarn (1911–1982), Educator
- Bundhit Eua-arporn (born 1965), President of Chulalongkorn University
- Chalermek Intanagonwiwat, Computer scientist
- Charnvit Kasetsiri (born 1941), Rector of Thammasat University
- Chetana Nagavajara (born 1937), Academic
- Gasinee Witoonchart (born 1947), Rector of Thammasat University
- Kanchana Kanchanasut, Computer scientist
- Natcha Thawesaengskulthai, Academic
- Niyada Lausunthorn (born 1948), Scholar
- Phraya Anuman Rajadhon (1888–1969), President of the Royal Society
- Pirom Kamolratanakul (born 1949), President of Chulalongkorn University
- Poonsapaya Navawongs na Ayudhya (1910–2015), Educator
- Pornanong Aramwit (born 1970), Pharmaceutical scientist
- Pornchai Mongkhonvanit (born 1958), President of Siam University
- Pramuan Tangboriboonrat (born 1962), Academic and governmental researcher
- Puangthong Pawakapan, Academic
- Saksri Yamnadda (1930–2002), Scholar
- Samruam Singh (1949–1996), Scholar
- Somkit Lertpaithoon (born 1959), Rector of Thammasat University
- Somsak Panyakeow (born 1947), Researcher
- Stang Mongkolsuk (1919–1971), President of Prince of Songkla University
- Suchada Kiranandana (born 1946), President of Chulalongkorn University
- Sujate Jantarang, President of Mahanakorn University of Technology
- Supasawad Chardchawarn (born 1975), Rector of Thammasat University
- Suraphol Nitikraipot (born 1960), Rector of Thammasat University
- Surapol Issaragrisil (born 1950), President of the Royal Society
- Thatchai Sumitra (born 1942), President of Chulalongkorn University
- Theraphan Luangthongkum, Linguist
- Thitinan Pongsudhirak, Political scientist
- Aleksandra Uznańska-Wiśniewska, Polish–Thai politician, political scientist, humanitarian
- Viphandh Roengpithya (born 1938), President of the Asian University
- Wibool Piyawattanametha, Researcher
- Wilert Puriwat, President of Chulalongkorn University
- Worsak Kanok-Nukulchai (born 1948), President of Asian Institute of Technology
- Yuen Poovarawan (born 1950), Computer scientist

== Activists ==
- Arnon Nampa (born 1984), Human rights activist
- Benja Apan (born 1999), Monarchy reforms activist
- Chanchanit Martorell, Human rights activist
- Chanoknan Ruamsap (born 1993), Monarchy reforms activist
- Jaran Ditapichai (born 1947), Human rights activist
- Jintana Kaewkao (born 1962), Environmental activist
- Narisa Chakrabongse (born 1956), Environmental activist
- Netiporn Sanesangkhom (1995–2024), Monarchy reforms activist
- Netiwit Chotiphatphaisal (born 1996), Human rights activist
- Nuamthong Praiwan (1946–2006), Democracy activist
- Panupong Jadnok (born 1996), Monarchy reforms activist
- Panusaya Sithijirawattanakul (born 1998), Monarchy reforms activist
- Parit Chiwarak (born 1998), Monarchy reforms activist
- Pavin Chachavalpongpun (born 1971), Monarchy reforms activist
- Rodjaraeg Wattanapanit, Free speech activist
- Sebastian Demanop (1928–2022), Blind rights activist
- Snea Thinsan (born 1965), Human rights activist
- Somsak Jeamteerasakul (born 1958), Monarchy reforms activist
- Somyot Prueksakasemsuk (born 1961), Free speech activist
- Tiwagorn Withiton (born 1975), Human rights activist
- Wanchalearm Satsaksit (1982–2020), Human rights activist
- Wisut Tangwittayaporn (1968–2012), Free speech activist

== Actors & Actresses ==
- Akara Amarttayakul (born 1974), Actor
- Alexander Rendell (born 1990), Actor
- Amara Asavananda (born 1937), Actress
- Ananda Everingham (born 1982), Actor
- Ann Thongprasom (born 1976), Actress
- Apasiri Nitibhon (born 1971), Actress
- Aranya Namwong (born 1947), Actress
- Araya A. Hargate (born 1981), Actress
- Areeya Chumsai (born 1971), Actress
- Attachai Anantameak (born 1965), Actor
- Bongkoj Khongmalai (born 1985), Actress
- Carissa Springett (born 1998), Actress
- Chalida Vijitvongthong (born 1993), Actress
- Chalita Suansane (born 1994), Actress
- Chanon Santinatornkul (born 1996), Actor
- Charlie Trairat (born 1993), Actor
- Charm Osathanond (born 1987), Actress
- Chatchai Plengpanich (born 1960), Actor
- Chattapong Pantana-Angkul (born 1971), Actor
- Chermarn Boonyasak (born 1982), Actress
- Cherprang Areekul (born 1996), Actress
- Chintara Sukapatana (born 1965), Actress
- Chonlathorn Kongyingyong (born 1998), Actor
- Cindy Bishop (born 1978), Actress
- Cris Horwang (born 1980), Actress
- Davika Hoorne (born 1992), Actress
- Daweerit Chullasapya (born 1983), Actor
- Engfa Waraha (born 1995), Actress
- Farida Waller (born 1993), Actress
- Florence Faivre (born 1983), Actress
- Intira Charoenpura (born 1980), Actress
- Janaprakal Chandruang (born 1954), Actress
- James Ma (born 1993), Actor
- Janie Tienphosuwan (born 1981), Actress
- Jarunee Suksawat (born 1962), Actress
- Jason Young (born 1980), Actor
- Jesdaporn Pholdee (born 1977), Actor
- Jessica Pasaphan (born 1988), Actress
- Jirayu Tangsrisuk (born 1993), Actor
- Johnny Anfone (born 1969), Actor
- Kanyawee Songmuang (born 1996), Actress
- Kathaleeya McIntosh (born 1972), Actress
- Kemisara Paladesh (born 1995), Actress
- Kesarin Chaichalermpol (born 1985), Porn actress
- Kessarin Ektawatkul (born 1981), Actress
- Khemanit Jamikorn (born 1988), Actress
- Khemupsorn Sirisukha (born 1980), Actress
- Kimberley Anne Woltemas (born 1992), Actress
- Krystal Vee (born 1987), Actress
- Lalita Panyopas (born 1971), Actress
- Lena Christensen (born 1978), Actress
- Leo Saussay (born 1990), TV host
- Maria Poonlertlarp (born 1992), Actress
- Mario Maurer (born 1988), Actor
- Metinee Kingpayome (born 1972), Actress
- Michael Chaturantabut (born 1975), Actor
- Mitr Chaibancha (1934–1970), Actor
- Morakot Sangtaweep (born 1984), Actress
- Nadech Kugimiya (born 1991), Actor
- Namthip Jongrachatawiboon (born 1982), Actress
- Napakpapha Nakprasitte (born 1981), Actress
- Naphat Siangsomboon (born 1996), Actor
- Nattasha Bunprachom (born 1987), Actress
- Nichaphat Chatchaipholrat (born 1995), Actor
- Nittha Jirayungyurn (born 1990), Actress
- Nonthawan Bramaz (born 1992), Actress
- Pachara Chirathivat (born 1993), Actor
- Patcharapa Chaichua (born 1978), Actress
- Patharawarin Timkul (born 1977), Actress
- Pakorn Chatborirak (born 1984), Actor
- Pakorn Lam (born 1979), Actor
- Paula Taylor (born 1983), Actress
- Penpak Sirikul (born 1961), Actress
- Peranee Kongthai (born 1989), Actress
- Petchara Chaowarat (born 1943), Actress
- Peter Corp Dyrendal (born 1976), Actor
- Phiyada Jutharattanakul (born 1975), Actress
- Phitchanat Sakhakon (born 1981), Actress
- Pongpat Wachirabunjong (born 1961), Actor
- Porntip Papanai (born 1982), Actress
- Praya Lundberg (born 1992), Actress
- Preechaya Pongthananikorn (born 1993), Actress
- Prin Suparat (born 1990), Actor
- Pumwaree Yodkamol (born 1982), Actress
- Puttichai Kasetsin (born 1986), Actor
- Ranee Campen (born 1989), Actress
- Rasri Balenciaga Chirathiwat (born 1990), Actress
- Ray MacDonald (born 1977), Actor
- Sammy Cowell (born 1991), Actress
- Sara Malakul Lane (born 1983), Actress
- Sawika Chaiyadech (born 1986), Actress
- Shahkrit Yamnam (born 1978), Actor
- Sinjai Plengpanich (born 1965), Actress
- Siriyakorn Pukkavesh (born 1974), Actress
- Sodsai Pantoomkomol (born 1934), Actress
- Sombat Metanee (1937–2022), Actor
- Songsit Roongnophakunsri (born 1967), Actor
- Sonia Couling (born 1974), Actress
- Sorapong Chatree (1950–2022), Actor
- Sornram Teppitak (born 1973), Actor
- Sririta Jensen Narongdej (born 1981), Actress
- Stella Malucchi (born 1977), Actress
- Sukollawat Kanaros (born 1985), Actor
- Supakorn Kitsuwon (born 1972), Actor
- Sunny Suwanmethanont (born 1981), Actor
- Suvanant Punnakant (born 1978), Actress
- Suwinit Panjamawat (born 1984), Actor
- Taksaorn Paksukcharern (born 1980), Actress
- Theeradej Wongpuapan (born 1977), Actor
- Teeradon Supapunpinyo (born 1997), Actor
- Thanapob Leeratanakachorn (born 1994), Actor
- Thikamporn Ritta-apinan (born 1987), Actress
- Tony Jaa (born 1976), Actor
- Toon Hiranyasap (born 1954), Actor
- Ungsumalynn Sirapatsakmetha (born 1991), Actress
- Urassaya Sperbund (born 1993), Actress
- Utt Panichkul (born 1973), Actor
- Vachirawit Chivaaree (born 1997), Actor
- Vanessa Herrmann (born 1991), Actress
- Warattaya Nilkuha (born 1983), Actress
- Willie McIntosh (born 1970), Actor
- Winai Kraibutr (1969–2024), Actor
- Woranuch Bhirombhakdi (born 1980), Actress
- Worarat Suwannarat (born 1977), Actress

== Archaeologists & Historians ==
- Chirapat Prapandvidya (born 1941), Archaeologist
- Chit Phumisak (1930–1966), Historian
- Nidhi Eoseewong (1940–2023), Historian
- Santi Leksukhum (born 1945), Archaeologist
- Sujit Wongthes (born 1945), Archaeologist
- Sunait Chutintaranond (born 1956), Historian
- Thanik Lertcharnrit (born 1964), Archaeologist
- Thongchai Winichakul (born 1957), Historian

== Architects ==
- Ercole Manfredi (1883–1973), Architect
- Luang Wisansinlapakam (1885–1982), Architect
- Pinyo Suwankiri (born 1937), Architect
- Rangsan Torsuwan (born 1939), Architect

== Artists ==
- Chalood Nimsamer (1929–2015), sculptor
- Silpa Bhirasri (1892–1962), sculptor
- Bundith Phunsombatlert (born 1972), multimedia artist who works in New York City
- Surojana Sethabutra (born 1956), ceramic artist

== Athletes ==
- Abdulhafiz Bueraheng (born 1995), Professional footballer
- Adul Lahsoh (born 1986), Professional footballer
- Airfan Doloh (born 2001), Professional footballer
- Ajcharaporn Kongyot (born 1995), Indoor volleyball player
- Alex Albon (born 1996), Racing driver
- Alexander Sieghart (born 1994), Professional footballer
- Amanda Carr (born 1990), BMX cyclist
- Anthony Ampaipitakwong (born 1988), Professional footballer
- Antonio Verzura (born 1992), Professional footballer
- August Gustafsson Lohaprasert (born 1993), Professional footballer
- Chanathip Songkrasin (born 1993), Professional footballer
- Chanatip Sonkham (born 1991), Taekwondo athlete
- Charyl Chappuis (born 1992), Professional footballer
- Chatchu-on Moksri (born 1999), Indoor volleyball player
- Dennis Buschening (born 1991), Professional footballer
- Ernesto Amantegui Phumipha (born 1990), Professional footballer
- Gionata Verzura (born 1992), Professional footballer
- Hermann Husslein (born 1985), Slalom canoeist
- Kanok Koryangphueak (born 1989), Professional footballer
- Karina Krause (born 1989), Indoor volleyball player
- Kawin Thamsatchanan (born 1990), Professional footballer
- Kevin Deeromram (born 1997), Professional footballer
- Kiattipong Radchatagriengkai (born 1966), Indoor volleyball player
- Kissada Nilsawai (born 1992), Indoor volleyball player
- Malika Kanthong (born 1987), Indoor volleyball player
- Manuel Bihr (born 1993), Professional footballer
- Marco Ballini (born 1998), Professional footballer
- Mika Chunuonsee (born 1989), Professional footballer
- Muhammad Osamanmusa (born 1998), Futsal player
- Narissapat Lam (born 1996), Badminton player
- Narumon Khanan (born 1983), Indoor volleyball player
- Nina Ligon (born 1991), Equestrian
- Nootsara Tomkom (born 1985), Indoor volleyball player
- Panipak Wongpattanakit (born 1997), Taekwondo athlete
- Patrick Aaltonen (born 1994), Professional footballer
- Peter Läng (born 1986), Professional footballer
- Philip Roller (born 1994), Professional footballer
- Pimpichaya Kokram (born 1998), Indoor volleyball player
- Pleumjit Thinkaow (born 1983), Indoor volleyball player
- Ratchanok Intanon (born 1995), Badminton player
- Samuel Cunningham (born 1989), Professional footballer
- Sandy Stuvik (born 1995), Racing driver
- Sarach Yooyen (born 1992), Professional footballer
- Saymai Paladsrichuay (born 1987), Indoor volleyball player
- Sumkhan Poamsombat (born 1979), Professional footballer
- Supachai Chaided (born 1998), Professional footballer
- Tamarine Tanasugarn (born 1977), Tennis player
- Theerathon Bunmathan (born 1990), Professional footballer
- Tiffany Bias (born 1992), Professional basketball player
- Tristan Do (born 1993), Professional footballer
- Wiradech Kothny (born 1979), Fencer
- Yodtong Senanan (1937–2013), Muay Thai fighter

== Authors ==
- Apinan Poshyananda (born 1956), Writer
- Fa Poonvoralak (born 1953), Writer
- Kamin Kamani, Writer
- K.S.R. Kulap (1834–1921), Writer
- Ngarmpun Vejjajiva (born 1963), Writer
- Nongchanai Prinyathawat (1921–2014), Novelist
- Prabda Yoon (born 1973), Writer
- Saneh Sangsuk (born 1953), Writer
- Seksan Prasertkul (born 1949), Novelist
- Thirayuth Boonmee (born 1950), Writer

== Buddhist priests ==
- Ajahn Thate (1902–1994), Meditation master
- Buddhadasa (1906–1993), Abbot of Wat Phra Borommathat Chaiya Temple
- Luangphor Viriyang Sirintharo (1920–2020), Patriarch of the Dhammayuttika Nikaya Order in Canada
- Pavares Variyalongkorn (1809–1892), Supreme Patriarch

== Businesspeople ==
- Bhurit Bhirombhakdi (born 1977), CEO of Boon Rawd Brewery Group
- Charoen Sirivadhanabhakdi (born 1944), Chairman of Thai Beverage and Fraser and Neave
- Chira Ratanarat (1940–2022), CEO of The Siam Chemicals
- Dhanin Chearavanont (born 1939), Senior chairman of CP Group
- Harald Link (born 1955), Chairman of B.Grimm
- James Yenbamroong (born 1984), CEO of mu Space
- Keeree Kanjanapas (born 1950), CEO of Bangkok Mass Transit System
- Patima Jeerapaet (born 1967), CEO of Thai AirAsia
- Prasert Prasarttong-Osoth (born 1933), Owner of Bangkok Dusit Medical Services and Bangkok Airways
- Vichai Srivaddhanaprabha (1958–2018), Founder of King Power
- William Heinecke (born 1949), Chairman of Minor International

== Comedians ==
- Mum Jokmok (born 1965), Comedian
- Joey Chernyim (born 1974), Comedian
- Lor Tok (1914–2002), Comedian
- Suthep Po-ngam (born 1950), Comedian

== Economists ==
- Charit Tingsabadh (born 1950), Economist
- Pasuk Phongpaichit (born 1946), Economist
- Suthawan Sathirathai (born 1958), Economist

== Engineers ==
- Krisada Kritayakirana, Engineer
- Rachot Kanjanavanit (1924–1996), President of the Engineering Institute of Thailand
- Thongtip Ratanarat (born 1942), Executive director of Petroleum and Energy Institute of Thailand

== Film and Television producers ==
- Apichatpong Weerasethakul (born 1970), Film director
- Michael Shaowanasai (born 1964), Film director
- Pisut Praesangeam (born 1971), Film director
- Tanit Jitnukul (born 1956), Film director
- Tom Waller (born 1974), Film director

== Financiers ==
- Chin Sophonpanich (1910–1998), Founder of Bangkok Bank
- Kesree Narongdej (1935–2017), President of the Federation of Accounting Professions

== Government and politicians ==
- Abhisit Vejjajiva (born 1964), 27th Prime Minister
- Ammar Siamwalla (born 1939), Member of the National Legislative Assembly
- Anek Laothamatas (born 1954), Minister of Higher Education, Science, Research and Innovation
- Apirak Kosayodhin (born 1961), Governor of Bangkok
- Atchaka Sibunruang (born 1955), Minister of Science and Technology
- Atthaphon Charoenchansa (born 1966), Director-General of the National Parks, Wildlife, and Plant Conservation Department
- Boonchu Rojanastien (1921–2007), Deputy Prime Minister
- Boonmark Sirinaovakul (born 1955), Member of the House of Representatives
- Boonsanong Punyodyana (1936–1976), General secretary of the Socialist Party of Thailand
- Boonsong Chalethorn (born 1953), Politician
- Borwornsak Uwanno (born 1954), President of the Constitution Drafting Committee
- Bunsom Martin (1922–2008), Minister of Education
- Chai-Anan Samudavanija (1944–2018), Member of the National Legislative Assembly
- Chaikasem Nitisiri (born 1948), Minister of Justice
- Chalard Worachat (1943–2021), Member of the House of Representatives
- Chaleo Yoovidhya (1923–2012), Senator
- Chalerm Prommas (1895–1975), Minister of Public Health
- Chalongphob Sussangkarn (1950–2024), Minister of Finance
- Chamlong Srimuang (born 1935), Deputy Prime Minister
- Chaophraya Thiphakorawong (1813–1870), Minister of Exchequer
- Chatumongol Sonakul (born 1943), Minister of Labour
- Chirayu Isarangkun Na Ayuthaya (born 1942), Lord Chamberlain of the Household
- Chirayu Navawongs (1912–2003), Deputy Minister of Education
- Chitchai Wannasathit (born 1946), Deputy Prime Minister
- Chonthicha Jaengraew (born 1995), Member of the House of Representatives
- Chuan Leekpai (born 1938), 20th Prime Minister
- Chuchat Kamphu (1905–1969), Deputy Minister of National Development
- Chuwit Kamolvisit (born 1961), Member of the House of Representatives
- Direk Jayanama (1905–1967), Deputy Prime Minister
- Giles Ji Ungpakorn (born 1953), Chairman of Socialist Workers Thailand
- Issara Sereewatthanawut (born 1983), Member of the House of Representatives
- Jakrapob Penkair (born 1967), Minister to the Office of the Prime Minister
- Jaran Ditapichai (born 1947), Politician
- Jaruwat Keyunvan (born 1980), Representative of the Chairman of Socialist Workers Thailand
- Jatuporn Prompan (born 1965), Member of the House of Representatives
- Jermsak Pinthong (born 1950), Member of the National Reform Council
- Jon Ungphakorn (born 1947), Senator
- Kaewsan Atibodhi (born 1951), Senator
- Karoon Sai-ngam (born 1952), Senator
- Khrong Chandawong (1908–1961), Member of the House of Representatives
- Khuang Aphaiwong (1902–1968), 4th Prime Minister
- Kittiratt Na-Ranong (born 1958), Deputy Prime Minister
- Kobsak Pootrakool (born 1968), Minister of the Office of the Prime Minister
- Kokaew Pikulthong (born 1965), Member of the House of Representatives
- Kowit Wattana (born 1947), Deputy Prime Minister
- Kraisak Choonhavan (1947–2020), Senator
- Krisda Arunvongse na Ayudhya (1932–2010), Governor of Bangkok
- Krit Ratanarak (born 1946), Senator
- Kukrit Pramoj (1911–1995), 13th Prime Minister
- Lady Meriam, Wife of the Prime Minister of Malaysia
- Lek Nana (1924–2010), Minister of Science and Technology
- Likhit Dhiravegin (1941–2016), Deputy Minister of Interior
- Luang Wichitwathakan (1898–1962), Minister of Economic Affairs
- Mano Laohavanich (born 1956), Member of the National Reform Council
- Manoonkrit Roopkachorn (born 1935), President of the Senate
- Mechai Viravaidya (born 1941), Minister to the office of the Prime Minister
- Mongkol Na Songkhla (1941–2020), Minister of Public Health
- Naga Devahastin na Ayudhya (1901–1969), Permanent Secretary of the Ministry of Education
- Nattawut Saikua (born 1975), Deputy Minister of Commerce
- Nitya Pibulsonggram (1941–2014), Minister of Foreign Affairs
- Noppadon Pattama (born 1961), Minister of Foreign Affairs
- Nualphan Lamsam (born 1966), Assistant to the Governor of Bangkok
- Ouay Ketusingh (1908–1990), Member of the National Legislative Assembly
- Pallop Pinmanee (born 1936), Adviser to the Prime Minister
- Panitan Wattanayagorn (born 1960), Deputy Secretary-General to the Prime Minister
- Prasong Soonsiri (born 1927), Minister of Foreign Affairs
- Phraya Manopakorn Nitithada (1884–1948), 1st Prime Minister
- Phraya Ratsadanupradit Mahitsaraphakdi (1857–1913), Commissioner of Phuket
- Pin Malakul (1903–1995), Minister of Education
- Piyabutr Saengkanokkul (born 1979), Member of the House of Representatives
- Piyasvasti Amranand (born 1953), Minister of Energy
- Pongpol Adireksarn (born 1942), Deputy Prime Minister
- Prapat Panyachatraksa (born 1952), Minister of Natural Resources and the Environment
- Prasert na Nagara (1919–2019), Permanent Secretary of the Ministry of University Affairs
- Prateep Ungsongtham Hata (born 1952), Senator
- Prawase Wasi (born 1931), President of the National Reform Assembly
- Prayut Chan-o-cha (born 1954), 29th Prime Minister
- Prem Tinsulanonda (1920–2019), 16th Prime Minister
- Pridi Banomyong (1900–1983), 7th Prime Minister
- Pridiyathorn Devakula (born 1947), Deputy Prime Minister
- Prommin Lertsuridej (born 1954), Deputy Prime Minister
- Puey Ungphakorn (1916–1999), Governor of the Bank of Thailand
- Rajata Rajatanavin (born 1950), Minister of Public Health
- Rapee Sagarik (1922–2018), Deputy Minister of Agriculture and Cooperatives
- Samak Sundaravej (1935–2009), 25th Prime Minister
- Sang Phathanothai (1915–1986), Advisors to the Prime Minister
- Sanguan Tularak (1902–1995), Minister
- Sanya Dharmasakti (1907–2002), 12th Prime Minister
- Seni Pramoj (1905–1997), 6th Prime Minister
- Serm Vinicchayakul (1907–1985), Minister of Finance
- Sethaput Suthiwartnarueput (born 1965), Governor of the Bank of Thailand
- Sippanondha Ketudat (1931–2006), Minister of Industry
- So Sethaputra (1904–1970), Minister
- Somkid Jatusripitak (born 1953), Deputy Prime Minister
- Sood Sangvichien (1907–1995), Member of the National Legislative Assembly
- Suchai Charoenratanakul (born 1955), Deputy Prime Minister
- Suchart Chaovisith (1940–2009), Deputy Prime Minister
- Suchart Thada-Thamrongvech (born 1952), Minister of Education
- Suchatvee Suwansawat (born 1972), Politician
- Sudarat Keyuraphan (born 1961), Minister of Agriculture and Cooperatives
- Sukich Nimmanheminda (1906–1976), Deputy Prime Minister
- Sukhumbhand Paribatra (born 1953), Governor of Bangkok
- Sunanta Kangvalkulkij, Ambassador
- Sunthorn Kongsompong (1931–1999), Chairman of the National Peacekeeping Council
- Supachai Panitchpakdi (born 1946), Deputy Prime Minister
- Surin Pitsuwan (1949–2017), 12th Secretary-General of ASEAN
- Suriyasai Katasila (born 1972), Secretary-general of New Politics Party
- Sutham Sangprathum (born 1953), Minister of University Affairs
- Tarisa Watanagase (born 1949), Governor of the Bank of Thailand
- Tavida Kamolvej, Deputy Governor of Bangkok
- Thaksin Shinawatra (born 1949), 23rd Prime Minister
- Thammarak Isarangkura na Ayudhaya (born 1938), Minister of Defence
- Thanathorn Juangroongruangkit (born 1978), Member of the House of Representatives
- Thanin Kraivichien (born 1927), 14th Prime Minister
- Thanong Bidaya (born 1947), Minister of Finance
- Thaworn Senniam (born 1947), Deputy Prime Minister
- Thida Thavornseth (born 1944), Chairwoman of the United Front for Democracy Against Dictatorshi
- Thirachai Phuvanatnaranubala (born 1951), Minister of Finance
- Trairong Suwankiri (born 1944), Deputy Prime Minister
- Tuenjai Deetes (born 1952), Senator
- Aleksandra Uznańska-Wiśniewska, Polish–Thai politician, political scientist, and humanitarian, member of the Sejm of Poland (since 2023)
- Veera Musikapong (born 1948), Deputy Minister of Interior
- Vilawan Mangklatanakul (born 1964), Ambassador
- Vitit Muntarbhorn (born 1952), United Nations Special Rapporteur on the situation of human rights in Cambodia
- Virachai Virameteekul (born 1967), Minister of Science and Technology
- Weng Tojirakarn (born 1951), Member of the House of Representatives
- Wichit Srisa-an (1934–2023), Minister of Education
- William Alfred Tilleke (1860–1918), Privy councilor
- Winai Dahlan (born 1952), Member of the National Reform Council
- Wisanu Subsompon, Deputy Governor of Bangkok
- Wissanu Krea-ngam (born 1951), Deputy Prime Minister
- Yingluck Shinawatra (born 1967), 28th Prime Minister
- Yongyuth Yuthavong (born 1944), Deputy Prime Minister
- Yut Saeng-uthai (1908–1979), Secretary of the Council of State

== Health professionals ==
- Krisana Kraisintu (born 1952), Pharmacist

== Influencers ==
- Gigguk (born 1990), YouTuber
- Praiwan Wannabut (born 1991), Influencer

== Lawyers ==
- Banjerd Singkaneti (born 1964), Law Reform Committee
- Kanakorn Pianchana (1969–2020), Judge
- Kittisak Prokati (born 1956), Lawyer
- Prinya Thaewanarumitkul (born 1968), Lawyer
- Santi Thakral (1942–2011), 33rd President of the Supreme Court
- Somyot Chueathai (born 1950), Lawyer
- Taweekiet Meenakanit (born 1953), Lawyer
- Worachet Pakeerut (born 1969), Lawyer

== Mathematicians ==
- Ngamta Thamwattana, Mathematician

== Military personnels ==
- Khattiya Sawasdipol, General

== Models ==
- Bui Simon (born 1969), Miss Universe 1988
- Natalie Kanyapak Phoksomboon (born 1991), Miss Thailand World 2013
- Nicolene Limsnukan (born 1998), Miss Thailand World 2018
- Niratcha Tungtisanont, Beauty pageant titleholder
- Paweensuda Drouin (born 1993), Miss Universe Thailand 2019
- Sophida Kanchanarin (born 1995), Miss Universe Thailand 2018

== Monarchs & Royalty ==
- Ananda Mahidol (1925–1946), 8th King of Siam
- Bajrakitiyabha (1978–2026), Princess
- Bhumibol Adulyadej (1927–2016), 9th King of Thailand
- Chudadhuj Dharadilok (1892–1923), Prince of Phetchabun
- Chula Chakrabongse (1908–1963), Prince
- Chulabhorn (born 1957), Princess
- Chulalongkorn (1853–1910), 5th King of Siam
- Damrong Rajanubhab (1862–1943), Prince Minister
- Devawongse Varoprakar (1858–1923), Prince Minister
- Galyani Vadhana (1923–2008), Princess of Naradhiwas
- Lakshamilavan (1899–1961), Princess consort
- Mahidol Adulyadej (1892–1929), Prince of Songkhla
- Marsi Paribatra (1930–2013), Princess
- Mongkut (1804–1868), 4th King of Siam
- Ploypailin Jensen (born 1981), Member of the Thai royal family
- Poom Jensen (1983–2004), Member of the Thai royal family
- Prajadhipok (1893–1941), 7th King of Siam
- Prem Purachatra (1915–1981), Prince
- Rama I (1737–1809), 1st King of Rattanakosin
- Rama II (1767–1824), 2nd King of Rattanakosin
- Rama III (1788–1851), 3rd King of Rattanakosin
- Rambai Barni (1904–1984), Queen consort of Siam
- Saovabha Phongsri, Queen Regent of Siam
- Sirikit (born 1932), Queen Regent of Thailand
- Sirikitiya Jensen (born 1985), Member of the Thai royal family
- Sirindhorn (born 1955), Princess Royal
- Sirivannavari (born 1987), Princess
- Soamsawali (born 1957), Princess consort to the Crown Prince
- Subhadradis Diskul (1923–2003), Prince
- Suthida (born 1978), Queen consort of Thailand
- Ubol Ratana (born 1951), Princess
- Vajiralongkorn (born 1952), 10th King of Thailand
- Vajiravudh (1881–1925), 6th King of Siam
- Vodhyakara Varavarn (1900–1981), Prince
- Wan Waithayakon (1891–1976), Prince Minister

== Musicians ==
- Amphol Lumpoon (born 1963), Singer
- Anan Anwar (born 1986), Singer
- Andrea Suárez, Singer
- BamBam (born 1997), Singer
- Billy Ogan (born 1966), Singer
- Bruce Gaston (1946–2021), Thai classical
- Charoenchai Sundaravadin (1915–2011), Thai classical
- Chinawut Indracusin (born 1989), Singer
- Christina Aguilar (born 1966), Singer
- Christy Gibson (born 1978), Thai traditional singer
- Gena Desouza (born 1997), Singer
- Hugo (born 1981), Singer
- Jannine Weigel (born 2000), Singer
- Chan Yenkhae (1926–1988), Singer
- Jetrin Wattanasin (born 1970), Singer
- Jonas Anderson (born 1972), Thai traditional singer
- Joni Anwar (born 1981), Rapper
- Kamtorn Sanidwong (1925–2000), Classical
- Katreeya English (born 1976), Singer
- Krissada Sukosol Clapp (born 1970), Singer
- Lanna Commins (born 1983), Singer
- Lapat Ngamchaweng (born 1998), Singer
- Lisa (born 1997), Rapper
- Lydia Sarunrat Deane (born 1987), Singer
- Mai Charoenpura (born 1969), Singer
- Marsha Vadhanapanich (born 1970), Singer
- Michele Waagaard (born 1980), Singer
- Minnie (born 1997), Singer
- Monkaen Kaenkoon (born 1973), Singer
- Myra Molloy (born 1997), Singer
- Myria Benedetti (born 1975), Singer
- Montri Tramote (1900–1995), Thai classical
- Nakadia (born 1980), DJ
- Nat Sakdatorn (born 1983), Singer
- Natchar Pancharoen, Pianist
- Natty (born 2002), Singer
- Nene Royal (born 2010), Singer, Guitarist
- Nichkhun (born 1988), Singer
- Nicole Theriault (born 1972), Singer
- Palmy (born 1981), Singer
- Patiparn Patavekarn (born 1973), Singer
- Phai Phongsathon (born 1982), Thai traditional singer
- Phra Chenduriyang (1883–1968), Composer
- Phuwaryne Keenan (born 1988), Singer
- Pongsak Rattanapong (born 1985), Singer
- Pumpuang Duangjan (1961–1992), Thai traditional singer
- Rhatha Phongam (born 1983), Singer
- Somlek Sakdikul (born 1953), Singer
- Sorn (born 1996), Singer
- Supaksorn Chaimongkol (born 1982), Singer
- Tai Orathai (born 1980), Thai traditional singer
- Tata Young (born 1980), Singer
- Ten (born 1996), Singer
- Thanakrit Panichwid (born 1985), Singer
- Thanis Sriklindee (born 1951), Thai classical
- Thongchai McIntyre (born 1958), Singer
- Tom Dundee, Singer
- Violette Wautier (born 1993), Singer
- Worrawech Danuwong (born 1984), Singer

== Physicians ==
- George B. McFarland (1866–1942), Physician
- Kalyanakit Kitiyakara (1929–1987), Cardiothoracic surgery
- Kobchitt Limpaphayom (born 1940), Obstetrics and gynaecology
- Luang Phinphakphitthayaphet (1900–1977), Radiology
- Nikorn Dusitsin (born 1931), Obstetrics and gynaecology
- Prasop Ratanakorn (1920–2012), Psychologist
- Sutee Yoksan (born 1949), Research physician
- Thiravat Hemachudha (born 1954), Neurologist
- Yong Poovorawan (born 1950), Pediatrics
- Yongyudh Vajaradul (born 1940), Orthopedics

== Scientists ==
- Banchob Sripa (born 1958), Pathologist
- Chote Suvatti (1905–1991), Ichthyologist
- Kansri Boonpragob, Lichenology
- Natsurang Homchantara (1957–2006), Lichenology
- Pichaet Wiriyachitra (born 1944), Organic chemist
- Rawi Bhavilai (1925–2017), Astronomer
- Shaiwatna Kupratakul (born 1940), Theoretical physicist
- Supawan Tantayanon (born 1951), Chemist
- Watchara Kasinrerk, Immunology
- Yupa Hanboonsong, Entomologist

== Others ==
- Ommi Pipit-Suksun, Ballerina
- Thitinart Na Pattalung (born 1969), Self-help guru

== See also ==
- List of Thai actresses
- List of Thai actors
- List of Thai film directors
- List of prime ministers of Thailand
- Category:Thai royalty
- Lists of people by nationality
