= Banchong =

Banchong or Banjong (Thai: บรรจง) is a Thai masculine given name. People with the name include:

- Banchong Mahaisavariya, orthopedic surgeon and president of Mahidol University
- Joseph Banchong Aribarg (1927–2012), Roman Catholic bishop
- Philip Banchong Chaiyara (born 1945), Roman Catholic bishop
- Banjong Pisanthanakun, film director
- Banchong Sriopchoey, Crowdfunder
- Bunjong Sinsiri, boxer
