= Rodjaraeg Wattanapanit =

Thai free speech activist

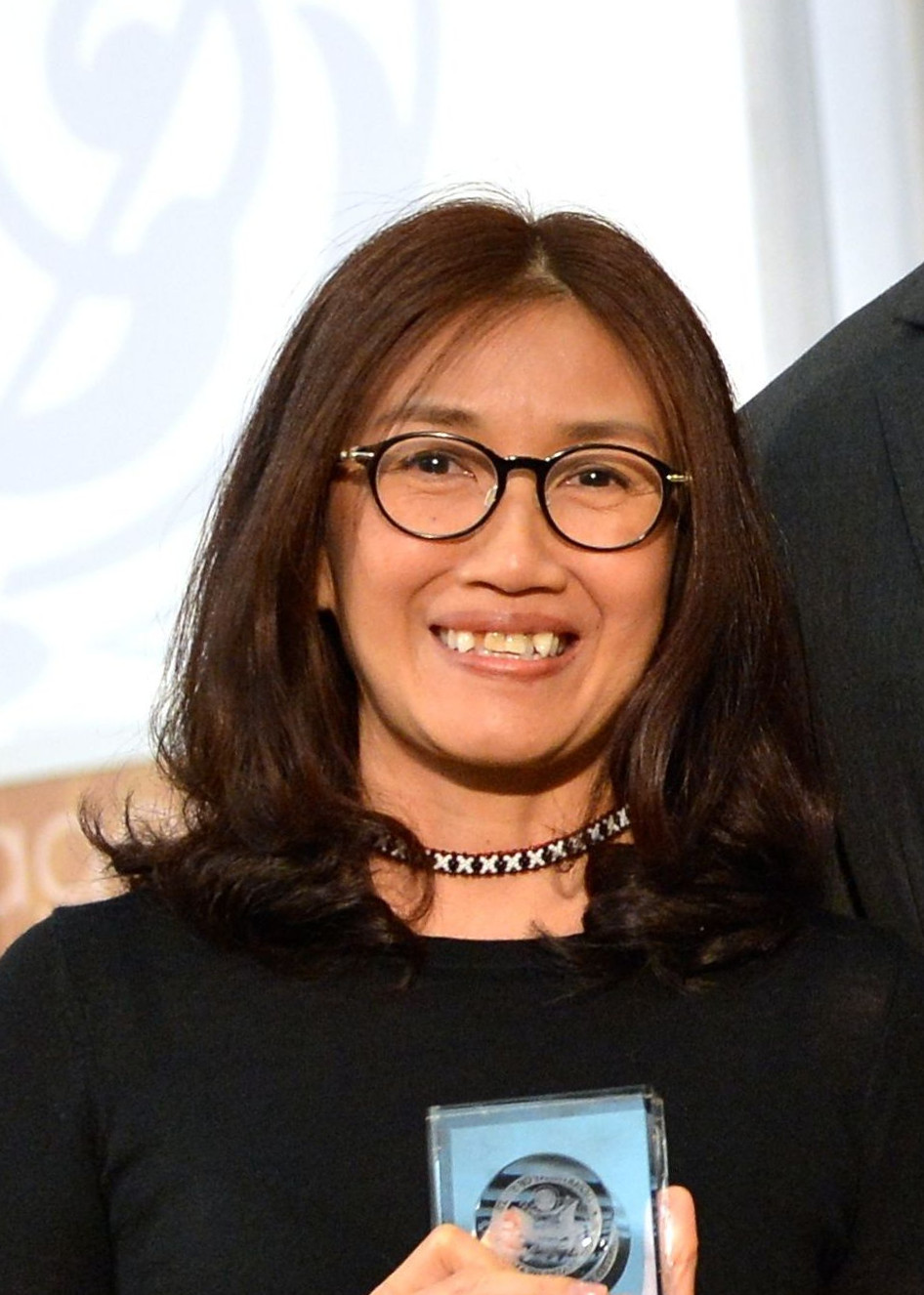
- Born: Mae Hong Son
- Occupations: Free speech activist; Conservationist; Bookstore owner
- Awards: International Women of Courage Award

Rodjaraeg Wattanapanit is a Thai free speech activist and bookstore owner. She was a co-founder of the organisation Creating Awareness for Enhanced Democracy (abbreviated CAFÉ Democracy), an organization based out of her bookstore that aims to facilitate the free exchange of ideas. In 2016 she received the International Women of Courage Award.

== Life and activism ==
Rodjaraeg is from Mae Hong Son. She graduated from Payap University in Chiang Mai, Thailand. She holds a degree in business administration. Before engaging in free speech activism, she worked to raise money for forestry conservation. She worked in this capacity for Community Forest Support Group, a non-governmental organization.

In October 2011, Rodjaraeg started the bookstore Book Re:public with Pinkaew Luangaramsri, an anthropologist at Chiang Mai University. After the 2014 Thai coup d'état, the new government forced Book Re:public to close. Wattanapanit was repeatedly brought to military camps (first Kawila Army Camp in Chiang Mai, then the Army Central Command) to pressure her to close the bookstore, and was made to sign an agreement pledging not to engage in political activity as a precondition for her release.

After one year, Rodjaraeg re-opened her bookstore, which also functioned as a forum for debate and a community center.

In 2016, Rodjaraeg won the International Women of Courage Award from the United States Department of State, making her the first Thai woman to win that award.
