= Charit Tingsabadh =

Thai economist (born 1950)

Charit Tingsabadh (Thai: จาริต ติงศภัทิย์, RTGS: Charit Tingsaphat; born 1950) is an economist and director of the Centre for European Studies at Chulalongkorn University in Bangkok.

== Education ==
Tingsabadh was educated in Thailand and at Strathallan School near Perth, Scotland. He graduated from Magdelene College, Cambridge with an economics tripos in 1971. That year he entered the University of Birmingham, graduating with a Master of Social Science in national economic planning in 1974. From 1976 to 1981 he studied for a PhD in development planning at University College London.

== Career ==
In-between postgraduate degree courses (1974–1975) Tingsabadh worked as an economist in the Regional Planning Division of the National Economic and Social Development Board in Thailand. In 1975 he began lecturing in the Faculty of Economics, and he continues to lecture at Chulalongkorn University.

Tingasabadh served as assistant director of the Social Research Institute at Chulalongkorn from 1981 to 1984. In 1986 he was appointed assistant professor in the Faculty of Economics. From 1987 to 1991 he was the deputy director of the Social Research Institute and from 1991 to 1995 he was deputy director of the Environmental Research Institute.

In 1996 he was appointed director of the Centre for Ecological Economics in the Faculty of Economics at Chulalongkorn. He also became a member of the Research Subcommittee on Forestry and Multipurpose Trees with the National Research Council.

Since 2000 he has served as director of the Centre for European Studies at Chulalongkorn. He is an advisor to the editor of the Journal of European Studies, published by the Centre for European Studies.

Tingsabadh is a member of the advisory committee to the ASEAN Energy Market Integration (AEMI) Initiative.

== Publications ==
Tingasbadh has numerous publications to his name.

- Charit Tingsabadh, ed. (2011). Fostering economic growth through low carbon initiatives in Thailand. Bangkok: Chula Global Network, Chulalongkorn University. ISBN 9786165513814.
- Francoise Nicolas; Charit Tingsabadh, eds. (2003). Unemployment in East Asia and Europe: a CAEC Task Force report Volume 2 of Cahiers d'Asie. Centre asie ifri, Institut français des relations internationales. ISBN 2865921468.
- Zainal Mantaha; Charit Tingsabadh, eds. (2003). 6th ASEF University: Asia and Europe - Towards Greater Inter-Cultural Exchanges. Bangkok: ASEF, Centre for European Studies, Chulalongkorn University.
- Charit Tingsabadh, ed. (2000). King Chulalongkorn's visit to Europe: reflections on significance and impacts. Bangkok: Centre for European Studies, Chulalongkorn University. ISBN 9747313197.
- Charit Tingsabadh (1991). Economic Study on Artificial Recharge. A & R Consultant.
- Charit Tingsabadh; Kobkul Phutaraphorn (1989). Socioeconomic Impacts of MPTS Biotechnologies on Small Farmers in the Philippines, Nepal, and Thailand. Winrock International.
- Charit Tingsabadh (1989). Employment effects of reforestation programs. Thailand Development Research Institute.
- Charit Tingsabadh (1988). Maximising development benefits from labour migration: Thailand. Asian Employment Programme (ARTEP), International Labour Organization. ISBN 9789221062424.
- C. R. Jagannathan; Charit Tingsabadh; Tata Research Energy Institute (1987). India and Thailand: social and economic effects of petroleum development. International Labour Office. ISBN 9789221055075.
- Charit Tingsabadh (1982). The Location of Manufacturing Industry in Thailand, 1972-1976. Bangkok: Social Research Institute, Chulalongkorn University.
