= Taweekiet Meenakanit =

Thai law professor and writer

Taweekiet Meenakanit (Thai: ทวีเกียรติ มีนะกนิษฐ, RTGS: Thawikiat Minakanit) is a Thai law professor and writer. He is Associate Professor at the Faculty of Law at Thammasat University in Bangkok, Thailand. Taweekiet has authored over a dozen books on Thai criminal law. He is a member of the Board for the Prevention and Suppression of Money Laundering.

Taweekiet is known for his opposition to Thai legal reforms to the crime of rape. He said allowing a man to file rape charges against a woman is an "abnormal logic" and noted that, "I can predict one day we will find a case of a bad man joining with a bad police officer to slander a woman as a rapist." He is also noted for his opposition to legal reforms that made it a crime for husbands to rape their wives in 2007. He said that "Many wives in this country still have to depend on their husbands. They might be upset by their husbands but if asked whether they want to divorce or put their husband in jail, they would say 'no'. The man might take revenge on his wife after being released from jail."
