= Fa Poonvoralak =

Thai writer

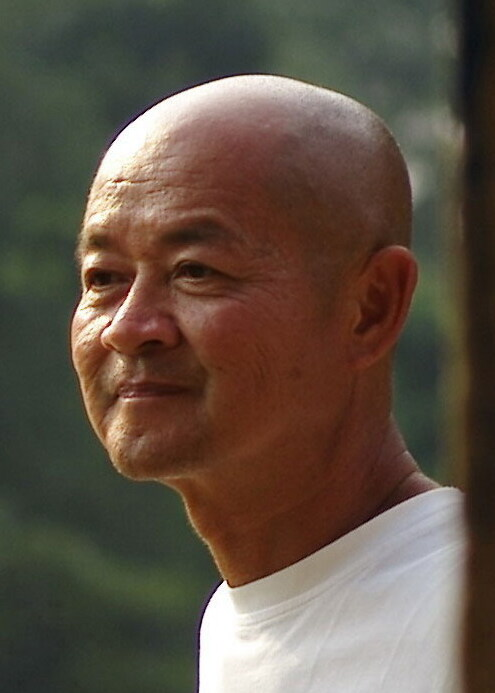
Fa Poonvoralak

Fa Poonvoralak (Thai: ฟ้า พูลวรลักษณ์, RTGS: Fa Phunworalak; born May 16, 1953) is a Thai writer. He was born in Bangkok, Thailand. His first book of poetry was published in 1972, in 2005 opened a website thaicanto.com for anyone who likes to write short poems, exchange and discuss ideas. He authored more than 10 books, including novels, poetry collections, short fiction and essay. In 2008 he studied film making, and subsequently made 7 short films and is making his first feature film from his own short story, due to be released in November 2012.

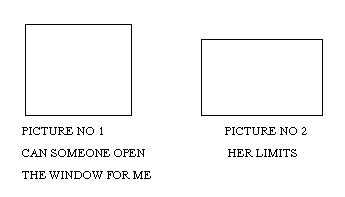
(1974)

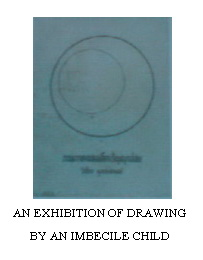
(1974)

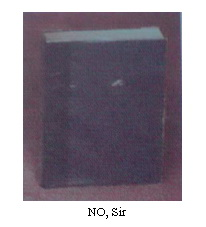
(1975)

== Conceptual Work ==
- - An exhibition of painting by that artist (1974).
- - An exhibition of drawing by an imbecile child (1974)
- - No, Sir (1975)
- - Communist Poetry (1976)
- - Fundamental fourth dimensional poems (1976)
- - E = mc^{2} (1977)
- - The experiments (1978)
- - A group of relations (1988)
- - A book of thought (1989)
- - Yes or No (1990)
- - Name certificate (1990)
- - I am eight persons (1991)
- - Name cards (1991)
- - A group program of Bueng Poonvoralak (1992)
- - A Collection of the conceptual art of Fa Poonvoralak (2003)
- - Relativity Project(2005)
- - An Exhibition of Paintings By That Artist 2005 (2005)
- - An Ancient Child Book.(2005)
- - Exhibition of his Conceptual Works on the Sky Train for 3 months (2005)

== Collection ==
- - Collections of Fa Poonvoralak (1991)

== Book ==
=== Poetry ===
- - Canto no 1. (The first book at age 19 years) (1972)
- - Baby in the womb is crying (1973)
- - Change (1973)
- - Greeting (1973)
- - Canto no. 2 (2000)
- - Canto no. 3 (2013)

=== Short Stories and Novel ===
- - The Most Silent Classroom in the World (2004)
- - Seven Short Stories of Fa (2004)
- - The Most Silent School in the World [Thai](2008)
- - 60 Short Martial Art Fictions (2009)
- - Seven Short Stories of Fa (Type No. 2) (2010)
- - twenty four Short Stories of Fa (2010)

=== Essay ===
- - The Strong Rotating of Farong Poonvoralak (1992)
- - One-dimensional Flowers in Matichon Weekly Magazine. (2003-2017)
- - books for children. New Book in Matichon Weekly Magazine.(since 2018)

== Film ==
=== Short Film (2008) ===
- - What Is Wrong With You?
- - Friend, Where Are You?
- - The Only Living Boy in New York
- - Someone Is Watching Over Me
- - Phantom of a Snake
- - Silence
- - Power of Words

=== Feature Film ===
- - Bloom (2012)

== Awards ==
- -2009 : shortlist for the S.E.A. Write (Southeast Asian Writers Award), The Most Silent School in the World. (Novel)
- -2011 : shortlist for the S.E.A. Write (Southeast Asian Writers Award), 24 Short Stories of Fa. (Short Stories)

== Notes ==
- http://www.artgazine.com/shoutouts/viewtopic.php?t=9295
- http://www.oknation.net/blog/buengpoonvoralak
