= Shaiwatna Kupratakul =

- Born: 20 September 1940; Nakhon Ratchasima, Thailand

Shaiwatna Kupratakul (Thai: ชัยวัฒน์ คุประตกุล, RTGS: Chaiwat Khupratakun; born 20 September 1940) is a Thai theoretical physicist. He is a scientist, educator, writer, translator, columnist, science communicator, producer and host of radio and television programmes. He focuses on science communication and the popularization of science through writing, radio and television media and public speaking. Kupratakul was nominated twice for the UNESCO Kalinga Prize in 1981 and 2004.

== Biography ==
Kupratakul was born to Sheng Hiang, an herb doctor, and Siew Tiang, in Nakhon Ratchasima, Thailand, on 20 September 1940. He received his primary education (Prathom 1-Prathom 6, 1949–1953) at Tesbaln 1 School (Boorapa Vidhakorn) and his secondary education (Mathayom 1-Mathayom 8, 1953–1961) at Ratchasima Vidhyalai School, both in Nakhon Ratchasima. He attended Chulalongkorn University at the Faculty of Science for one-and-a-half years, from 1961–1962. In 1962, Kupratakul won a Columbo Plan scholarship, from the Australian Government, to study physics in Australia. He graduated with a BSc (Honours) in Physics from Monash University in 1966, and a PhD (Physics), also from Monash University, in 1970.

Since returning to Thailand, Kupratakul has worked as a lecturer, university administrator, and educational development project committee member or leader. He has also written non-fiction and fiction works with the aim of educating people in the area of science. He met Isaac Asimov in New York in November 1977, and Arthur C. Clarke at Colombo, Sri Lanka, in February 1980. In 1977, Kupratakul visited Princeton, Albert Einstein's last residence. His science writing is inspired by Isaac Asimov, Arthur C. Clarke, Jules Verne, H.C. Wells and Juntri Siriboonrod (จันตรี ศิริบุญรอด); the last of whom was proclaimed "Father of Thai Science Fiction."

Kupratakul worked in the Department of Physics, first at Khon Kaen University from 1970–1982, and then at Srinakharinwirot University (Prasarnmit) from 1982–1999. He retired in 1999, but continues to give talks at universities, schools and for the public. He also write articles and science fiction (both short science stories and science novels), hosts radio and television programmes, and serves as a committee member of several academic and national Councils.

Kupratakul married Shusri Chulusthira in 1968. They have a son (Juckrich) and a daughter (Chollada). He remarried Sansiri Chairat in 1999.

=== Administrative duties ===
Kupratakul's administrative duties have included:

- Head of Department of Physics, Khon Kaen University, during 1970–1976 and 1978–1982.
- Assistant Dean of Faculty of Science, Khon Kaen University, during 1974–1978.
- Head of Department of Physics, Srinakharinwirot (Prasammit), during 1983–1985.
- Assistant Dean of Faculty of Science, Srinakharinwiot University, during 1983–1985.

=== Professional appointments and activities ===
Kupratakul has also participated in the following activities:

- Assistant Professor of Physics, during 1974–1981
- Associate Professor of Physics, since 1981.
- Executive committee member, Asian Physical Society, (APSO), 1979.
- Vice-President, Asian Science Communicators Organization, (ASCO), 1980.
- Member, the Science Society of Thailand, since 1972.
- Member, the Writers’ Association of Thailand, since 1976.
- Member, P.E.N. International Thailand Center, since 1976.
- Chairman, Science Writers’ and Publishers’ Group of Thailand, 1984.
- Executive board member, National Research Council of Thailand, since 2003.
- Chairman, Physical Science and Mathematical Branch, the Office of the National Research Council of Thailand, since 2003.
- Committee member, Academic University Council, Rajabhat University Nakhon Ratchasima, 2005–2008.

=== Publication ===
Kupratakul wrote, edited, and translated in a variety of formats including articles, essays, short stories, novels and textbooks. He wrote on both science and non-science subjects for audiences of all ages. More than 100 books, written or translated, have been published. Kupratakul has also published under the pen names of Shaikupt, Tachyon, Watanachai, and Sriwat.

== Radio and television ==
Kupratakul has hosted, produced, or served as commentator for several radio programmes, in Khon Kaen (1970–1982) and in Bangkok (since 1982). These programmes were usually focused on science communication and involved direct interaction with audiences.

Examples of the radio programs are: Science and You (วิทยาศาสตร์และท่าน), Life and Universe (ชีวิตกับจักรวาล), Life and Science (ชีวิตกับวิทยาศาสตร์), Colorful Life With Science (สีสันชีวิตกับวิทยาศาสตร์), Scientific Wisdom (ภูมิปัญญากับวิทยาศาสตร์), For the Future (สาระเพื่ออนาคต).

On television, Kupratakul has hosted, co-hosted, or produced programmes at Khon Kaen national television station (Channel 5 Khon Kaen), 1970–1982, and in Bangkok starting in 1982.. These television appearances are also focused on communicating and popularizing science to the general public.

Examples of the television programmes hosted by Kupratakul are: Science And You (วิทยาศาสตร์และท่าน), Keeping Up With World Progress (ทันโลกก้าวหน้า), Science And Life Update (ทันโลก ทันชีวิต), The Path Of The Future (วิถีอนาคต).

== Research fields ==
Kupatakul's major research interests are the energy band structures of noble metals, the pressure effects of noble metals on the energy of band structures, and solar energy. His Ph.D. thesis was titled, "The Electron Band Structures Calculation of Gold By The APW Method". His Ph.D. research was published in 1969–1970 (see external links).

== Awards and prizes ==
Kupatakul has received the following awards and prizes:

- Outstanding Science Communicator Award for the year 1995 from the Science Society of Thailand Under the Patronage of His Majesty the King.
- “Surintaraja” Award for the year 2009 from the Translators and Interpreters Association of Thailand (TIAT). An award for outstanding senior translator.
- The book “Immortal Life” (ชีวิตอมตะ), winner of two consolation prizes for non-fiction book for young readers, National Book Fair (Thailand) and The National Youth Bureau (Thailand), both in 1982.
- The book “Laser” (เลเซอร์) winner of a consolation prize for non-fiction book for young readers, National Book Fair (Thailand), 1986.
- The book “Amazing Space” (อวกาศมหัศจรรย์), winner of a consolation prize for illustrated book for children, National Book Fair (Thailand), 1997.
- The book “Project X” (โปรเจกต์เอกซ์), winner of a consolation prize for novel, National Book Fair (Thailand), 2003.

== Honours and recognition ==
Kupatakuln has received national and international honours and recognition:

- Outstanding alumnus (ศิษย์เก่าดีเด่น) of Ratchasima Vidhayalai School, 1997
- Outstanding alumnus (ศิษย์เก่าดีเด่น) of Tesabaln 1 (Boorapa Vidhayalai) School, 2005.
- Presenter of a TV spot promoting Thailand National Science Week Events, 2000, broadcast during the month of August 2000.

== Works ==
- Kupratakuln, S. and G. C. Fletcher (1969) Electron band structure of gold. J. Phys. C: Solid State Phys. 2, p. 1886-1887.
- Kupratakuln, S. (1970) Relativistic electron band structure of gold. J. Phys. C: Solid State Phys. 3, p. S109-S119.
