= Jintana Kaewkao =

Thai activist

- Born: 1962 (age 63–64); Prachaub Khiri Khan, Kingdom of Thailand
- Occupations: Environmental activist; shop owner

Jintana Kaewkao (Thai: จินตนา แก้วขาว; RTGS: Chintana Kaeokhao, born 1962) is an environmental activist from Thailand. She is known for her activism against the building of power plants in her coastal village Ban Krut, Prachaub Khiri Khan, Thailand.

== Early life ==
In 1982, at 20 years old, Kaewkao moved to Ban Krut. She married a local man, opened a small grocery store, and had 3 children. In her earlier years, Kaewkao was not well-known for her activism, but continued to be involved in anti-power plant movements.

== Powerplant conflict with Union Power Development Company Ltd ==
In 1998, the Union Power Development Company Ltd. (UPDC) developed a project to build a coal-fired power plant in Ban Krut. This project received funding from foreign investors from the USA, Hong Kong, and Japan. It would allow for the development of a tourist resort in Ban Krut, whilst the company would cut down 10,000 coconut trees and develop a 1.4 GW coal power-plant.

The project was proposed to satisfy Thailand’s increasing energy demands. Analysts have explained that coal has been viewed by the Thai government as a way of creating enough energy for the country, as natural gas on its own has not been enough to keep up with its development.

=== Local response to power plant ===
The project received a mixed response from villagers. For some, the coal power-plant would lead to an increase in electricity and more jobs for villagers. Kaewkao viewed the plant as a destruction of their environment through harming villagers’ health, marine life, coastal coral, livestock and crops. She expressed concern that the power-plant would also impact the villagers' source of income through fishing.

=== Kaewkao’s movement ===
In order to fight back against UPDC, Kaewkao went to nearby villages, gathered villagers in markets, and urged them to sign petitions against the development of the power plant. In 1998, she organized a march on the South Highway with the people of Prachaub Khiri Khan. In 2001, she took supporters into UPDC headquarters. She also purchased UPDC’s stocks to voice her opinion as a shareholder.

Kaewkao’s movement blocked the development of the project. In 2004, the construction ceased. Kaewkao and her supporters won the court case against UPDC. Currently, there remains abandoned buildings where the project was to take place. Kaewkao proceeded to negotiate land rights to ensure that Ban Krut would be protected from future power-plant projects.

=== Government and legal responses ===
In the early 2000s, Kaewkao was taken to court by UPDC for her activism. Upon the Criminal Court dropping the case, UPDC appealed and Kaewkao was sentenced to six months in prison, which was later reduced to four months. In 2005, Kaewkao was convicted by the Supreme Court of Thailand for trespassing on UPDC’s private property. Kaewkao has continued to be imprisoned for her activism against government and corporate executives.

Throughout the years, Kaewkao has also faced physical and life-threatening violence. In 2001, 2002, 2008, and 2009, she was attacked by gunmen in her village. She then sent her children to stay with relatives.

== Local and international recognition ==
Kaewkao’s environmental activism has led to local and international recognition. She is currently the leader of the Natural Preservation Network of Bo Nok and Hin Krut, a community-based environmental justice group, and founder of Ban Krut Conservation Group. She has inspired photographer Luke Duggleby to focus his work on environmentalism. She has also been internationally recognized by Asian Human Rights Commission and Greenpeace.
