= Thanik Lertcharnrit =

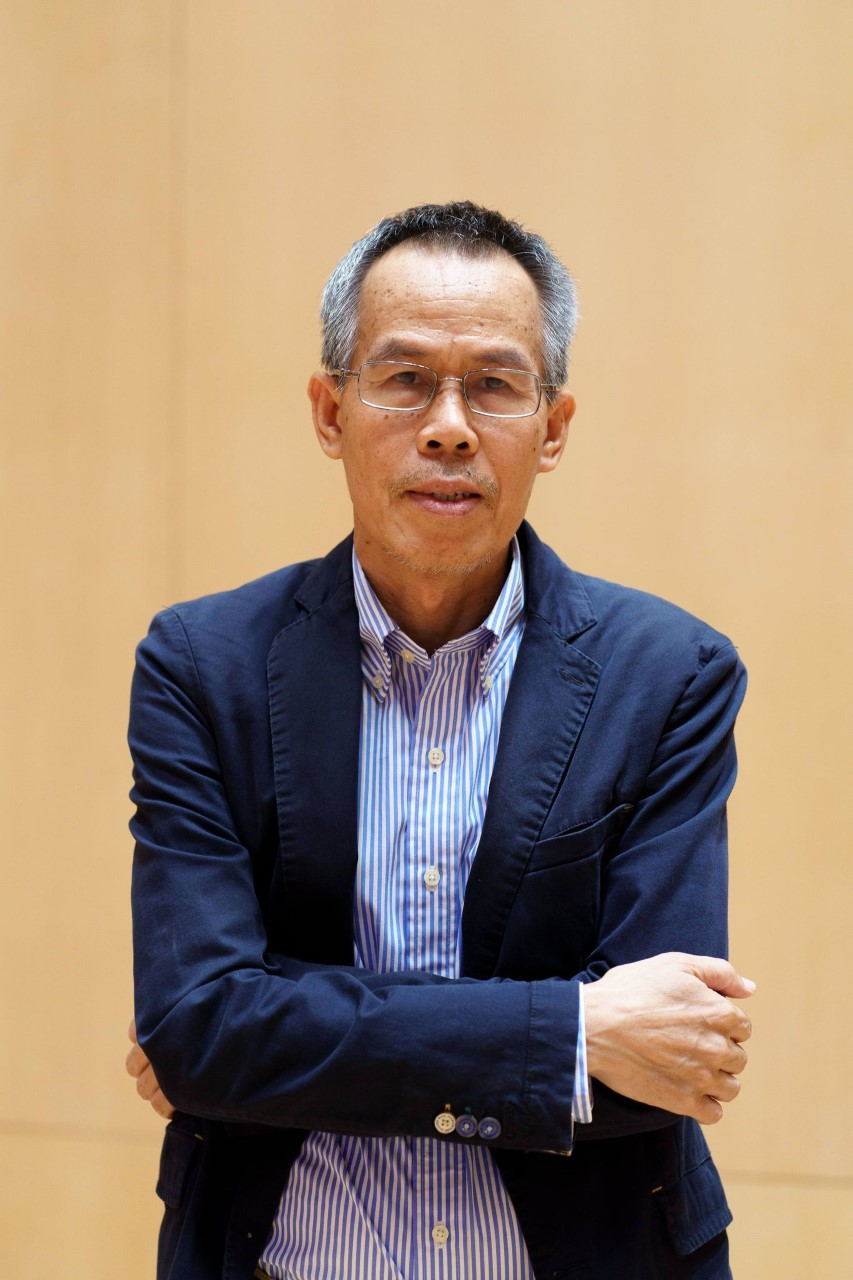
Thanik Lercharnrit

Thanik Lertcharnrit (Thai: ธนิก เลิศชาญฤทธ์, RTGS: Thanik Loetchanrit, formerly Sawang Lercharnrit; born 1964) is a Thai Archeologist and Anthropologist and Professor at Silpakorn University. He specializes in southeast Asian archaeology and the public education and perception of archeology, with a focus on public Thai cultural heritage. Professor Lertcharnrit has made many contributions to the field of Cultural Resource Management (CRM), and acted as a pioneering figure and advocate for global public archaeology.

== Early life ==
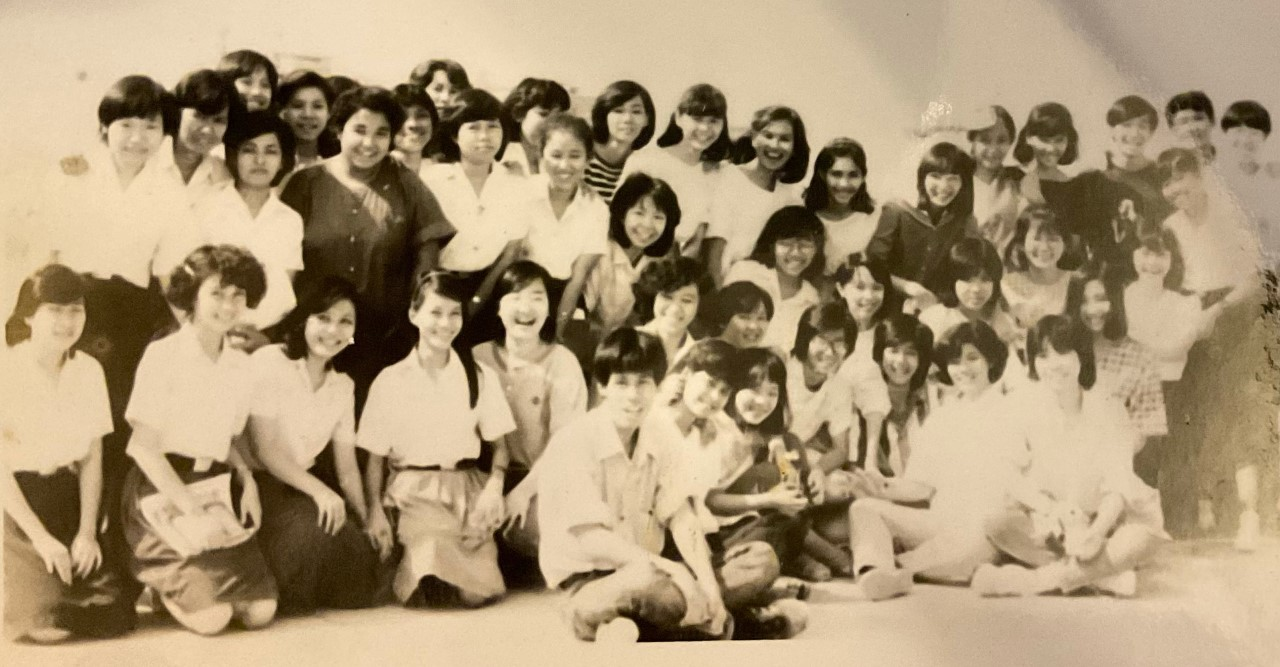
Thanik Lertcharnrit with colleagues at Silpakorn University

Thanik Lertcharnrit rose from humble beginnings to become a leader in southeast Asian archaeology and one of the first native Thai scholars to earn a Ph.D. in archaeology. As documented in interviews and transcripts focusing on leaders in archaeology and Cultural Resource Management (CRM), Professor Lertcharnrit was born in a rural Thai village in the province of Khon Kaen in 1964. Being born into a farming family in the poorest region of Thailand, his father encouraged him to go to university so he could live a better life. After going to the elementary school in his village he went to a different district for Matthayom Ton (junior high school) and Matthayom Plai (high school), spending 11th and 12th grade at the demonstration school in Khon Kaen University. After graduating from Matthayom Plai he wanted to be able to go to university in Bangkok, and though it was very expensive to live there his father said he would sell their cattle and land in order to allow him to afford to live there. While searching for universities there he came across Silpakorn University, and decided to pursue entrance into their archeology program and attempt to pass it's very competitive entrance exam. He decided on pursuing an archeology degree due to the many archeological sites around his village, a fact that would allow him to return to work there while also being one of the first archeologists from the northeast of Thailand. After passing the entrance exam he fell in love with archeology, managing to graduate from Silpakorn in three and a half years in 1985.

== Research and career ==
Following his graduation from Silpakorn, Lertcharnrit secured a job as a government officer and was assigned to the Pattani province. Working with the locals present there, he excavated historic sites of the Dvaravati period in the ancient city of Yarang. This continued for a total of eight years until he was informed by one of his former professors at Silpakorn University of a scholarship to enroll at a master's program in one of five foreign countries (USA, England, France, Australia, and Canada), though there was only one available position for archeology students. Managing to pass the exam to he decided to study in the United States, a choice that came along with the requirement to study Cultural Resource Management as part of the PHD program. When deciding what school he wanted to go to Lertcharnrit decided to apply for Washington State University and Ohio State University, choosing to accept enrollment into Washington State university due to the important status of one of the professors, William D. Lipe, in the field of cultural resource management. William D. Lipe would later become Lertcharnrit's advisor upon his enrolment. Graduation from Washington State University with a master's degree in archeology and anthropology, Lertcharnrit went on to get his PhD in 2001. Following this in 2003 Lertcharnrit was hired as an assistant professor at Silpakorn University in their archeology program, and as worked there as an assistant professor until 2006 when he became an associate professor.

== Contributions to archaeology ==
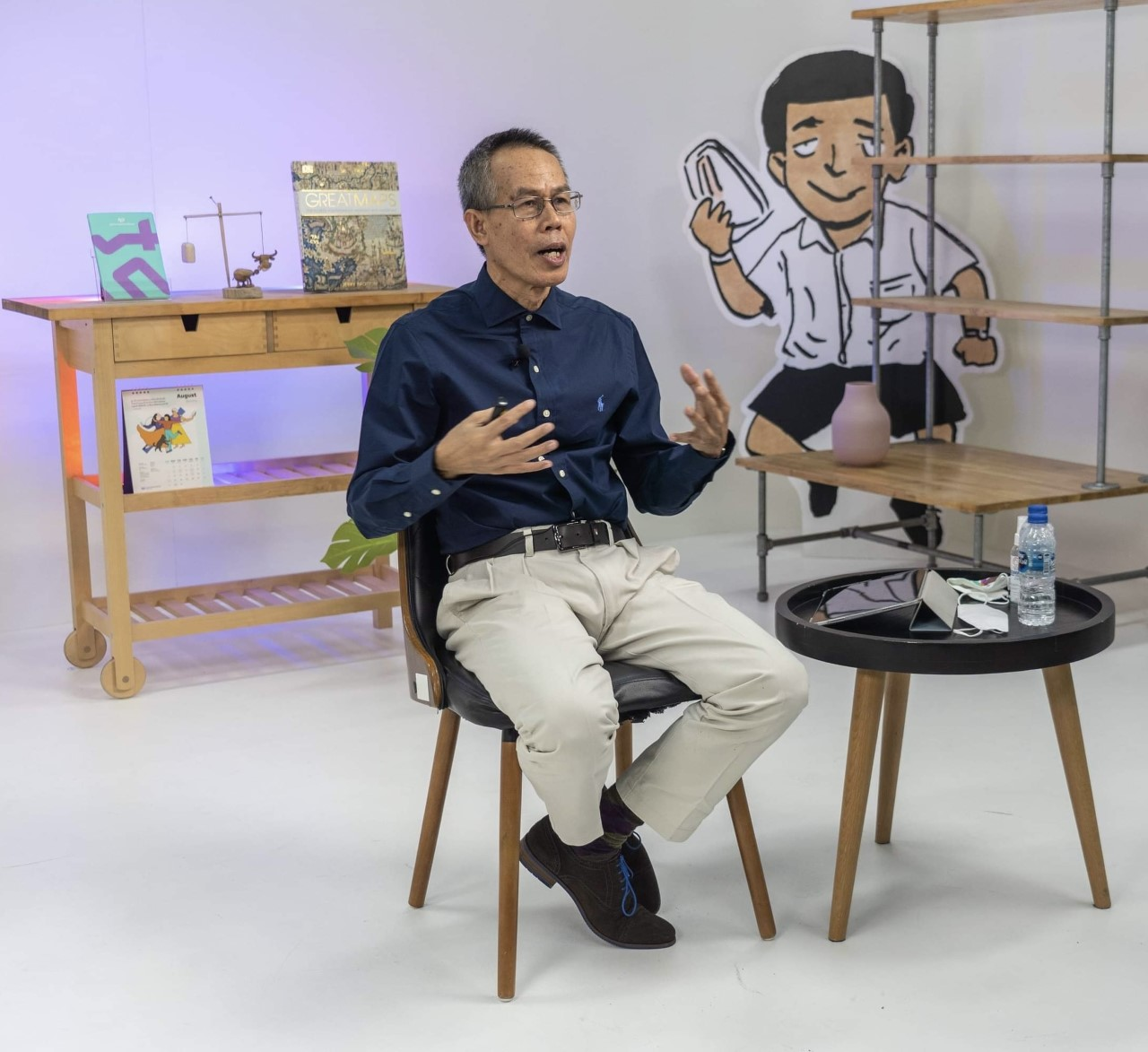
Thanik Lertcharnrit at Princess Sirindhorn Anthropology Centre

Thanik Lertcharnrit is known for his contributions to the field of cultural resource management, public archaeology, and the advances he has brought in the field of Thai archeology. Lertcharnrit wrote the first book in the Thai language on cultural resource management, and translated the first book on human evolution. His translation of Kenneth Feder's (2003) book, "The Past in Perspective: An Introduction to Human Prehistory" was a major accomplishment that brought modern archaeological research to a Thai audience. His status as a leader in southeast Asian CRM led to his being asked to serve as an editor for the substantial Encyclopedia of Global Archaeology, and to author a seminal work on Thai CRM. Thailand: Cultural Heritage Management. Lertcharnrit has sought to pioneer the use of multiple scientific methods in Thai archeology, in addition to getting the local communities involved in the preservation and conservation of archeological sites. He is involved with numerous interdisciplinary research collaborations with global scholars, as exemplified by his work with American archaeologists from Eckerd College and North Carolina State University at the Promtin Tai site, a historic and prehistoric cemetery in central Thailand. He is a recognized expert on Thai archaeology, and has worked on diverse projects and excavations in central Thailand for more than thirty years. Professor Lertcharnrit presents the results of his research to both academic and public audiences, in both Thai and English. His topical interests are diverse and include the development of complexity in southeast Asia, metallurgy, mortuary studies, isotope analysis, shell production and exchange, among other topics.

== Awards and recognitions ==
Dr. Lertcharnrit has received numerous research grants and scholarly awards from Silpakorn University, Washington State University, the Princess Maha Chakri Sirindhorn Anthropology Centre (Thailand), Royal Thai Government Scholarships, and public and private foundations. He has also received numerous international visiting scholar awards from the University of Otago, New Zealand, the National Science Foundation, North Carolina State University, Swedish Institute (Sweden), the French Ministry of Foreign Affairs, France, German Academic Exchange Service Fellowship (Germany).

Other key awards include the Outstanding New Researcher Award, Thailand Research Fund (2007), Translation Grant, American Council of Learned Societies, USA (2006), Sigma-Xi Grants-in-Aid of Research, The Scientific Research Society, USA (2000), Phyllis and Richard Daugherty Scholarship for Graduate Student Excellence, Department of Anthropology, Washington State University, USA (1998), The Prince of Songkla University Foundation Research Grant (1992).

In 2016, Dr. Lertcharnrit received a prestigious Fulbright Award for the project, Agricultural Stability and Instability in Prehistoric Central Thailand. This award led to a visiting scholarship at Washington State University, which focused on questions including " (1) When did rice and millet agriculture first arrive in Central Thailand?, (2) Did rice agriculture spread to Thailand from East Asia or from India?, (3) How did humans respond to and adapt their agricultural systems in the face of climatic changes over the past 2,000 years?, and (4) What were the climatic conditions that early agriculturalists in Thailand faced?". This work led to important publications on paleoethnobotany, including "Three Thousand Years of Farming Strategies in Central Thailand."

== Select publications ==
=== Thai publications ===
- Archaeological Evidence of Prehistoric Diseases: A Review. To be published in 2021 in a volume published by Princess Sirindhorn Anthropology Centre. (Peer Reviewed)
- 2019: Imported and Exported Trade Goods: Archaeological Evidence from Central Thailand. Journal of Anthropology Sirindhorn Anthropology Centre 2(2): 119-147. (Peer Reviewed)
- 2018: Anatomically Modern Humans in Southeast Asia: Fossil and Archaeological Records. Journal of Anthropology Sirindhorn Anthropology Centre 1(1): 5-41. (Peer Reviewed)
- 2017: Challenging the Agricultural Transition Models of Prehistoric Human Health Change: Insights from Infants and Children from Southeast Asia. Art and Culture 38(7): 24-27.
- 2017: Prehistoric Ceramics in Thailand. Bangkok: Museum Press. (Peer Reviewed)
- 2016: Cultural Resource Management, 2nd Edition. Bangkok: Princess Sirindhorn Anthropology Centre. (Peer Reviewed)
- 2013: Dental Paleopathology of Iron Age Humans from Phromthin Tai, Central Thailand. Silpakorn Journal 36(6):28-33. (first author, with Scott Kirkland and Scott Burnet).
- 2012: People and Pots: Origins of Pottery. Veridian E-Journal 5(3)
- 2011:Cultural Resource Management. Bangkok: Princess Sirindhorn Anthropology Centre.
- 2010: Recent Research on Iron Age Stone and Glass Beads from Phromthin Tai, Lopburi. Muang Boran Journal 36(4):53-68. (first author, with Alison Carter).
- 2009: Early Clay Coins or Game Pieces Art and Culture 31(1): 50-55.
- 2009: Ancient Ornaments from Central Thailand. Sarakadee 25(298): 26-30.
- 2009: Beads and People in the Past. Matichon Weekly 29(1495): 75-76.
- 2008: Trade in Antiquity: A New Face of International Crime. Sarakadee 24(286): 26-30.
- 2008: Public Perception and Opinion about Archaeology: A Case Study in a Village of Central Thailand. Muang Boran Journal 34(3):95-108. (first author, with Santhawee Niyomsup)
- 2008: Roots of Humankind. Bangkok: Chulalongkorn University Press. (Peer Reviewed)
- 2007: Zoomorphic Spouts from Promtin, Central Thailand. Art & Culture 28(8): 38-43.
- 2007: Tracing Human Origins. Bangkok: Sarakadee Press.
- 2006: Late Prehistory in Thailand: Recent Evidence from the Central Region. Silpakorn Journal 49(5):16-31.
- 2006: Ancient Diseases and Health. Art & Culture 27(8): 38-41.
- 2005: Ritual and Craft Specialization. Silpakorn Journal 48(3): 5-13. (peer reviewed)
- 2004: Foreign Trader or Local Elite? New Evidence from a Late Prehistoric Site in Central Thailand. Art & Culture 25(9): 38-41.
- 2004: Archaeology: Method and Theory. Bangkok: Princess Sirindhorn Anthropology Centre. (Peer Reviewed)
- 2003: Man and Stone: Raw Material Availability and Stone Tool Production Organization during the Late Pleistocene and Early Holocene Periods in Thailand. Silpakorn University Journal 12(2): 134-160. (second author, with Chawalit Khaokhiew) (peer reviewed)
- 2003: Archaeology of the Marginal Area of Central Thailand. Kuam Ru Kue Prateep1/46: 2-7.
- 2003: Late Prehistoric Central Thailand: Evidence from the Lower Pa Sak River Valley and the Central Highland. Muang Boran Journal 29(2): 72-87.
- 2003: The Past as Told by Small Old Things. Bangkok: Buraphasarn.
- 2002: The Chronological Order of Archaeological Sites in the Pa Sak River Valley, Central Thailand: A View from Ceramic Seriation. Silpakorn Journal 45(3): 59-75. (peer reviewed)
- 2001: Sab Champa 2001: Archaeological Fieldwork and Results. Muang Boran Journal 27(3): 117-133. (first author, with Preeyanuch Jumprom and Anan Klinpoklab)
- 2001: The Management of Chaco Culture National Historical Park, New Mexico. Muang Boran Journal 27(2): 39-46.
- 1999: Prehistory of Thailand: 12 Years after Chin Youdi. Muang Boran Journal 25(1): 99-111.
- 1997: Ceramic Art in Thailand. Bangkok: Rung Ruang Publishing. (Second author, with Pariwat Thammapreechakorn and Krisda Pinsri)
- 1993: Thai-Muslim Domestic Houses. In Thai Houses, edited by M.C. Subhadradis Diskul, pp. 209–231. Bangkok: Office of National Identity.
- 1991: European Ceramics Found in Pattani. Art & Culture 12(12): 104-110.
- 1989: Folk Crafts of Southern Thailand. Bangkok: Chomromdek.
- 1988: Archaeological Research on the History of Pattani: Some Preliminary Conclusions. Journal of the Historical Society 10: 159-179. (first author, with David J. Welch and Judith R. McNeill)
- 1987: Problems Concerning the Preservation of Ancient Monuments in the Border Provinces of Southern Thailand. Rusamilae 11(1): 44-47.
- 1986: New Data on Yarang Archaeological Site in Pattani, Southern Thailand. Art & Culture 7(12): 32-35.

=== English publications ===
- 2020: Three Thousand Years of Farming Strategies in Central Thailand. Antiquity 94(376): 966-982. (third author, with Jade d’Alpoim Guedes, Sydney Hanson, Andrew Weiss, Vincent C. Pigott, Charles F. W. Higham, Thomas F. G. Higham, and Steven A. Weber).
- 2020: Heritage Management, Education, and Community Involvement in Thailand: A Central Thai Community Case. Journal of Community Archaeology & Heritage 7(3): 187-197. (firstauthor, with Nannaphat Niyomsap).
- 2019: Ethical Issues in Southeast Asian Bioarchaeology. In Ethical Approaches to Human Remains: A Global Challenge in Bioarchaeology and Forensic Anthropology, edited by K. Squires, D. Errickson, and N. Marquez-Grant, pp. 465 – 484. New York: Springer. (third author, with S. Halcrow, R. Crozier, J. Newton, L. Shewan, and S. Ward)
- 2019: The Wet and The Dry, The Wild and The Cultivated: Subsistence and Risk Management in Ancient Central Thailand. Archaeological and Anthropological Sciences 11(12): 6473-6484. (fifth author, with Jade d’Alpoim Guedes, Sydney Hanson, Charles Higham, and Tom Higham)
- 2017: Archaeological Heritage Management in Thailand. American Anthropologist 119(1): 134-136.
- 2014: Phromthin Tai: An Archaeological Perspective on Its Societal Transition In Before Siam: Essays in Art and Archaeology, edited by Nicolas Revire and Stephen Murphy, pp. 118–131. Bangkok: River Books.
- 2014: Cultural Heritage Management in Thailand. In Encyclopedia of Global Archaeology, edited by Claire Smith, New York: Springer.
- 2014: Charoenwongsa, Pisit. In Encyclopedia of Global Archaeology, edited by Claire Smith, New York: Springer.
- 2011: Zoomorphic Spouts from Central Thailand. Bulletin of the Indo-Pacific Prehistory Association 31: 30-36.
- 2010: An Early Ivory Bracelet from Central Thailand. Expedition 52(2): 8.
- 2010: Archaeological Resource Management in Thailand. In Heritage Resource Management, Policies and Issues in Global Perspective, edited by Phyllis M. Messenger and George S. Smith, pp. 176–187. Gainesville: University Press of Florida.
- 2010: Heritage Values and Meanings in Contemporary Thailand. In Heritage Values in Contemporary Society edited by George S. Smith, Phyllis M. Messenger, and Hilary A. Soderland, pp. 279–285. Walnut Creek, CA: Left Coast Press.
- 2006: The Moated Site of Promtin Tai and the Transition from Late Prehistory to Early History in Central Thailand. In Uncovering Southeast Asia's Past, edited by Elisabeth Bacus, Ian Glover, and Vincent Pigott, pp. 257–264. Singapore: Singapore University Press.
- 2004: Sab Champa Revisited: Results of Recent Archaeological Field Investigations. In Southeast Asian Archaeology: Wilhelm G. Solheim II Festschrift, edited by Victor Paz, pp. 504–521. Quezon City: University of the Philippines Press.
- 2004: Late Prehistoric and Early Historic Archaeology in the Central Highland of Thailand: Excavation at the Site of Sab Champa. Antiquity 78(299). (Online at http://antiquity.ac.uk/ProjGall/lertrit/index.html)
- 2003: Ceramic Vessels from Chaibadan, Lopburi, and the Later Prehistory of Central Thailand. Bulletin of the Indo-Pacific Prehistory Association 23: 27-33.
- 2003: On Chronology-Building for Central Thailand through an Attributed-Based Ceramic Seriation. Asian Perspectives 42(1): 41-71.
- 2002: Some Notes on the Recent Archaeological Excavations in the Lower Pa Sak River Valley. Silpakorn University International Journal 2(1): 119-135.
- 2000: Cultural Resource Management and Archaeology of Chiang Saen, Northern Thailand. Journal of Southeast Asian Studies 31(1): 137-161.
