= List of Thai film directors =

This list of Thai film directors is incomplete. Please help by adding to it. It is customary for Thais to be grouped by their given name, not their family name, even if they have taken a Western name.

== A ==
- Aditya Assarat
- Anocha Suwichakornpong
- Apichatpong Weerasethakul
- Areeya Sirisopha

== B ==
- Banjong Pisonthanakun
- Bhandit Rittakol

== C ==
- Chatrichalerm Yukol
- Cherd Songsri
- Chukiat Sakweerakul

== E ==
- Ekachai Uekorngtham
- Euthana Mukdasanit

== H ==
- Haeman Chatemee

== J ==
- Jira Maligool

== K ==
- Kongdej Jaturanrasamee
- Kittikorn Liasirikun
- Kongkiat Khomsiri

== M ==
- Michael Shaowanasai
- Mingmongkol Sonakul
- Mitr Chaibancha
- Monthon Arayangkoon

== N ==
- Nontawat Numbenchapol
- Nonzee Nimibutr
- Nithiwat Tharathorn

== P ==
- Pakphum Wonjinda
- Pang Brothers
- Panna Rittikrai
- Parkpoom Wongpoom
- Payut Ngaokrachang
- Pen-Ek Ratanaruang
- Petchtai Wongkamlao
- Pimpaka Towira
- Pisut Praesangeam
- Poj Arnon
- Prachya Pinkaew

== R ==
- Ratchapoom Boonbunchachoke
- Rattana Pestonji

== S ==
- Sompote Sands
- Somtow Sucharitkul
- Songyos Sugmakanan
- Suthep Po-ngam

== T ==
- Thanit Jitnukul
- Thunska Pansittivorakul

== V ==
- Vichit Kounavudhi

== W ==
- Wisit Sasanatieng
- Wych Kaosayananda

== Y ==
- Youngyooth Thongkonthun
- Yuthlert Sippapak
