= Surojana Sethabutra =

Thai ceramic artist (born 1956)

Surojana Sethabutra (Thai: สุโรจนะ เศฐบุตร, RTGS: Surotchana Sethabut; born 1956) is a Thai ceramic artist. An MFA from Kansas State University, Surojana's work tries to break the traditional mold of Thai ceramics into new forms. She specializes in hand building. She is a member of Womanifesto, an international woman's art exchange.

Surojana is married to a Thai architect and has one daughter, Som-O.
