= Pichaet Wiriyachitra =

Pharmaceutical company CEO

- พิเชษฐ์ วิริยะจิตรา
- Born: 27 July 1944 (age 82); Bangkok, Thailand
- Education: University of Western Australia; University of Tasmania
- Scientific career
- Fields: Organic chemistry; Food chemistry

Pichaet Wiriyachitra (Thai: พิเชษฐ์ วิริยะจิตรา, RTGS: Phichet Wiriyachitra; born 27 July 1944) is a former professor of chemistry at Prince of Songkla University. He has specialized in the development of pharmaceuticals from natural products, particularly Xanthone from Mangosteen. He is also Chairman and CEO of Asian Phytoceuticals Public Co., Ltd.

== Biography ==
Wiriyachitra was born 27 July 1944 in Bangkok. He attended Suankularb Wittayalai School and Triam Udom Suksa School, and received a B.Sc, Hons., from the University of Western Australia, and a Ph.D, Organic Chemistry from the University of Tasmania. He followed this with Post-doctoral Fellowships at the University of Connecticut and University of Pennsylvania. Subsequently he held the posts of Lecturer, Assistant Professor, Associate Professor, and Professor of Chemistry at Prince of Songkla University, also becoming the Vice President and Dean of Graduate School. He has been a Guest Scientist at the Japan Society for the Promotion of Science and the German Cancer Research Center.

In 1988 he founded the Natural Cosmetic Research Company, which changed its name to Asian Phytoceuticals Public Co., Ltd. in 2005.

== Mangosteen research ==
He leads a scientific team at the Mangosteen Research and Development Center (Thailand) called Operation BIM who have been doing research since 1977.
