= Kanok Koryangphueak =

Thai footballer (born 1989)

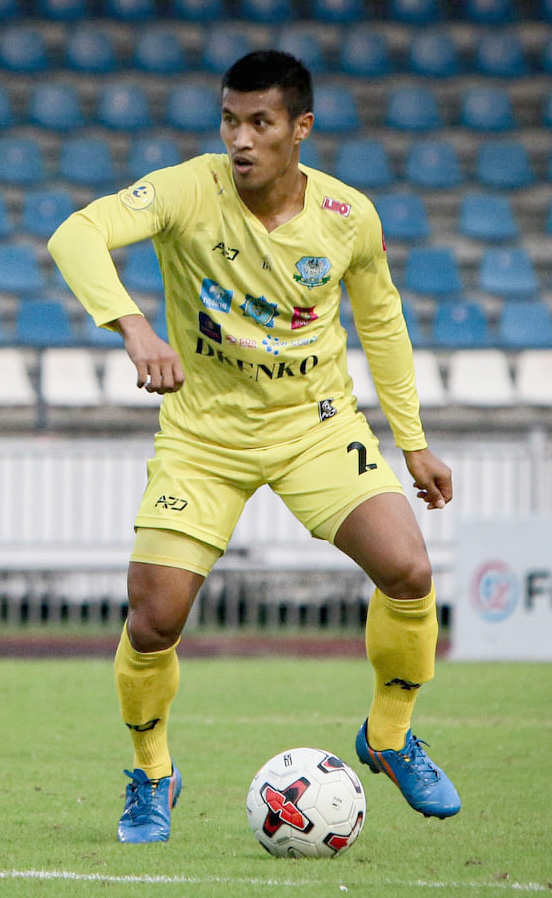

Personal information
- Full name: Kanok Koryangphueak
- Date of birth: 25 September 1989 (age 37)
- Place of birth: Thailand
- Height: 1.69 m (5 ft 6 1/2 in)
- Position: Left back

Team information
- Current team: No Club
- Number: 2

Senior career*
Years	Team	Apps	(Gls)
2015–2019	Army United	15	(0)
2019	→ Kasetsart (loan)	7	(0)
2020–2021	MOF Customs United	28	(0)
2021	Muang Loei United	10	(1)
2022	Customs Ladkrabang United	7	(0)
2022–2023	Kasetsart	0	(0)
2023–	No Club		
- * Club domestic league appearances and goals

Kanok Koryangphueak (Thai: กนก เกาะยางเผือก, RTGS: Kanok Koyangphueak; born September 25, 1989) is a Thai professional footballer who plays as a left back.
