= Supasawad Chardchawarn =

- ศุภสวัสดิ์ ชัชวาลย์
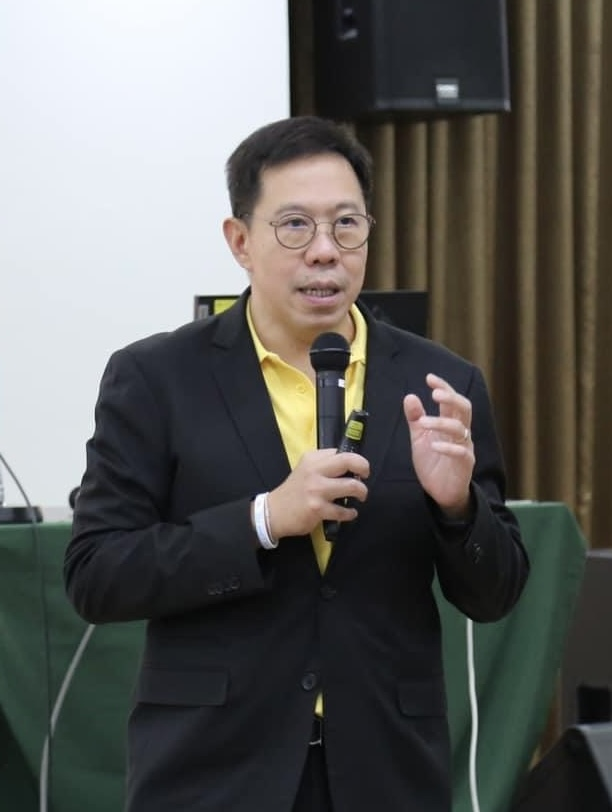

Rector of Thammasat University
- Incumbent
- Assumed office 23 September 2024
- Preceded by: Gasinee Witoonchart

Personal details
- Education: Thammasat University (BA); University of Birmingham (MSc); Kobe University (PhD)

Supasawad Chardchawarn (Thai: ศุภสวัสดิ์ ชัชวาลย์, RTGS: Suphasawat Chachawan) is a Thai academic administrator who has served as the rector of Thammasat University since 2024. Supasawad's research focuses on comparative local government in Thailand and the United Kingdom.

== Career ==
Supasawad served as dean of Faculty of Political Science at Thammasat University from 2013 to 2018.
