= Patima Jeerapaet =

Thai businessman (born 1967)

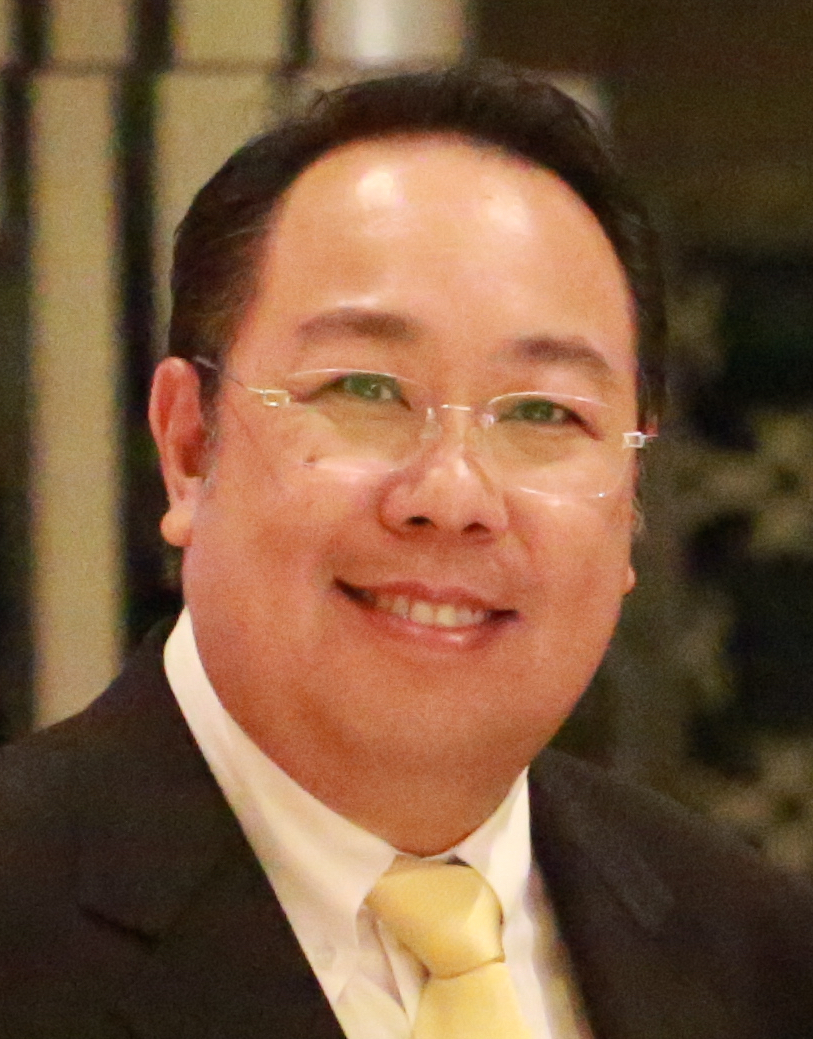
- Born: 15 March 1967 (age 59); Bangkok, Thailand
- Occupation: Politician

Patima Jeerapaet (Thai: ปฏิมา จีระแพทย์; RTGS: Patima Chiraphaet) is a Thai businessman and politician. Jeerapaet spent much of his early career in the real estate business, including as managing director of Colliers International Thailand. He served as president of Thailand Automotive Institute from 2012-2016. He has served as a ministerial advisor and advisor to a number of Thai government agencies.

Jeerapaet has also sat on numerous boards, including as the first Thai chairman of the Royal Institution of Chartered Surveyors Thailand and the chief executive officer of the Thai affiliate of AirAsia X. Jeerapaet has lectured at Ramkhamhaeng University and Assumption University for almost 20 years, establishing the latter's department of real estate management.

== Early life and education ==
Jeerapaet was born in Bangkok on 15 March 1967. He graduated from Saint Gabriel's College Catholic boys school and eearned a bachelor's degree in Business Administration (BBA) and an MBA from Assumption University.

In 2009, Jeerapaet was also awarded a Ph.D in Management and Organization Development from Assumption University. He has also attended numerous top executive programs.

== Career ==
Jeerapaet spent much of his early career in the real estate business, including managing director of C.I.T. Property Consultants Co., Ltd. or Colliers International Thailand until he became the president of Thailand Automotive Institute (TAI) in 2012.

As president of Thailand Automotive Institute, he looked to expand the industry's global reach and expand its testing centre. He also spearheaded the institute's five-year master plan for 2012–2016. He was also on the Working Committee on Initial Proposal Consideration of Eco Car 2 Project.

In 2012, he became an advisor to the Prime Minister Office and an advisor to the Senate Committee on Monetary, Finance, Banking and Financial Institutions (2012–2013), an advisor of International Trade and Investment, Thailand Trade Representative (2013), and advisor, Subcommittee Industry Reform, and the National Reform Council.

Jeerapaet has also sat on numerous boards. He was the first Thai Chairman of the Royal Institution of Chartered Surveyors (RICS) Thailand (2011) and since 2022 Chief Executive Officer of Thai AirAsia X Airlines, the Thai affiliate of AirAsia X.

Besides his role as businessmen, Jeerapaet has also lectured at Ramkhamhaeng University and Assumption University for 18 years. He also established the department of real estate management and the faculty of risk management and industrial services at Assumption University.

== Other accomplishments ==
With an interest in music, Jeerapaet served as executive producer of a song project to celebrate the 60th anniversary ascension to the throne of Thailand's King Bhumibol Adulyadej's. He was also the organizer of a charity car rally to award His Majesty's Cup, with proceeds from the rally going the Chaiyapat Association in 1999.
