= Gasinee Witoonchart =

- เกศินี วิฑูรชาติ

Rector of Thammasat University
- In office 30 October 2017 – 23 September 2024
- Preceded by: Somkit Lertpaithoon
- Succeeded by: Supasawad Chardchawarn

Personal details
- Education: Thammasat University (BBA); University of Texas at Austin (MBA)

Gasinee Witoonchart (Thai: เกศินี วิฑูรชาติ, RTGS: Kesini Withunchat) is a Thai academic administrator who served as rector of Thammasat University from 2017 to 2024.

== Career ==
Gasinee led the university's response to the COVID-19 pandemic in Thailand, establishing a 300-bed field hospital at its Rangsit campus in Pathum Thani. She oversaw the Rangsit campus' effort to generate energy from solar panels, and building the largest rooftop farm in Asia, the Thammasat Urban Farming Green Roof.
