= Angsana Techatassanasoontorn =

Professor of information systems in New Zealand

Academic background
- Education: University of Minnesota
- Thesis: The state-based and regional contagion theories of technology diffusion (2006)
- Doctoral advisor: Robert J. Kauffman

Angsana A. Techatassanasoontorn (Thai: อังสนา เตชะทัศนสุนทร (อัชชะกุลวิสุทธิ์), RTGS: Angsana Techathatsanasunthon (Atchakunwisit)) is a New Zealand academic, and is Professor of Information Systems at the Auckland University of Technology, specialising in the social effects of, and attitudes towards, digital transformations and emerging technologies.

== Academic career ==
Techatassanasoontorn completed a Bachelor of Science in statistics at Chulalongkorn University in Thailand, and a MSc degree in management information systems at Arizona State University. Techatassanasoontorn then worked as a lecturer at Thammasat University in Bangkok, before completing by PhD titled The State-based and Regional Contagion Theories of Technology Diffusion at the Carlson School of Management, University of Minnesota. Techatassanasoontorn then worked as an assistant professor at Pennsylvania State University before joining the faculty of the Auckland University of Technology in 2011, rising to associate professor in 2015 and full professor in 2023.

Techatassanasoontorn's research focus is the societal implications of emerging technologies. She is interested in accessibility and social inclusion, and the positive and negative effects of digital developments such as workplace automation. She was the co-director of the World Internet Project, through the Work Research Institute at AUT, which was the New Zealand version of a multi-year global examination of internet access trends, how people use the internet and their attitudes towards it.

Techatassanasoontorn has received research funding from the Association for Computing Machinery, Microsoft, the U.S. National Science Foundation, and Qualcomm. She is a senior editor on the board of the journal Information Systems Journal.

== Selected works ==
=== Popular articles ===
- Techatassanasoontorn, Angsana A.; Waizenegger, Lena (9 January 2023). "What if your colleague is a bot? Harnessing the benefits of workplace automation without alienating staff". The Conversation.
- Techatassanasoontorn, Angsana A.; Andrade, Antonio Diaz; Doolin, Bill; Singh, Harminder (18 July 2022). "The downside of digital transformation: why organisations must allow for those who can't or won't move online". The Conversation.
- Techatassanasoontorn, Angsana A.; Waizenegger, Lena (14 December 2021). "'Sorry, I don't understand that' – the trouble with chatbots and how to use them better". The Conversation.

=== Scholarly articles ===
- Hua Xin; Angsana A. Techatassanasoontorn; Tan, Felix (2015). "Antecedents of Consumer Trust in Mobile Payment Adoption". Journal of Computer Information Systems. 55 (4): 1–10. doi:10.1080/08874417.2015.11645781. Wikidata Q124214838.
- Robert J. Kauffman; Angsana A. Techatassanasoontorn (2005). "International Diffusion of Digital Mobile Technology: A Coupled-Hazard State-Based Approach" (PDF). Information Technology and Management. 6 (2–3): 253–292. doi:10.1007/s10799-005-5882-3. Wikidata Q124214914.
- Angsana Techatassanasoontorn; Robert Kauffman (2005). "Is There a Global Digital Divide for Digital Wireless Phone Technologies?". Journal of the Association for Information Systems. 6 (12): 338–382. doi:10.17705/1jais.00073. Wikidata Q124214923.
- S.W. Chou; A.A. Techatassanasoontorn; I.H. Hung (2015). "Understanding commitment in business process outsourcing relationships". Information & Management. 52 (1): 30–43. doi:10.1016/j.im.2014.10.003. Wikidata Q124214839.
- Antonio Díaz Andrade; Angsana A. Techatassanasoontorn (2020). "Digital enforcement: Rethinking the pursuit of a digitally‐enabled society". Information Systems Journal. 31 (1): 184–197. doi:10.1111/isj.12306. Wikidata Q117218365.
- Harminder Singh; Antonio Díaz Andrade; Angsana A. Techatassanasoontorn (2017). "The practice of ICT-enabled development". Information Technology for Development. 24 (1): 37–62. doi:10.1080/02681102.2017.1283284. Wikidata Q58527966.
- Thai Ha Nguyen; Waizenegger, Lena; Angsana A. Techatassanasoontorn (2021). ""Don't Neglect the User!" – Identifying Types of Human-Chatbot Interactions and their Associated Characteristics". Information Systems Frontiers. 24 (3): 797–838. doi:10.1007/s10796-021-10212-x. Wikidata Q123455588.
