= Yupa Hanboonsong =

Thai entomologist

Yupa Hanboonsong (Thai: ยุพา หาญบุญทรง, RTGS: Yupha Hanbunsong) is a Thai entomologist, specializing in entomophagy (the use of insects as food). Hanboonsong received her PhD in insect systematics from Lincoln University in New Zealand, and currently works as an associate professor in the entomology department at Khon Kaen University.

The effects on Thailand of the 1997 Asian financial crisis prompted Hanboonsong to train rice farmers in remote areas of the country to farm crickets as a cheap and plentiful nutrition source. She has co-authored reports on insect farming for the United Nations Food and Agriculture Organization (FAO), including Six-legged livestock: edible insect farming, collecting and marketing in Thailand (2013) and Edible insects in Lao PDR: building on tradition to enhance food security.
