= Ngamta Thamwattana =

Thai mathematician

Ngamta ""Natalie"" Thamwattana is a Thai mathematician who works in Australia as a Professor of Applied Mathematics at the University of Newcastle (Australia). In 2014 she won the J. H. Michell Medal of ANZIAM for her "pioneering contributions in the areas of granular materials and nanotechnology".

Thamwattana came from Chumphon Province in Thailand, where her mother made dresses and her father worked in the police. After her first year of university, her high test scores in science and mathematics earned her a government scholarship with full tuition and, later, support for doctoral studies abroad. She earned a bachelor's degree in mathematics from Mahidol University in Thailand in 2000, choosing mathematics because as a mathematician she wouldn't "have to play with the chemical stuff and we didn't have to kill rat or any insects". She completed her Ph.D. at Wollongong in 2004 under the supervision of James Murray Hill.

After completing her studies, she returned the money from her Thai scholarship in order to stay in Australia with her new husband, a lecturer at Wollongong. She joined the Wollongong faculty herself, and founded the Nanomechanics Group there. In 2018 she moved to University of Newcastle (Australia) to take up a position as professor of Applied Mathematics.
