= Sumkhan Poamsombat =

Thai footballer (born 1979)

Personal information
- Full name: Sumkhan Poamsombat
- Date of birth: December 6, 1979 (age 46)
- Place of birth: Bangkok, Thailand
- Height: 1.75 m (5 ft 9 in)
- Position: Defensive midfielder

Senior career*
Years	Team	Apps	(Gls)
2007–2008	Muangthong United		
2009–2010	Samut Songkhram		
- * Club domestic league appearances and goals as of 22 June 2008

Sumkhan Poamsombat is a Thai former footballer. He played for Thailand Premier League clubside Samut Songkhram FC.

== See also ==
- Football in Thailand
- List of football clubs in Thailand
