= Issara Sereewatthanawut =

Thai politician (born 1983)

Issara Sereewatthanawut MWM PCh SMT
- อิสระ เสรีวัฒนวุฒิ

Member of the 25th House of Representatives
- In office March 29, 2019 – March 20, 2023

Personal details
- Born: 12 October 1983 (age 42) Bangkok, Thailand
- Party: Democrat (2018-2023)
- Education: Bangkok Christian College; Suankularb Wittayalai School; Triam Udom Suksa School
- Alma mater: Chulalongkorn University; Ramkhamhaeng University; Imperial College London

Associate Professor Issara Sereewatthanawut, PhD (Thai: อิสระ เสรีวัฒนวุฒิ, RTGS: Itsara Seriwatthanawut; born October 12, 1983) is currently serving as Secretary-General of the King Prajadhipok's Institute (KPI) and Acting Director of the College of Politics and Governance of the KPI. Prior to these posts, Issara formerly served as Deputy Secretary-General of the KPI; and Former Member of Parliament (Party-List).

== Biography and career ==
The eldest son among the three children of the family that operates auto parts business through joint ventures with companies in Asia and Europe, Issara graduated from Bangkok Christian College, secondary school from Suankularb Wittayalai School and preparatory school from Triam Udom Suksa School. He holds a bachelor's degree (honours) in chemical engineering from the Faculty of Engineering, Chulalongkorn University, master's degree in public administration from Ramkhamhaeng University, and completed his Ph.D. degree in engineering from Imperial College London.

In 2024, Issara was awarded an Honorary Doctor of Laws from Mahachulalongkornrajavidyalaya University and an Honorary Doctor of Philosophy in Environmental Social Sciences and Sustainable Development from Rajamangala University of Technology Thanyaburi. On 12 February 2025, he received an Honorary Doctorate in Political Science from Ramkhamhaeng University, and on 25 March 2026, he was conferred an Honorary Doctor of Public Administration in Public Sector Management Innovation from Rajamangala University of Technology Rattanakosin. On 5 September 2026, he was conferred an Honorary Doctor of Education from Rambhai Barni Rajabhat University.

Prior to his career in politics and public service, Issara was a businessman and a lecturer at both public and private higher education institutions. His academic title is Associate Professor.

Politically, Issara is a former Chief of Staff and Chief Advisor to the President of the National Assembly, Chuan Leekpai. In early May 2022, he was appointed as head of Democrat Party's committee on modern economy (replacing Prinn Panitchpakdi who resigned over his alleged sexual misconduct).
