= Tom Dundee (Thai singer) =

Thai singer and actor (born c. 1959)

Tom Dundee ทอม ดันดี
- Born: Phanthiwa Phumiprathet (Thai: พันทิวา ภูมิประเทศ); 20 May 1958 (age 68); Phetchaburi, Thailand
- Genres: Phleng phuea chiwit
- Occupations: Singer-songwriter; producer
- Instrument: Vocal
- Years active: 1986–2012; 2020–present
- Labels: Waew Wan (1989−1990); D-Day Entertainment (1990–1993); Warner Music Thailand (1993-2012); Independence (2020–present)

Panthiwa Phumiprathet (Thai: พันทิวา ภูมิประเทศ; born 20 May 1958), known as Thanat Thanawacharanon (Thai: ธานัท ธนนนท์วัชร) or Tom Dundee (Thai: ทอม ดันดี), is a Thai phleng phuea chiwit singer and actor. He was popular in 1993 with his first studio album [If] like this I must kick with a knee (อย่างนี้ต้องตีเข่า).

== Early life and career ==
He was born in Phetchaburi province. He finished his education in France, where he became close friends with family of the former prime minister of Thailand, Pridi Banomyong. After he finished his education, he started on stage in 1983 as a member of ZuZu, a famous Thai Phleng phuea chiwit (Songs for Life) music band. He was a lead vocal of ZuZu with Raphin Bhuddhichart, and he have song which vocal for ZuZu include "Broken" (Yab Yearn, ยับเยิน), "The Chiang Mai Umbrella woman" (Bor Sang Klang Jong, บ่อสร้างกางจ้อง), "The Mayura" (มยุรา), etc. And he resigned from ZuZu after he joined to protest in 1992 Black May. After that, he started to solo singer with his first studio album, [If] like this I must kick with a knee (อย่างนี้ต้องตีเข่า).

== Political career ==
He supported the United Front for Democracy Against Dictatorship (commonly called the Red Shirts) and he appeared on the stage and had speeches on multiple occasions. He was jailed for Lèse-majesté in 2016, and was freed in 2020. after which he returned to entertainment.

== Discography ==
With ZuZu

- Roads to new Hope (สู่ความหวังใหม่, 1989)
- Where is the coral? (ปะการังไปไหน, 1990)
- The salt farmer (คนเค็มเลคาว, 1991)
- The King of Cha, cha, cha' (ราชาสามช่า, 1992; This song tribute to Aed Carabao)

As solo singer

- This is must kick you with knee (อย่างนี้ต้องตีเข่า, 1993)
- Refreshed (มันเขี้ยว, 1994)
- Tom Thai rhythm (ทอม..จังหวะไทย, 1995)
- The bravely medal (เหรียญกล้าหาญ, 1995)
