= Chan Yenkhae =

Thai singer

Chan Yenkhae ชาญ เย็นแข
- Born: September 10, 1926; Bangkok, Thailand
- Died: October 5, 1988 (aged 62)
- Occupation: Vocalist
- Instrument: Vocals

Chan Yenkhae (Thai: ชาญ เย็นแข, 10 September 1926 – 5 October 1988) was a Thai singer.

Chan Yenkhae born in Bangkok between Giant Swing. He graduated from Bawonnivet School. He is a singer from contest in Temple Festival since World War II by use of the codename "Aewphaya". After the end of World War II, He became a disciple of Sanga Arampre.

In 1949, Chan Yenkhae went to Record Room to view the record Klanamnom of Paiboon Butkhan. But Boonchuay Hirunsonthorn, the singer of this song, was absent. So, Sanga presented Chan Penkair for record replace Boonchuay. When Radio Station open Klanamnom song. Suddenly, this song and Chan Yenkhae were popular.

Chan Yenkhae married Supannee Singharacha. He has one daughter. He died of a blood on 5 October 1988 while he was singing at Wongchan Pairoj Restaurant at Pattaya, Chonburi Province.
