= Snea Thinsan =

Activist

- Born: June 18, 1965 (age 61); Chiang Rai, Thailand
- Other name: Dr. Piangdin Rakthai
- Education: Chiang Mai University; University of Sydney; Indiana University Bloomington (Ph.D.)
- Occupations: University lecturer Academic; Political Activist
- Known for: Pro-democracy, political and Human Rights Activist
- Notable work: Revolution Theory "Mod Daeng Lom Chang" / Founder of the People's University / Founder of the Thai Alliance for Human Rights
- Height: 1.75 m (5 ft 9 in)

Snea Thinsan or Piangdin Rakthai, was born on June 18, 1965, in Chiang Rai Province, Thailand. He is a pro-democracy, political and human rights activist in exile abroad.

== Education ==
- High school: Phayaopittayakom School
- Bachelor's degree: Faculty of Education, Chiang Mai University, Second Honors and Best-All-Round Students (1987)
- Master's degree: University of Sydney, Australia (1994)
- Doctor of Philosophy: literacy, culture and language education from Indiana University Bloomington (2009)

== Work ==
Thinsan has taught in Australia, the United Kingdom, Afghanistan, and the United States. He first worked at The Consortium: World Education, The Experiment in International Living, Save the Children, which was sponsored by the United States' Department of State preparing Indo-Chinese refugees for resettlement in the U.S., during 1987–1992 in Panatnikom, Chonburi Province, teaching and training teachers of the English language and American culture. After obtaining his M.Ed. from the University of Sydney in 1994, he accepted a position as a professor at Chiang Mai University and worked there during 1994 to 2000. While at Indiana University, he served as associate instructor in the School of Education and, during 2006–2009, as visiting faculty/ English language program manager for the USAID-funded Afghanistan Higher Education Project. He also accepted a position as assistant professor in the English Department at Ball State University until the end of 2010, when he sought political asylum in the United States. Moving to California in 2011, Thinsan became less involved in the academic work, serving briefly during April–August, 2013, as pedagogy and technology specialist, at University of California at Berkeley. Since 2012, Thinsan has been engaged in non-profit human rights and pro-democracy activities as a co-founder and president of the Thai People's Revolutionary University for Democracy (founded on February 18, 2012) and as co-founder and chair of the board of directors of the Thai Alliance for Human Rights (founded June 28, 2012).

== Political activities and human rights ==
Thinsan has actively been engaging in Thai politics and human rights activities as Dr. Piangdin Rakthai. He appeared in public for the first time as Dr. Piangdin Rakthai via the online radio called RedUDD in April 2011. In 2012, he co-founded the Thai People's Revolutionary University for Democracy (or People's University or มหาวิทยาลัยประชาชน) on February 18, 2012, and the Thai Alliance for Human Rights (TAHR), which was registered with the State of California on June 28, 2012.

Thinsan is notable for speaking in polite and constructive ways, this being rare in many Thai political discussions. Importantly, he has founded a peaceful revolution theory called Mod Daeng Lom Chang (Ants Toppling Elephant). He has encouraged Thai people to revolt peacefully against dictatorial military jura for true democracy.

Thinsan is well known as an anti-monarchy political activist and has been charged with Article 112, or the Lese Majesty Law. He has been in exile in the United States and has also been among revolutionists associated with the Organization of FreeThais for Human Rights and Democracy (OFHD) led by the former Minister of Interior Charupong Ruangsuwan.
