= Ddnard Napattalung =

Thai writer

DDnard Napattalung
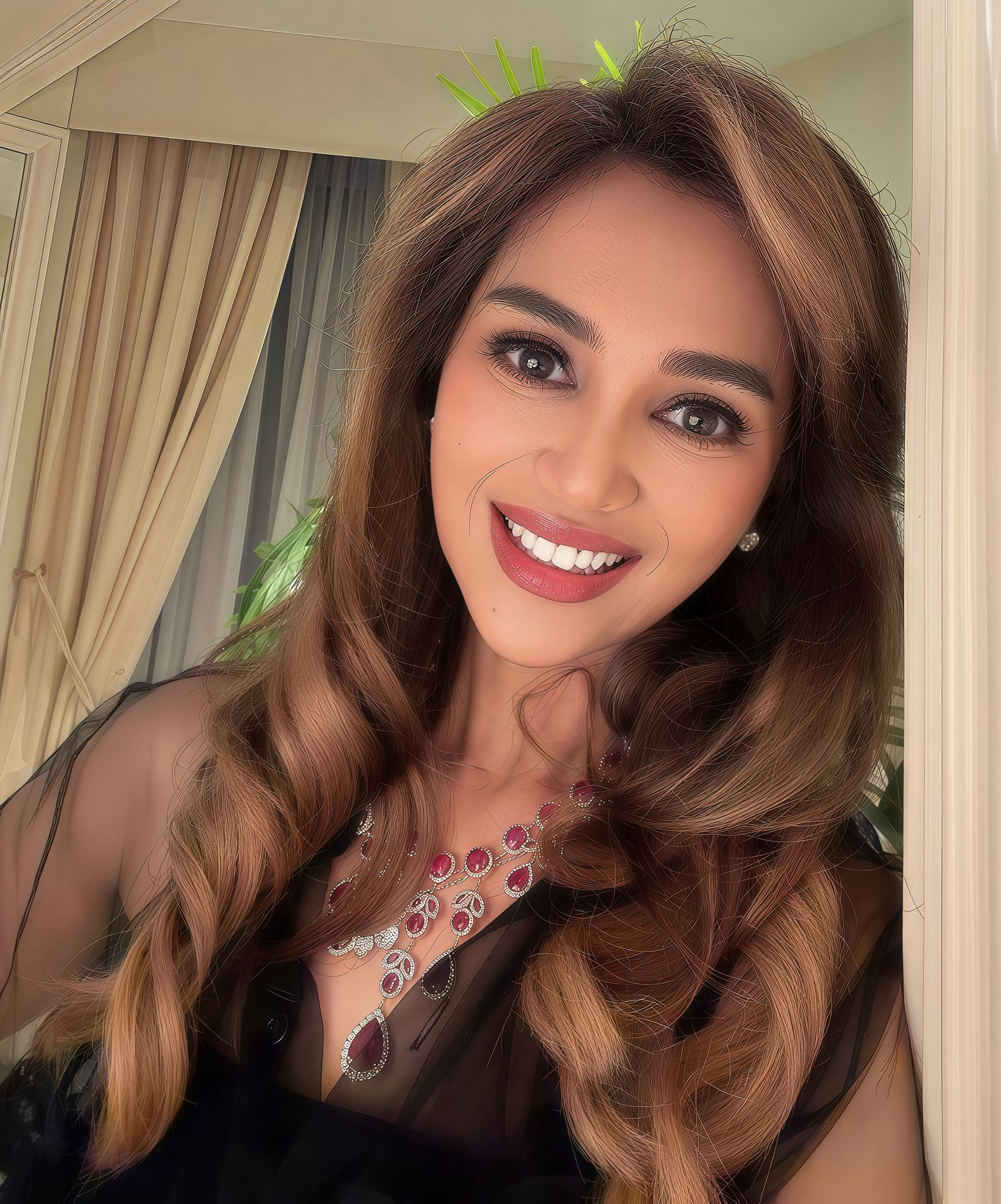
- DDnard in 2026
- Born: 1969 (age 56–57)
- Occupations: Entrepreneur, Investor, Philanthropist, Million-copy Best-selling Author, Neuroscientist
- Writing career
- Pen name: DDnard, Ddnard Napattalung
- Notable work: Life Compass series
- Website: drddnard.com

DDnard Napattalung (born 23 March 1969), is an entrepreneur, investor, and author, and philanthropist. She holds a Ph.D. in self-efficacy and is a neuroscience researcher specialising in brain, belief, and self-efficacy with 28 years in mental health. She is the founder of ESG Private Investments and the Zoul meditation and well-being app. Her best-selling book series, The Compass of Life, has sold over three million copies worldwide. For more than 28 years, she has supported hospitals, free schools, and hosted free meditation retreats. She is currently based in London and Dubai.

== Early life and education ==
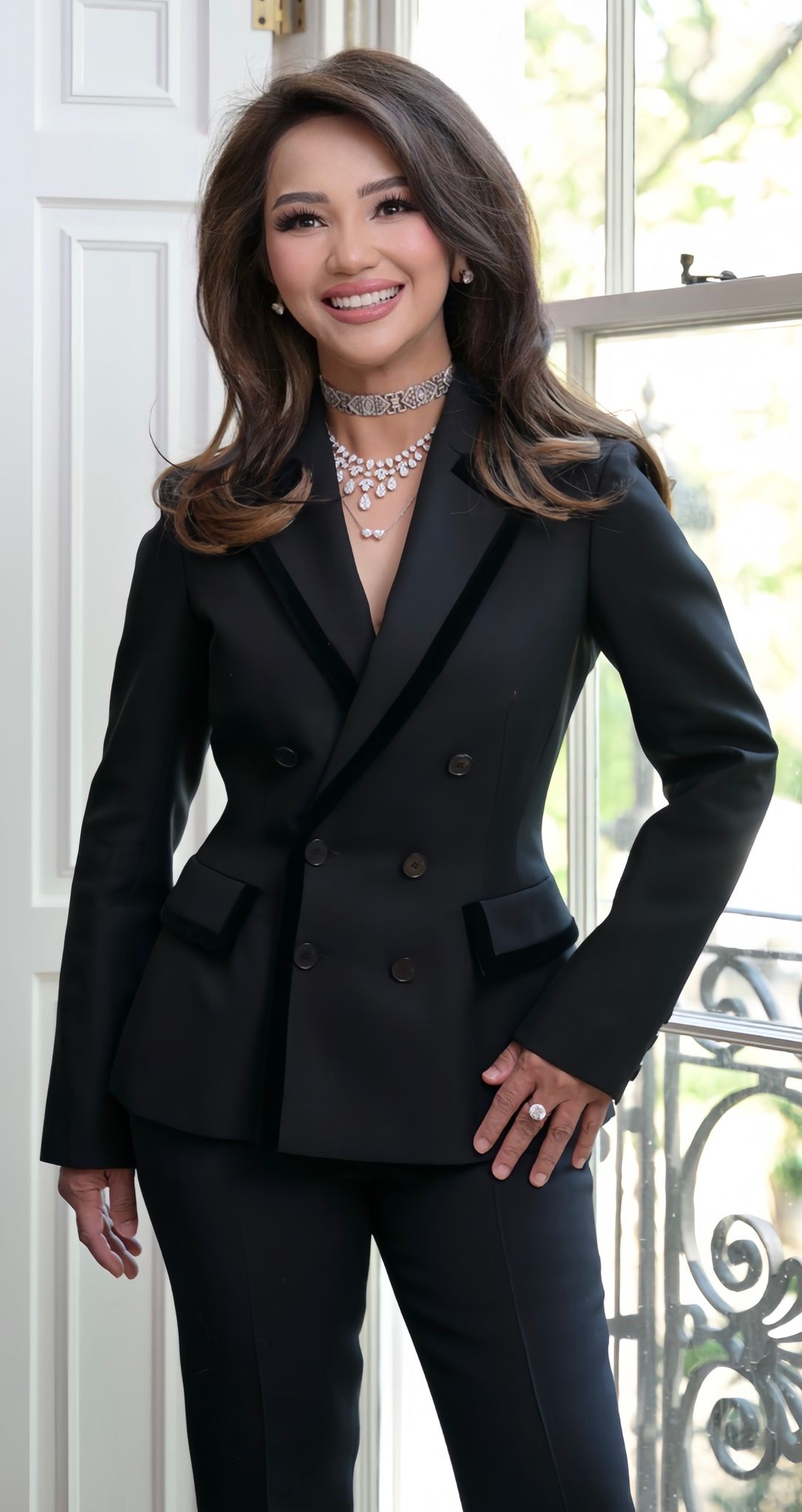
DDnard during her early career

DDnard graduated from the University of London at the age of 20 with two master's degrees in Economics and Private Equity, and a Ph.D. in Meditation on Self-Efficacy. Following graduation, she launched her own diamond retail business, opening nine stores in Thailand within one month, eventually expanding to 14 stores.

DDnard lost her husband when her son was eleven months old. She retired from the diamond business at the age of 35, and relocated from Bangkok to live a "peaceful life" with her son in Hua Hin and then Sriracha. She subsequently expanded into education firms and publishing before dedicating herself to meditation and spiritual practice. She spent time volunteering and teaching meditation and spiritual practices to various organisations, studied Happiness Sciences, Hypnotherapy, NLP, Behavioral Science, and began work on the first title in what would become the Life Compass book series.

== Life Compass book series ==
Her first book, The Life Compass, was published in Thailand in December 2004. Since then, several more titles in the series have been released. In 2013, the first English-language edition of The Compass of Now was released through The Life Compass Ltd. and has been released in an Indonesian edition by Gramedia Pustaka Utama. To date, DDnard's books have sold more than 3 million copies worldwide.

Her writings combine traditional Buddhist thought with modern mental techniques, offering perspectives on mindfulness, emotional clarity, and personal development. They explore ways to manage emotions, overcome challenges, and cultivate both emotional and financial well-being.

== Public speaking and philanthropy ==
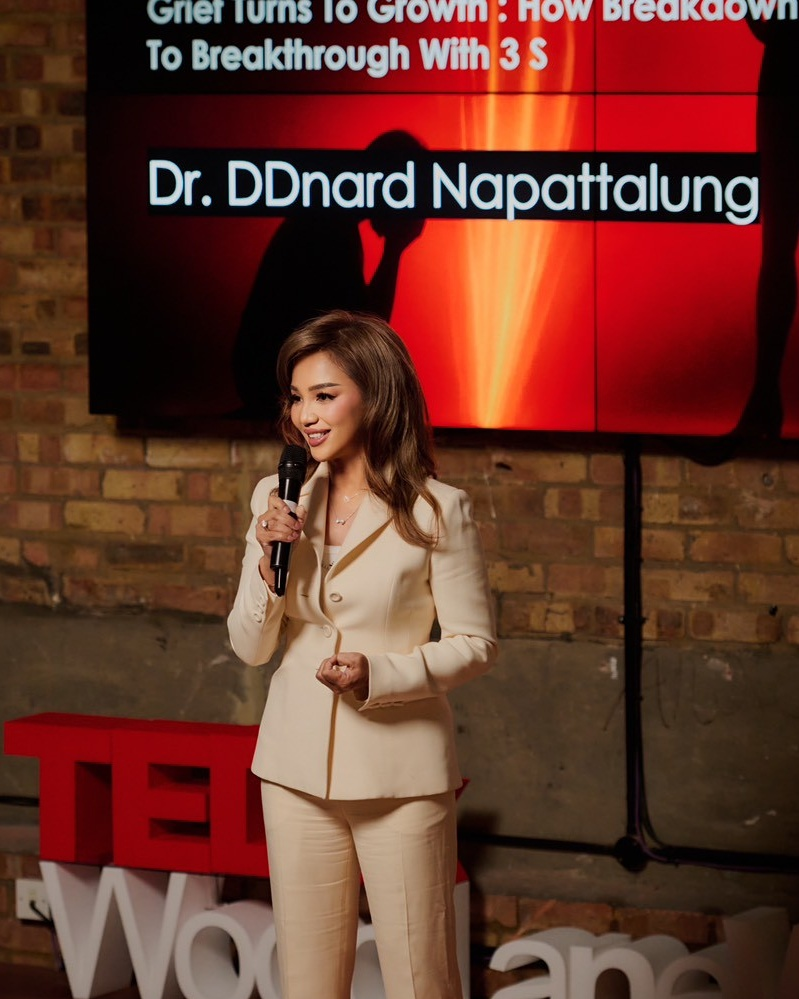
DDnard as a speaker at TEDx in London

Since 1996, DDnard has regularly led free meditation sessions for large audiences and supported various initiatives related to emotional well-being and mindfulness.

DDnard also gives speeches throughout Thailand, and talks at venues worldwide.

She has been featured as a TEDx speaker at TEDx Wood Lane Works in London, with her research focusing on brain, belief, and self-efficacy.

In June 2025, she was a speaker at the World Woman Cannes Agenda, held during the Cannes Lions Festival of Creativity week, where she addressed the topic of women, brands, and consumer behaviour.

== Zoul Mental Health & Sleep App ==
In 2025, DDnard founded Zoul, a mental health and sleep application.

Zoul completed its first internal funding round at a reported valuation of $222 million, raising $37 million and employing a global team of nearly 100 staff.

The application is available in 17 languages and provides free access to users in conflict-affected countries, including Syria, Palestine, and Ukraine.

== Philosophy ==
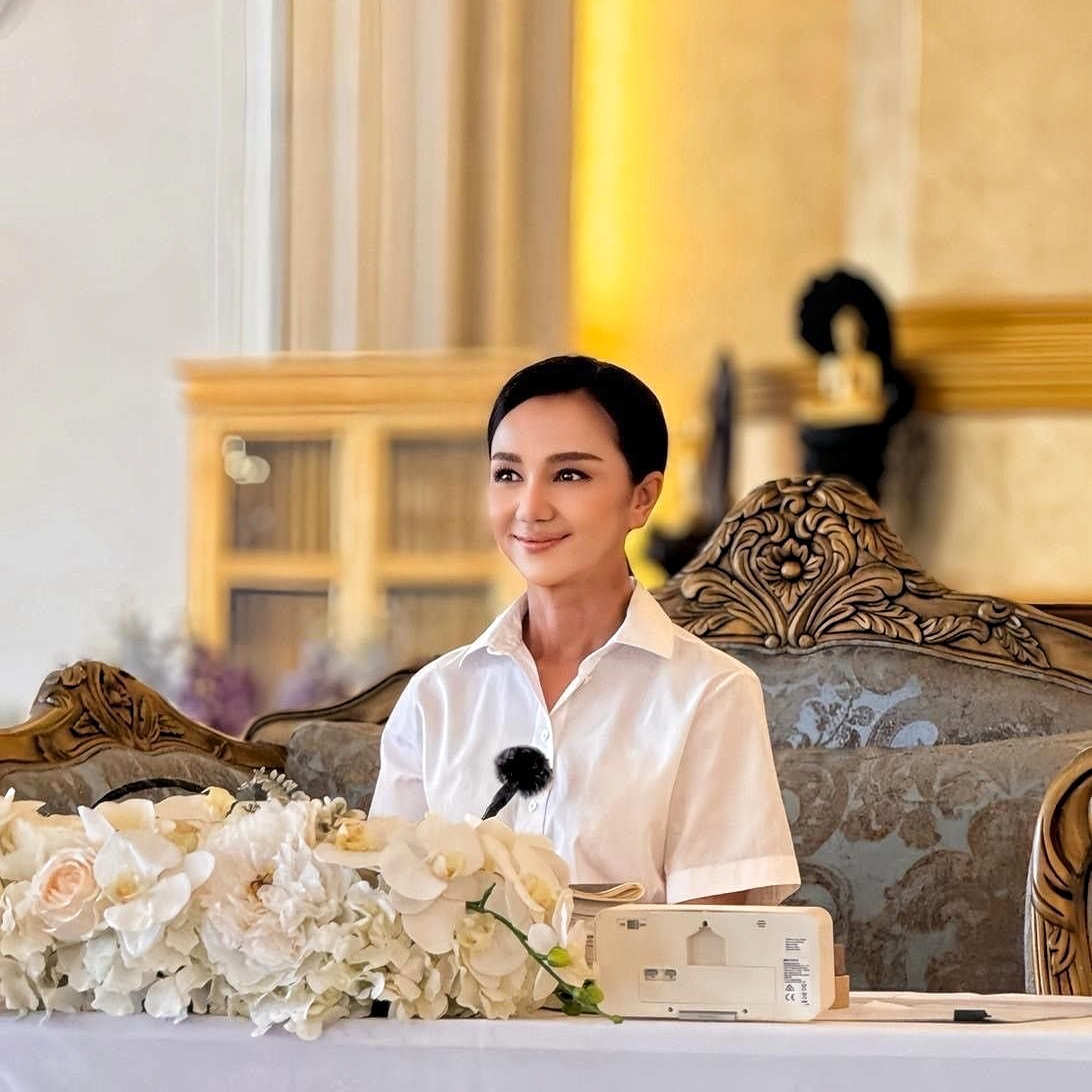
DDnard hosting a meditation session

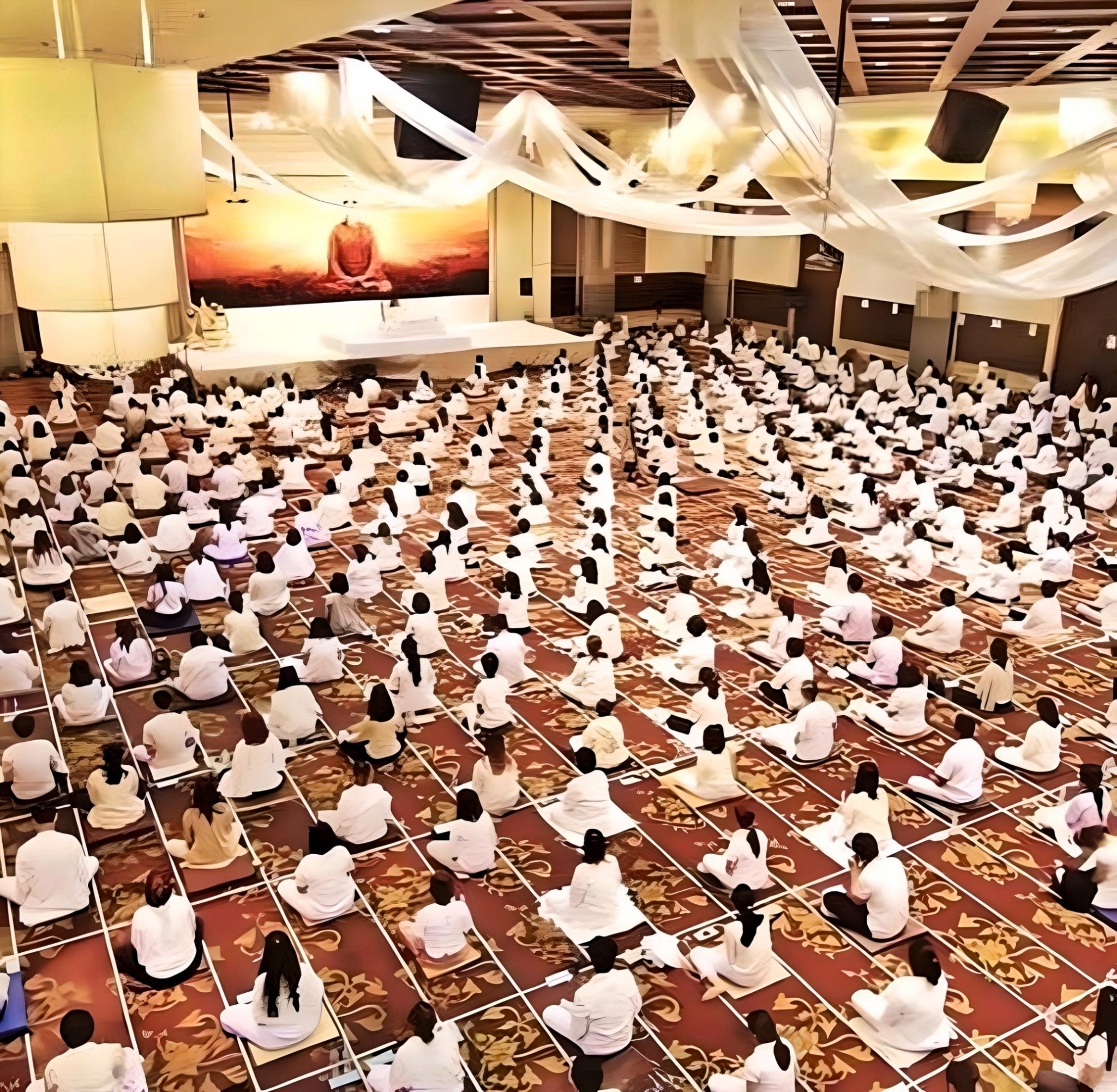
A large-scale meditation session led by DDnard

DDnard's work is grounded in her background in neuroscience and over 28 years in mental health. She believes that mental health is a form of economic infrastructure rather than a purely personal concern. In her view, the mental state of leaders and workers directly shapes the quality of decisions, productivity, and long-term organisational performance at both institutional and national levels. She also holds that mental strength is built through daily habits and structured practice, not through one-time events or interventions.

In 2026, a public discussion by DDnard on wealth, and economic environment reached between 200 and 300 million views.

== Recognition ==
In 2013, DDnard was selected as one of the '100 Greatest Thinkers of Thailand' by A Day Bulletin magazine, and her story was featured in the book 100 Interview The Thinker.

In April 2025, DDnard received the "Leader of the Year" award at the Women Changing the World Awards in London. She was also given an Honourable Mention for the Golden Heart Award, recognising her contributions to entrepreneurship, mindfulness education, and philanthropy.

== Publications ==
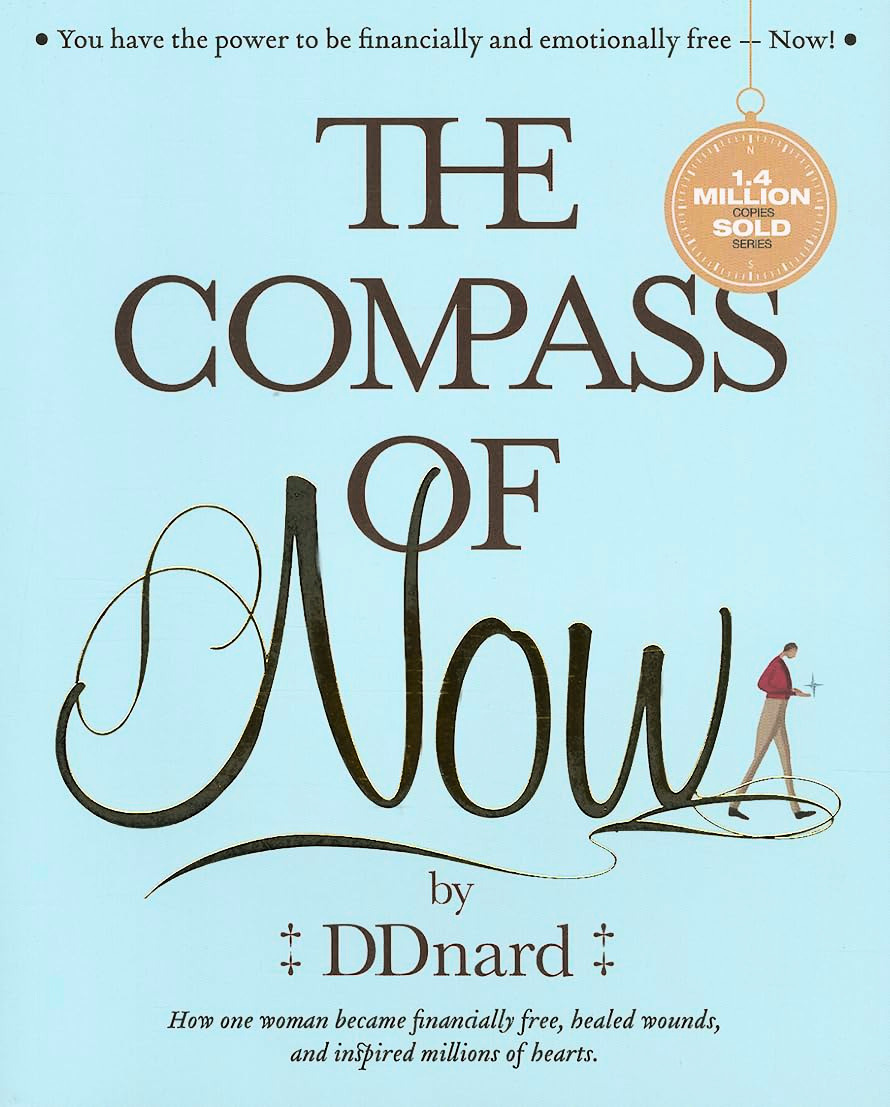
English edition (2013)

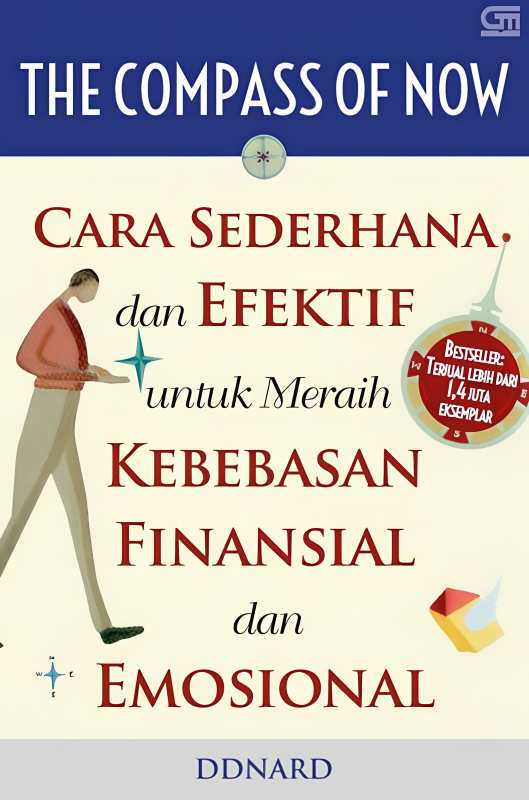
Indonesian edition (2016)

The Life Compass book series:

1. The Life Compass 1: Compass of Life (December 2004)
2. The Life Compass 2: Rules of Compass (December 2008)
3. The Life Compass 3: Rules of Happiness (December 2009)
4. The Life Compass 4: Compass NLP (July 2011)
5. The Life Compass 5: Compass of Wealth (October 2012)
6. 10th Anniversary Compass Series Box Set (March 2014)
7. The Compass of Now (English edition: March 2013; Indonesian edition: July 2016)
8. The Life Compass 6: Compass of Happiness (January 2014)
9. The Life Compass 7: Compass of Success (January 2014)
10. The Life Compass 8: Compass of Bliss (2014)
11. The Life Compass 9: Compass of Power (January 2016)
12. The Life Compass 10: The Billionaires of Buddha's Lifetime (December 2016)
