= Natcha Thawesaengskulthai =

Natcha Thawesaengskulthai (Thai: ณัฐชา ทวีแสงสกุลไทย, RTGS: Natcha Thawisaengsakunthai) is an academic, author, and technology and innovation management expert who has co-founded several education models in Thailand, including the Chulalongkorn University Innovation Hub, the Siam Innovation District, CU Enterprise, and the Chulalongkorn School of Integrated Innovation under Chulalongkorn University. She also chairs the ASEAN University Innovation and Enterprise.

== Board of directors ==
She serves on the Board of Directors of Thailand’s National Innovation Agency (NIA), Electricity Generating Authority of Thailand (EGAT), CU Enterprise, Council of Administrative Staff of Thailand, and is the Chairperson of CUE Foundation.

== Government and academic positions ==
An academic and author, she is currently Associate Professor and Global Chief Innovation Officer at Chulalongkorn University, and she sits on three Thailand’s Committee on transforming the higher education system in Thailand, Committee to establish regulations and policy to promote joint investment in order to utilize research and innovation, and in the Organizing Committee, Secretariat of COVID-19 Center. She previously served as Vice President for Innovation and New Developments at Chulalongkorn University, Vice Dean, Faculty of Engineering, and Acting Director, International School of Engineering, Chulalongkorn University.

== Chulalongkorn Innovation Hub ==
The CU Innovation Hub has numerous enterprises, including more than 298 innovation teams and startups with a total market valuation of US$ 500 million. The enterprise also developed Thailand’s COVID-19 vaccine with Baiya Phytopharm, another developer of a Thai COVID-19 vaccine and the COVID-19 strip Test. The Chulalongkorn School of Integrated Innovation is the first institute in Thailand to receive ISO 56002 certification.

== Books and Publications ==
Natcha Thawesaengskulthai has authored numerous books and reports. Her books include

- Accelerating Scale-Up Nation: Coach, Cash, Connect.
- Innovation Driven Enterprises Investment Ecosystem: Accelerating Thailand Scale-up Nation 2030.
- Thailand: Scale-up Nation 2030: Accelerating the Innovation Economy.

She has also published media articles. She holds two patents, one on Self claim service or Self-Claim on Cloud “Claim-Di,” and one on Chula Engineering Dog’s Legs.

== Awards ==
Dr Natcha Thawesaengsakulthai was the recipient of the Thailand Prime Minister’s “Evangelist of the Year” Award that were announced at the “Startup x Innovation Thailand Expo 2023 (SITE 2023).” She also received the Times Higher Education (THE) 2021 Outstanding Leadership and Management Team award for CU Enterprise.
