= Bundith Phunsombatlert =

International visual artist

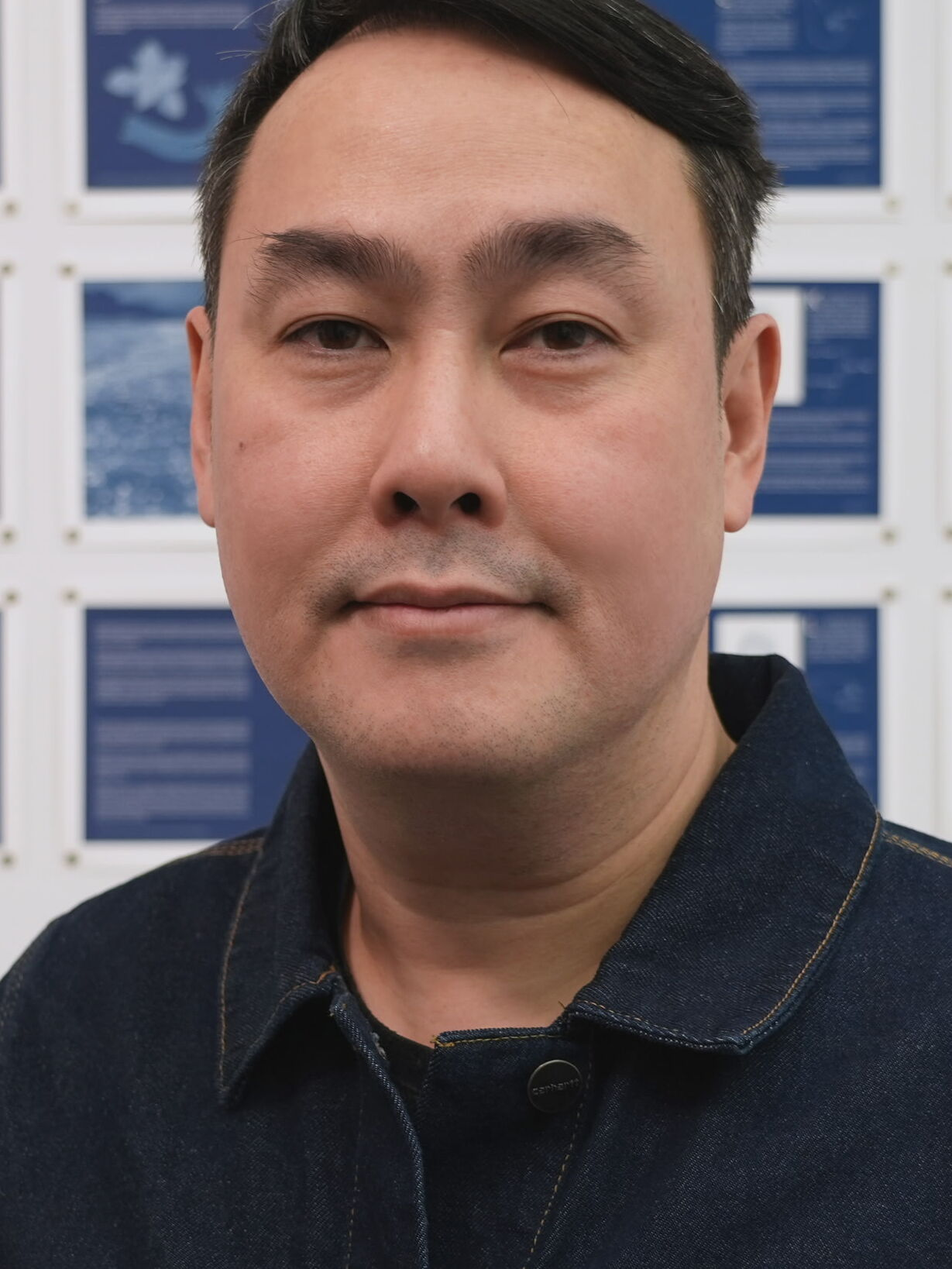
- Born: 1972 (age 53–54); Bangkok, Thailand
- Education: MFA (Digital+Media), Rhode Island School of Design; BFA/MFA (Printmaking), Silpakorn University, Thailand
- Known for: Traditional printmaking, sculpture, site-specific and interactive installations
- Website: bundithphunsombatlert.com

Bundith Phunsombatlert (Thai: บัณฑิต พูนสมบัติเลิศ, RTGS: Bandit Phunsombatloet; born 1972) is a visual artist from Bangkok, Thailand, based in Brooklyn, New York City.

== Early life and education ==
Bundith Phunsombatlert was born in Bangkok, Thailand, in 1972.

He pursued his studies at Silpakorn University in Bangkok, earning his BFA in 1997 and MFA in 2000, both in printmaking.

Later, between 2008 and 2010, he earned an MFA (Digital+Media) from Rhode Island School of Design, and did studies at the Department of Media Study PhD program, University at Buffalo, NY, from 2015 to 2018.

== Art practice and career ==
Phunsombatlert's range of works, from traditional printmaking to digital media, connect diverse populations, geographies, and historical periods.

In 1999 his project "Beyond the Future" was exhibited at the Third Asia Pacific Triennial of Contemporary Art at the Gallery of Modern Art in Brisbane, Australia. It comprised ready-made human products using silk-screened images on embossed plastic, re-investing printmaking with a social purpose.

After graduation he further developed his projects into multiple sculptural installations and new media: "Landscape: Transmitting Thoughts", held by the National Gallery in Bangkok, 2004 and "Path of Illusion", exhibited at the Museum of Contemporary Art Kiasma in Helsinki, Finland, 2004. In 2006 his work "On the Ball (The Game Has Begun. Beware Crossing the Grid)" was shown at the Bangkok University.

A grant from Asian Cultural Council in 2007 brought him to New York City for media art research, resulting in a Location One residency. and in 2011 an interactive installation, "Dwelling in Perennial Dreams."

In 2012 at Socrates Sculpture Park, NYC, and in 2015 at Flushing Meadows Corona Park, Queens, Phunsombatlert created signage and drawings of 100 existing NYC public sculptures, coordinating their locations via GPS. In 2013, in collaboration with New York City Department of Transportation, he created the project "Art within One Mile: The Route from Central Park to Brooklyn Bridge", signposting notable works of public art within the city.

Disruptions of various social contexts continue in his 2015 Cuchifritos + Project Space multimedia exhibition, “Memory, Market, and Migratory Transition,” offering again site specific themes.

In 2021 the Katonah Museum of Art in NYC presented an installation of 150 flags of different countries that were all printed in blue using his signature cyanotype process. He was named the 2023 Katowitz-Radin Artist-in-Residence at Brooklyn Public Library resulting in presentation of two interconnected projects revealing immigrant's personal histories otherwise omitted from grander narratives and through maps tracing their unseen paths.
