= Viphandh Roengpithya =

Thai academic

Viphandh Roengpithya (Thai: วิพรรธ์ เริงพิทยา, RTGS: Wiphan Roengphithaya; born 20 June 1938), also Vipandh Roengpithya, is a Thai academic. He is the founder and president of the Asian University of Thailand, located in Chonburi Province.

== Academic career ==
Roengpithya attended Assumption College, and went on to graduate from Chulalongkorn University at the young age of 19. Afterwards, he won a government scholarship to continue his studies in electrical engineering in London. After his graduation, in the late 1960s he moved to the United States, where he worked in the field of integrated circuit design. He returned to Thailand to care for his mother when she fell ill, and then chose to make his return permanent. He founded the Asian University in 1993. One of his goals as university president is to increase the number of international students studying in Thailand, with the aim of offering lower-cost English-medium education to students from poorer countries in the region.

== Other activities ==
Roengpithya is the chairman of the board of directors of Draco PCB, a public company listed on the Stock Exchange of Thailand. He formerly served as the chairman of the Asia-Pacific Economic Cooperation Business Advisory Council, from which position he retired upon reaching the age of 65. He relinquished his U.S. citizenship on 14 December 1994, according to U.S. State Department records.
