= Banchong Mahaisavariya =

- บรรจง มไหสวริยะ

President of Mahidol University
- In office 10 July 2020 – 9 July 2024
- Succeeded by: Piyamitr Sritara

Banchong Mahaisavariya (Thai: บรรจง มไหสวริยะ, RTGS: Banchong Mahaisawariya) is a Thai orthopedic surgeon who served as president of Mahidol University from 2020 to 2024.

== Career ==
Banchong served as dean of the Faculty of Graduate Study of Mahidol University from 2007 to 2014. He also serves as president of the Royal College of Orthopaedic Surgeon of Thailand (RCOST).
