= Dushdi Mala Medal =

Thai civil decoration

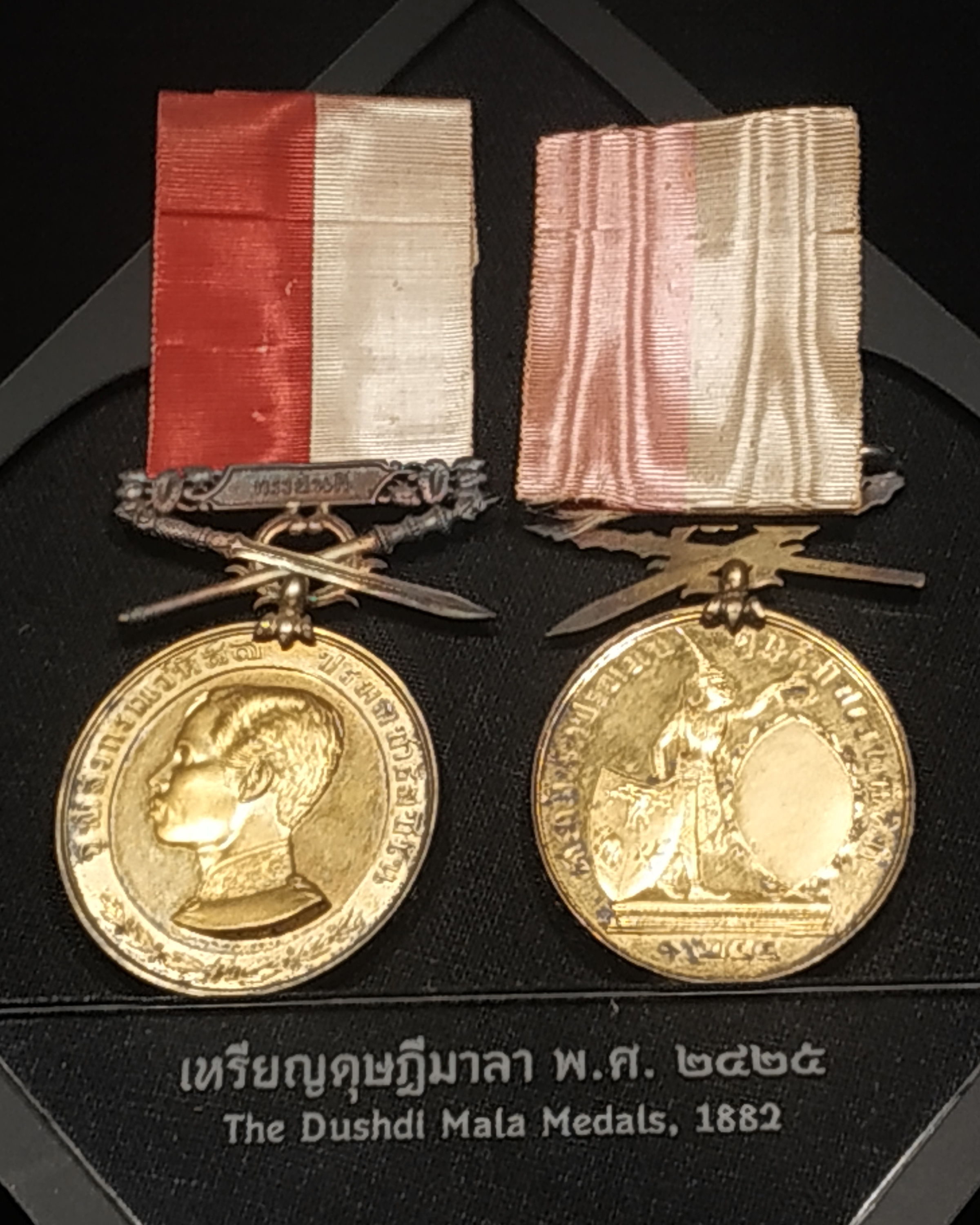
- Gold Dushdi Mala Medal (without medal bars), Coin Museum, Bangkok.
- Type: Medal
- Awarded for: Outstanding expertise in the arts and sciences
- Presented by: the Monarch of Thailand
- Status: Active
- Established: 1882

Precedence
- Next (higher): Santi Mala Medal
- Next (lower): Medal for Service Rendered in the Interior

The Dushdi Mala Medal (Thai: เหรียญดุษฎีมาลา, RTGS: Dutsadi Mala) is a civil decoration in the honours system of Thailand, and the highest-ranked medal among those granted for services to the state. The award was established by King Chulalongkorn (Rama V) in 1882 to celebrate the centennial of the Rattanakosin Kingdom. Originally given in five categories, each with an associated pin attached as a medal bar, today it is only awarded for distinguished services in the domains of the arts and sciences, which is denoted by the Pin of Arts and Science (Sinlapa Witthaya).

== History ==
Thailand's modern honours system was established by King Mongkut (Rama IV, r. 1851–1868) and formalized by King Chulalongkorn in 1869. In 1882, to celebrate the centennial of the Rattanakosin Kingdom, Chulalongkorn created the Order of the Royal House of Chakri and the Dushdi Mala Medal. While the royal order would be granted only to members of the Royal Family, the medal was to be awarded for merit, both to military personnel and civilians, regardless of social rank.

The medal was originally granted in five categories, each with a particular pin to be attached as a medal bar. They were:

- Ratchakan Nai Phra-ong (ราชการในพระองค์), for personal service to the king.
- Ratchakan Phaendin (ราชการแผ่นดิน), for service to the country.
- Sinlapa Witthaya (ศิลปวิทยา), for inventions benefiting the country, authorship advancing scientific knowledge, or expertise in a craft.
- Khwam Karuna (ความกรุณา), for charitable acts.
- Klahan (กล้าหาญ), for acts of bravery in the military.

When King Vajiravudh succeeded Chualongkorn in 1910, he created the Vajira Mala Order as his award for personal service, replacing the Dushdi Mala's use in that category. Other decorations likewise eventually rendered the three other categories of the Dushdi Mala redundant. In 1941 a new act of parliament was issued, repealing and replacing the original act. The new act modified the appearance of the medal, and removed the other categories of the award, leaving only the Sinlapa Witthaya pin to be granted to those exhibiting expertise in the arts and sciences.

By law, the Dushdi Mala Medal is granted at the discretion of the king, and this was followed in actual practice during its early years. As the academia advanced and the civil service grew, additional regulations were created to formalize the process. A 1928 regulation stipulated that the ministries would be responsible for the nomination of government officials under its command, subject to approval from the Royal Society. By 1978, this was again rewritten to allow non-government-employees to be nominated.

== Appearance ==
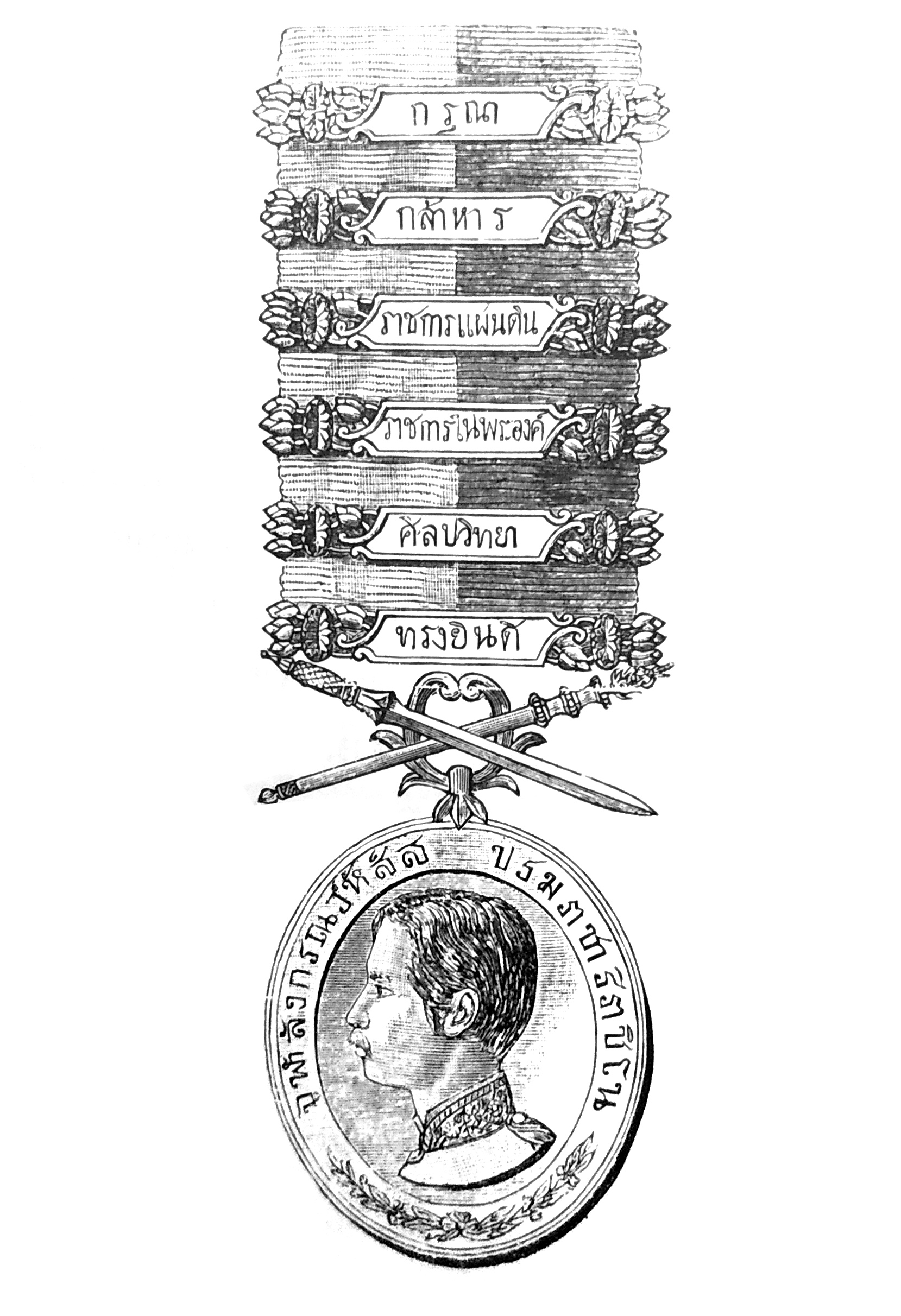
obverse

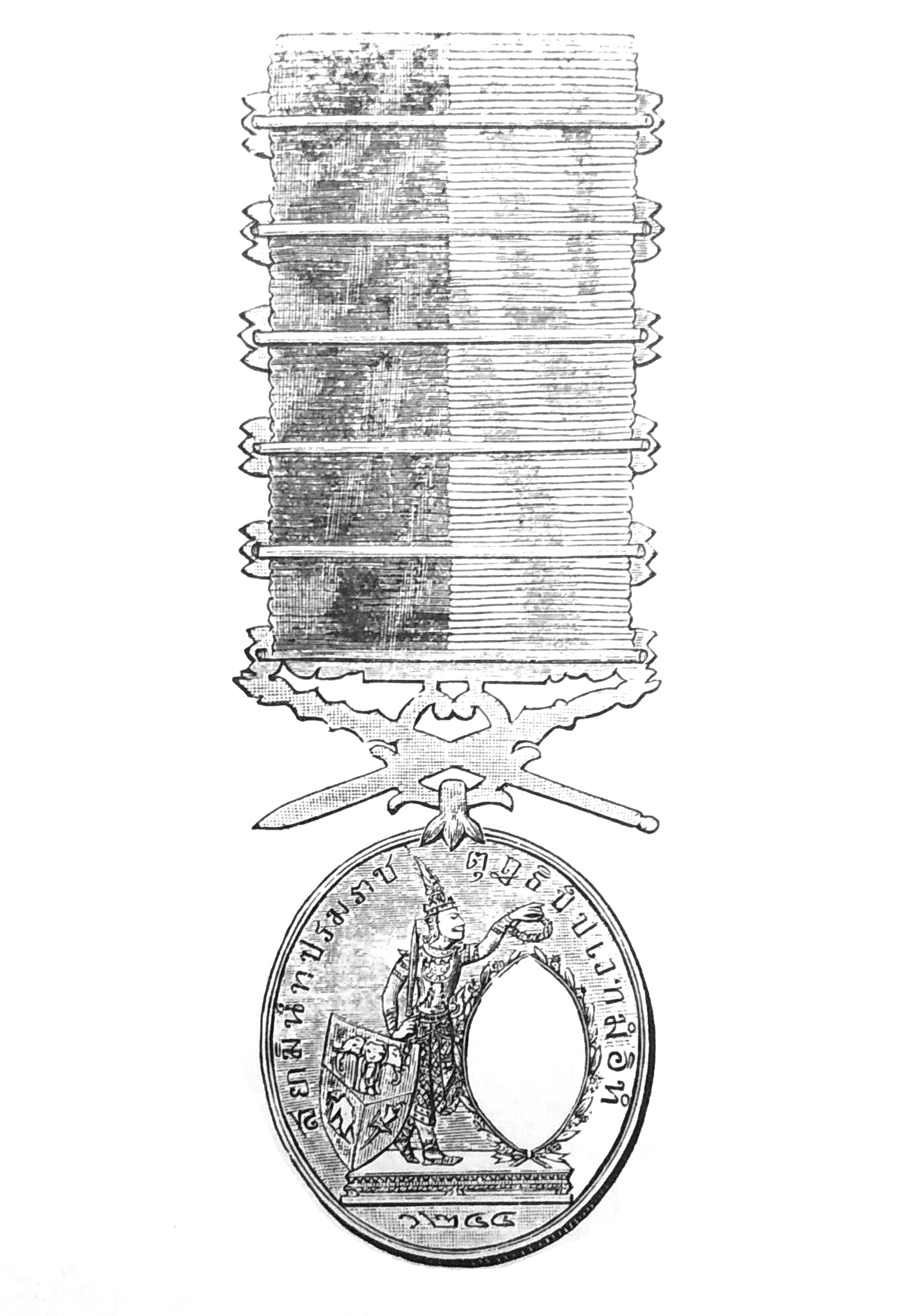
reverse

Appearance of Dushdi Mala Medal with all medal bars (1882-1941).

The Dushdi Mala Medal is oval-shaped. While the original medal could be made of any material, it is now made of gilded silver, according to the 1941 act. The obverse shows a portrait of King Chulalongkorn, with a laurel wreath below. On the reverse side is an image of Siam Devadhiraj, the guardian god of the country, standing on a platform, supporting the escutcheon (shield) of the coat of arms of Siam and holding a phuang malai (garland) above the name of the recipient. Below the platform is the number ๑๒๔๔ (1244), the Chulasakarat year of the medal's creation. The original medal also displayed the phrases "จุฬาลังกรณว๎หัส๎ส บรมราชาธิราชิโน" ("Cuḷālaṅkaraṇavhassa paramarājādhirājino", Pali for "Of the great king, whose name is Chulalongkorn") along the top border on the obverse and "สยามิน๎ทปรมราชตุฏธิป๎ปเวทนํอิทํ" ("Sayamindaparamarāja tuṭṭhippavedanaṃ idaṃ" - "This medal is a symbol of the pleasure of the great king, the King Siam") on the reverse, as well as "สัพเพสํ สํฆภูตานํ สามัคคีวุฏฒิสาธิกา" ("Sabbesaṃ saṅghabhūtānaṃ sāmaggī vuḍḍhi sādhikā" - "The unity of a people come together as a party shall be a guarantor of prosperity") engraved along the rim. Original medals are also signed "J.S. & A.B. WYON SC" in minute characters beneath the royal portrait.

The medal is attached to a suspension device in the shape of a crossed Sword of Victory and Royal Staff beneath a plate bearing the words "ทรงยินดี" ("with royal pleasure"). The ribbon is 3 centimetres (1.2 in) wide, red and white for military and police personnel, white and pink for civilians. The Sinlapa Witthaya pin is a bar with the words "ศิลปวิทยา" ("arts and sciences") and lotus motifs on both ends.

== Conferment ==
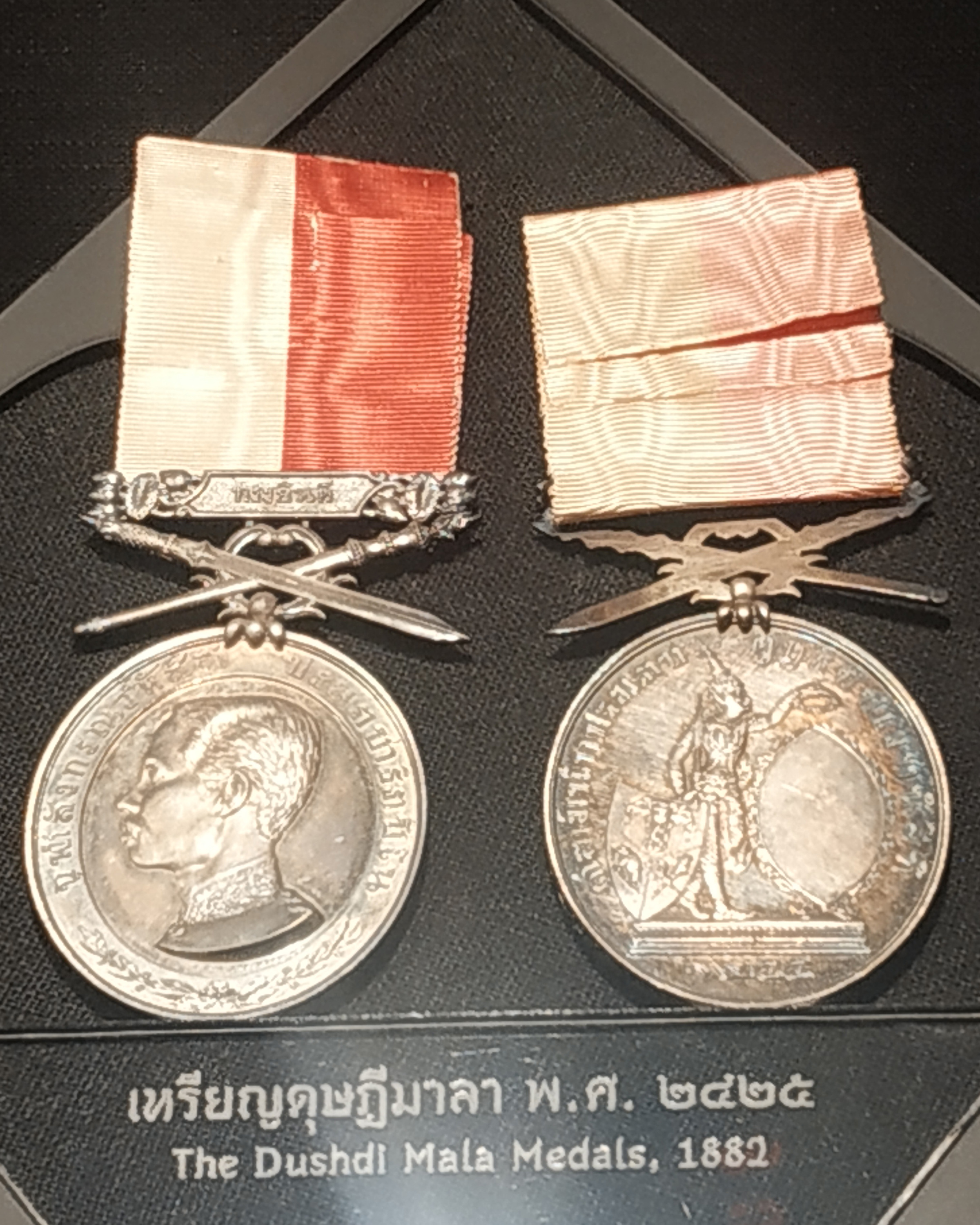
Silver Dushdi Mala Medal (without medal bars), Coin Museum, Bangkok. Note that the orientation of the ribbons is incorrectly reversed.

According to the 1978 regulation and its later amendments, nominees should have created or greatly improved upon knowledge, systems, processes or inventions, or demonstrated outstanding expertise and fame in the arts and sciences, with their work having exhibited great benefit to the country. Nominations may be put forward by the ministries, the Office of the National Research Council, the Royal Society, university councils, professional organizations, and previous awardees in the same field. The nominations are considered by a special committee, which will make a recommendation for the prime minister to forward to the Royal Household.

The medal is awarded by the King of Thailand, or by an appointee on behalf of the king. Conferred medals are property of the recipient and their heirs, but may be revoked in case of misconduct unbefitting of the award.

== Recipients ==
=== 1882–1941 ===
| Name | Medal | Pin | Awarded for | Year |
|---|---|---|---|---|
| Luang Wathitborathet | Silver | Sinlapa Witthaya | The trumpet | 1885 |
| Nai Pleng (Pleng Vebhara) | Silver | Sinlapa Witthaya | Completing barrister-at-law education from England | 1887 |
| M.R. Suwaphan Sanidvongs | Silver | Sinlapa Witthaya | Completing medical education in Europe | 1887 |
| Manu Amatyakul, son of Mot Krasapanakitkoson, royal page | Silver | Sinlapa Witthaya | Work with silver- and goldware | 1887 |
| M.R. Sanit | | Sinlapa Witthaya | Construction | 1889 |
| Prince Devawongse Varoprakar | Gilded | Sinlapa Witthaya | Arithmetic and calendars, etc. | 1891 |
| Prince Sapphasat Supphakit | Gilded | Sinlapa Witthaya | Construction | 1891 |
| Prince Damrong Rajanubhab | Gilded | Sinlapa Witthaya | Textbook writing | 1891 |
| Prince Narisara Nuwattiwong | Gilded | Sinlapa Witthaya | Painting | 1891 |
| Luang Lekhawichan | Silver | Sinlapa Witthaya | Painting | 1891 |
| Khun Chayasathitsakon (Thongdi Chitragani) | Silver | Sinlapa Witthaya | Photography | 1891 |
| Nai Thong | Silver | Sinlapa Witthaya | Painting | 1891 |
| Nai Chang | Silver | Sinlapa Witthaya | Painting | 1891 |
| Nai Yai | Silver | Sinlapa Witthaya | Painting | 1891 |
| Nai Waeo | Silver | Sinlapa Witthaya | Sculpture | 1891 |
| Nai Chen | Silver | Sinlapa Witthaya | Carving | 1891 |
| Nai Em | Silver | Sinlapa Witthaya | Goldsmithing | 1891 |
| Nai Khamkhao | Silver | Sinlapa Witthaya | | 1891 |
| Nai Thim | Silver | Sinlapa Witthaya | | 1891 |
| Nai Kan | Silver | Sinlapa Witthaya | | 1891 |
| Nai Lae | Silver | Sinlapa Witthaya | | 1891 |
| Khun Prasoetaksoranit (Phae Talalak) | | Sinlapa Witthaya | | 1892 |
| Khun Phromraksa (Kon Hongsakun) | | Sinlapa Witthaya | | 1893 |
| Inthawichayanon, King of Chiang Mai | Gilded | Ratchakan Phaendin | | 1893 |
| Phraya Ritthisongkhramramphakdi (Abdul Hamid Halim of Kedah) | Gilded | Ratchakan Phaendin | | 1893 |
| Chaophraya Rattanabodin | | Ratchakan Phaendin | | 1893 |
| Phraya Phetcharaphibannaruebet (That), Ruler of Nong Chik | | Ratchakan Phaendin | | 1894 |
| Prince Svasti Sobhana | Gilded silver | Ratchakan Phaendin | | 1895 |
| Prince Svasti Sobhana | Gilded silver | Sinlapa Witthaya | | 1895 |
| Phraya Wisutsuriyasak (M.R. Pia Malakul) | Silver | ? | | 1895 |
| Dr Bastian (Adolf Bastian?) | Silver | Sinlapa Witthaya | Writing | 1896 |
| Nai Chuen, royal page, son of Phraya Thipkosa | | Ratchakan Nai Phra-ong | | 1896 |
| Nai Chuen, royal page, son of Phraya Thipkosa | | Sinlapa Witthaya | | 1896 |
| Phraya Siharatdechochai (To) | | Ratchakan Nai Phra-ong | | 1897 |
| Phra Rattanakosa (Lek) | | Ratchakan Nai Phra-ong | | 1897 |
| Nai Kuat Humphrae (M.L. Wara) | | Ratchakan Nai Phra-ong | | 1897 |
| Nai Phinairatchakit Humphrae (On) | | Ratchakan Nai Phra-ong | | 1897 |
| Nai Suchinda Humphrae (Chom) | | Ratchakan Nai Phra-ong | | 1897 |
| Nai Phoem, royal page | | Ratchakan Nai Phra-ong | | 1897 |
| Phraya Wutthikanbodi (M.R. Khli Sudasna) | | Ratchakan Phaendin | | 1898 |
| Phraya Seninarongrit (Tunku Abdul Aziz), Raja Muda of Saiburi (Kedah) | | Ratchakan Phaendin | | 1898 |
| Luang Ramphaiphongboriphat (Chit), Railway Department | Silver | Sinlapa Witthaya | | 1898 |
| Luang Thoralekthurakari (Khem), head of the Telegraph Department | Silver | Sinlapa Witthaya | | 1898 |
| Luang Praisanithuranurak (Hem), head of the Postal Department | Silver | Sinlapa Witthaya | | 1898 |
| Nai Chuprian, Ministry of Public Instruction | Silver | Sinlapa Witthaya | | 1898 |
| Phraya Ratchawaranukun (Uam) | Silver | Ratchakan Phaendin | | 1898 |
| La-o Krairiksh, royal page, son of Phraya Phetcharat | Silver | Sinlapa Witthaya | | 1898 |
| Phraya Wichitphakdi (Kham), Governor of Chaiya | Silver | ? | | 1898 |
| Phraya Manunetibanhan (Chin), Ministry of Justice | Silver | Sinlapa Witthaya | | 1898 |
| Monsieur Recami(?) painter inspector, Paris | Silver | Sinlapa Witthaya | | 1899 |
| Luang Phaisansinlapasat (Sanan Devahastin na Ayudhya) | Silver | Sinlapa Witthaya | | 1899 |
| Nai Chamnankrabuan (Phan), Ministry of Interior | Silver | Ratchakan Phaendin | | 1899 |
| Chao Bunyawatwongmanit (Bunyawong), King of Lampang | | Ratchakan Phaendin | | 1900 |
| Khun Udomphakdi (Klan), Ministry of Defence | Silver | Ratchakan Phaendin | | 1900 |
| Tat Charurat, royal page, son of Luang Chamnibannakhom | Silver | Sinlapa Witthaya | | 1900 |
| Phraya Wichiankhiri, Governor-general of Songkhla | | Sinlapa Witthaya | | 1900 |
| W. G. Johnson, Department of Education | | Sinlapa Witthaya | | 1900 |
| Prince Abhakara Kiartiwongse | | Sinlapa Witthaya | | 1900 |
| Luang Prasitpatima | | Sinlapa Witthaya | | 1900 |
| Luang Pratiyatnawayut | | Sinlapa Witthaya | | 1900 |
| Mom Pharotracha (M.R. To Montrikul) | | Sinlapa Witthaya | | 1900 |
| Prince Maruphong Siriphat | | Ratchakan Nai Phra-ong | | 1900 |
| Khun Wichanchakkit (William Bunyakalin), Naval Department | | Sinlapa Witthaya | | 1900 |
| Mon Chatdetudom (M.R. Sathan Sanidvongs) | | Sinlapa Witthaya | | 1900 |
| Luang Sarasatphonkhan (G. E. Gerini) | | Sinlapa Witthaya | | 1900 |
| Khun Chayasathitsakon (Sa-at Chitragani) | | Sinlapa Witthaya | | 1900 |
| Phraya Wisetsongkhram (Sot Sapi), Ruler of Perlis(?) | | Ratchakan Phaendin | | 1900 |
| Prince Prani (Mahakul), son of Prince Mahitsawarinramet | | Sinlapa Witthaya | | 1901 |
| Dr H. Adamsen | | Sinlapa Witthaya | | 1901 |
| Phra Wasuthep (G. Schau), head of the provincial police department | | Ratchakan Phaendin | | 1901 |
| Chinaman San, carpenter, Naval Department | | Sinlapa Witthaya | | 1901 |
| Prince Boworadet, Army Department | | Sinlapa Witthaya | | 1901 |
| Luang Chitsorakan (Chit) | | Ratchakan Phaendin | | 1902 |
| Khun Ritsoraphloeng | | Sinlapa Witthaya | | 1902 |
| Phra Sithitnimankan (M.R. Chit Israsakdi) | | Sinlapa Witthaya | | 1902 |
| Phraya Anuchitchanchai (Sai Sinhaseni) | Silver | Ratchakan Phaendin | | 1903 |
| King Vajiravudh (as Crown Prince) | Gold | Sinlapa Witthaya | | 1903 |
| Prince Paribatra Sukhumbandhu | Gold | Sinlapa Witthaya | | 1903 |
| Prince Chakrabongse Bhuvanath | Gold | Sinlapa Witthaya | | 1903 |
| Prince Bhanurangsi Savangwongse | Gold (replacement) | Sinlapa Witthaya | | 1903 |
| Prince Prachak Sinlapakhom | Gilded | Sinlapa Witthaya | | 1903 |
| M.R. Suk, turner, son of Prince Chansuthep | | Sinlapa Witthaya | | 1903 |
| Nai Chan, painter | | Sinlapa Witthaya | | 1903 |
| Luang Lokathip (Chum), head of the rear astrologer's department | | Sinlapa Witthaya | | 1903 |
| Khun Luang Phra Kraisi (Thiam Bunnag), Ministry of Justice | Silver | Sinlapa Witthaya | | 1904 |
| Nai Chot, Ministry of Justice | Silver | Sinlapa Witthaya | | 1904 |
| Mr Carter | | Sinlapa Witthaya | | 1904 |
| Prince Nares Varariddhi | | Ratchakan Nai Phra-ong | | 1904 |
| Khun Saman Thatwisut (Plian Kanchanaran) | Silver | Sinlapa Witthaya | | 1905 |
| Mom Narentharacha (M.R. Sit Sudasna) | | Sinlapa Witthaya | | 1905 |
| Prince Purachatra Jayakara | Gold | Sinlapa Witthaya | | 1905 |
| Phraya Suriyanuwat (Koet Bunnag) | Silver | Sinlapa Witthaya | | 1905 |
| Phraya Suriyanuwat (Koet Bunnag) | Silver | Ratchakan Phaendin | | 1905 |
| Nai Li, carver | Silver | Sinlapa Witthaya | | 1905 |
| Chaophraya Surasakmontri (Choem Saeng-Xuto) | Silver | Ratchakan Nai Phra-ong | | 1906 |
| Chaophraya Surasakmontri (Choem Saeng-Xuto) | Silver | Ratchakan Phaendin | | 1906 |
| Chaophraya Surasakmontri (Choem Saeng-Xuto) | Silver | Klahan | | 1906 |
| Prince Yugala Dighambara | Gold | Sinlapa Witthaya | | 1906 |
| Prince Vudhijaya Chalermlabha | Gold | Sinlapa Witthaya | | 1906 |
| Phra Rathachanprachak (Mora) | Silver | Sinlapa Witthaya | | 1908 |
| Khun Sanoduriyang (Cham Sundaravadin) | Silver | Sinlapa Witthaya | | 1908 |
| Luang Chindapihrom (Riap) | | Sinlapa Witthaya | | 1908 |
| Prince Dilok Nabarath | Gold | Sinlapa Witthaya | | 1908 |
| Phra Ratchadetphakdi (Bua) | Silver | Sinlapa Witthaya | | 1909 |
| Prince Narathip Praphanphong | Gilded | Sinlapa Witthaya | | 1909 |
| Luang Phuwanatnarueban (Phad Devahastin na Ayudhya) | Silver | Sinlapa Witthaya | | 1910 |
| Luang Phruetthisanprasit (Amphon) | Silver | Sinlapa Witthaya | | 1910 |
| Prince Damrong (Pramoja), son of Prince Worachak Tharanuphap | Silver | Sinlapa Witthaya | | 1910 |
| Prince Anuchat Suksawat (Sukhasvasti), son of Prince Adison Udomdet | Silver | Sinlapa Witthaya | | 1910 |
| Nai Chan, enameler | Silver | Sinlapa Witthaya | | 1910 |
| Mr F.Grahlert, goldsmith | Silver | Sinlapa Witthaya | | 1910 |
| Prince Chalatlop Loesan (Kamalāsana), son of Prince Ratchasak Samoson | Silver | Sinlapa Witthaya | | 1910 |
| M.R. To Navavongs, son of Prince Thanom and grandson of Prince Mahesuan Siwawilat | Silver | Sinlapa Witthaya | | 1910 |
| Prince Chatchusak (Dvivongs), son of Prince Phutharet Thamrongsak | Silver | Sinlapa Witthaya | | 1910 |
| Luang Niphatkunlaphong (Chin Bunnag) | Silver | Sinlapa Witthaya | | 1910 |
| Luang Samitlekha (Plang Vibhatasilpin) | Silver | Sinlapa Witthaya | | 1910 |
| Mom Anurutthewa (M.R. Saiyut Sanidvongs) | Silver | Sinlapa Witthaya | | 1910 |
| Prince Thongchueathammachat (Thongthaem), son of Prince Sapphasat Supphakit | Silver | Sinlapa Witthaya | | 1910 |
| Luang Theprotchana (Sin Patimaprakara) | Silver | Sinlapa Witthaya | | 1911 |
| Luang Prasan Duriyasak (Plaek Prasansabda) | Silver | Sinlapa Witthaya | | 1911 |
| Phraya Samosonsapphakan (That Sirisambhandh) | Silver | Sinlapa Witthaya | | 1911 |
| Luang Rabamphasa (Thongbai Suvarnabharata) | Silver | Sinlapa Witthaya | | 1911 |
| Luang Nattakanurak (Thongdi Suvarnabharata) | Silver | Sinlapa Witthaya | | 1911 |
| Luang Phamnaknatnikon (Phoem Sugrivaka) | Silver | Sinlapa Witthaya | | 1911 |
| Prince Setsiri (Kritakara), son of Prince Nares Varariddhi | Silver | Sinlapa Witthaya | | 1911 |
| Prince Phanthuprawat (Kshemasanta), son of Prince Phromwaranurak | | Sinlapa Witthaya | | 1912 |
| Luang Aphibanphuwanat (Chamrat) | | Sinlapa Witthaya | | 1912 |
| Luang Phinitnitinai (Boonchuay Vanikkul) | | Sinlapa Witthaya | | 1912 |
| Luang Chintaphirom (Chit na Songkla) | | Sinlapa Witthaya | | 1912 |
| Nai Hatbamroe Humphraephiset (Sahat) | | Sinlapa Witthaya | | 1912 |
| Luang Thepphayon (Chamrat Yantraprakara) | | Sinlapa Witthaya | | 1912 |
| Luang Praditphichankan (Kon Hutasinha) | | Sinlapa Witthaya | | 1913 |
| Phra Aphirakratcharit (Son Saraketu) | Silver | Sinlapa Witthaya | | 1913 |
| Luang Aphibanburimsak (M.L. Thotsathit Israsena) | Silver | Sinlapa Witthaya | | 1913 |
| Luang Ratchadarunrak (Soen Panyarjun) | Silver | Sinlapa Witthaya | | 1913 |
| Luang Phlengphairo (Som), theatre department | Silver | Sinlapa Witthaya | | 1913 |
| Nai Bua, theatre department | Silver | Sinlapa Witthaya | | 1913 |
| Phra Thip Chaksusat (Nim), Ministry of Palace | Silver | Sinlapa Witthaya | | 1913 |
| Prince Thongthikhayu (Thongyai), son of Prince Prachak Sinlapakhom | Silver | Sinlapa Witthaya | | 1913 |
| Phraya Methathibodi (Sat Suddhasthira) | Silver | Sinlapa Witthaya | | 1913 |
| Phra Thip Chaksusat (Sun Sundaravej) | Silver | Sinlapa Witthaya | | 1913 |
| Phraya Boranratchathanin (Phon Tejagupta) | Silver | Sinlapa Witthaya | | 1914 |
| Phraya Burinawarat (Chuan Sinhaseni) | Silver | Sinlapa Witthaya | | 1914 |
| Phraya Narinthraphon (Plian Suvarnaprakara) | Silver | Sinlapa Witthaya | | 1914 |
| Louis Gilone(?), painter, sanitation department | Silver | Sinlapa Witthaya | | 1914 |
| Luang Saksanyawut (Suni Suwannaprathip) | Silver | Sinlapa Witthaya | | 1914 |
| Phra Phadungsakhonsat (Sansoen Sukhayanga) | | Sinlapa Witthaya | | 1914 |
| Luang Pradiyatnawayut (Sri Kamalanavin) | | Sinlapa Witthaya | | 1914 |
| Luang Hansamut (Bunmi Bandhumanavin) | | Sinlapa Witthaya | | 1914 |
| Luang Nithetkonlakit (In) | | Sinlapa Witthaya | | 1914 |
| Luang Chainawa (Thanom Sukragupta) | | Sinlapa Witthaya | | 1914 |
| Prince Sithiporn Kritakara, son of Prince Nares Varariddhi | | Sinlapa Witthaya | | 1914 |
| Luang Yotawut (Rattana Awut) | | Sinlapa Witthaya | | 1915 |
| Luang Awutsikhikon (Long Sinsuk) | | Sinlapa Witthaya | | 1915 |
| Luang Thayanphikhat (Thip Ketudat) | | Sinlapa Witthaya | | 1915 |
| E. Manfredi | | Sinlapa Witthaya | | 1915 |
| Aep Raktaprachita | | Sinlapa Witthaya | | 1915 |
| E. Healey | | Sinlapa Witthaya | | 1916 |
| L. R. de la Mahotiere, sanitation engineer | | Sinlapa Witthaya | | 1916 |
| Luang Chamnnanyotha (Daeng Chulasen) | | Sinlapa Witthaya | | 1916 |
| Phraya Butsayarotbodi (Thapthim Amatyakul) | | Sinlapa Witthaya | | 1916 |
| Luang Prachanakonkit (Pleng Jotimaya) | | Sinlapa Witthaya | | 1916 |
| Luang Nawiworasa (Yuen Navisthira) | | Sinlapa Witthaya | | 1916 |
| Khun Dontribanleng (Un Turyajivin) | | Sinlapa Witthaya | | 1916 |
| Carlo Rigoli | | Sinlapa Witthaya | | 1916 |
| Luang Sakdaphonlarak (Chuen Buddhibaedya) | | Sinlapa Witthaya | | 1916 |
| Prince Kawiphotsupricha | | Sinlapa Witthaya | | 1917 |
| Phraya Photchanasunthon (Rueang Atipremananda) | | Sinlapa Witthaya | | 1917 |
| Luang Chenchinakson | | Sinlapa Witthaya | | 1917 |
| Prince Dhani Nivat (Sonakul), son of Prince Phitthayalap Phruetthithada | | Sinlapa Witthaya | | 1917 |
| Phraya Nonthisensurenphakdi (Maek Syenasevi) | | Sinlapa Witthaya | | 1917 |
| Phra Sunthonlikhit (Tom Bunnag) | | Sinlapa Witthaya | | 1917 |
| Prince Khechorn Charasriddhi (Kritakara), son of Prince Nares Varariddhi | | Sinlapa Witthaya | | 1917 |
| Luang Si Bancha (Thuan Dharmajiva) | | Sinlapa Witthaya | | 1917 |
| Luang Saritkanbanchong (Saman Panyarjun) | | Sinlapa Witthaya | | 1917 |
| Luang Prakatkonlasin (Phin Puranayukti) | | Sinlapa Witthaya | | 1917 |
| Luang Yutthakanbancha (Chuea Udomsin) | | Sinlapa Witthaya | | 1917 |
| Prince Vudhijaya Chalermlabha | (Previously awarded) | Ratchakan Phaendin | | 1917 |
| Phra Prachanakonkit (Chum Yantrakovida) | | Sinlapa Witthaya | | 1917 |
| Luang Aphibanburimsak (Phian Taitilanon) | | Sinlapa Witthaya | | 1917 |
| Phraya Prasitsupphakan (M.L. Fuea Phungbun) | | Sinlapa Witthaya | | 1918 |
| Luang Chopkrabuanyut (Chit Yuvanatemiya) | | Ratchakan Phaendin | | 1918 |
| A. Marcan, Royal Treasury Ministry | | Sinlapa Witthaya | | 1918 |
| Niam Vajrasthira | | Sinlapa Witthaya | | 1918 |
| Alphonse Poix, royal physician | | Sinlapa Witthaya | | 1918 |
| Phra Borombatbamrung (Phin Srivardhana) | | Sinlapa Witthaya | | 1918 |
| Damri Amatyakul | | Sinlapa Witthaya | | 1918 |
| Luang Songwichai (Charoen Chanchai) | | Sinlapa Witthaya | | 1918 |
| Prince Iddhidebsarn (Kritakara), son of Prince Nares Varariddhi | | Sinlapa Witthaya | | 1918 |
| Prince Wibunsawatwong, son of Prince Sommot Amonphan | | Sinlapa Witthaya | | 1918 |
| Phra Praditphairo (Ewan Warasiri) | | Sinlapa Witthaya | | 1918 |
| Phra Manwaratsewi (Plot na Songkla) | | Sinlapa Witthaya | | 1918 |
| Luang Atthakanlayanawak (Wan Chamaraman) | | Sinlapa Witthaya | | 1919 |
| Khun Prasoethatthakit (Sai Limpiransi) | | Sinlapa Witthaya | | 1919 |
| Phraya Photchanapricha (M.R. Samroeng Israsakdi) | | Sinlapa Witthaya | | 1919 |
| Luang Kamchonchaturong (At Indrayodhin) | | Sinlapa Witthaya | | 1919 |
| Siri Indrabala | | Sinlapa Witthaya | | 1919 |
| Chaophraya Bodindechanuchit (M.R. Arun Chatrakul) | | Ratchakan Phaendin | | 1919 |
| Chaiphraya Aphairachamahayuttithamthon (M.R. Lop Sudasna) | | Ratchakan Phaendin | | 1919 |
| Chaophraya Thammathikonnathibodi (M.R. Pum Malakul) | | Ratchakan Phaendin | | 1919 |
| Chaophraya Wongsanupraphat (M.R. Sathan Sanidvongs) | | Ratchakan Phaendin | | 1919 |
| Luang Inthapanya (Wong Latphli) | | Sinlapa Witthaya | | 1919 |
| Luang Nimitlekha (Chai Thiamsinchai) | | Sinlapa Witthaya | | 1920 |
| Alfonso Tonarelli, Fine Arts Department | | Sinlapa Witthaya | | 1920 |
| Luang Konlakanchenchit (Phao Vasuvat) | | Sinlapa Witthaya | | 1921 |
| Prince Sukprarop (Kamalāsana), son of Prince Ratchasak Samoson | | Sinlapa Witthaya | | 1921 |
| Luang Sathianthapanakit (Duang Bunnag) | | Sinlapa Witthaya | | 1921 |
| Yon Yaiprayun | | Sinlapa Witthaya | | 1921 |
| Wongchan Vimuktananda | | Sinlapa Witthaya | | 1921 |
| Prince Paribatra Sukhumbandhu | (Previously awarded) | Ratchakan Phaendin | | 1921 |
| Luang Narongsongkhram (Thep Bandhumasena) | | Sinlapa Witthaya | | 1921 |
| Chom Ubon Ramakomut | | Sinlapa Witthaya | | 1921 |
| George Coedes, Ministry of Education | | Sinlapa Witthaya | | 1921 |
| Prince Wan Waithayakon, son of Prince Narathip Praphanphong | | Sinlapa Witthaya | | 1921 |
| Phra Anukromchittrayon (Phum Sucharitraka) | | Sinlapa Witthaya | | 1921 |
| Khun Thepphalaklekha (Sa Hutabara) | | Sinlapa Witthaya | | 1922 |
| Prince Ninpraphat (Kshemasrī), son of Prince Thiwakon Wongprawat | | Sinlapa Witthaya | | 1922 |
| Cecil Thomas | | Sinlapa Witthaya | Creating a sculpture of the king | 1922 |
| Luang Phrombancha (Phrom Suwannasathian) | | Sinlapa Witthaya | | 1922 |
| Luang Siphonphitthayaphon (M.L. Urai Israsena) | | Sinlapa Witthaya | | 1922 |
| Luang Yongyiangkhru (Chio Ramanatta) | | Sinlapa Witthaya | | 1923 |
| Khun Songnatchawithi (Run Arunanat) | | Sinlapa Witthaya | | 1923 |
| Luang Suwannakitchamnan (Wet Silpikula) | | Sinlapa Witthaya | | 1923 |
| Luang Chamnikonlakan (Cha Phothithap) | | Sinlapa Witthaya | | 1923 |
| Phra Prichachonlachon (Wan Charubha) | | Sinlapa Witthaya | | 1923 |
| Phra Ritthikhamron (Thiap Nairuea) | | Sinlapa Witthaya | | 1923 |
| Luang Chalamphisaiseni (Chalaem Sthirasilpin) | | Sinlapa Witthaya | | 1923 |
| Luang Maensorachak (Maen Pritikhanishtha) | | Sinlapa Witthaya | | 1923 |
| Luang Sitthidetsamutkhan (Sai Nabasthira) | | Sinlapa Witthaya | | 1923 |
| Luang Chakkranukonkit (Wong Sucharitakul) | | Sinlapa Witthaya | | 1923 |
| Luang Konlaphitpraphin (Phat Phatinavin) | | Sinlapa Witthaya | | 1923 |
| Luang Sakhonyutthawichai (Sakhon Siddhisiri) | | Sinlapa Witthaya | | 1923 |
| Luang Chianchensamut (Chian Putrananda) | | Sinlapa Witthaya | | 1923 |
| Luang Manukanwimonsat (Chom Chamaraman) | | Sinlapa Witthaya | | 1923 |
| Prasop Tiranandana, son of Luang Wichitchiaranai (Thongsuk Tiranandana) | | Sinlapa Witthaya | | 1924 |
| Sawat Nilanidhi | | ? | | 1924 |
| Phraya Anusatphaniyakan (Chalaem Guptaraksha) | | Sinlapa Witthaya | | 1924 |
| Luang Sarotrattananimman (Sarot Sukhayang) | | Sinlapa Witthaya | | 1924 |
| Phra Prasatthatkan (Kimbi Pranit) | | Sinlapa Witthaya | | 1926 |
| Luang Sutthiatthanaruemon (Sut Lekhyananda) | | Sinlapa Witthaya | | 1926 |
| Phra Chenduriyang (Peter Feit Vadyakara) | | Sinlapa Witthaya | | 1927 |
| King Prajadhipok | | Sinlapa Witthaya | | 1927 |
| King Prajadhipok | | Ratchakan Phaendin | | 1927 |
| Prince Alongkot | | Sinlapa Witthaya | | 1927 |
| Phraya Ramronnarong (M.L. Chuai Chatrakul) | | Sinlapa Witthaya | | 1927 |
| Phra Loha-awut (Chu Vajrasthira) | | Sinlapa Witthaya | | 1927 |
| Prince Trithiphetphong | | Sinlapa Witthaya | | 1927 |
| Phra Sisitthisongkhram (Din Tharap) | | Sinlapa Witthaya | | 1927 |
| Luang Wetchayanrangsarit (Muni Mahasantana) | | Sinlapa Witthaya | | 1927 |
| Prince Nakkhatra Mangala | | Sinlapa Witthaya | | 1927 |
| Mom Snidvongseni (M.R. Tan Sanidvongs) | | Sinlapa Witthaya | | 1927 |
| Luang Wiphatphumprathet (Ha Hutanukrom) | | Sinlapa Witthaya | | 1927 |
| Luang Phasuthawiphak (Sot Chenphumisat) | | Sinlapa Witthaya | | 1927 |
| Luang Boriphanyutthakit (Phao Phianloet) | | Sinlapa Witthaya | | 1927 |
| Luang Phisansanyakon (M.L. Angkap Sanidvongs) | | Sinlapa Witthaya | | 1927 |
| Luang Athonthurawut (M.L. Aphirum Xumsai) | | Sinlapa Witthaya | | 1927 |
| Luang Neramitphaichayon (Siang Susilawon) | | Sinlapa Witthaya | | 1927 |
| Phraya Uppakitsinlapasan (Nim Kanchanajiva) | | Sinlapa Witthaya | | 1928 |
| Luang Amnuaisongkhram (Thom Keshakomala) | | Klahan | Death in the line of duty fighting the Boworadet rebellion (posthumous) | 1933 |
| Khun Sukaranakseni (Chuea Sukranaga) | | Klahan | Death in the line of duty fighting the Boworadet rebellion (posthumous) | 1933 |
| Nuam Thongchanya | | Klahan | Death in the line of duty fighting the Boworadet rebellion (posthumous) | 1933 |
| Lamai Kaeonimit | | Klahan | Death in the line of duty fighting the Boworadet rebellion (posthumous) | 1933 |
| Sombun Buachom | | Klahan | Death in the line of duty fighting the Boworadet rebellion (posthumous) | 1933 |
| Lo Wongphram | | Klahan | Death in the line of duty fighting the Boworadet rebellion (posthumous) | 1933 |
| Chalaem Saksiri | | Klahan | Death in the line of duty fighting the Boworadet rebellion (posthumous) | 1933 |
| Chua Phueakthungyai | | Klahan | Death in the line of duty fighting the Boworadet rebellion (posthumous) | 1933 |
| Thong-in Phueakphasuk | | Klahan | Death in the line of duty fighting the Boworadet rebellion (posthumous) | 1933 |
| Chao Suksuai | | Klahan | Death in the line of duty fighting the Boworadet rebellion (posthumous) | 1933 |
| Phan Yangsawang | | Klahan | Death in the line of duty fighting the Boworadet rebellion (posthumous) | 1933 |
| Chan Suknet | | Klahan | Death in the line of duty fighting the Boworadet rebellion (posthumous) | 1933 |
| Bunchuai Sumanmat | | Klahan | Death in the line of duty fighting the Boworadet rebellion (posthumous) | 1933 |
| Da Thukhammi | | Klahan | Death in the line of duty fighting the Boworadet rebellion (posthumous) | 1933 |
| Lim Ngoencharoen | | Klahan | Death in the line of duty fighting the Boworadet rebellion (posthumous) | 1933 |
| Khun Praditsakonkan (Plai Chanpradit) | | Klahan | Death in the line of duty in Nakhon Ratchasima Province (posthumous) | 1933 |
| Thong Kaeng-opchoei | | Klahan | Death in the line of duty in Nakhon Ratchasima Province (posthumous) | 1933 |
| Khun Anwetwirayut (An Khamdet) | | Sinlapa Witthaya | | 1934 |
| Luang Katsongkhram (Thian Kengradomying) | | Klahan | | 1934 |
| Khun Photsorasak (Phot Junhavan) | | Klahan | | 1934 |
| Krasae Phongsuphat | | Klahan | | 1934 |
| Tu Charusthira | | Klahan | | 1934 |
| Suk Sangphraiwan | | Klahan | | 1934 |
| Nun Iamborisut | | Klahan | | 1934 |
| Duan Inwong | | Klahan | | 1934 |
| Malai Uppaphut | | Klahan | | 1934 |
| Singto Sangkat | | Klahan | | 1934 |
| Sai Chuprathum | | Klahan | | 1934 |
| Nut Angsopha | | Klahan | | 1934 |
| Phraya Phahonphonphayuhasena (Phot Bahalayodhin) | | Ratchakan Phaendin | | 1934 |
| Luang Phibunsongkhram (Plaek Khitasanga) | | Ratchakan Phaendin | | 1934 |
| Luang Aduldetcharat (Bat Phuengphrakhun) | | Ratchakan Phaendin | | 1935 |
| Luang La-o-phumilak (La-o Bunnag) | | Sinlapa Witthaya | | 1935 |
| Phra Aramronnachit (Ot Chulananda) | | Sinlapa Witthaya | | 1935 |
| Phra Roengrukpatchamit (Thong Raksa-ngop) | | Ratchakan Phaendin | (Posthumous) | 1935 |
| Luang Praditmanutham (Pridi Banomyong) | | Ratchakan Phaendin | | 1939 |
| Prince Wan Waithayakon Varavarna | (Previously awarded) | Ratchakan Phaendin | | 1939 |
| Chuen Nimitta | | Klahan | | 1939 |
| Sanit Tungkhamani | | Sinlapa Witthaya | | 1940 |
| Sanit Nuanmani | | Klahan | | 1940 |
| Chuan Suksoem | | Klahan | | 1940 |
| Chaloem Damsamrit | | Klahan | | 1940 |

=== 1941–present ===
| Name | Field | Year awarded |
|---|---|---|
| Sanguan Rojanawongs | | 1941 |
| Luang Nitwetchawisit | | 1941 |
| Prachak Thongprasoet | | 1941 |
| Phraya Anuman Rajadhon | | 1953 |
| Serm Vinicchayakul | | 1953 |
| Yut Saeng-uthai | | 1953 |
| Silpa Bhirasri | | 1953 |
| Charng Ratanarat | | 1953 |
| La-iat Phibunsongkhram | | 1956 |
| Prayun Phinsawat | | 1956 |
| Saman Bunyaratphan | | 1956 |
| Luean Phongsophon | | 1956 |
| Phra Worawetphisit | | 1959 |
| Phraya Atthakariniphon | | 1959 |
| Sri Daorai | | 1960 |
| Prasop Ratanakorn | | 1961 |
| Chuchat Kamphu | | 1964 |
| Chote Suvatti | | 1965 |
| Ouay Ketusingh | | 1966 |
| Phon Sangsingkeo | | 1966 |
| Thanat Khoman | | 1966 |
| Luang Phinphakphitthayaphet | | 1966 |
| Chaloem Puranananda | | 1966 |
| Sood Sangvichien | | 1966 |
| Luang Wisansinlapakam | | 1966 |
| Sombun Phong-aksara | | 1967 |
| Chalerm Prommas | | 1967 |
| Direk Jayanama | | 1967 |
| Udom Posakritsana | | 1967 |
| Wikit Wiranuwat | | 1967 |
| Boonrod Binthasan | | 1968 |
| Rapee Sagarik | | 1968 |
| Prakorb Tuchinda | | 1969 |
| Komol Pengsritong | | 1969 |
| Sanya Dharmasakti | | 1969 |
| Luang Chamrunnetisat | | 1969 |
| Duan Bunnag | | 1969 |
| Pravat Pattabongse | | 1969 |
| Pramun Suwannason | | 1969 |
| Phra Nitikanprasom | | 1969 |
| Kan Chonwichan | | 1969 |
| Sipraphai Phongakson | | 1969 |
| Charas Yamarat | | 1970 |
| Stang Mongkolsuk | | 1970 |
| Amphon Sichaiyan | | 1970 |
| Saeng Monwithun | | 1970 |
| Pinit Pattabongs | | 1971 |
| Pisit Buranasiri | | 1971 |
| Sukich Nimmanheminda | | 1971 |
| Montri Tramote | | 1971 |
| Paew Snidvongseni | | 1971 |
| Erb na Bangxang | | 1971 |
| Kamthorn Pantularp | Law | 1980 |
| At Wisutyothaphiban | Social sciences | 1980 |
| Vitoon Osathanondh | Medicine | 1980 |
| Saman Mantarbhorn | Medicine | 1980 |
| Prasert na Nagara | Humanities | 1980 |
| Subhadradis Diskul | Humanities | 1980 |
| Somsak Rakngam | Engineering | 1980 |
| Morakot Charnsamruat | Engineering | 1980 |
| Sommai Yotprasit | Engineering | 1980 |
| Phinit Surakun | Engineering | 1980 |
| Chamlong Harinasuta | Medicine | 1981 |
| Tem Smitinand | Natural sciences | 1981 |
| Pin Malakul | Education | 1982 |
| Ari Sitthimang | Agriculture | 1982 |
| Pradisth Cheosakul | Natural sciences | 1983 |
| Aree Valyasevi | Medicine | 1983 |
| Dutsadi Uppatham | Engineering | 1983 |
| Seni Pramoj | Law | 1984 |
| Tranakchit Harinasuta | Medicine | 1984 |
| Nat Bhamornprawat | Medicine | 1984 |
| Prawase Wasi | Medicine | 1984 |
| Visith Sitprija | Medicine | 1985 |
| Niran Chitanon | Engineering | 1985 |
| Virot Chomchuenchit | Engineering | 1985 |
| Kasame Chatikavanij | Engineering and administration | 1985 |
| Kampol Prachuabmoh | Medicine | 1986 |
| Samphat Phasanayongphinyo | Engineering | 1986 |
| Kalyanakit Kitiyakara | Medicine | 1987 |
| Kukrit Pramoj | Literature | 1987 |
| Teera Ramasoota | Medicine | 1987 |
| Sanga Sabhasri | Natural sciences and administration | 1987 |
| Princess Sirindhorn | Humanities | 1989 |
| Suporn Koetsawang | Medicine | 1991 |
| Queen Sirikit | | 1992 |
| Parttraporn Isarangkura | Medicine | 1994 |
| Sakorn Dhanamitta | Medicine | 1994 |
| Arun Pausawasdi | Medicine | 1994 |
| Amphon Senanarong | Agriculture | 1995 |
| Chomchark Chuntrasakul | Medicine | 1997 |
| Sornchai Looareesuwan | Medicine | 1997 |
| Chai-Anan Samudavanija | Social sciences | 1998 |
| Prayoon Kanchanadul | Law | 1998 |
| Phanphit Sakornphan | Medicine | 1998 |
| Athasit Vejjajiva | Medicine | 1998 |
| Pinyo Suwankiri | Architecture | 1999 |
| Phaibul Naiyanetr | Natural sciences | 1999 |
| Pranya Sakiyalak | Medicine | 1999 |
| Boonchob Pongpanich | Medicine | 1999 |
| Prapasna Uaychai | Law | 1999 |
| Panas Simasathien | Social sciences | 1999 |
| Amon Raksasat | Social sciences | 2000 |
| Praves Limparangsri | Visual arts (Thai architecture) | 2000 |
| Pinit Suwannabun | Visual arts (applied arts) | 2000 |
| Seri Wangnaitham | Visual arts (Thai dance) | 2000 |
| Stitaya Sirisinha | Natural sciences (Immunology) | 2000 |
| Montri Tuchinda | Medicine (Paediatric allergy) | 2000 |
| Sathienpong Wannapok | Humanities | 2002 |
| Chamnong Tongprasert | Humanities | 2003 |
| Saksri Yamnadda | Humanities | 2003 |
| Mana Pitayaporn | Law | 2003 |
| Vitit Muntarbhorn | Law | 2003 |
| Sawasdi Tantisuk | Visual arts | 2003 |
| Chanika Tuchinda | Medicine | 2003 |
| Therdchai Jivacate | Medicine | 2003 |
| Sumon Amornvivat | Education | 2004 |
| Suthiwong Pongpaiboon | Social sciences | 2004 |
| Suphachai Chaithiraphan | Medicine | 2004 |
| Kraisid Tontisirin | Medicine | 2005 |
| Decha Boonkham | Landscape architecture | 2005 |
| Jisnuson Svasti | Natural sciences | 2007 |
| Thara Tritrakarn | Medicine | 2007 |
| Yongyudh Vajaradul | Medicine | 2007 |
| Udom Warotamasikkhadit | Humanities | 2007 |
| Charoenchai Sundaravadin | Humanities | 2007 |
| Niyada Lausunthorn | Humanities | 2008 |
| Likhit Dhiravegin | Social sciences | 2008 |
| Kesree Narongdej | Social sciences | 2008 |
| Pilai Poonswad | Natural sciences | 2008 |
| Somsak Panyakeow | Engineering | 2008 |
| Yong Poovorawan | Medicine | 2008 |
| Surapol Issaragrisil | Medicine | 2008 |
| Mingsarn Kaosa-ard | Economics | 2008 |
| Chaiyos Hemarajata | Law | 2009 |
| Winai Dahlan | Natural sciences | 2009 |
| Suthat Fucharoen | Natural sciences | 2009 |
| Sakol Panyim | Natural sciences | 2009 |
| Somchai Wongwises | Engineering | 2009 |
| Arun Chaiseri | Engineering | 2009 |
| Vinai Suvatee | Medicine | 2009 |
| Sunthorn Tandhanand | Medicine | 2009 |
| Borwornsak Uwanno | Law | 2010 |
| Rawi Bhavilai | Natural sciences | 2010 |
| Samruay Shuangshoti | Medicine | 2010 |
| Panya Borisutdhi | Humanities | 2011 |
| Suraphol Wirunrak | Social sciences | 2011 |
| Prapon Wilairat | Natural sciences | 2011 |
| Wanpen Chaicumpa | Natural sciences | 2011 |
| Somsak Damronglerd | Engineering | 2011 |
| Somwang Danchaivijitr | Medicine | 2011 |
| Pongsak Visudhipun | Medicine | 2011 |
| Pensri Pootrakul | Medicine | 2011 |
| Sermsak Wisalaporn | Education | 2012 |
| Wissanu Krea-ngam | Law | 2012 |
| Nikorn Dusitsin | Medicine | 2012 |
| Kobchitt Limpaphayom | Medicine | 2012 |
| Watchara Kasinrerk | Medical technology | 2012 |
| Choochart Pitaksakorn | Education | 2013 |
| Prasert Sobhon | Natural sciences | 2013 |
| Vichai Reutrakul | Natural sciences | 2013 |
| Burana Chavalittamrong | Medicine | 2013 |
| Dasnayanee Chandanayingyong | Medicine | 2013 |
| Saichol Ketsa | Agriculture | 2013 |
| Petcharee Sumitra | History | 2013 |
| Mati Tungpanich | Architecture | 2013 |
| Srisurang Poolthupya | Humanities | 2014 |
| Sodsai Pantoomkomol | Humanities | 2014 |
| Somchai Thongtem | Natural sciences | 2014 |
| Nitaya Suwanwela | Medicine | 2014 |
| Ungkab Prakanrattana | Medicine | 2014 |
| Suchon Tangtaweewipat | Agriculture | 2014 |
| Pranee Kullavanijaya | Humanities | 2015 |
| Amaret Bhumiratana | Natural sciences | 2015 |
| Suttisak Soralump | Engineering | 2015 |
| Thamrongrat Keokarn | Medicine | 2015 |
| Poonpit Amatayakul | Music | 2015 |
| Ruenruthai Sujjapun | Humanities | 2016 |
| Nonglak Wiratchai | Education | 2016 |
| Pilaipan Puthavathana | Natural sciences | 2016 |
| Suthi Aksornkitti | Engineering | 2016 |
| Kriangsak Jirapaet | Medicine | 2016 |
| Kamheang Chaturachinda | Medicine | 2016 |
| Theera Tongsong | Medicine | 2016 |
| Tanomsri Srichaikul | Medicine | 2016 |
| Srichitra Bunnag | Medicine | 2016 |
| Navavan Bandhumedha | Humanities | 2017 |
| Wit Phinkhanngoen | Visual arts | 2017 |
| Vicha Mahakun | Law | 2017 |
| Charas Suwanwela | Medicine | 2017 |
| Charoen Chotigavanich | Medicine | 2017 |
| Rajata Rajatanavin | Medicine | 2017 |
| Santi Leksukhum | Humanities | 2018 |
| Kulwadee Makarabhirom | Humanities and social sciences | 2018 |
| Piyasan Praserthdam | Engineering | 2018 |
| Thiravat Hemachudha | Medicine | 2018 |
| Chaweewan Bunnag | Medicine | 2018 |
| Wandee Varavithya | Medicine | 2018 |
| Niwat Maneekarn | Medicine | 2018 |
| Nipon Chattipakorn | Medicine | 2018 |
| Somchai Pathumasutra | Medicine | 2018 |
| Peerasak Srinives | Agriculture | 2018 |
| Sujin Jinayon | Agriculture | 2018 |
| Kirati Boonchua | Ethics | 2018 |
| Thanin Kraivichien | Law | 2019 |
| Timothy William Flegel | Natural sciences | 2019 |
| Skorn Mongkolsuk | Natural sciences | 2019 |
| Supayang Voravuthikunchai | Natural sciences | 2019 |
| Saisamorn Lumyong | Natural sciences | 2019 |
| Pramook Mutirangura | Medicine | 2019 |
| Polrat Wilairatana | Medicine | 2019 |
| Apiwat Mutirangura | Medicine | 2019 |
| Supan Fucharoen | Medical technology | 2019 |
| Kusuma Raksamanee | Humanities | 2020 |
| Prakong Nimmanahaeminda | Humanities | 2020 |
| Suwilai Premsrirat | Humanities | 2020 |
| Krirkkiat Phipatseritham | Social sciences | 2020 |
| Surapongse Sotanasathien | Social sciences | 2020 |
| Boonsirm Withyachumnarnkul | Natural sciences | 2020 |
| Sutee Yoksan | Natural sciences | 2020 |
| Phadungsak Ratanadecho | Engineering | 2020 |
| Chaichan Phothirat | Medicine | 2020 |
| Sasithon Pukrittayakamee | Medicine | 2020 |
| Prapin Manomaivibool | Humanities | 2021 |
| Piyanart Bunnag | Humanities | 2021 |
| Wichit Srisa-an | Education | 2021 |
| Somsak Panha | Natural sciences | 2021 |
| Narisa Futrakul | Medicine | 2021 |
| Punnee Pitisuttithum | Medicine | 2021 |
| Pisake Lumbiganon | Medicine | 2021 |
| Worawit Louthrenoo | Medicine | 2021 |
| Kanchana Naksakul | Humanities | 2022 |
| Natchar Pancharoen | Fine arts (Music) | 2022 |
| Pranom Chantaranothai | Natural sciences | 2022 |
| Pharkphoom Panichayupakaranant | Natural sciences | 2022 |
| Bhinyo Panijpan | Natural sciences | 2022 |
| Siriporn Chattipakorn | Natural Sciences (Medical science) | 2022 |
| Visith Chavasit | Natural sciences (Food science and technology) | 2022 |
| Soottawat Benjakul | Agriculture | 2022 |
| Jowaman Khajarern | Agriculture | 2022 |
| Prapod Assavavirulhakarn | Humanities | 2023 |
| Renoo Wichasin | Humanities | 2023 |
| Somwang Pitiyanuwat | Education | 2023 |
| Somkit Lertpaithoon | Law | 2023 |
| Yongyuth Yuthavong | Natural sciences | 2023 |
| Vittaya Amornkitbamrung | Natural sciences | 2023 |
| Prasit Watanapa | Medicine | 2023 |
| Panupan Songcharoen | Medicine | 2023 |
| Arun Rojanasakul | Medicine | 2023 |

== Ribbon bar illustrations ==
=== Military and police members ===
- Pin of Services to the Monarch (เข็มราชการในพระองค์; Khem Ratchakan Nai Phra-ong)
- Pin of Acts of Charity (เข็มกรุณา; Khem Ka-runa)
- Pin of Service to the Nation (เข็มราชการแผ่นดิน; Khem Ratchakan Phaendin)
- Pin of Acts of Bravery (เข็มกล้าหาญ; Khem Klahan)
- Pin of Arts and Science (เข็มศิลปวิทยา; Khem Sinlapa Witthaya)

=== Civilian members ===
- Pin of Services to the Monarch (เข็มราชการในพระองค์; Khem Ratchakan Nai Phra-ong)
- Pin of Acts of Charity (เข็มกรุณา; Khem Ka-runa)
- Pin of Service to the Nation (เข็มราชการแผ่นดิน; Khem Ratchakan Phaendin)
- Pin of Acts of Bravery (เข็มกล้าหาญ; Khem Klahan)
- Pin of Arts and Science (เข็มศิลปวิทยา; Khem Sinlapa Witthaya)
