= Ratanarat =

Ratanarat is a surname. Notable people with the surname include:

- Charng Ratanarat (1904–1993), Thai chemist, government official and entrepreneur
- Chira Ratanarat (1940–2022), CEO of the Siam Chemicals Public Company (SCC)
- Thongtip Ratanarat (born 1942), Thai chemical engineer
