= Pattanath Srisukho =

Thai senior surgeon and healthcare executive.

- Born: October 28, 1958 (age 68); Thailand
- Citizenship: Thailand
- Education: Chiang Mai University (MD)
- Occupations: Surgeon, Healthcare Executive
- Years active: 1988–present
- Spouse: Chanwalee Srisukho
- Medical career
- Field: Surgery

Pattanath Srisukho (Thai: พัฒนัตถ์ ศรีสุโข; born October 28, 1958) is a Thai senior surgeon and healthcare executive based in Phichit Province. He is the former Head of the Surgical Department at Phichit Hospital and the founder of Srisukho Hospital. He is widely recognized as a pioneering surgeon who has served Phichit and the surrounding Health Region 3 for over three decades.

== Career and Background ==
Dr. Srisukho is the son of Amphorn Tanjaroen, a dressmaker who played a significant role in advocating for her children's education. He began his civil service career as a surgeon at Phichit Hospital in 1988 and served until 2008. During this period, he played a crucial role in establishing the foundations of the hospital’s surgical, emergency, and anesthesiology departments. Throughout his tenure, he treated a vast number of patients across the lower northern region of Thailand. Following his retirement from government service, he assumed the position of Director of Srisukho Hospital, a private community-focused hospital in Phichit.

== Personal and Family Life ==
Dr. Srisukho is married to Chanwalee Srisukho, an obstetrician-gynecologist and author. They have three sons, all of whom are physicians:

- M.D., M.Sc. Chanesd Srisukho: Director of SCMC (Srisukho Clinic & Medical Center). He graduated with a Doctor of Medicine (Honors) from Rangsit University and a Master of Science in Dermatology from Mae Fah Luang University, specializing in anti-aging and dermatology.
- Dr. Chiti Srisukho: Resident physician at Srisukho Hospital and Dr. Chiti Clinic in Phichit.
- Dr. Niratorn Srisukho: An obstetrician-gynecologist at Phichit Hospital and Deputy Director of the Digital Health Division, Office of the Permanent Secretary, Ministry of Public Health. He plays a key role in driving Thailand’s Digital Health policies.
