= Thongtip Ratanarat =

Thai chemist

- Born: 24 June 1942 (age 84)
- Occupation: Chemist
- Known for: Former executive director of Petroleum Institute of Thailand
- Spouse: Chira Ratanarat
- Children: Three sons

Khun Ying Thongtip Ratanarat (Thai: ทองทิพ รัตนะรัต, RTGS: Thongthip Ratanarat; born 24 June 1942) is a Thai chemical engineer. She is a member of the board of directors of The Siam Fine Chemicals and of the Foundation for the Petroleum Institute of Thailand (PTIT). From 1985 to 2005 she was the PTIT's executive director.

== Life and work ==
After completing her studies in chemical engineering, Khunying Thongtip Ratanarat became a research assistant at the University of Canterbury in Christchurch, New Zealand. When she returned to Thailand, she worked as a lecturer in chemical engineering at Chulalongkorn University in Bangkok. She was awarded an honorary doctorate in applied geophysics from Chiang Mai University in 2005. She also received an honorary PhD in chemical engineering from Kasetsart University for her work in 2013.

From 1985 to 2005 she was executive director of the Petroleum Institute of Thailand. Subsequently, she worked as an advisor to the PTT Public Co., Ltd. She is Member of the Board of Directors of The Siam Fine Chemicals. She was judge of the Platts Global Energy Awards in 2004, 2011 and 2013. She was the chairperson of the committee investigating the 2013 Rayong oil spill. She is also a member of the national advisory board of the Chulabhorn Research Institute in Bangkok and director emeritus of the Circum-Pacific Council for Energy and Mineral Resources.

Thongtip has sung with King Bhumibol Adulyadej's Au Saw Friday Band. She has been a lady-in-waiting to Queen Sirikit since 1973.

== Development of biofuels ==
During her career she encouraged the local production of natural gas and focussed particularly on the development of biofuels, to overcome the volatility of the petroleum market. By 2002 she observed that ‘vulnerability is the rule of the game’ due to instability and tension in the Middle East and the related terrorism threats. In terms of self-reliance Europe and Asia were therefore following the U.S. in looking for deriving energy from other sources. In 2004 she noted that Thailand needs a master plan to maximise the value of locally produced natural gas. In 2012 she was quoted as saying: ‘We should get more serious about joint development of biofuels as, in the future, oil prices will definitely increase. It will also help strengthen the Asean Economic Community as we could all grow, blend, sell and consume by ourselves’. She urged the government to encourage the use of E20 and E85 ethanol blended fuel among Thai motorists.

== Family ==
She is a sister of Thongchat Hongladarom, the first governor of PTT, when it was still a state enterprise.

She married in 1969 Chira Ratanarat, who is now the chief executive officer of The Siam Chemicals Public Company (SCC), and has with him three sons: Tisanu Ratanarat (born 1974), Sichart Ratanarat (born 1976) and Porapong Ratanarat (born 1982).

== Publications ==
- Thongtip Ratanarat; et al. (1987). Population policy background paper for the sixth national economic and social development plan. Thailand Development Research Institute; Human Resources Institute, Thammasat University.
- Thongtip Ratanarat; et al. (2003). From banana leaf to plastic bag (PDF). The Petroleum Institute of Thailand.
