= Rapée =

Rapée is a given name and surname. Notable people with this given name or surname include:

- Rapee Sagarik (1922–2018), Thai agronomist
- Ernö Rapée (1891–1945), American symphonic conductor
- George Rapée (1915–1999), American bridge player
