= Yoksan =

Yoksan is the romanization of unrelated Indonesian and Thai given names and surnames. Notable people with the name include:

- Yoksan Ama (born 1986), Indonesian footballer
- Sutee Yoksan (born 1949), Thai research physician
