= Petroleum Institute of Thailand =

- Petroleum Institute of Thailand (PTIT)
- Headquarters: Bangkok
- Members: 37 full members in the petroleum industry and 58 ordinary members
- Website: www.ptit.org

The Petroleum Institute of Thailand (PTIT) is a non-profit organisation supporting the upstream oil and gas industry as well as the downstream petroleum and petrochemical industry in Thailand.

== History ==
The Petroleum Institute of Thailand was founded on 26 September 1985 with support from the government, academic, industrial and private sector interests. It is directed by the Foundation Board, the Advisory Board to the Council of Trustees and the Council of Trustees, which control the Institute's operations and give advice on financing the Institute's wide range of activities.

From 1985 to 2005 Khunying Thongtip Ratanarat was Executive Director of the institute. Now the Foundation Board and Advisory Board to the Council of Trustees are chaired by Privy Councilor Kamthon Sindhvanada.

== Mission ==
The institute encourages and supports the development of the petroleum, petrochemical and related industries. It provides human resource development services and information services. It supports research and development in industry and encourages an open dialogue between the government, industry and academia for establishing practical public policies and regulations as well as prudent industry standards and best practices.

The work of the institute is related to public policies and regulations:

- Exploration and production
- Refining & petrochemical processing
- Logistics and marketing

The institute communicates proactively with the public to facilitate a mutual understanding and to strengthen the public image of the industry. It acts as an impartial and independent know-how provider and fosters the continuous competitiveness and sustainability of the petroleum and petrochemical industry especially in the areas of health, safety and environment as well as operations.

== Membership ==
Full members are:

- Bangkok Synthetics Co., Ltd.
- Bayer Thai Co., Ltd.
- BG Asia Pacific Pte Limited
- CEC International, Ltd. (Thailand Branch)
- Chevron (Thailand) Limited
- Chevron Thailand Exploration and Production Ltd.
  - Chevron Offshore (Thailand) Limited
- ECO Orient Energy (Thailand) Limited
- Electricity Generating Authority of Thailand
- Esso (Thailand) Public Co., Ltd.
  - ExxonMobil Exploration and Production Khorat, Inc.
- Evonik (Thailand) Ltd.
- Glow Co., Ltd.
- IRPC Public Co., Ltd.
- KrisEnergy Oil & Gas (Thailand) Co., Ltd.
- Mitsui Oil Exploration Co., Ltd. (MOECO)
- Moeco Thai Oil Development Co., Ltd.
- Mubadala Petroleum (Thailand) Limited
- Ophir Thailand (E&P) Limited
- PTT Exploration and Production Public Co., Ltd.
- PTT Siam Co., Ltd.
- PTT Global Chemical Public Co., Ltd.
  - TOC Glycol Co., Ltd Thai Oleochemicals Co., Ltd.
  - Thai Ethanolamines Co., Ltd.
  - PTT AR
- PTT Public Co., Ltd.
- Rayong Olefins Co., Ltd.
- SCG-Dow Group
  - Siam Polystyrene Co., Ltd.
  - Siam Styrene Monomer Co., Ltd.
  - Siam Synthetic Latex Co., Ltd.
  - Siam Polyethylene Co., Ltd.
  - SD Group Service Co., Ltd
- Schlumberger Overseas S.A.
- Siam Mitsui PTA Co., Ltd.
- Star Petroleum Refining Public Co., Ltd.
- Thai MMA Co., Ltd.
- Thai Oil Public Co., Ltd.
- Thai Plastic and Chemicals Plc.
- TPC Paste Resin Co., Ltd.
- Thai Polyethylene Co., Ltd.
- Thai-MC Co., Ltd.
- The Bangchak Petroleum Public Co., Ltd.
- The Industrial Estate Authority of Thailand
- The Shell Company of Thailand Limited
- Total E&P Thailand
- Vinythai Public Co., Ltd.
