= Sanguan Rojanavongse =

Thai surgeon

Sanguan Rojanavongse (Thai: สงวน โรจนวงศ์, RTGS: Sa-nguan Rotchanawong; 7 June 1905 – 5 August 1987) was a Thai surgeon. He graduated from the Siriraj Hospital Faculty of Medicine of Chulalongkorn University in 1929, then trained in surgery and worked at Siriraj Hospital, also attaining fellowships at the Royal Faculty of Physicians and Surgeons of Glasgow and the International College of Surgeons. He transferred to the Army Medical Department in 1935, and attended to injured personnel during the Franco-Thai War, for which he was awarded the Dushdi Mala Medal in 1941. He eventually reached the rank of major general in the Army, was named to the board of the University of Medical Sciences in 1952, and served as President of the Medical Association of Thailand from 1960 to 1961.
