= Pilai Poonswad =

Thai biologist specialising in hornbills

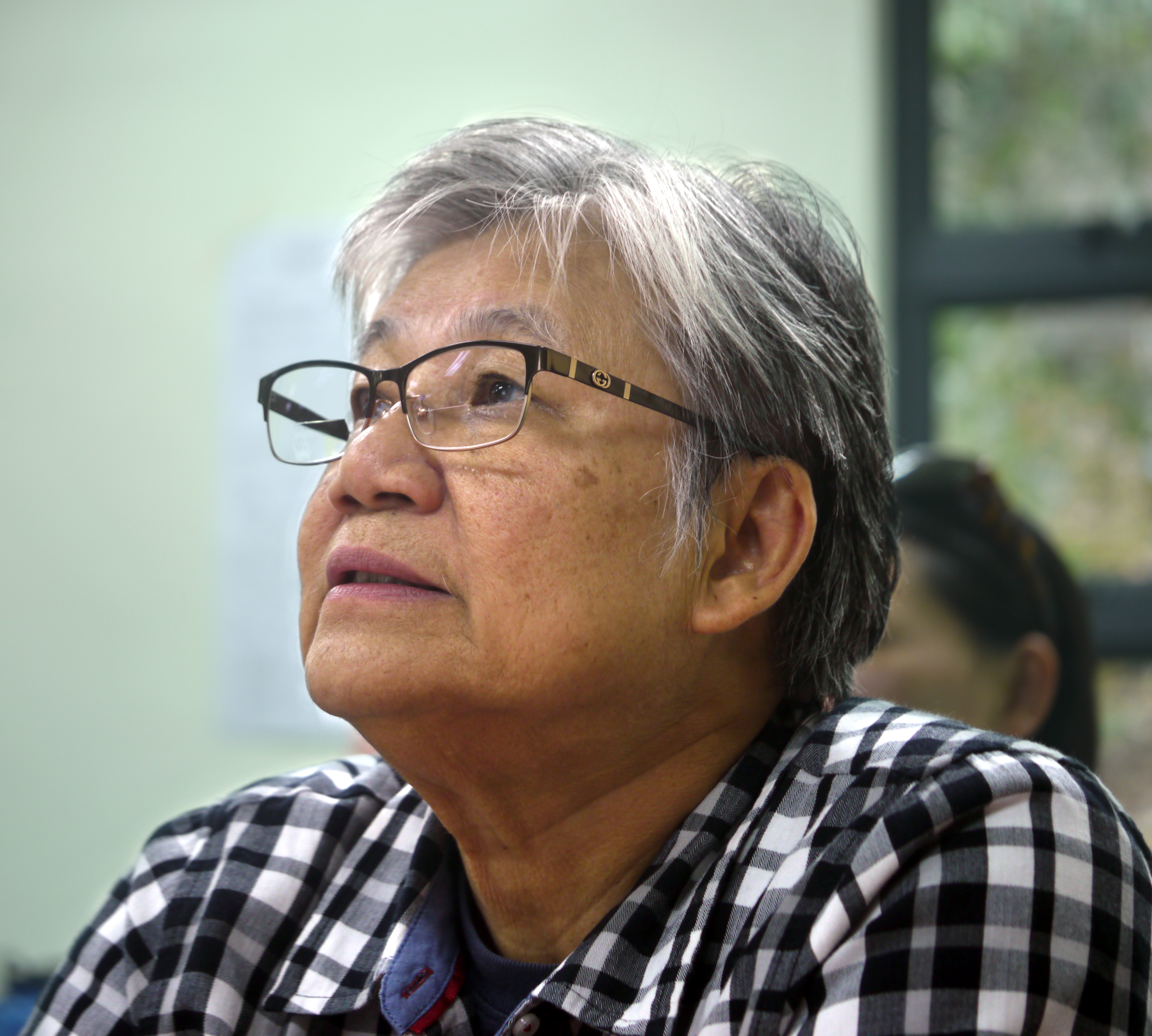
Dr Poonswad in 2017

Pilai Poonswad (born 23 November 1946) is an ornithologist, microbiologist and conservation biologist from Thailand. Her work has been on the ecology and conservation of hornbills. She is an emeritus professor of biology at the department of microbiology in Mahidol University.

Poonswad was born in 1946 and studied nuclear physics for her graduate diploma at Chulalongkorn University before a master's degree in microbiology and a D.Sc. from Osaka City University. She began to study hornbills in 1978 after acting as a guide to a BBC filming team in Khao Yai National Park. She noted the decline of hornbills and the destruction of forests and in an innovative project recruited poachers who had an intimate knowledge of forests and their animals to help in conservation. She received a Rolex Award in 2006, and the Dushdi Mala Medal from the Thai King Bhumibhol (King Rama IX) in 2007.
