= Sombun Phong-aksara =

Thai medical doctor

Sombun Phong-aksara (Thai: สมบุญ ผ่องอักษร, RTGS: Phong-akson) was a Thai medical doctor. He graduated medicine from the Faculty of Medicine Siriraj Hospital, and obtained master's and doctorate degrees in public health from Harvard University and Johns Hopkins University, respectively. His work focused on the tuberculosis situation in Thailand, and as the director of the Department of Disease Control's Chest Disease Clinic, led the first nationwide tuberculosis-control plan in the 1950s. He was the first President of the Medical Council of Thailand, and served as Deputy Minister of Public Health.
