= Chanwalee Srisukho =

Thai obstetrician-gynecologist, writer, and public health advocate

- Born: 1958 (age 67–68); Chiang Mai, Thailand
- Citizenship: Thailand
- Occupations: Obstetrician-gynecologist, writer, & Public health advocate
- Medical career
- Field: Obstetrics and gynaecology

Chanwalee Srisukho (born 1958), also known as Mor View, is a Thai obstetrician-gynecologist, writer, and public health advocate. .She is known for her long-term medical service in rural areas of Phichit Province, as well as her work in health education, public communication, and literature.

== Early life and education ==
Chanwalee Srisukho was born in 1958 in Chiang Mai. She grew up in a poor background and pursued medical education in Thailand, graduated from Chiang Mai University by scholarship. She met her future husband, Pattanath Srisukho when they worked as internship at Phuttha Chinnarat hospital, Phitsanulok. She later specialized in obstetrics and gynecology at Siriraj Hospital.

== Career ==
=== Medical practice ===
Chanwalee Srisukho began her medical career as a rural physician in the late 1980s, serving communities in Phichit Province. Her work has focused on maternal healthcare, preventive medicine, and public health outreach in underserved areas. She later co-developed a private medical practice with Pattanath Srisukho, which expanded into Srisukho Polyclinic and eventually became Srisukho Hospital in the late 2000s, where she continues to practice as an obstetrician-gynecologist.

Chanwalee Srisukho has served in professional medical governance roles, including long-term involvement as committee of the Medical Council of Thailand.

=== Media and public communication ===
Chanwalee Srisukho is well known in Thailand for her participation in health-related television programming focused on obstetrics and gynecology, contributing to public health education and awareness. Her public activities include health education talks and media appearances aimed at improving reproductive health knowledge. She is also a known, award Thai writer.

=== Writing ===
Chanwalee Srisukho has authored numerous books in Thailand, including health education materials, scientific knowledge books for youth audiences, and fictional works exploring cultural and social themes.

== Philanthropy ==
Chanwalee Srisukho has been involved in charitable healthcare and social initiatives, particularly in rural communities. During the COVID-19 pandemic, she participated in efforts related to vaccine procurement and distribution to underserved populations in Thailand, in support of national public health initiatives. She has also contributed to educational and community welfare initiatives.

== Awards and honors ==
Chanwalee Srisukho has received recognition for her contributions to healthcare, public service, and literature, including:

- Chommanard Book Prize (2013), for the work Phrueksa Mata (Mother Nature), jointly recognized alongside Sirinrampai Praphanthawee for One Life Before Sunset
- National recognition for public service and sacrifice, awarded by a Thai governmental body
- National Good Female Award, presented by the Thai Lady Foundation.

== Personal life ==
Chanwalee Srisukho is married to Pattanath Srisukho. The couple have 3 children, including a son who later established a medical clinic in Bangkok.

== Interview with Chanyawalee Srisukho (Dr. View), July 13, 2026 ==
Interviewer "Getting to Know Dr. View: A Personal Biography, Could you share your personal background?"

Chanwalee Srisukho "I have been around for quite a while, so my history is a bit long! Allow me to share my Curriculum Vitae.

Curriculum Vitae, Name: Dr. Chanwalee Srisukho (Dr. View). Education & Academic Qualifications: Doctor of Medicine (M.D.), Chiang Mai University, Class 19 (1983). Diploma of the Thai Board of Obstetrics and Gynecology, Siriraj Hospital, Mahidol University (1988). Certifications: Certificate of Expert in Medical Litigation, Class 2 (2023). Certificate of Medical Law, Class 1 (2025).

Professional Experience & Positions: Expert Obstetrician and Gynecologist with 39 years of government service. Head of the Obstetrics and Gynecology Department and President of the Medical Staff Organization, Phichit Hospital (1988-2021). Deputy Director, Srisukho Hospital (2021-Present). Elected Member of the Medical Council of Thailand (2013-Present). Member of the Subcommittee on Ethical Investigation, Medical Council of Thailand. Member of the Subcommittee on Ethical Screening, Medical Council of Thailand. Member of the Subcommittee on Medical Skill Enhancement, Medical Council of Thailand. Member of the Subcommittee on Community Medical Procedures, Medical Council of Thailand. Former Spokesperson for the Medical Council of Thailand (2013-2019). Health Expert, National Strategy and Family Committee, Ministry of Social Development and Human Security (2019-2021). Expert Member, Phichit Provincial Subcommittee for Family Promotion and Development (2022-Present).

First Vice President, The Writers Association of Thailand (2025-2027). Literary & Media Contributions: Author of 66 published books, including articles, academic narratives, novels, short stories, tales, youth literature, and documentaries. Guest Speaker on the radio and TV programs "Chu Rak Chu Rot" and "Chu Rak Chu Rot Live" (2001-Present). Columnist for Cheewajit Magazine (2002-Present). Columnist for Salesian Magazine (2022-Present). Literary Awards: Recipient of 18 literary awards, most recently winning the First Prize in the Chommanard Book Prize for the documentary "Pruksa Mata" (2012).

Honors & Prestige Awards: Outstanding Alumni in Academics, Wattanothaipayap School (2005). Outstanding Medical Alumni, Chiang Mai University (2015). Outstanding National Thai Language User, Ministry of Culture (2019). Outstanding Thai Woman, National Council of Women of Thailand under the Royal Patronage (2020). Social Sacrifice Award, Ministry of Social Development and Human Security (2022). Juvenile Arkon Award (for assisting children and youth), Associate Judges of Phichit (2022). Sri Suwan Phingkhan Award (Honoring Local Artists in Literature), Naresuan University (2023). Her Awards, UNFPA Thailand (United Nations Population Fund) (2024). Outstanding Individual in Family Development, Ministry of Social Development and Human Security (2025). Role Model for Good Deeds for the Nation, The Senate of Thailand (2025)

Chanwalee Srisukho (Dr. View) July 13, 2026

#DrChanwalee #DrView #SrisukhoHospital #Obstetrician #Gynecologist #MedicalCouncilOfThailand #ThaiWriters #WomensHealth #MedicalExpert #InspirationalWomen #FamilyDevelopment #Phichit
