= Charoenchai Sundaravadin =

Thai classical singer

Charoenchai Sundaravadin (Thai: เจริญใจ สุนทรวาทิน, RTGS: Suntharawathin; 16 September 1915 – 10 April 2011) was an expert singer and musician of Thai classical music. She was born into a noble musician family, and learned the art from her father Phraya Sanoduriyang. She was a musician in the royal court of Queen Rambai Barni, and became a school teacher following the abolition of absolute monarchy in 1932. She left the civil service during World War II, and later became a lecturer at Chulalongkorn University. She was named a National Artist in performing arts in 1987.
