= Rawi Bhavilai =

Thai astronomer and writer

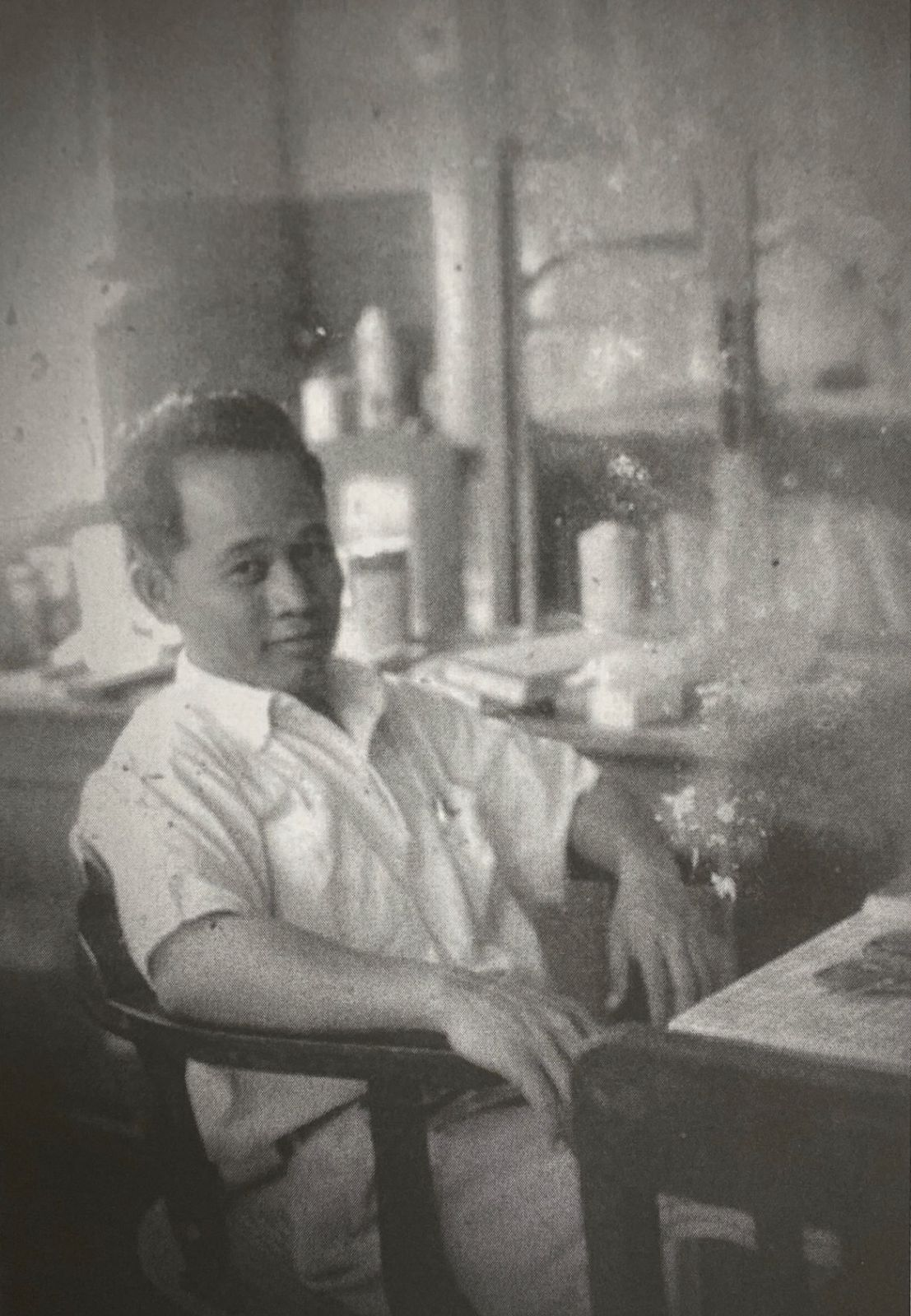
Rawi Bhavilai

Rawi Bhavilai (Thai: ระวี ภาวิไล, RTGS: Rawi Phawilai; also spelled Rawee Pawilai; 17 October 1925 – 17 March 2017) was a Thai astronomer, writer and translator. He served as a professor at the Physics Department of the Faculty of Science, Chulalongkorn University, and was known for his writings on astronomy as well as philosophy and religion. He was a fellow of the Royal Society of Thailand, and was named National Artist in literature in 2006.
