= Niyada Lausunthorn =

Niyada Lausunthorn (Thai: นิยะดา เหล่าสุนทร, RTGS: Niyada Laosunthon; born 1 August 1948) is a Thai scholar and expert on historical Thai literature. She served as a professor at Kasetsart University's Faculty of Humanities, and has written numerous volumes based on her research on ancient manuscripts of Thai literary works. She is a Fellow of The Royal Society of Thailand.
