= Kobchitt Limpaphayom =

Khunying Kobchitt Limpaphayom (Thai: กอบจิตต์ ลิมปพยอม, RTGS: Kopchit Limpaphayom; born 1940) is a Thai obstetrician and gynaecologist. Her work includes pioneering birth control techniques in Thailand (especially intrauterine devices and minimally invasive tubal ligation methods), studies on postmenopausal health, and promoting countrywide screening and prevention of cervical cancer. She also worked in the field of medical education, and served as President of the Royal Thai College of Obstetricians and Gynaecologists, and committee member of the Medical Council of Thailand. She is professor emeritus at the Faculty of Medicine, Chulalongkorn University.
