= Natchar Pancharoen =

Thai pianist and music theorist

Natchar Pancharoen (Thai: ณัชชา พันธุ์เจริญ, RTGS: Natcha Phancharoen) is a Thai piano soloist and music theorist. She is known for techniques in applying Western classical music styles to traditional Thai melodies, as well as academic work as a professor at Chulalongkorn University's Faculty of Fine and Applied Arts.
