= Chira Ratanarat =

Chira Ratanarat (Thai: จิระ รัตนะรัต; 3 June 1940 – 13 March 2022) was the chief executive officer of The Siam Chemicals Public Company (SCC).

== Life and work ==
=== Siam Chemicals ===
After obtaining a master's degree in Automotive Engineering from the University of Stuttgart, Chira Ratanarat became the chief executive officer of The Siam Chemicals Public Company (SCC). The company had been founded by his father for the manufacture of basic chemicals for Thai downstream industries, such as sulfuric acid, hydrochloric acid, various bases and salts.

Chira Ratanarat modernised the business which now blends and trades various chemicals, fertilisers and lubricants. The company is now one of Thailand's largest lube makers. It produces 5 million litres per month and supplies to more than 60 brands in Asia with the plan to double capacity to 10 million litres by 2016.

=== Safe Flying Service ===
He manages also the Safe Flying Service SFS Aviation which provide onshore and offshore helicopter flight services and runs an AgustaWestland Helicopter authorized maintenance service centre.

=== Radio control vehicles ===
He is one of the pioneers of radio control (R/C) vehicles in Thailand. For more than twenty years he got deeply involved in R/C car racing and during that period he hosted two R/C Car World Championship racing events in Thailand. He became champion on R/C scale car. Later he focussed on R/C flying and got interested in model jets and obtained his first two model turbine engines in 1995. He advises the Thai army on the design and operation of unmanned aerial vehicles (UAVs) also known as drones.

== Family ==
He married in 1969 Khunying Thongtip Ratanarat and has with her three sons: Tisanu Ratanarat (born 1974), Sichart Ratanarat (born 1976) and Porapong Ratanarat (born 1982).

== Honors ==
Chira Ratanarat was honored with the German Federal Cross of Merit (German: Bundesverdienstkreuz), the highest federal decoration of Germany in recognition of his work related contributions to Germany.

He received the 1st Class Honour Award from King Hassan II of Morocco.

He is an honorary member of the Alumni Network of the University of Stuttgart, which honors people, who have a special relationship to the University of Stuttgart or who are especially committed to the alumni program.
