= Siam Chemicals =

Thai chemical company

The Siam Chemicals Public Company (SCC)
- Type: Co., Ltd.
- Industry: Chemicals
- Founded: 1959; 67 years ago
- Headquarters: Bangkok, Thailand
- Products: Chemicals, such as sulfuric acid, hydrochloric acid, various bases and salts, fertilisers and lubricants
- Website: www.siamchemicals.co.th

The Siam Chemicals Public Company (SCC) blends and trades chemicals, fertilisers and lubricants and manufactures basic chemicals for downstream industries such as sulfuric acid, hydrochloric acid, various bases and salts.

== History ==
The company was founded as The Siam Chemicals Company Limited in 1959 by Dr. Charng Ratanarat and a group of scientists, engineers and businessmen. Dr. Charng Ratanarat had studied in Germany and had the vision to make Thailand independent from importing bulk chemicals, commodities and supplies. He wanted to become the first producer of chemicals for the downstream industry in Thailand such as sulphuric acid and agricultural fertilizers. He set-up the company to support Thailand's industry and agriculture with locally produced chemicals. He started in 1960 to produce sulfuric acid.

A state of the art plant for the mass production of sulfuric acid was completed by 1966. It operated with the double absorption system, which was the first in Southeast Asia. Other chemical products included nitrous oxide and potash alum. The Siam Chemicals Company Limited was the first in Thailand to produce bulk blend fertilizer in 1968 which was marketed under the brand name Three Nagas. The construction of Wharf 5C, the company's riverside harbor and port was completed in 1971 and general cargo warehouses and a tank farm were built. As the first Thai company it produced lubrication oil for the Petroleum Authority of Thailand (PTT) since 1983.

In 1994 the company was registered as Public Company with a registered capital of 200 million Baht under the management of the son of the company founder, Chira Ratanarat, who had obtained a master's degree in Automotive Engineering from the University of Stuttgart. The registered capital increased quickly by four times to 800 million Baht in 2009. Since 1995 liquid tank farm services from ship to shore were provided, to store fuels, solvents and drummed liquid goods for land transport. In 1996 oil trading commenced as certified oil importer in an exclusive collaboration with the National Petroleum of Kuwait Plc, and Huyndai Global Oil Co., Korea. In 1997 the group's laboratory for analytical chemistry was registered with the Ministry of Industry for analyzing waste water and pollutants, to provide services also to other factories in Samutprakarn. In 2009 a CNC machine centre was installed to produce bespoke spare parts.

The S-Chem Group was set-up in 2010 as a group of companies with the same core management for Siam Fine Chemicals Co. Ltd, SFS Aviation Co., Ltd, the Southern Oxygen Co. Ltd., ChiraTech Maxima Research Group and the Phoenix Petroleum Co., Ltd. Business Development. The application of research results into industrial scale was fully implemented by 2012, for instance the design, installation and operation of blending units to blend fuel and lubrication oils. The research focusses on ethanol fuel, ethanol engine lubricants and engine-modifications to run on ethanol fuel.

In 2013 the oil business was revived. The company is now one of Thailand's largest lube makers. It produces 5 million litres per month and supplies to more than 60 brands in Asia with the plan to double capacity to 10 million litres by 2016.

== Companies within the Group ==
=== The Siam Fine Chemicals ===
The Siam Fine Chemicals manufactures engine and industrial lubricants and trades base oils and solvents and provides rental services for warehouses and tanks. It provides modern laboratory and analysis services including cold-cranking simulation, Karl Fischer titration, Fourier transform infrared spectroscopy and X-Ray fluorescence spectroscopy.

=== SFS Aviation ===
SFS Aviation provides low risk and cost effective helicopter services to the oil and gas industry as mean of transport to and from the Si-Chang Island Deep Sea Oil Terminal. The company was set-up in 1990 as part of the Siam Chemicals Group of companies, by Chira Ratanarat, a helicopter pilot with more than 1000 flying hours.

It was the first civilian helicopter operator in Thailand and has more than 20 years of experience with onshore operation with two BK 117 with no major incidents. The company owns and operates two MBB/Kawasaki BK 117, three Sikorsky S76C+ and three AgustaWestland AW139. Currently it has two operating bases in Thailand: the Bangkok base located at Don Mueang International Airport and one at Songkhla.

=== The Southern Oxygen Company Ltd. (SOC) ===
The Southern Oxygen Company Ltd. was established in 1966 in Thung Song with a registered capital of 2 million Baht and has now registered capital of 50 million Baht. It produces oxygen for industrial use in southern Thailand. It has produces a variety of gases used in hospitals and for medical purposes, including oxygen, argon, nitrous oxide, nitrogen and coolants for air-conditioners and fills these into cylinders. Recently, the company has acquired real estate in Nakhon Srithammarat and Surathani, and produces bulk-blended fertilizers in the Phayao Province.
