= Chaloem Puranananda =

Thai physician

Chaloem Puranananda (Thai: เฉลิม บูรณะนนท์, RTGS: Burananon) was a Thai physician, best known for his work with the Thai Red Cross Society. He served as director of the society's Queen Saovabha Memorial Institute, overseeing research and development of vaccines and antitoxins, and pioneered the establishment of a national blood bank operated by the Red Cross in 1952. The blood service unit led the development of transfusion medicine Thailand, and became established as the National Blood Centre 1966, with Chaloem as its first director, serving until 1974.
