= Sutee Yoksan =

Thai scientist (born 1949)

Sutee Yoksan (Thai: สุธี ยกส้าน, RTGS: Suthi Yoksan; born 1949) is a Thai research physician, known for his work on dengue vaccines, as well as those against other mosquito-borne diseases. He is an emeritus professor at Mahidol University, where he headed its Center for Vaccine Development from 1991 until his retirement in 2014 and now holds an advisory position. His work forms the basis of Takeda's Qdenga vaccine, which was approved in the European Union in 2022. He received the Dushdi Mala Medal, Pin of Arts and Science in 2020.
