= Saksri Yamnadda =

Thai scholar

Saksri Yamnadda (Thai: ศักดิ์ศรี แย้มนัดดา, RTGS: Saksi Yaemnatda; 17 October 1930 – 3 January 2002) was a Thai scholar. He was an expert in the Thai language, literature and poetry, and taught Thai language, as well as Pali and Sanskrit, as a professor at the Faculty of Arts of Chulalongkorn University. He wrote several textbooks on Thai literature, and translated over 100 works of Sanskrit literature into Thai.
