= Sood Sangvichien =

Thai physician

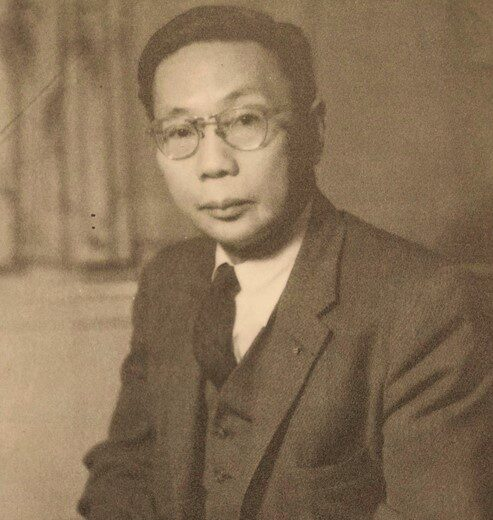
Sood Sangvichien

Sood Sangvichien (Thai: สุด แสงวิเชียร, RTGS: Sut Saengwichian; 29 November 1907 – 8 June 1995) was a Thai medical doctor and anatomist. He taught anatomy at the Siriraj Hospital Faculty of Medicine, where he was a professor and served as head of the anatomy department and later dean of the faculty. He was particularly known for his work in archaeology and physical anthropology, which he pioneered in Thailand, making the first detailed studies of prehistoric skeletal remains in the 1960s.
