= Rapee Sagarik =

Thai botanist (1922–2018)

Rapee Sagarik (Thai: ระพี สาคริก, RTGS: Raphi Sakhrik; 4 December 1922 – 17 February 2018) was a Thai horticulturist, botanist and orchid expert. He was a professor at Kasetsart University and served as its president from 1972 to 1980. In addition to scientifically studying and cataloging orchids, for which he became known as the "father of Thai orchidology", he also worked in rice cultivar development and agriculture research, and served as Deputy Minister of Agriculture and Cooperatives.

== Early life and education ==
Rapee Sagarik was born on 4 December 1922 in Worachak Sub-district, Pom Prap Sattru Phai District, Bangkok. He is the eldest son of Nueng Sagarik and Sanit Phamornsut, out of six children.

Rapee started primary education at Samsen Witthayakhan School and then in 1953, he moved to Satri Chulalak school until 1928. From 1928 to 1930 he studied at Saint Gabriel's College, then took further study during 1931–1932 at the Yaowakumarn School under Royal Patronage and received two certificates from the Ministry of Education. During 1940–1985, he studied at the Kasetsart University Preparatory School (now Maejo University) at Maejo, Chiang Mai Province (which was established as a five-year bachelor's degree program of Kasetsart University in 1943). In 1947, he graduated in pedology from the Faculty of Agriculture, Kasetsart University. He later received an honorary doctorate degree in Agricultural Innovation from Rangsit University on 23 February 2015.

== Career ==
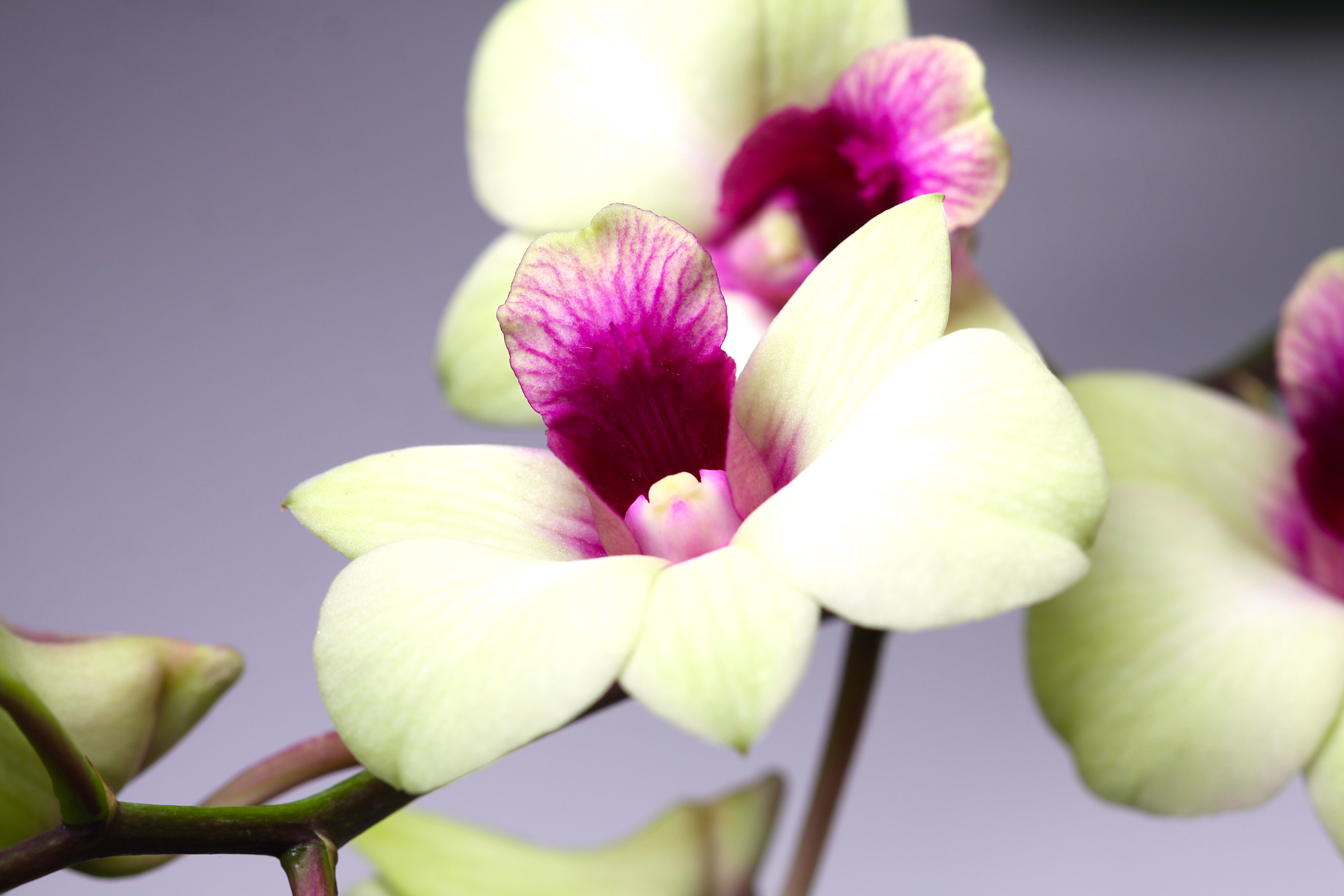
Orchid flower commemorating the cremation ceremony of Rapee Sagarik

Rapee was approached by Kasetsart University to become a full-time instructor. However, due to his passion for fieldwork, he chose to work at an agricultural experiment station in Mae Jo as a temporary employee assigned to conduct research on rice, vegetable and tobacco varieties. Meanwhile, he also conducted research on orchids using his own funds, an activity which would later become a fixture in his life. He was devoted to orchid research, and would become internationally recognized in the field of orchidology as one of its foremost experts. Having done research at the station for two years, he returned to government service as a full-time lecturer at Kasetsart University.

His work on research and promotion of orchids, both in cultivar development and propagation, as well as development as an export industry, made Thai orchids an important agricultural export product of Thailand. In recognition, Rapee received the Dushdi Mala Medal from King Bhumibol for agriculture work. He was named a professor in 1970.

Rapee served as the President of Kasetsart University, and as Deputy Minister of Agriculture and Cooperatives in the government of Prime Minister Kriangsak Chamanan. He held many other positions, even after retiring. He was widely recognized for his work, especially in education and orchidology, and was popularly named the "father of Thai orchidology".

During the 2006 political crisis, he jointly signed a royal petition asking for the king's intervention in naming a prime minister, and was a consultant to the People's Alliance for Democracy.

== Personal life ==
Rapee Sagarik was married to Kalaya Montriwat (daughter of Phichai Montri, Chief of the Free Thai Movement in Kanchanaburi during World War II). They had four children.

After 1990, he resigned from the various public and private positions he held, to turn to a peaceful and simple life, though he continued to accept invitations for lectures, especially in rural and youth development, focusing on morality and ethics.

== Death ==
Rapee died on 17 February 2018 due to blood poisoning at the age of 95.

== Royal decorations ==
Rapee received the following royal decorations in the Honours System of Thailand:

- Knight Grand Cordon (Special Class) of The Most Noble Order of the Crown of Thailand
- Knight Grand Cross(First Class) of the Most Exalted Order of the White Elephant
