= Somsak Panyakeow =

Thai electrical engineering researcher (born 1947)

Somsak Panyakeow (Thai: สมศักดิ์ ปัญญาแก้ว, RTGS: Somsak Panyakaeo; born 1947) is a Thai electrical engineering researcher. He pioneered research on photovoltaics and lasers in Thailand, establishing the semiconductor research laboratory at the Faculty of Engineering of Chulalongkorn University, where he holds a professorship. His research, which also focuses on nanoelectronics, has earned him multiple awards from the National Research Council of Thailand.
