= Nikorn Dusitsin =

Nikorn Dusitsin (Thai: นิกร ดุสิตสิน, RTGS: Nikon Dusitsin; born 1931) is a Thai obstetrician and gynaecologist and a scholar and advocate of reproductive health and sex education. He is an emeritus professor at the Faculty of Medicine of Chulalongkorn University, and also headed the Center for Study in Human Sexuality at the university's Institute of Health Research. His works span the areas of contraception methods, to developing sex education materials for schools, to postmenopausal health.
