= Phraya Sanoduriyang =

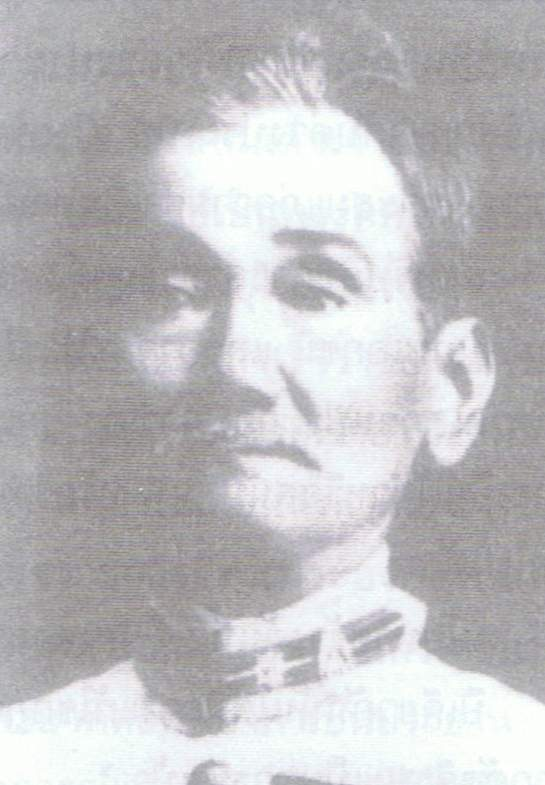

Cham Sundaravadin (Thai: แช่ม สุนทรวาทิน, RTGS: Chaem Suntharawathin or Sunthonwathin; 1866–1949), better known by his noble title Phraya Sanoduriyang (พระยาเสนาะดุริยางค์), was a Thai court musician who served in the royal courts of kings Chulalongkorn (Rama V) to Prajadhipok (Rama VII). He was highly regarded as an expert of Thai classical music, receiving the Dushdi Mala Medal as recognition in 1908, and was one of the only two court musicians to achieve the noble rank of phraya.
