= Therdchai Jivacate =

Thai orthopedic surgeon and inventor (born 1941)

Therdchai Jivacate (Thai: เทอดชัย ชีวะเกตุ, RTGS: Thoetchai Chiwaket, born 1941) is a Thai orthopedic surgeon and inventor known for his humanitarian activities in providing free prosthetic limbs to impoverished amputees, and for his development of techniques allowing low-cost, high-quality prostheses to be made from local materials. The activities of the Prostheses Foundation, which he founded in 1992 under royal sponsorship from the Princess Mother Srinagarindra, have expanded beyond the borders of Thailand to Malaysia, Laos, and Burma. Jivacate has established Thailand's first and only educational institution of occupational therapy at Chiang Mai University. He has also created an educational programme for children suffering from chronic diseases at Maharaj Hospital in Nakhon Ratchasima. In 2008, he was given the Ramon Magsaysay Award for Public Service.

In addition to his work with humans, Dr Jivacate has also designed prosthetic limbs for elephants who have been injured by landmines.

== Early life ==
Therdchai Jivacate graduated from the Faculty of Medicine of Chulalongkorn University in 1965. From 1968 to 1972 he was a resident of physical medicine and rehabilitation in Northwestern University, while from 1972 to 1975 he specialized in orthopedic surgery at Chiang Mai University. One of his first technological discoveries involved manufacturing artificial legs from recycled plastic yogurt bottles. Jivacate used his own funds to simplify and adapt the process and the devices to meet local needs—for instance, designing artificial legs specifically for use by farmers working in wet fields.

== Prostheses Foundation ==
On August 17, 1992 under sponsorship from the Princess Mother Srinagarindra he founded the Prostheses Foundation headquartered in Chiang Mai becoming its secretary-general. With further support from private donors, the royal family, and the Thai national lottery fund, the organization's activities were expanded. The Prostheses Foundation has manufactured artificial legs for more than 15,000 people, for free.

== Innovations ==
After observing that amputees living in the remote borderlands of Thailand were among the least likely to obtain proper prosthetic limbs, Jivacate formed field clinics—that is, organized teams of specialized personnel and volunteers who manufacture prosthetic limbs in mobile workshops. The process is completed within six days; every day 150 to 300 people acquire new prosthetic limbs. Since 1992, Jivacate has organized nearly 100 mobile workshop missions including missions in Laos, Malaysia and Myanmar, the workshops of some of which eventually became permanent satellite ones. These workshops are equipped, and their technicians (many of whom are also amputees) are trained, by the Prostheses Foundation. These activities have also been expanded in Aceh, Indonesia. As of 2010, the mobile units have provided service to about fourteen thousand patients, made seventeen thousand new prosthetic legs, and repaired two thousand artificial legs.

In 2009, Jivacate used a modified version of the Centre for Rehabilitation casting system to fabricate a prosthetic leg for Baby Mosha, a female elephant whose leg had been amputated after she had stepped on a landmine in 2006, when she was 7 months old. The process was featured in a documentary film titled The Eyes of Thailand directed by Windy Borman.

== Awards ==
In 1993, one year after the establishment of the Prostheses Foundation, Dr Jivacate won the Thararom Quality Award for creative inventions from discarded materials, and was voted best rural doctor by the National Medical Association of Thailand. In 1994, the National Research Council of Thailand awarded him the third prize for the most useful medical invention. On August 31, 2008 he was awarded the Ramon Magsaysay Award for Public Service by the Rockefeller Brothers Fund as a recognition of his work on developing artificial limbs available even for poor people.
