= Watchara Kasinrerk =

Thai scientist

Watchara Kasinrerk (Thai: วัชระ กสิณฤกษ์, RTGS: Watchara Kasinroek) is a Thai scientist in the field of immunology. He is a professor at Chiang Mai University's Faculty of Allied Medical Sciences, where he heads the Bio-Medical Science Research Center in partnership with BIOTEC. His work, which mainly focuses on synthesis and applications of monoclonal antibodies, earned him the Outstanding Scientist Award from the Foundation for the Promotion of Science and Technology in 2008 and Outstanding Person Award from the National Identity Commission in 2009.
