= Thongchat Hongladarom =

Thongchat Hongladarom (born 1937) is Chairman of the Board and Independent Director of Samart Corporation PCL.

== Life ==
Thongchat Hongladarom received a Bachelor of Engineering in Civil Engineering from Chulalongkorn University, Thailand and a Master of Engineering in Civil Engineering from Asian Institute of Technology, Thailand. He graduated as Ph.D. in Civil Engineering at Northwestern University in Illinois, United States.

He is Chairman of the Board and Independent Director of Samart Corporation PCL since 13 March 2008 and also Chairman of its Nominating and Remuneration Committees and a member of the Audit Committee. He also serves on the boards of several companies, including Thai Industrial Gas PCL as Chairman of the Board and Sahaviriya Steel Industry PCL. He is Advisor to PTT Chemical PCL, whose first governor he was, when it was still a state enterprise.
