= Luang Phinphakphitthayaphet =

Thai radiologist

Pin Muangman (Thai: พิณ เมืองแมน, RTGS: Phin Mueangmaen; 1900–1977), known by his noble title as Luang Phinphakphitthayaphet (หลวงพิณพากย์พิทยาเภท), was a Thai radiologist who introduced the field to the country. He graduated in medicine from Jefferson Medical College and trained in radiology at Harvard's Peter Bent Brigham Hospital. In 1928, he brought the first X-ray machine into the country, and established the practice at Siriraj Hospital, where he headed the radiology department. He later served as director of the hospital and the dean of its Faculty of Medicine, President of the University of Medical Sciences, and Permanent Secretary of the Ministry of Public Health.
