= Prasop Ratanakorn =

Thai neurologist and psychologist

Prasop Ratanakorn (Thai: ประสพ รัตนากร, RTGS: Prasop Rattanakon; 24 April 1920 – 5 June 2012) was a Thai neurologist and psychologist. The first Thai doctor to complete specialization in the fields, he pioneered the field of neurology in Thailand. He founded the Prasat Neurological Institute and several neurological hospitals in the provinces, and also taught at Mahidol University. He was also known for his role in hosting the educational radio programme Chai Khao Chai Rao, which ran for over 60 years.
