= Kesree Narongdej =

Thai accountant and academic

Kesree Narongdej (Thai: เกษรี ณรงค์เดช, RTGS: Ketsari Narongdet; c. 1935 – 17 April 2017) was a Thai accountant and academic. She was a professor at the Thammasat Business School, and also served as its dean. She was instrumental in the institutionalization of the accounting profession in Thailand and establishing professional accounting standards. She was president of the Institute of Certified Accountants and Auditors of Thailand, and oversaw the transition to the Federation of Accounting Professions, which was established in 2004 in accordance with the Accounting Professions Act B.E. 2547. She served as the president of the federation until 2011.
