= Royal Society of Thailand =

National government academy of Thailand

Royal Society
- ราชบัณฑิตยสภา
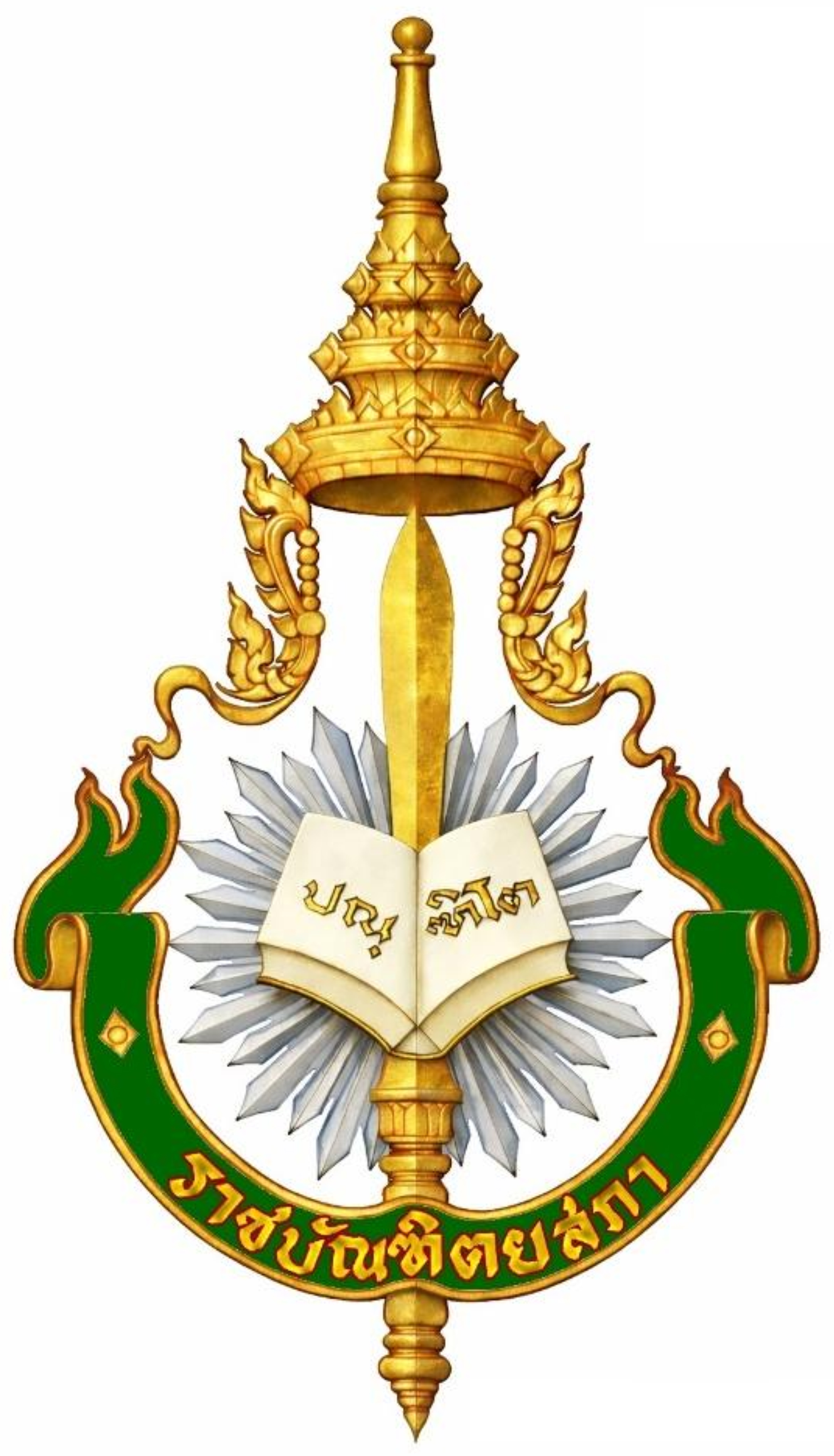

Agency overview
- Preceding agencies: Royal Society (1926–1934); Royal Institute (1934–2015)
- Type: Government agency
- Jurisdiction: Nationwide
- Headquarters: Building C, Chaeng Watthana Government Complex
- Annual budget: ฿97,687,400 (FY2025)
- Agency executive: Prof Surapol Issaragrisil, President
- Key document: Royal Society Act, 2558 BE
- Website: www.orst.go.th

The Royal Society (Note: Thai: ราชบัณฑิตยสภา; RTGS: Ratchabandittayasapha; Thai pronunciation: [râːt.tɕʰā(ʔ).bān.dìt.tā.já(ʔ).sā.pʰāː]) is the national academy of Thailand responsible for academic works of the Thai government.

The secretariat of the society is the Office of the Royal Society, (Note: Thai: สำนักงานราชบัณฑิตยสภา; Thai pronunciation: [sǎm.nák.ŋāːn.râːt.tɕʰā(ʔ).bān.dìt.tā.já(ʔ).sā.pʰāː]; RTGS: Samnakngan Ratchabandittayasapha) formerly known as the Royal Institute. (Note: Thai: ราชบัณฑิตยสถาน; Thai pronunciation: [râːt.tɕʰā(ʔ).bān.dìt.tā.já(ʔ).sā.tʰǎːn]; RTGS: Ratchabandittayasathan) The office is an independent agency of the executive branch of the Thai government and has the status of department under the supervision of the prime minister of Thailand.

Members of the society consist of associate fellows, fellows, and honorary fellows. The associate fellows are academicians selected and appointed by the society. The fellows are associate fellows selected by the society and appointed by the monarchy of Thailand upon advice of the prime minister. The honorary fellows are prominent academicians selected by the society and appointed in the same way as the fellows.

The society is known for its roles in the planning and regulation of the Thai language, as well as its many publications, particularly the Royal Institute Dictionary, the official and prescriptive dictionary of the Thai language, and the Royal Thai General System of Transcription, the official system for romanization of Thai.

== History ==
=== Founded as Royal Society ===
The Royal Society was established on 19 April 1926 by King Prajadhipok by combining the various existing agencies in charge of national libraries, national museums, literature works, engineering works, historical sites, and historical objects into one and the same agency for the reason that "Siam should have a learned society as in Western countries".

The king named the society in Thai as Ratchabandittayasapha (literally, "Sabhā of Royal Pandits") after Krom Ratchabandit (literally, "Department of Royal Pandits"), an ancient government department in the Ministry of Public Instruction.

=== Reorgnised into Royal Institute ===
After the Siamese revolution of 1932, the People's Party which carried out the revolution reorganised the Royal Society at the initiative of one of its members, Pridi Banomyong, by dissolving the Royal Society and splitting the works of the dissolved society into two new agencies, the Royal Institute and the Fine Arts Department, on 31 March 1934.

The reasons for the reorganisation were stated by Luang Wichitwathakan, the first secretary general of the Royal Institute, as follows: "Our Royal Society had been in place since 2469 BE but it had not been structured to be what it should be. Instead of making the Royal Society a place for academic works like the present Royal Institute, the members of the Royal Society were loaded with administrative works, causing them to waste most of their time doing administrative works and have a little time for doing academic works. In addition, there had been no law or any other regulation requiring members of the Royal Society to do academic works."

The reorganisation was designed after the Institut de France, dividing the Royal Institute into three academies: the Academy of Moral and Political Sciences, the Academy of Sciences, and the Academy of Arts, which structure has been retained until the present.

The Royal Institute was first convened on 16 June 1934, presided over by Phraya Phahonphonphayuhasena, the then prime minister of Siam who addressed the convention as follows: "Our Royal Institute is not a tool or device for promoting the dignity of any particular person, but it shall be for honouring the Nation and the constitutional administration. If there should be a name that should stay together with the Royal Institute, that shall not be the name of a person, but the name of the House of Representatives, the name of the Constitution. If there should be anything that people of later generation should think of together with the Royal Institute, that shall be the Constitution." At this convention, Prince Wan Waithayakon, Phra Riamwiratchaphak, and Luang Wichitwathakan were elected as the first president, vice president, and secretary general of the institute, respectively.

The prominent works of the institute in the initial period include the revision of the official dictionary of Thai words, a work transferred from the Ministry of Public Instruction, as well as the production of Thai encyclopedias and gazetteers, the coinage of academic terms, and the creation of rules for romanisation of Thai.

=== Renamed back to Royal Society ===
In 2013, the Council of the Royal Institute found it appropriate to honour King Prajadhipok on the occasion of the 120th anniversary of his birthday in 2015, by renaming the Royal Institute back to the Royal Society. To that effect, a law was introduced to and passed by the military-appointed National Legislative Assembly, which became the Royal Society Act, 2558 BE, effective on and from 14 February 2015. In addition to the renaming, the act turned the Council of the Royal Institute into the Royal Society itself and turned the Royal Institute into the secretariat of the society, called Office of the Royal Society. The act also increased the powers of the society, such as by authorising it to confer degrees and certificates, to establish a welfare fund for its members, and to retain income for its internal use without having to send the income to the finance ministry as national revenue.

Many members of the society objected to the renaming because of lack of public hearing on the matter.

== Headquarters ==
The society was first located at Bang Khun Phrom Palace and later moved to the Vajiravudh Library on Na Phra That Road until 1988, when it moved to Ratchawanlop Building within the Grand Palace. In 2006, the society moved to Sanam Sueapa near the Royal Plaza. In 2024, the society moved again to its present headquarters within Building C of the Chaeng Watthana Government Complex.

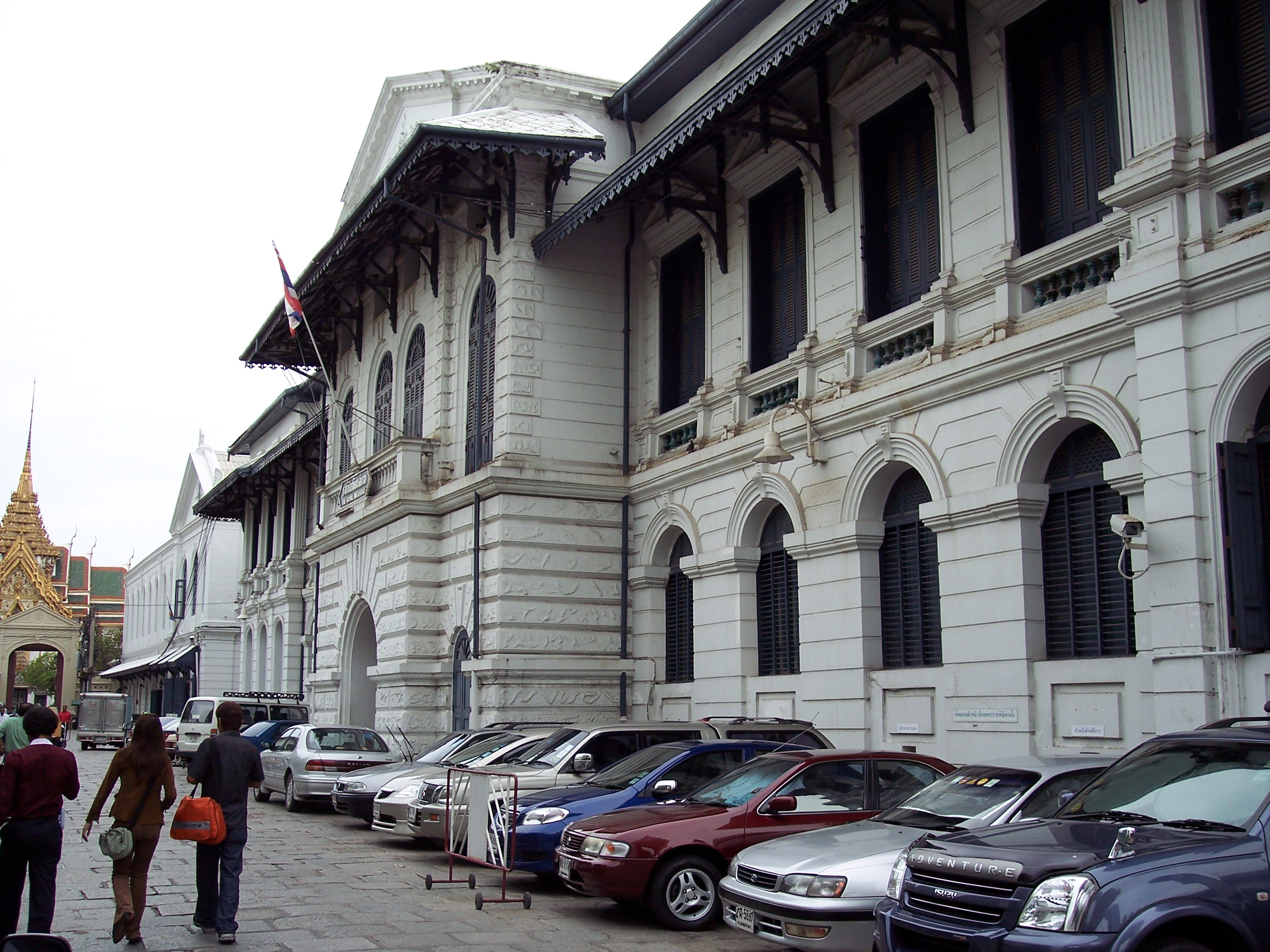
Headquarters of the Royal Society within the Grand Palace, Bangkok

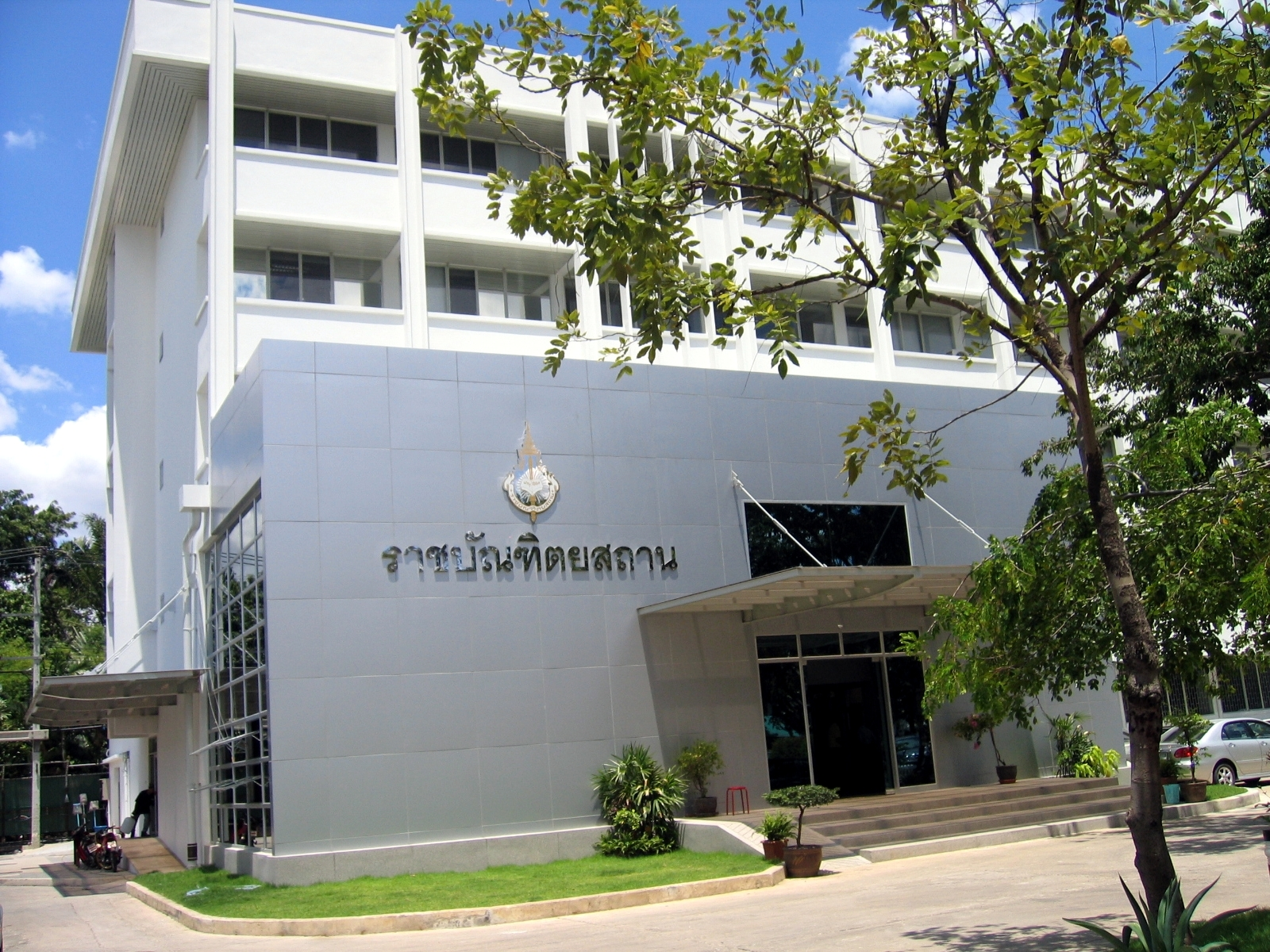
Headquarters of the Royal Society at Sanam Sueapa, Bangkok

== Administration ==
For administrative purposes, the society has four divisions:

Secretariat General
Moral and Political Sciences Division
Science Division
Arts Division

The society's website states that each division has a staff of civil servants and clerical employees who perform both business and academic functions facilitating the works of fellows and associate fellows as well as conducting and promoting various academic activities.

== Members ==
Scholars from the academic community of Thailand can apply for memberships in the society. Acceptance is based on applicants' contributions and published works. The levels of memberships in the society are:

1. Honorary fellows
2. Fellows
3. Associate fellows

Of these, only the associate fellow titles can be applied for. Fellows are appointed by the monarch, chosen from amongst the existing associate fellows. Honorary fellows are likewise appointed by the monarch and are chosen from among scholars who are not already fellows of the society. These three groups can be collectively referred to as the members of the society.

== Academies ==
Members of the society are divided into three academies. Each academy is subdivided into branches, and each branch includes several specific fields, totalling to 137 different academic disciplines.

=== Academy of Moral and Political Sciences ===
- Philosophy
  - Metaphysics and epistemology
  - Axiology
  - Logic
  - Theology
- Social science
  - Jurisprudence
  - Political science and public administration
  - Sociology and anthropology
  - Psychology
  - Social work and social welfare
  - Economics
  - Business administration
  - Geography
  - Education
  - Communication sciences
- History
  - World history
  - Thai history
  - Archaeology

=== Academy of Science ===
- Engineering
  - Chemical engineering and technology
  - Biochemical engineering and technology
  - Petrochemical engineering and technology
  - Civil engineering
  - Irrigation engineering
  - Water resources engineering
  - Electrical engineering
  - Electronic engineering
  - Telecommunications engineering
  - Mechanical engineering
  - Manufacturing systems engineering
  - Agricultural engineering
  - Biological engineering
  - Aerospace engineering
  - Marine engineering
  - Systems engineering
  - Mining engineering
  - Naval engineering
- Technology
  - Biotechnology
  - Energy technology
  - Environmental technology
  - Communications technology
  - Information technology
  - Materials technology
  - Polymer technology
  - Management technology
  - Nanotechnology
  - Thermal technology
  - Technology for the built environment
- Natural science
  - Botany
  - Zoology and animal science
  - Genetics
  - Chemistry
  - Physics and astronomy
  - Mathematics and statistics
  - Computer science
  - Earth system and environmental science (geology/oceanography)
  - Biochemistry
  - Microbiology
  - Molecular biology
- Agricultural science and technology and veterinary medicine
  - Pedology
  - Plant science
  - Natural resources
  - Entomology
  - Food science and technology
  - Agricultural biotechnology
  - Animal husbandry
  - Fishery
  - Forestry
  - Veterinary medicine
- Medicine and dentistry
  - Obstetrics-gynecology
  - Surgery
  - Orthopedic surgery
  - Anesthesiology
  - Internal medicine
  - Dermatology
  - Cardiovascular system
  - Tropical medicine
  - Pediatrics
  - Otorhinolaryngology
  - Ophthalmology
  - Psychiatry
  - Laboratory medicine
  - Rehabilitation medicine
  - Medical education
  - Transfusion medicine
  - Family medicine
  - Preventive and social medicine
  - Community medicine
  - Dentistry
- Health sciences
  - Medical biochemistry
  - Forensic medicine
  - Parasitology
  - Pharmacology
  - Immunology
  - Physiology
  - Toxicology
  - Anatomy
  - Pharmaceutical sciences
  - Medical technology
  - Pathology
  - Radiology
  - Physical therapy
  - Nursing science
  - Public health
  - Epidemiology
  - Nutritional science

=== Academy of Arts ===
- Arts of literature
  - Classical language
  - Linguistics
  - Ancient letters
  - Folk literature
  - Prose
  - Poetry
  - Comparative literature
  - Thai Language
  - Tai languages
  - Eastern foreign languages and literature
  - Western foreign languages and literature
  - Translation and interpretation
- Architectural arts
  - Architecture
  - Thai architecture
  - Vernacular architecture
  - City planning
  - Urban design
  - Interior architecture
  - Landscape architecture
  - Naval architecture
  - History of architecture
- Fine arts
  - Painting
  - Sculpture
  - Printmaking
  - Photography
  - Thai art
  - Drama
  - Thai classical drama
  - Music
  - Thai classical music
- Applied arts
  - Interior design
  - Industrial design
  - Miniature art

== Logo ==
The official logo of the society is a shining sword behind an open book bearing a Pali word, paṇḍito ("pandit"). A crown floats upon the sword and a ribbon bearing the name of the society is below the book.

The sword and the book is based upon a saying, "wisdom is on a par with weapon" (Thai: ปัญญาประดุจดังอาวุธ). The light of the sword represents the light of wisdom. The crown represents the monarch.

== Works ==
=== Royal Institute Dictionary ===
Perhaps the most well-known work of the society is the prescriptive Royal Institute Dictionary.

The society has published four fully revised editions of the dictionary, and many intermittent reprintings with minor revisions. Each of the major revisions is associated with a significant year in Thai history, although in the case of the 1999 and 2011 editions, the actual publication date is a later year.

=== Spelling guidelines ===
The society also publishes guidelines for spelling of loanwords in Thai. A proposed change in 2012 met public criticism as Thai words borrowed from English were generally spelt without tone marks and the change would add tone marks to them. Professor Kanchana Naksakul, senior fellow of the society who proposed the change, believed that the change would better reflect the actual pronunciation of the words and would assist foreigners in learning Thai. Despite the support of around 300 survey respondents who were from linguistic circles and the support of the Thai education ministry and higher education lecturers, the change was voted against by the Council of the Royal Society on 17 December 2012.

=== Royal Thai General System of Transcription ===
The society publishes the Royal Thai General System of Transcription, the official way of romanisation of Thai.
