= Surapol Issaragrisil =

Thai medical professor (born 1950)

Surapol Issaragrisil MD, FRCP, FACP, FRCPA, FRCPath
- สุรพล อิสรไกรศีล

Division of Hematology, Department of Medicine, Faculty of Medicine Siriraj Hospital, Mahidol University, Bangkok, Thailand

President of the Royal Society (Thailand)
- In office 12 April 2019 – 11 April 2021
- Preceded by: Sobha Chupikulchai Spielmann
- Succeeded by: Suraphon Wiroonrak

President of the Royal Society (Thailand)
- In office 12 April 2023 – Present
- Preceded by: Suraphon Wiroonrak

Personal details
- Born: July 18, 1950 (age 76) Damnoen Saduak, Ratchaburi, Thailand
- Spouse: Rattana Issaragrisil
- Children: 3
- Education: Mahidol University (MD)
- Profession: Medical Doctor; Academic

Surapol Issaragrisil (Thai: สุรพล อิสรไกรศีล, RTGS: Suraphon Itsarakraisin; born 18 July 1950) is medical doctor and professor of medicine at Division of Hematology, Department of Medicine, Faculty of Medicine Siriraj Hospital, Mahidol University. He is an expert at hematology, bone marrow transplantation, and blood stem cells transplantation.

== Early life and education ==
Surapol was born in Damnoen Saduak District, Ratchaburi Province, Thailand. He studied his secondary education from Metreechunhawanvittayalai School at Bang Khonthi District, Samut Songkram Province, and then pursued his high school at Trium Udom Suksa school in Bangkok before having his bachelor's degree at medicine, Faculty of Medicine Siriraj Hospital in 1974. Later, he continued to study in order to have his Certified Board at Internal Medicine in 1978, add his research fellow from Department of Clinical Physiology at University of Ulm in Germany in 1982, take his Certified Board at Hematology in 1984 and get his clinical fellow, Fred Hutchinson Cancer Research Center, University of Washington, Seattle, US, in 1985.

== Position ==
- Professor of Medicine, Division of Hematology, Department of Medicine, Faculty of Medicine Siriraj Hospital, Mahidol University, Bangkok, Thailand
- Director, Siriraj Center of Excellence for Stem Cell Research (SiSCR)
- President of the Royal Society (Thailand)
- President of the Thai Society for Stem Cell Research
- Board Member, Union Académique Internationale
- Chief Faculty, BDMS Center of Excellence Hematology

== Membership and fellowship ==
- Fellow, Royal College of Physicians (London), FRCP
- Fellow, American College of Physicians, FACP
- Fellow, Royal College of Pathologists of Australasia, FRCPA
- Fellow, Royal College of Pathologists (UK), FRCPath
- Member, American Society of Hematology
- Member, Thai Society of Hematology
- Member, Society for Experimental Hematology
- Member, American Association for Advancement of Science
- Member, International Society of Hematology
- Member, International Society for Hematotherapy and Graft Engineering
- Member, British Society of Hematology
- Member, Asian Conferences on Modern Therapy in Hematology
- Member, International Society for Stem Cell Research
- Member, Asia-Pacific Bone Marrow Transplantation Group

== Decorations ==
- Knight Grand Cordon (Special Class) of the Order of the White Elephant (2000)
- Knight Grand Cordon (Special Class) of the Order of the Crown of Thailand (1997)
- Dushdi Mala Medal for Innovation in Medicine (2008)

== Honors and awards ==
- Siriraj Outstanding Personnel Award 1996, 1998, 1999, 2001, 2002, 2008, 2009, 2015
- Siriraj Award Honoring 2018
- A.G. ELLIS RESEARCH AWARD (Research award 2016) Pre-clinic 13 June 13, 2016
- Quality Person of the Year 2012 in Medicine, 2012
- Establishing the Annual Congress on Update in Breakthroughs in Hematology (AUBH), 2011
- National Outstanding Person in Science and Technology, 2011
- Dushdi Mala Medal for Innovation in Medicine, 2008
- Mahidol University Award for Outstanding Research, 2008
- Senior Research Scholar of Thailand Research Fund, 2005
- Organizing the Humboldt Kolleg, “The Role of Science to Improve Quality of Life in Postgenomic Era”, 2003
- President of Asia Pacific Bone Marrow Transplant Group, 2000
- Organizing the 6th Congress of Asia-Pacific Bone Marrow Transplantation, 2000
- The National Heart, Lung, and Blood Institute Award for Outstanding Commitment and Dedication in Promoting Joint Research in US-Thailand Collaboration on Aplastic Anemia, 1998
- National Best Research Award from National Research Council, 1993, 1995
- Mahidol University-B-Braun Prize for Medical Research, 1993
