= Charng Ratanarat =

Thai businessman

Charng Ratanarat (Thai: จ่าง รัตนะรัต; 1904–1993) was a Thai chemist, government official and entrepreneur.

Charng was born in Nakhon Si Thammarat province, when he grew up, he went to secondary school at Suankularb Wittayalai School in Bangkok. His first job was as a teacher. Later, he received a scholarship to study for a doctorate in science at the University of Jena.

He was the first to develop iron smelting techniques in Thailand, for the Siam Cement Company, where he served on the board of directors. He served as the Director-general of the Department of Science under the Ministry of Industry from 1944 to 1963, and as Permanent Secretary of Industry after that. He made multiple business ventures, the most significant of which is the Siam Chemicals Company, which grew from a capital of 12 million baht in 1959 to be worth over one billion by the 1990s.
