= Medical Council of Thailand =

The Medical Council of Thailand (Thai: แพทยสภา) is the country's professional regulatory body for the medical profession. It operates under the provisions of the Medical Profession Act, B.E. 2525 (1982 CE), which replaced a series of earlier legislation dating to the council's foundation in 1923. Under the law, the council is tasked with: upholding the profession's ethics; supporting medical education, research, and practice; uniting and upholding the dignity of its members; aiding and educating the general population and organizations on relevant matters; advising the government on medical and public health issues; and representing the medical profession in Thailand. The council is responsible for granting and revoking licences to practice medicine, as well as certification of medical education programmes and degrees. All licensed doctors are members of the council, and are entitled to elect members of its governing body, the Medical Council Committee, and its head, the President of the Medical Council, on a biennial basis.

== See also ==
- List of medical schools in Thailand
