= Gnathostoma turgidum =

Scientific classification
- Kingdom: Animalia
- Phylum: Nematoda
- Class: Chromadorea
- Order: Rhabditida
- Family: Gnathostomatidae
- Genus: Gnathostoma
- Species: G. turgidum

Binomial name
- Gnathostoma turgidum Stossich, 1902

Synonyms
- Synonymy: Gnathostoma brasiliense Ruiz; Gnathostoma didelphis Chandler; Gnathostoma oligomucronatum Almeyda-Artiga

Species of roundworm

Gnathostoma turgidum is a nematode that is a parasite of raccoons in the United States.

== Description ==
Gnathostoma turgidum is a large nematode. It has eight complete and two incomplete transverse rows of hooks on the head end, surrounding one pair of protruding unilobed lips. There are two papillae (small bumps) on each lip, with one amphid (small sensory depression) between each pair of papillae. Cervical papillae occur at about one-quarter of the length of the body from the head. The front half of the body is covered in spines, varying in size and shape depending on sex and region of the body. Males are about 40 mm long and 1.7 mm wide. The spicules (male mating structures) are blunt and unequal, with the left spicule about twice as long as the right. Females are about 67 mm long and 2.1 mm wide. The eggs have two polar caps and have many pits on the surface. The type host was the big-eared opossum (Procyon aurita), and the type locality was Buenos Aires, Argentina. It has been reported from Argentina, Brazil, Panama, Peru, and the United States. The typical location of infection in the primary host is the stomach. G. turgidum resembles, but can be distinguished from, Gnathostoma lamothei, which is found in Mexico.

== Life history ==
Gnathostoma turgidum has a multi-host life history, as do all species of Gnathostoma. The eggs hatch in fresh water and the larvae are eaten by copepods. The copepods are in turn eaten by second intermediate hosts (fish and amphibians), which may be consumed in turn by paratenic or transport hosts (reptiles and birds). Eventually, the larvae end up in the stomachs of the primary hosts, where the larvae embed in the stomach wall and develop into adults, and release eggs into the digestive tract. Embryos develop in eggs which reach fresh water.
