= Gnathostoma binucleatum =

Scientific classification
- Kingdom: Animalia
- Phylum: Nematoda
- Class: Chromadorea
- Order: Rhabditida
- Family: Gnathostomatidae
- Genus: Gnathostoma
- Species: G. binucleatum

Binomial name
- Gnathostoma binucleatum Almeyda-Artigas, 1991

Species of roundworm

Gnathostoma binucleatum is a nematode that is a parasite of canids and felids in the Americas.

== Description ==
Gnathostoma binucleatum is a medium-sized nematode. It has eight to ten transverse rows of hooks on the head end, surrounding one pair of trilobed lips, with the central lobe smaller than the flanking lobes. Cervical papillae (small bumps) occur at about one-quarter of the length of the body from the head (16 to 20 rows of spines). All of the body is covered by spines. The spines from just behind the head to the cervical papillae are short and broad, and have one to three points, with the Central point growing longer from front to rear. Spines in the mid-esophogeal region are long and slender, with one to two points, decreasing to one point towards the rear. Beyond there spines gradually become smaller and more widely spced towards the caudal end. The spicules (male mating structures) are blunt and unequal, with the left spicule much longer than the right. The eggs have one polar cap. The type host was an Ocelot (Leopardus pardalis), and the type locality was Temascal, Oaxaca, Mexico. G. binucleatum has also been reported to occur in Ecuador. The typical location of infection in the primary host is the stomach.

Gnathostoma binucleatum has been confused with the Asiatic species Gnathostoma spinigerum because of similarities in the shapes of hooks and spines, the eggs being unipolar, and both species having canids and felids as primary hosts. The species differ in that G. binucleatum has a maximum of three points on spines and just one point on spines in the mid-region, while G. spinigerum has a maximum of four to five points on spines and always has three points on spines in the mid-region. Eggshells of G. binucleatum are smooth while those of G. spinigerum have many small pits.

== Life history ==
Gnathostoma binucleatum has a multi-host life history, as do all species of Gnathostoma. The eggs hatch in fresh water and the larvae are eaten by copepods. The copepods are in turn eaten by second intermediate hosts (fish and amphibians), which may be consumed in turn by paratenic or transport hosts (reptiles and birds). Eventually, the larvae end up in the stomachs of the primary hosts, where the larvae embed in the stomach wall and develop into adults, and release eggs into the digestive tract. Embryos develop in eggs which reach fresh water.

Advanced third-stage larvae of Gnathostoma binucleatum have been found in three species of fish caught in Tabasco, Mexico that are consumed by humans, Gobiomorus dormitor, Petenia splendida, and Parachromis managuensis.

== Human infection ==
Ingestion of third-stage larvae of Gnathostoma binucleatum is the only known cause of gnathostomiasis in the Americas. Although gnathostomiasis resembles other parasitic infections, as of 2012, 9,000 documented cases had been identified in Mexico, usually by recovery of third-stage larvae from victims. In the Americas, gnathostomiasis is acquired by eating raw or under-cooked fresh-water fish that are intermediate hosts of the third-stage larvae.
