= Gnathostoma sociale =

Scientific classification
- Kingdom: Animalia
- Phylum: Nematoda
- Class: Chromadorea
- Order: Rhabditida
- Family: Gnathostomatidae
- Genus: Gnathostoma
- Species: G. sociale

Binomial name
- Gnathostoma sociale (Leidy, 1858)

Synonyms
- Cheiracanthus socialis Leidy, 1858

Species of roundworm

Gnathostoma sociale is a nematode that is a parasite of mustelids in the United States.

== Description ==
Gnathostoma sociale is a medium-sized nematode. It has nine to ten complete and one incomplete transverse rows of hooks on the head end, surrounding one pair of protruding unilobed lips. There are two papillae (small bumps) on each lip, with one amphid (small sensory depression) between each pair of papillae. Cervical papillae occur at about one-quarter of the length of the body from the head. The front half of the body is covered in spines, with the size and shape depending on the region of the body and sex of the worm. Males are about 22 mm long and 1.3 mm wide. The spicules (male mating structures) are blunt and unequal, with the right spicule almost twice as long as the left. Females are about 31 mm long and just over 2 mm wide. The eggs have one polar cap and have many pits on the surface. The type host was the American mink (Mustela vison), and the type locality is presumed to have been Pennsylvania, United States. It has been reported from the United States. The typical location of infection in the primary host is the stomach wall.

== Life history ==
Gnathostoma sociale has a multi-host life history, as do all species of Gnathostoma. The eggs hatch in fresh water and the larvae are eaten by copepods. The copepods are in turn eaten by second intermediate hosts (fish and amphibians), which may be consumed in turn by paratenic or transport hosts (reptiles and birds). Eventually, the larvae end up in the stomach lining of a primary host, where the larvae develop into adults, and release eggs into the alimentary tract. Embryos develop in eggs which reach fresh water.

== Taxonomic history ==
Described as Cheiracanthus socialis in 1856, the name of the species was later moved to Gnathostoma socialis and then corrected to Gnathostoma sociale. G. sociale was synonymized to G. spinigerum, a species otherwise known only from Asia and Oceania, in 1920. Bertoni-Ruiz et al. re-established G. sociale as a valid species in 2011. In particular, G. sociale has no spines on the rear half of the body, which G. spinigerum has.
