= Gnathostoma miyazakii =

Scientific classification
- Kingdom: Animalia
- Phylum: Nematoda
- Class: Chromadorea
- Order: Rhabditida
- Family: Gnathostomatidae
- Genus: Gnathostoma
- Species: G. miyazakii

Binomial name
- Gnathostoma miyazakii Anderson, 1964

Species of roundworm

Gnathostoma miyazakii is a nematode that is a parasite of otters in Canada and the United States.

== Description ==
Gnathostoma miyazakii is a medium-sized nematode with a narrow body. It has ten complete and one or two incomplete transverse rows of hooks on the head end, surrounding one pair of protruding unilobed lips. There are two papillae (small bumps) on each lip, with one amphid (small sensory depression) between each pair of papillae. Cervical papillae occur at about one-quarter of the length of the body from the head. The whole body is covered in spines, varying in size and shape depending on sex and region of the body. Spines towards the head end are well defined, while spines towards the tail end are scale-like. Males are about 49 mm long and just over 0.8 mm wide. The spicules (male mating structures) are blunt and unequal, with the left spicule about three-quarters as long as the right. Females are about 39 mm long and just over 0.8 mm wide. The eggs have two polar caps and have many pits on the surface. The type host was the North American river otter (Lutra canadensis), and the type locality was Black trout lake, Township 30, Range 22, Ontario, Canada. It has been reported from Canada and the United States. The typical location of infection in the primary host is the fibrous tissue of the kidneys.

== Life history ==
Gnathostoma miyazakii has a multi-host life history, as do all species of Gnathostoma. The eggs hatch in fresh water and the larvae are eaten by copepods. The copepods are in turn eaten by second intermediate hosts (fish and amphibians), which may be consumed in turn by paratenic or transport hosts (reptiles and birds). Eventually, the larvae end up in the kidneys of G. miyazakii, where the larvae develop into adults, and release eggs into the urinary tract. Embryos develop in eggs which reach fresh water.
