= Gnathostoma lamothei =

Scientific classification
- Kingdom: Animalia
- Phylum: Nematoda
- Class: Chromadorea
- Order: Rhabditida
- Family: Gnathostomatidae
- Genus: Gnathostoma
- Species: G. lamothei

Binomial name
- Gnathostoma lamothei Bertoni-Ruiz, García-Prieto, Osorio-Sarabia & León-Règagnon, 2005

Species of roundworm

Gnathostoma lamothei is a nematode that is a parasite of raccoons in Mexico.

== Description ==
Gnathostoma lamothei is a medium-sized nematode. It has eight to nine complete and two incomplete transverse rows of hooks on the head end, surrounding one pair of protruding trilobed lips, with the central lobe larger than the flanking lobes. Cervical papillae occur at about one-quarter of the length of the body from the head. The front half of the body is covered in spines, varying in size and shape depending on the region of the body. Spines become smaller with fewer points from the esophogeal region towards the mid-point, where they disappear. The rear half of the body has rows of roundish bumps between striations in the cuticle. The spicules (male mating structures) are blunt and unequal, with the right spicule more than four times as long as the left. The eggs have one polar cap and have many pits on the surface. The type host was the common raccoon (Procyon lotor), and the type locality was Laguna Herrera, Tlacotalpan, Veracruz, Mexico. It has been reported in the states of Oaxaca and Veracruz in Mexico. The typical location of infection in the primary host is the stomach. G. lamothei resembles G. procyonis, which also has raccoons as its primary host. The species differ in the length of the right spicule and the density of spines on the front half of the body. In addition, G. procyonis has shortened spines on the rear half of the body that fuse in serrated ridges towards the end of the body, compared to the bumps between striations on the rear half of the body of G. lamothei.

== Life history ==
Gnathostoma lamothei has a multi-host life history, as do all species of Gnathostoma. The eggs hatch in fresh water and the larvae are eaten by copepods. The copepods are in turn eaten by second intermediate hosts (fish and amphibians), which may be consumed in turn by paratenic or transport hosts (reptiles and birds). Eventually, the larvae end up in the stomach of G. lamothei, where the larvae develop into adults, and release eggs into the alimentary tract. Embryos develop in eggs which reach fresh water.

Advanced third-stage larvae of Gnathostoma lamothei have been found in an intermediate host, the fish Gobiomorus dormitor, caught in Tabasco, Mexico. The fish is commercially important in Mexico, raising the possibility that G. lamothei may be a cause of gnathostomiasis there.
