= Gnathostoma procyonis =

Scientific classification
- Kingdom: Animalia
- Phylum: Nematoda
- Class: Chromadorea
- Order: Rhabditida
- Family: Gnathostomatidae
- Genus: Gnathostoma
- Species: G. procyonis

Binomial name
- Gnathostoma procyonis Chandler, 1942

Species of roundworm

Gnathostoma procyonis is a nematode that is a parasite of raccoons in the United States.

== Description ==
Gnathostoma procyonis is a medium-sized nematode with the rear half of the body slightly wider than the front half. It has nine complete and one incomplete transverse rows of hooks on the head end, surrounding one pair of protruding trilobed lips, with the central lobe larger than the flanking lobes. There are two papillae (small bumps) on each lip, with one amphid (small sensory depression) between each pair of papillae. Cervical papillae occur at about one-quarter of the length of the body from the head. The front half of the body is covered in well-define spines, while spines towards the tail end are progressively shortened and then fused into serrated ridges. Males are about 18 mm long and 1.3 mm wide. The spicules (male mating structures) are blunt and unequal, with the right spicule a little over three times as long as the left. Females are about 22 mm long and just over 1.4 mm wide. The eggs have one polar cap and have many pits on the surface. The type host was the common raccoon (Procyon lotor), and the type locality was Angelina County, Texas, United States. It has been reported from the United States. The typical location of infection in the primary host is the stomach.

== Life history ==
Gnathostoma procyonis has a multi-host life history, as do all species of Gnathostoma. The eggs hatch in fresh water and the larvae are eaten by copepods. The copepods are in turn eaten by second intermediate hosts (fish and amphibians), which may be consumed in turn by paratenic or transport hosts (reptiles and birds). Eventually, the larvae end up in the stomach lining of G. procyonis, where the larvae develop into adults, and release eggs into the alimentary tract. Embryos develop in eggs which reach fresh water.
