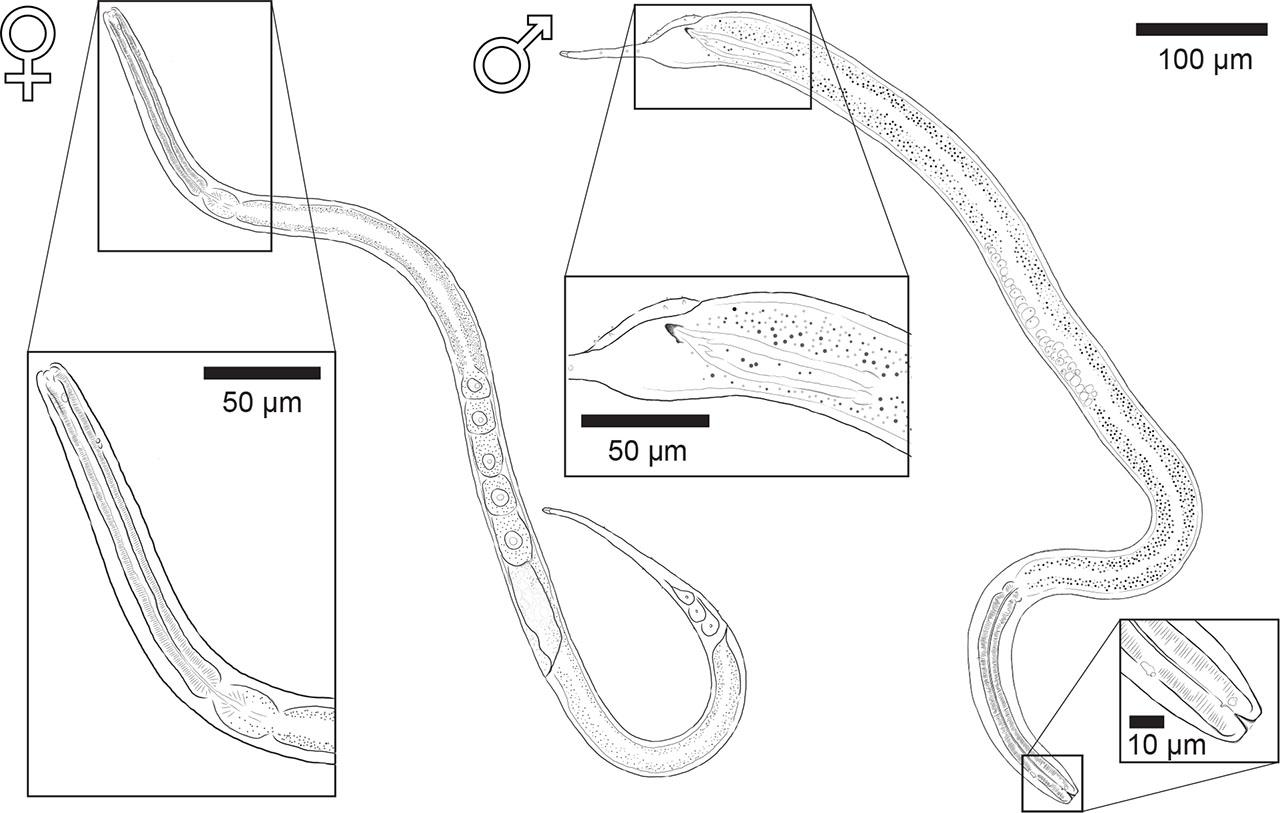
- Illustration of male and female D. woaabi

Scientific classification
- Kingdom: Animalia
- Phylum: Nematoda
- Class: Chromadorea
- Order: Monhysterida
- Family: Monhysteridae
- Genus: Diplolaimelloides
- Species: D. woaabi

Binomial name
- Diplolaimelloides woaabi (Jung, 2025)

= Diplolaimelloides woaabi =

Free-living species of nematode

Diplolaimelloides woaabi is a species of free-living, halophilic nematode within the family Monhysteridae. Described in 2025, it is the first nematode species identified as endemic to the Great Salt Lake in the U.S. state of Utah. As an extremophile, it is one of only three animal taxa known to inhabit the lake's hypersaline waters, alongside brine shrimp (Artemia) and brine flies (Ephydra). The species epithet is derived from "wo'aabi", the Shoshone word for "worm", chosen in consultation with and in honor of the Northwestern Band of the Shoshone Nation.

== Description ==
Diplolaimelloides woaabi is a small, slender roundworm, typically measuring less than 1.5 mm in length. Its body plan is symmetrical and nearly cylindrical, tapering toward the tail. The cuticle is thin and smooth with subtle transverse striae. Distinctive morphological features include the presence of two ocelli (primitive eyespots), a bipartite buccal cavity consisting of a funnel-shaped anterior chamber and a reduced secondary cavity, and circular to cryptospiral amphidial fovea.

The species exhibits sexual dimorphism, particularly in the tail region. Females have a tail that tapers gradually, whereas the male tail narrows abruptly and is characterized by a prominent bursa. Males possess long, slightly curved double spicules with "halberd-like" sub-apical extensions and a funnel-shaped gubernaculum. The male genital papillae are arranged in a specific (2+2) pattern on the bursa, with an additional mid-ventral pre-cloacal papilla.

== Habitat and ecology ==
Diplolaimelloides woaabi is primarily found inhabiting microbialites (lithified mounds formed by microbes) located on the lakebed of the Great Salt Lake. These microbialites serve as a refuge and a concentrated source of bacteria, which the nematodes consume. The species is largely restricted to the top few centimeters of the microbial mats.

D. woaabi is an extremophile that is highly adapted to hypersaline environments; specimens have been recovered from areas of the lake with salinity levels as high as 115 parts per thousand. The discovery of this new species, one of only two non-coastal members of the Diplolaimelloides genus, has led researchers to hypothesize that it is either a relict population isolated since the Cretaceous Period or was introduced to the Great Salt Lake via migratory birds.
