= Gnathostoma americanum =

Scientific classification
- Kingdom: Animalia
- Phylum: Nematoda
- Class: Chromadorea
- Order: Rhabditida
- Family: Gnathostomatidae
- Genus: Gnathostoma
- Species: G. americanum

Binomial name
- Gnathostoma americanum Travaso, 1925

Species of roundworm

Gnathostoma americanum is a nematode that is a parasite of felids in Brazil.

== Description ==
Gnathostoma americanum is a small nematode. It has eight transverse rows of hooks on the head end, surrounding one pair of lips. Cervical papillae (small bumps) occur at about one-quarter of the length of the body from the head. About three-quarters of the body is covered by spines. The spines from just behind the head to the cervical papillae are short and broad, and have five to seven points. Spines beyond the cervical papillae gradually become smaller with fewer points towards the caudal end. The spicules (male mating structures) are thin and unequal, with the left spicule much longer than the right. The eggs have two polar caps. The type host was an Oncilla (Leopardus tigrinus), and the type locality was Angra dos Reis, Rio de Janeiro, Brazil. The typical location of infection in the primary host is the stomach.

== Life history ==
Gnathostoma americanum has a multi-host life history, as do all species of Gnathostoma. The eggs hatch in fresh water and the larvae are eaten by copepods. The copepods are in turn eaten by second intermediate hosts (fish and amphibians), which may be consumed in turn by paratenic or transport hosts (reptiles and birds). Eventually, the larvae end up in the stomachs of the primary hosts, where the larvae embed in the stomach wall and develop into adults, and release eggs into the digestive tract. Embryos develop in eggs which reach fresh water.
