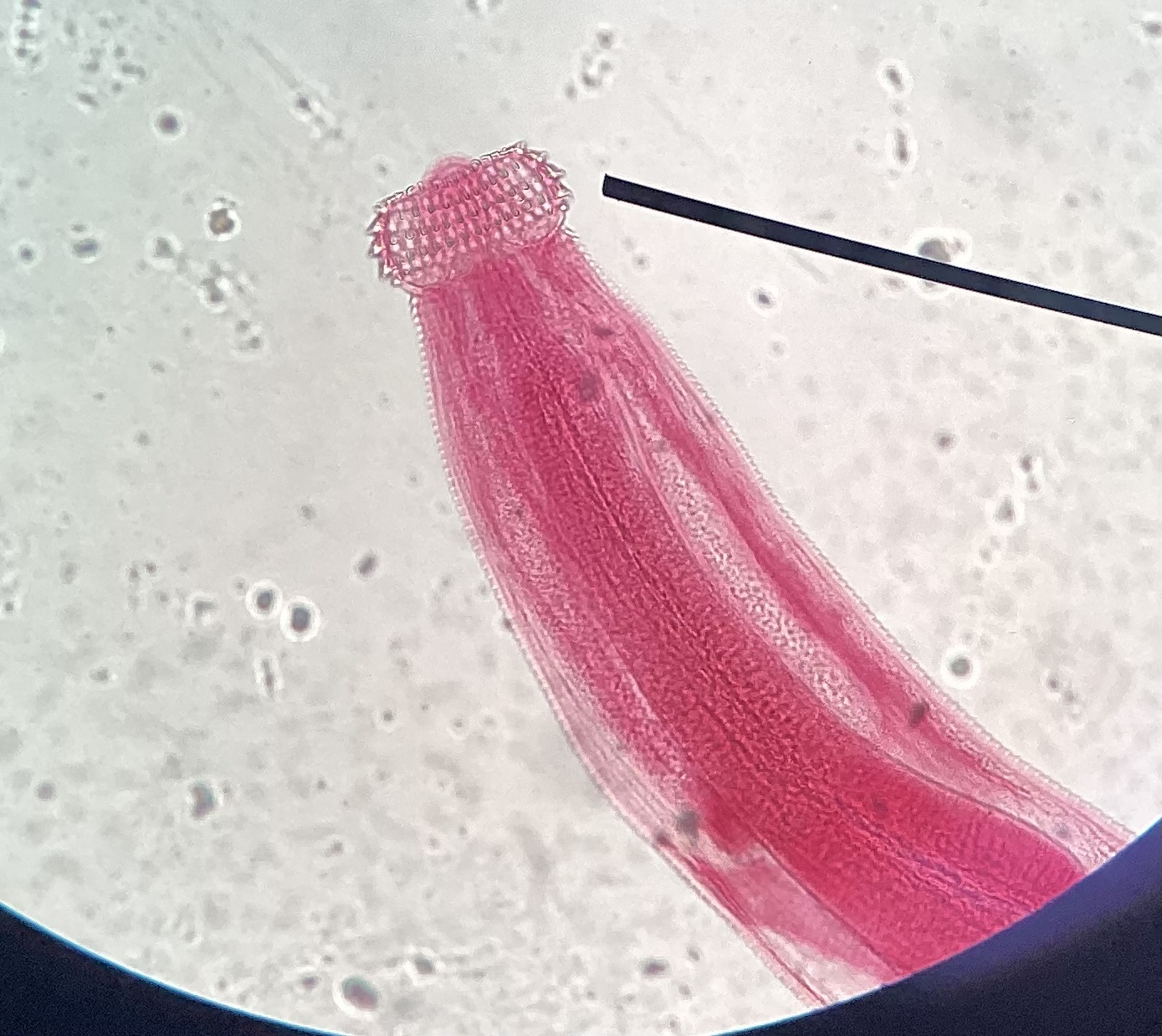

Scientific classification
- Kingdom: Animalia
- Phylum: Nematoda
- Class: Chromadorea
- Order: Rhabditida
- Family: Gnathostomatidae
- Genus: Gnathostoma; Owen, 1837

= Gnathostoma =

Genus of roundworms

Gnathostoma is a genus of parasitic nematodes with multi-host life-cycles. Successive hosts include copepods, fish and amphibians, and carnivorous and omnivorous mammals. Infection with nematodes of some Gnathostoma species causes gnathostomiasis in humans.

== Morphology ==
Nematodes of the genus Gnathostoma are characterized by a cephalic bulb, the head, which is covered by spines (often called hooks). The cephalic bulb is separated from the rest of the body by a constriction, the neck. There is a round oral cavity, or mouth, enclosed by two pseudolips. There are four cervical sacs inside the neck. (Richard Owen described long straight tubes equally spaced around the gastrointestinal tract and opening only into the mouth, calling them a "salivary apparatus".)

The structure of the pseudolips and the structure and distribution of spines over the body are reliable identifiers for distinguishing species of Gnathostoma, but detection requires examination under a scanning electron microscope. Species of Gnathostoma are also distinguished by the primary host parasitized by the species (generally a family of carnivorous or omnivorous mammals), the location parasitized inside the host's body, the size of the worm's body, the shape and distribution of spines on the cuticle, the presence of bulges or caps on one or both of the polar ends of the eggs, the morphology of the eggshell, and the shape of the caudal bursa on the tail of the worm.

== Species ==
As of 2026, nine species are accepted in Nemys, the World Database of Nematodes.

Species accepted in Nemys	Distribution	Primary host
Gnathostoma americanum Travassos, 1925	South America	felids
Gnathostoma binucleatum Almeyda-Artigas, 1991	Mexico	canids, felids
Gnathostoma hispidum Fedtschenko, 1872	Asia, Europe	swine
Gnathostoma lamothei Bertoni-Ruiz, García-Prieto, Osorio-Sarabia & León-Règagnon, 2005	Mexico	raccoons
Gnathostoma miyazakii Anderson, 1964	United States	otters
Gnathostoma procyonis Chandler, 1942	United States	raccoons
Gnathostoma sociale Leidy, 1858	United States	weasels
Gnathostoma spinigerum Owen, 1836	Asia, Oceania	canids, felids
Gnathostoma turgidum Stossich, 1902	Americas	opossums

Several other species are accepted in multiple review articles.

Species accepted in review articles	Distribution	Primary host
Gnathostoma doloresi Tubangui, 1924	Asia, Oceania	swine
Gnathostoma malaysiae Miyazaki & Dunn, 1965	Malaysia, Thailand	rats
Gnathostoma nipponicum Yamaguti, 1941	Japan, Korea	weasels
Gnathostoma vietnamicum Le Van Hoa, 1965	Vietnam, Thailand	otters

In 2025, Mosqueda-Cabrera et al. described a new species, Gnathostoma mexicanum, in Mexico with the Northern four-eyed opossum as its primary host. The authors state that G. mexicanum is distinguished from G. turgidum, which occurs in South America and the United States and also parasitizes opossums, by its body size, details of the cuticular spines, the site of host infections, and differences in internal transcribed spacer-2 sequences.

== Hosts ==
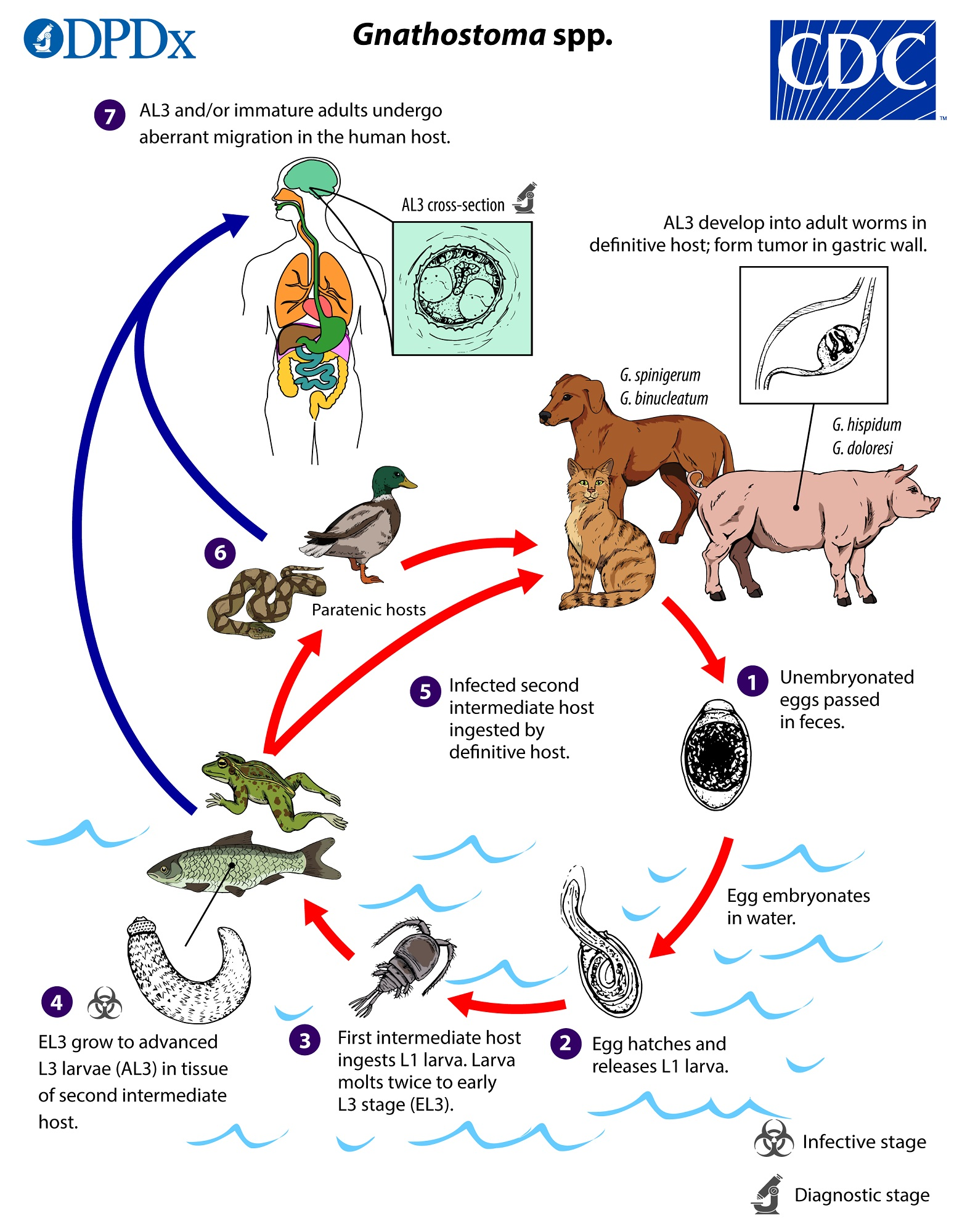
Generalized Gnathostoma life cycle

Gnathostoma species have life-cycles with multiple hosts. Eggs that reach fresh water develop embryos which hatch as first-stage larvae. The larvae are eaten by first intermediate hosts, copepods. The larvae molt twice in the copepods to become early third-stage larvae. The copepods are eaten by second intermediate hosts, typically fish and amphibians, where the larvae develop into advanced third-stage larvae. Second intermediate hosts may be eaten by paratenic hosts such as reptiles or birds, where the larvae stop developing but remain infectious. If an infected secondary or paratenic host is eaten by a definitive host, typically a carnivore or omnivore, the larvae in most species migrate to the wall of the host's stomach, (Note: There are some exceptions. Encysted adults of G. spinigerum, while found primarily in the stomachs of their hosts, have also been found embedded in the esophagus and duodenum of hosts. Adults of G. nipponicum found in weasels in Japan have been embedded in the lining of the esophagus, while those found in weasels on Jeju Island, Korea have been embedded in the stomach wall. Adults of G. miyazakii have only been found embedded in the fibrous tissues of kidneys of hosts. Adults of G. vietnamicum have also only been found embedded in the kidneys of hosts.) form a cyst, and develop into sexually mature adults.

Larval stages of Gnathostoma species infect a wide variety of second intermediate and paratenic hosts. As of 2008, the three species of Gnathostoma found in Mexico, G. binucleatum, G. lamothei, and G. turgidum, were known to parasitize a total of 80 species of vertebrates, including 39 species of fish, 19 species of birds, eight species of reptiles and mammals, and six species of amphibians. Most host species are parasitized by only one species of Gnathostoma, but larvae of G. turgidum and G. binucleatum have both been found in a few species, including the fish Oreochromis aureus and Gobiomorus dormitor and the Mexican mud turtle. Third-stage larvae of G. spinigerum have been found in 48 species of vertebrates in Thailand, including 20 fish, two amphibians, 11 reptiles, 11 birds, and four mammals. The most common second intermediate host of G. spinigerum in Thailand is the Asian swamp eel (Monopterus alba), which is also a second intermediate host for G. hispidum, G. doloresi, and G. vietnamicum.

Gnathostoma adults are more restricted in that only mammals serve as primary or definitive hosts. The usual final hosts for G. americanum are felids, for G. binucleatum, canids, felids, and swine, for G. doloresi and G. hispidum, swine, for G. lamothei and G. procyonis, raccoons, for G. malaysiae, rats, for G. miyazakii and G. vietnamicum, otters, for G. nipponicum and G. sociale, weasels, for G. spinigerum, canids and felids, and for G. turgidum, opossums.

== Human infections ==
Gnathostoma larvae are ingested by humans in raw or under-cooked second intermediate hosts (usually fish). Gnathostoma larvae do not reach sexual maturity in humans, but cause gnathostomiasis in the skin or internal organs. Six species of Gnathostoma have been identified as causing gnathostomiasis in humans: G. binucleatum, G. doloresi, G. hispidum, G. malaysiae, G. nipponicum, and G. spinigerum. Gnathostomiasis is endemic in Mainland Southeast Asia, the Philippines, and Japan, and is emerging in Mexico, Central America, and South America. Gnathostoma spinigerum is the primary cause of gnathostomiasis in Mainland Southeast Asia. G. binucleatum has been identified as the cause of cases of gnathostomiasis in Mexico and South America.

Neurognathostomiasis has occurred in the USA. Gnathostoma binucleatum (which is native to the Americas) has not been previously reported to cause neurognathostomiasis, suggesting that G. spinigerum has been introduced to the Americas, but a survey of isolates has not confirmed this.
