= Gnathostoma doloresi =

Scientific classification
- Kingdom: Animalia
- Phylum: Nematoda
- Class: Chromadorea
- Order: Rhabditida
- Family: Gnathostomatidae
- Genus: Gnathostoma
- Species: G. doloresi

Binomial name
- Gnathostoma doloresi Tubangui, 1924

Species of roundworm

Gnathostoma doloresi is a nematode that is a parasite of swines in Asia and Oceania and one cause of gnathostomiasis in humans.

== Description ==
Gnathostoma doloresi has a stout body, with the front two-thirds of the body wider than the last third. Adult males are 26 to 28 mm in length and 1.2 to 2.0 mm wide. Adult females are 30 to 44 mm long and 2.2 to 4.5 mm wide. Eggs have two polar caps, are oval, and have a pitted surface.

It has nine to ten transverse rows of hooks on the head end. The innermost row is sometimes incomplete. There is one pair of lips arranged vertically, with two pairs of papillae (small bumps) on each lip, one pair ventral (on the lower side) and one dorsal (on top). One papilla of each pair is closer to the mouth than the other. The body is covered with spines. The front third of the body is covered by spines with multiple points, while the spines on the remaining two-thirds of the body have only one point. The spines around the neck have four to five points, while the rest of the spines on the front third of the body have three points, and become smaller with distance from the neck.

Gnathostoma doloresi has been confused with G. hispidum, but is distinguished by details of the spines. The spines on the neck of G. hispidum have five to ten points, compared to the four to five on G. doloresi, multipoint spines cover only the front one-fifth of the body of G. hispidum, compared to one-third on G. doloresi, and the species differ on the shape and size of spines. G. doloresi has been reported from India, Japan, Palau, Papua New Guinea, Philippines, Russia (Primorsky Krai), Singapore, Soloman Islands, Taiwan, Thailand, and Vietnam.

== Life history ==
Gnathostoma doloresi has a multi-host life history, as do all species of Gnathostoma. The eggs hatch in fresh water and the larvae are eaten by copepods. The copepods are in turn eaten by second intermediate hosts (fish and amphibians), which may be consumed in turn by paratenic or transport hosts (reptiles and birds). Eventually, the larvae end up in the stomachs of the primary hosts, where the larvae embed in the stomach wall and develop into adults, and release eggs into the digestive tract. Embryos develop in eggs which reach fresh water.

== Human infection ==
Cases of gnathostomiasis caused by Gnathostoma doloresi resulting from the consumption of raw or under-cooked fresh-water fish have been reported from rural areas of Japan since 1984. Infecting larvae typically migrate to just under the skin on the torso and die in three months or less.
