= Gnathostoma vietnamicum =

Scientific classification
- Kingdom: Animalia
- Phylum: Nematoda
- Class: Chromadorea
- Order: Rhabditida
- Family: Gnathostomatidae
- Genus: Gnathostoma
- Species: G. vietnamicum

Binomial name
- Gnathostoma vietnamicum Le Van Hoa, 1965

Species of roundworm

Gnathostoma vietnamicum is a nematode that is a parasite of otters in Vietnam and Thailand.

Gnathostoma vietnamicum has a multi-host life history, as do all species of Gnathostoma. The eggs hatch in fresh water and the larvae are eaten by copepods. The copepods are in turn eaten by second intermediate hosts (fish and amphibians), which may be consumed in turn by paratenic or transport hosts (reptiles and birds). For most species of Gnathostoma, the larvae eventually end up in the stomachs of the primary hosts, where the larvae embed in the stomach wall and develop into adults, and release eggs into the digestive tract. Embryos develop in eggs which reach fresh water. G. vietnamicum differs in that adults of the species have been found in the urinary systems of the primary hosts. Adults of the species were first found in the kidneys of the Eurasian otter in Vietnam in 1965. Adults were subsequently found in the kidneys, ureters, and urinary bladders of the Asian small-clawed otter in Thailand in 1978.
