= Gnathostoma nipponicum =

Scientific classification
- Kingdom: Animalia
- Phylum: Nematoda
- Class: Chromadorea
- Order: Rhabditida
- Family: Gnathostomatidae
- Genus: Gnathostoma
- Species: G. nipponicum

Binomial name
- Gnathostoma nipponicum Yamaguti 1941

Species of roundworm

Gnathostoma nipponicum is a nematode that is a parasite of weasels in Japan and Korea and is one cause of gnathostomiasis in humans.

== Description ==
Gnathostoma nipponicum has eight to ten rows of hooks on the head end. The front half of the body is covered with spines. The spines immediately behind the head are slender with three or four points. Broad spines with three points cover approximately the first quarter of the body after the head. Slender three-pointed spines and smaller two- to three-pointed spines cover approximately the second quarter of the body. The rear half of the body does not have spines, except for some very small spines at the tail end of males only. Males are 22 to 27 mm long and 1.2 to 1.9 mm wide. Females are 35 to 45 mm long and 2.3 to 2.8 mm wide. Eggs have one polar cap.

== Life history ==
Gnathostoma nipponicum has a multi-host life history, as do all species of Gnathostoma. The eggs hatch in fresh water and the larvae are eaten by copepods. The copepods are in turn eaten by second intermediate hosts (fish and amphibians), which may be consumed in turn by paratenic or transport hosts (reptiles and birds). The intermediate or paratenic host may eventually be eaten by primary hosts, where the larvae develop into adults and release eggs into the digestive tract. Embryos develop in eggs which reach fresh water.

== Hosts ==
Gnathostoma nipponicum has been found in Japan in the primary hosts Siberian weasel (Mustela sibirica subsp. itasi and subsp. coreana), and on Jeju Island in Korea in the Jeju weasel (Mustela sibirica subsp. M. sibirica quelpartis). G. nipponicum adults found in weasels in Japan have been embedded in the lining of the esophagus, while those found in weasels on Jeju Island have been embedded in the stomach wall.

== Human infection ==
Cases of gnathostomiasis caused by Gnathostoma nipponicum resulting from the consumption of raw loaches have been reported from Japan.
