= Chalerm Prommas =

Thai doctor and minister of public health

Chalerm Prommas (Thai: เฉลิม พรมมาส, RTGS: Chaloem Phrommat; 19 August 1896 – 26 May 1975), also known by his former noble title as Luang Chaloem Khamphirawet (Thai: หลวงเฉลิมคัมภีรเวชช์), was a Thai medical doctor. He was a pioneering figure at Thailand's two oldest medical schools, Siriraj and Chulalongkorn, and went on to serve as the country's Minister of Public Health. He was also known for his academic work, most importantly the discovery, with Svasti Daengsvang, of the life cycle of the Gnathostoma spinigerum parasite, which causes gnathostomiasis in humans.
