= Gnathostoma malaysiae =

Scientific classification
- Kingdom: Animalia
- Phylum: Nematoda
- Class: Chromadorea
- Order: Rhabditida
- Family: Gnathostomatidae
- Genus: Gnathostoma
- Species: G. malaysiae

Binomial name
- Gnathostoma malaysiae Miyazaki & Dunn, 1965

Species of roundworm

Gnathostoma malaysiae is a nematode that is a parasite of rats in Malaysia and Thailand and is suspected of causing gnathostomiasis in humans.

== Description ==
When preserved in liquid, the rear third of the adult Gnathostoma malaysiae swells. The head has nine rows of hooks, with spines covering the rest of the body. Spines immediately behind the head have one or two points. Moving down the body the spines quickly become three pointed, with the middle point longer than the lateral points. After an interval of three-pointed spines, four-, five-, and some six-pointed spines gradually appear, and cover the middle part of the body. On the last third of the body, the part that swells when preserved in liquid, the spines rapidly decrease in size and number of points, with the spines on the back half of the swollen section having just one point. Males are 16 mm long, with the slender front part 10.5 to 11 mm long and 1.3 to 1.5 mm wide and the swollen rear part 5 to 5.5 mm long and 2.5 to 3 mm wide. Females are 20.8 to 22.3 mm long with the slender front part 12.8 to 14.3 mm long and 1.3 to 1.5 mm wide and the swollen rear part 5 to 5.5 mm long and 3 to 3.5 mm wide. Eggs have two polar caps, and a granulated surface. The type hosts were the red spiny rat (Macromys surifer and the Malayan field rat (Rattus tiomanicus). The type site was Tioman Island, Malaysia.

== Life history ==
Gnathostoma malaysiae has a multi-host life history, as do all species of Gnathostoma. The eggs hatch in fresh water and the larvae are eaten by copepods. The copepods are in turn eaten by second intermediate hosts (fish and amphibians), which may be consumed in turn by paratenic or transport hosts (reptiles and birds). Eventually, the larvae end up in the stomachs of the primary hosts, where the larvae embed in the stomach wall and develop into adults, and release eggs into the digestive tract. Embryos develop in eggs which reach fresh water.

== Human infection ==
Two cases of gnathostomiasis have been reported as possibly caused by Gnathostoma malaysiae larvae. Two Japanese men were diagnosed with gnathostomiasis after returning to Japan from Myanmar. Both had eaten raw freshwater shrimp in Myanmar, but no uncooked fish. A worm removed from under the skin of one of the men was identified as a larva of G. malaysiae.
