= Xyalidae =

Scientific classification
- Domain: Eukaryota
- Kingdom: Animalia
- Phylum: Nematoda
- Class: Chromadorea
- Order: Monhysterida
- Family: Xyalidae

Synonyms
- Xyalinidae

Family of worms

Xyalidae is a family of nematodes belonging to the order Monhysterida.

== Genera ==
Genera:

- Ammotheristus Lorenzen, 1977
- Amphimonhystera Timm, 1961
- Amphimonhystrella Timm, 1961
- Arabanema Turpeenniemi, Nasira & Maqbool, 2001
- Austronema Cobb, 1914
- Buccolaimus Allgén, 1959
- Capsula Bussau, 1993
- Cenolaimus Cobb, 1933
- Cienfuegia Armenteros, Vincx & Decraemer, 2009
- Cobbia de Man, 1907
- Corononema Nicholas & Stewart, 1995
- Dactylaimoides Blome, 2002
- Dactylaimus Cobb, 1920
- Daptonema Cobb, 1920
- Echinotheristus Thun & Riemann, 1967
- Elzalia Gerlach, 1957
- Enchonema Bussau, 1993
- Filipjeva Ditlevsen, 1928
- Gnomoxyala Lorenzen, 1977
- Gonionchus Cobb, 1920
- Guitartia Armenteros, 2010
- Gullanema Nicholas & Stewart, 1995
- Hofmaenneria Gerlach & Meyl, 1957
- Hofmaenneria Gerlach & Meyl, 1957
- Lamyronema Leduc, 2015
- Linhystera Juario, 1974
- Litotes Cobb, 1920
- Longilaimus Allgén, 1958
- Manganonema Bussau, 1993
- Marisalbinema Tchesunov, 1990
- Metadesmolaimus Schuurmans Stekhoven, 1935
- Omicronema Cobb, 1920
- Paradaptonema Gagarin, 2020
- Paragnomoxyala Jiang & Huang, 2015
- Paragonionchus Blome, 2002
- Paramonohystera Steiner, 1916
- Paramphimonhystrella Huang & Zhang, 2006
- Parelzalia Tchesunov, 1990
- Penzencia De Man
- Promonhystera Wieser, 1956
- Prorhynchonema Gourbault, 1982
- Pseudechinotheristus Blome, 2002
- Pseudelzalia Yu & Xu, 2015
- Pseudosteineria Wieser, 1956
- Pulchranemella N.Cobb, 1933
- Retrotheristus Lorenzen, 1977
- Rhynchonema Cobb, 1920
- Robustnema Nicholas, 1996
- Sacrimarinema Shoshin, 2001
- Scaptrella Cobb, 1917
- Sphaerotheristus Timm, 1968
- Spiramphinema Wieser, 1956
- Steineria Micoletzky, 1922
- Stylotheristus Lorenzen, 1977
- Theristus Bastian, 1865
- Theristus Bastian, 1865
- Valvaelaimus Lorenzen, 1977
- Wieserius Chitwood & Murphy, 1964
- Xenolaimus Cobb, 1920
- Xyala Cobb, 1920
- Zygonemella Cobb, 1920
