= Corononema =

Scientific classification
- Domain: Eukaryota
- Kingdom: Animalia
- Phylum: Nematoda
- Class: Chromadorea
- Order: Monhysterida
- Family: Xyalidae
- Genus: Corononema; Nicholas & Stewart, 1995

Type species
- Corononema parvum Nicholas & Stewart, 1995

Genus of roundworms

Corononema is a genus of coastal xyalid nematodes. The three known species are distributed in Australia, Thailand, and Vietnam.

== Description ==
There are eight prominently annulated longitudinal ridges on the cuticle (absent in C. vulgaris). The lips are high and deeply incised. Around the head, there is a deep groove posterior to the six inner labial setae and anterior to the outer labial and cephalic setae, which sets the labial parts apart from the slightly tapered pharyngostoma. The pharyngostoma is spacious and cylinder-shaped with strongly cuticularized walls. Amphidial fovea circle-shaped, located at the level of the pharyngostoma. The spicules are strongly curved ventrally, cephalated. The gubernaculum is small and without dorsal apophyses. Precloacal supplements absent.

== Species ==
The following three species are included as of 2023:

- Corononema parvum Nicholas & Stewart, 1995 Australia
- Corononema thai Nicholas & Stewart, 1995 Thailand
- Corononema vulgaris Nguyen et al., 2023 Vietnam
