= Gnathostoma hispidum =

Scientific classification
- Domain: Eukaryota
- Kingdom: Animalia
- Phylum: Nematoda
- Class: Chromadorea
- Order: Rhabditida
- Family: Gnathostomatidae
- Genus: Gnathostoma
- Species: G. hispidum

Binomial name
- Gnathostoma hispidum Fedtschenko, 1872

Species of roundworm

Gnathostoma hispidum is a nematode (roundworm) that infects many vertebrate animals including humans. Infection of Gnathostoma hispidum, like many species of Gnathostoma causes the disease gnathostomiasis due to the migration of immature worms in the tissues.

== Life cycle ==
In the natural definitive host (pigs, cats, dogs, wild animals), the adult worms reside in a tumor which they induce in the gastric wall. They deposit eggs that are unembryonated when passed in the feces. Eggs become embryonated in water, and eggs release first-stage larvae. If ingested by a small crustacean (Cyclops, first intermediate host), the first-stage larvae develop into second-stage larvae. Following ingestion of the Cyclops by a fish, frog, or snake (second intermediate host), the second-stage larvae migrate into the flesh and develop into third-stage larvae. When the second intermediate host is ingested by a definitive host, the third-stage larvae develop into adult parasites in the stomach wall. Alternatively, the second intermediate host may be ingested by the paratenic host (animals such as birds, snakes, and frogs) in which the third-stage larvae do not develop further but remain infective to the next predator. Humans become infected by eating undercooked fish or poultry containing third-stage larvae, or reportedly by drinking water containing infective second-stage larvae in Cyclops.

New research has just found to have linked snakes, such as Gloydius blomhoffii and Dinodon rufozonatum as intermediate hosts for Gnathostoma hispidum.

== Distribution ==
Gnathostomiasis is an endemic disease which is often seen to be in the areas of Asian countries such as Thailand, Japan, China, and in South America. A new surge of gnathostomiaisis are being found in Korea and Mexico due to importation of copepods. The most common incident of gnathostomiasis is found in Japan and Thailand due to the consumption of flesh loaches. This is partly caused by the loach-fish contaminated with infective larvae of Gnathostoma that some Japanese gourmets like to eat live. These fish have mainly been imported from other Asian countries.

== Clinical diagnosis and treatment ==
The medical signs in human gnathostomiasis are caused by migration of the immature worms (L3s). Migration in the subcutaneous tissues causes intermittent, migratory, painful, pruritic swellings (cutaneous larva migrans). Migration to other tissues (visceral larva migrans), can result in cough, hematuria, and ocular involvement, with the most serious manifestations eosinophilic meningitis with myeloencephalitis. High eosinophilia is present.

Surgical removal or treatment with albendazole or ivermectin is recommended. For additional information, see the recommendations in The Medical Letter (Drugs for Parasitic Infections).
