= Monhysteridae =

Scientific classification
- Kingdom: Animalia
- Phylum: Nematoda
- Class: Chromadorea
- Order: Monhysterida
- Superfamily: Monhysteroidea
- Family: Monhysteridae

Family of roundworms

Monhysteridae is a family of nematodes belonging to the order Monhysterida.

== Genera ==
Genera:

- Amphimonhystera Allgén, 1929
- Amphimonhystrella Timm, 1961
- Anguimonhystera Andrássy, 1981
- Diplolaimelloides Meyl, 1954
- Eumonhystera Andrássy, 1981
