= Gnathostomiasis =

Human disease

- Other names: Gnathostoma, Larva migrans profundus, Nodular migratory eosinophilic panniculitis, Spiruroid larva migrans, Wandering swelling, Yangtze edema
- Video showing movement of G. spinigerum larvae in an infected copepod
- Specialty: Infectious diseases, helminthology

Gnathostomiasis, also known as larva migrans profundus, is the human infection caused by any of six species of nematodes in the genus Gnathostoma, which infect vertebrates as second intermediate and primary hosts.

== Signs and symptoms ==
A few days after ingestion epigastric pain, fever, vomiting, and loss of appetite resulting from the migration of larvae through the intestinal wall to the abdominal cavity will appear in the patient. Migration of parasites in the subcutaneous tissues causing intermittent, migratory, painful, pruritic swellings is known as cutaneous larva migrans. Patches of edema appear after initial symptoms clear and are usually found on the abdomen. These lesions vary in size and can be accompanied by pruritus, rash, and stabbing pain. Swellings may last 1 to 4 weeks in a given area and reappear in a different location. Migration to other tissues causes visceral larva migrans and can result in cough, hematuria, ocular involvement, meningitis, encephalitis and eosinophilia. Eosinophilic myeloencephalitis may also result from invasion of the central nervous system by the larvae.

== Causes ==
Human gnathostomiasis is an infection by the migrating third-stage larvae of any of six species of Gnathostoma. Species of Gnathostoma identified as causing gnathostomiasis in humans include: G. binucleatum, G. doloresi, G. hispidum, G. malaysiae, G. nipponicum, and G. spinigerum. Gnathostomiasis is endemic in Mainland Southeast Asia, the Philippines, and Japan, and is emerging in Mexico, Central America, and South America. G. spinigerum is the primary cause of gnathostomiasis in Mainland Southeast Asia. The most common cause in the Americas is G. binucleatum. G. hispidium and G. doloresi occur in East and Southeast Asia; the former has also been found in Eastern Europe. G. nipponicum occurs only in Japan and China.

== Transmission ==
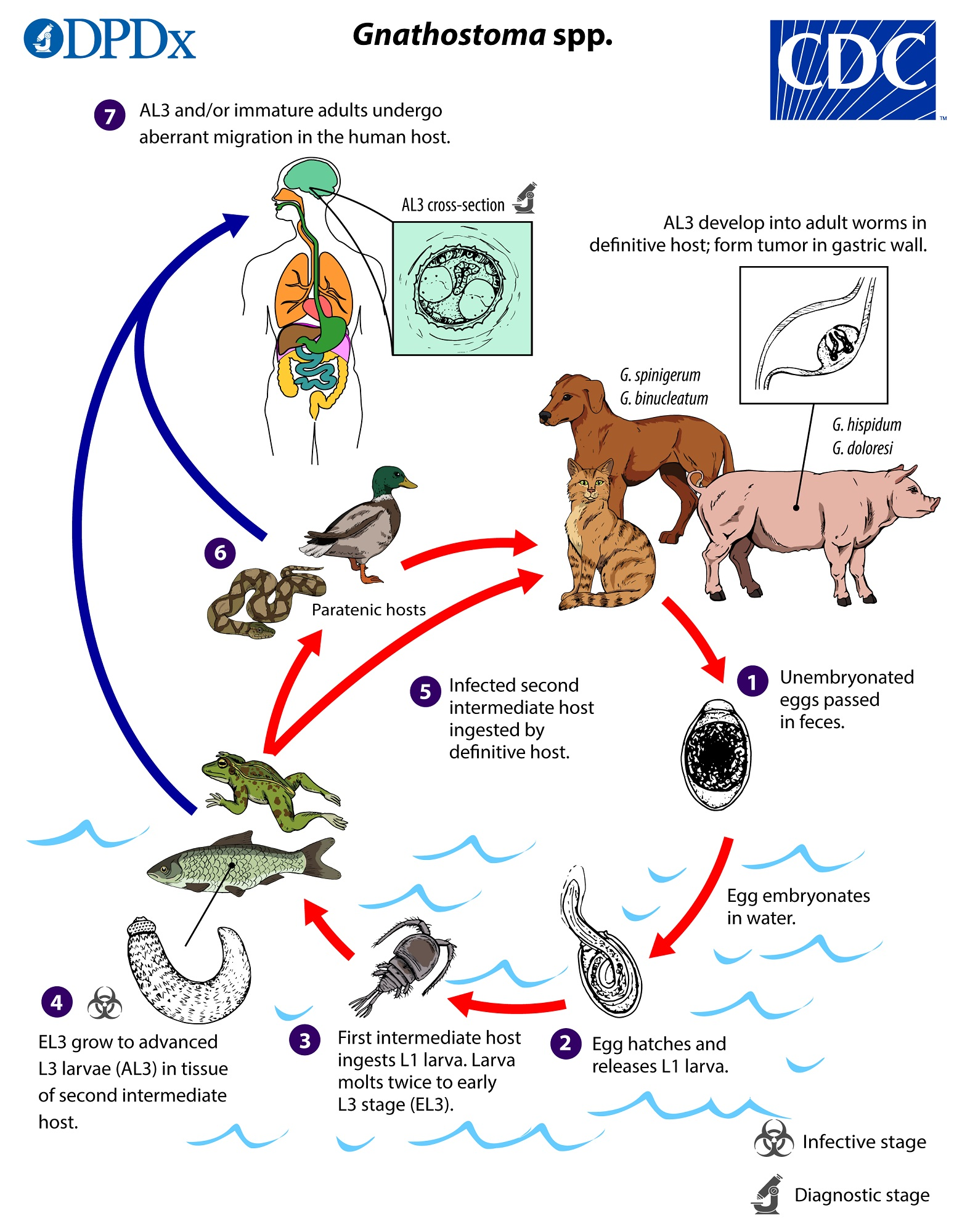
Life-cycle of Gnathostoma

Gnathostomiasis is transmitted by the ingestion of third-stage larvae from raw or insufficiently cooked second intermediate or paratenic hosts such as freshwater fish, snakes, poultry, or frogs.

In Thailand and Vietnam, the most common cause appears to be consumption of undercooked Asian swamp eels (Monopterus albus, also called Fluta alba) which transmit G. spinigerum. Monopterus albus is an invasive species in North America, but no Gnathostoma infections in humans have yet been conclusively identified in the US.

It is unclear if humans can be infected from drinking water contaminated with infected copepods.

== Hosts ==
=== Intermediate host ===
The primary intermediate host is the minute crustaceans of the genus Cyclops. These crustaceans are then ingested by a second intermediate host, such as frogs and freshwater fish. Paratenic hosts are usually animals that prey on second intermediate hosts, such as snakes and birds.

=== Definitive host ===
The definitive hosts for gnathostomiasis include omnivorous or carnivorous mammals such as cats, dogs, tigers, leopards, lions, mink, opossums or raccoons. Humans are accidental hosts, not definitive hosts.

== Incubation period ==
The incubation period for gnathostomiasis is 3–4 weeks when the larvae begin to migrate through the subcutaneous tissue of the body.

== Life cycle ==
=== Life cycle in definitive hosts ===
Adult worms are found in a tumor located in the gastric wall of the definitive hosts and release eggs into the host's digestive tract. The eggs are then released with feces and in about a week hatch in water to develop into first stage larvae. Larvae are then ingested by minute copepods of the genus Cyclops. Once entering the copepod, the larvae penetrate the gastric wall of their intermediate host and begin to develop into second-stage and even early third-stage larvae. The copepods are ingested by a second intermediate host such as fish, frogs, or snakes. Within this second intermediate or definitive host the larva repeat a similar pattern of penetrating the gastric wall but then continue to migrate to muscular tissue and develop into advanced third-stage larvae. These larvae then encyst within the musculature of the new host. If the cyst containing flesh of these hosts is ingested by a definitive host, such as dogs, and cats, the cysts are ingested and the larvae escape the cysts and penetrate the gastric wall. These released larvae travel to the connective tissue and muscle as observed before and after 4 weeks they return to the gastric wall as adults. Here they form a tumor and continue to mature into adults for the next 6–8 months. Worms mate and females begin to excrete fertilized eggs with feces 8–12 months after ingestion of cysts. They are passed out in the feces and eaten by another fish.

=== Life cycle in humans ===
Infection of humans by gnathostomiasis is accidental because humans are not one of the definitive hosts of the parasite and do not allow the parasite to complete its life cycle. Infection in humans follows ingestion of raw or insufficiently cooked infected intermediate hosts. The ingested third-stage larva migrates from the gastric wall and its migration results in the symptoms associated with infection by gnathostomiasis. The third-stage larvae don't return to the gastric wall preventing it from maturing into adult worms, leaving the life cycle incomplete. Instead, the larvae continue to migrate unpredictably unable to develop into adults, so eggs are seldom found in diagnostic tests or human feces. This also means the number of worms present in humans is a reflection of the number of third-stage larvae ingested.

== Diagnosis ==
Diagnosis of gnathostomiasis is possible (with microscopy) after removal of the worm. The primary form of diagnosis of gnathostomiasis is the identification of a larva in the tissue. Serological testing such as enzyme-linked immunosorbent assay (ELISA) or the Western blot are also reliable but may not be easily accessible in endemic areas.

CT scanning or MRI can be used to help identify a soft tissue worm and when looking at CNS disease it can be used to reveal the presence of the worm. The presence of haemorrhagic tracks on gradient-echo T2-weighted MRI is characteristic and possibly diagnostic.

== Prevention ==
The best strategy for preventing accidental infection of humans is to educate those living in endemic areas to only consume fully cooked meat. The inability of the parasite to complete its life cycle within humans means that transmission can easily be contained by adequate preparation of meat from intermediate hosts. This is especially useful because of the difficulty and lack of feasibility inherent in eliminating all intermediate hosts of gnathostomiasis. So instead, individuals in endemic areas should avoid eating raw and undercooked meat in endemic areas, but this may be difficult in these areas.

The dish ceviche is native to Peru and a favorite of Mexico. It consists of onion, cubed fish, lime or lemon juice and Andean spices including salt and chili. The ingredients are mixed and marinated for several hours before being served at room temperature. Then in endemic areas in Southeast Asia, there are traditional dishes associated with these areas that also include raw uncooked fish, such as koipla in Thailand, goi ca song in Vietnam, sashimi and sushi in Japan.

Acknowledging these cultural traditions, individuals in these cultures can be educated on adapting their food preparation activities to remove the larvae without greatly altering these traditional dishes. For instance, meat should be marinated in vinegar for six hours or in soy sauce for 12 hours to kill the larvae successfully. In areas with reliable electricity, meat can be frozen at -20 degrees Celsius for 3–5 days to achieve the same results of killing the larvae present.

== Treatment ==
Surgical removal or treatment with albendazole or ivermectin is recommended. The most prescribed treatment for gnathostomiasis is surgical removal of the larvae but this is only effective when the worms are located in an accessible location. In addition to surgical excision, albendazole and ivermectin have been noted in their ability to eliminate the parasite. Albendazole is administered at 400 mg daily for 21 days as an adjunct to surgical excision, while ivermectin is better tolerated as a single dose. Ivermectin can also serve as a replacement for those that can't handle albendazole 200 ug/kg p.o. as a single dose. Ivermectin is less effective than albendazole.

== Epidemiology ==
Endemic areas include Asia, Mexico, India and parts of South Africa. Originally believed to be confined to Asia, in the 1970s gnathostomiasis was discovered in Mexico, and found in Australia in 2011. Even though it is endemic in areas of Southeast Asia and Latin America, it is an uncommon disease. However, researchers have noticed recently an increase in incidence. This disease is most common in both Thailand and Japan. In Thailand, it is the most common cause of central nervous system parasitic infections. As of 2009, 23 cases in China were reported in Chinese literature. As of 2020, about 5,000 cases of Gnathostomiasis have been reported globally.

== History ==
The first case of Gnathostoma infection was identified by Sir Richard Owen in 1836, when inspecting the stomach of a young tiger that had died at London Zoo from a ruptured aorta. However it was not until 1889 that the first human case was described by Levinson when he found the Gnathostoma larva in an infested Thai woman. The lifecycle of G. spinigerum was described by Svasti Daengsvang and Chalerm Prommas from Thailand in 1933 and 1936. This delay in identification of the parasite in humans is because humans are not a definitive host for this parasite making infection from this parasite rare. Gnathostomiasis infection is rare because the parasite must be digested when it has reached its third larvae stage, providing only a short time in which the parasite can infect humans. It is uncommon for the larvae to penetrate the skin of individuals exposed to contaminated food or water without ingestion.

== See also ==
- List of parasites (human)
- List of migrating cutaneous conditions
