= Eumonhystera =

Scientific classification
- Domain: Eukaryota
- Kingdom: Animalia
- Phylum: Nematoda
- Class: Chromadorea
- Order: Monhysterida
- Family: Monhysteridae
- Genus: Eumonhystera; Andrássy, 1981

Genus of roundworms

Eumonhystera is a genus of nematodes belonging to the family Monhysteridae.

The species of this genus are found in Europe and Northern America.

Species:

- Eumonhystera abyssalis Gagarin & Naumova, 2010
- Eumonhystera alpina (Filipjev, 1918)
