= Mesocyclops aspericornis =

Scientific classification
- Domain: Eukaryota
- Kingdom: Animalia
- Phylum: Arthropoda
- Class: Copepoda
- Order: Cyclopoida
- Family: Cyclopidae
- Genus: Mesocyclops
- Species: M. aspericornis

Binomial name
- Mesocyclops aspericornis (Daday, 1906)

Species of crustacean

Mesocyclops aspericornis is a freshwater copepod species in the genus Mesocyclops found in the tropics. It was collected from Sumatra, Singapore and Hawaii.

Together with the mosquito species Toxorhynchites speciosus, M. aspericornis forms a compatible predator pair for reduction of larval Aedes notoscriptus and Culex quinquefasciatus populations in tire habitats in Queensland. It has also been used in combination with Bacillus thuringiensis var. israelensis in controlling Aedes aegypti larvae in Thailand.
