= Mesocyclops pehpeiensis =

Scientific classification
- Kingdom: Animalia
- Phylum: Arthropoda
- Clade: Pancrustacea
- Class: Copepoda
- Order: Cyclopoida
- Family: Cyclopidae
- Genus: Mesocyclops
- Species: M. pehpeiensis

Binomial name
- Mesocyclops pehpeiensis Hu, 1943

Species of crustacean

Mesocyclops pehpeiensis is a species of copepod in the family Cyclopidae native to Asia. It is closely related to Mesocyclops ferjemurami and Mesocyclops papuensis. In 2018 it was reported that M. pehpeiensis has been found in western Lake Erie.
