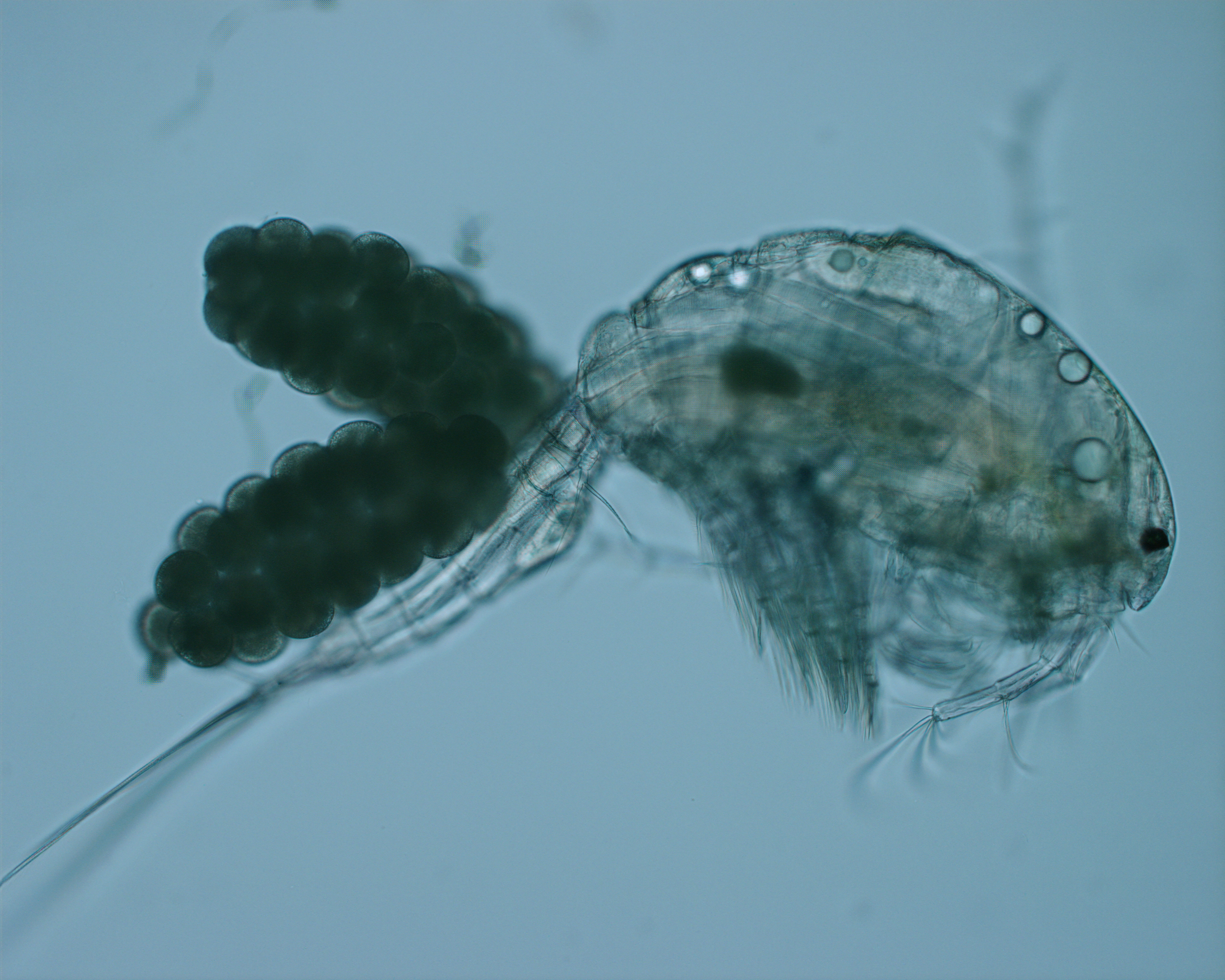
- Mesocyclops ogunnus

Scientific classification
- Kingdom: Animalia
- Phylum: Arthropoda
- Clade: Pancrustacea
- Class: Copepoda
- Order: Cyclopoida
- Family: Cyclopidae
- Genus: Mesocyclops; G. O. Sars, 1914

Type species
- Mesocyclops leuckarti (Claus, 1857)

= Mesocyclops =

Genus of crustaceans

Mesocyclops is a genus of copepod crustaceans in the family Cyclopidae. Because the various species of Mesocyclops are known to prey on mosquito larvae, it is used as a nontoxic and inexpensive form of biological mosquito control.

== Biological control ==
Individuals of Mesocyclops can be easily harvested, bred and released into freshwater containers where the Aedes aegypti mosquito larvae (the vector of Dengue fever) live. A big advantage of the Mesocyclops is that it is possible to teach schoolchildren how to recognize and collect them so that communities are able to perform sustainable mosquito control without much professional or governmental assistance.

A field trial in Vietnam has shown that large-scale elimination of Aedes aegypti larvae is possible. Because Mesocyclops is a host for the parasitic round worm Guinea worm (Dracunculus medinensis, the causative agent of dracunculiasis), this method is potentially hazardous in the small number of countries where the Guinea worm still occurs. Furthermore, many cultures have traditions and customs that forbid the introduction of animals into freshwater storage vessels as dangerous taboos.

== Species ==
The genus Mesocyclops contains 92 species and 2 species nomen dubium:

- Mesocyclops acanthoramus Holynska & Brown, 2003
- Mesocyclops aequatorialis Kiefer, 1929
- Mesocyclops affinis van de Velde, 1987
- Mesocyclops albicans (G. W. Smith, 1909)
- Mesocyclops americanus Dussart, 1985
- Mesocyclops annae Kiefer, 1930
- Mesocyclops annulatus (Wierzejski, 1892)
- Mesocyclops araucanus Löffler, 1962
- Mesocyclops arcanus Defaye, 1995
- Mesocyclops asiaticus Kiefer, 1932
- Mesocyclops aspericornis (Daday, 1906)
- Mesocyclops australiensis (G. O. Sars, 1908)
- Mesocyclops augusti Papa & Holynska, 2013
- Mesocyclops bernardi Petkovski, 1986
- Mesocyclops bodanicola Kiefer, 1955
- Mesocyclops borneoensis Dussart & Fernando, 1988
- Mesocyclops bosumtwii Mirabdullayev, Sanful & Frempong, 2007
- Mesocyclops brasilianus Kiefer, 1933
- Mesocyclops brevisetosus Dussart & Sarnita, 1987
- Mesocyclops brooksi Pesce, De Laurentiis & Humphreys, 1996
- Mesocyclops chaci Fiers (in Fiers, Reid, Iliffe & Suárez-Morales), 1996
- Mesocyclops cuttacuttae Dumont & Maas, 1985
- Mesocyclops dadayi Holynska, 1997
- Mesocyclops darwini Dussart & Fernando, 1988
- Mesocyclops dayakorum Holynska, 2000
- Mesocyclops dissimilis Defaye & Kawabata, 1993
- Mesocyclops dussarti van de Velde, 1984
- Mesocyclops edax (Forbes, 1891)
- Mesocyclops ellipticus Kiefer, 1936
- Mesocyclops evadomingoi Gutierrez-Aguirre & Suarez-Morales, 2001
- Mesocyclops ferjemurami Holynska & Nam, 2000
- Mesocyclops francisci Holynska, 2000
- Mesocyclops friendorum Holynska, 2000
- Mesocyclops geminus Holynska, 2000
- Mesocyclops granulatus Dussart & Fernando, 1988
- Mesocyclops guangxiensis Reid & Kay, 1992
- Mesocyclops holynskae Karanovic, 2006
- Mesocyclops insulensis Dussart, 1982
- Mesocyclops intermedius Pesce, 1985
- Mesocyclops iranicus Lindberg, 1936
- Mesocyclops isabellae Dussart & Fernando, 1988
- Mesocyclops jakartensis Alekseev (in Alekseev, Haffner, Vaillant & Yusoff), 2013
- Mesocyclops kawamurai K. Kikuchi, 1940
- Mesocyclops kayi Holynska & Brown, 2003
- Mesocyclops kieferi van de Velde, 1984
- Mesocyclops leuckarti (Claus, 1857)
- Mesocyclops longisetus (Thiébaud, 1912)
- Mesocyclops major G. O. Sars, 1927
- Mesocyclops mariae Guo, 2000
- Mesocyclops medialis Defaye, 2001
- Mesocyclops meridianus (Kiefer, 1926)
- Mesocyclops meridionalis Dussart & Frutos, 1986
- Mesocyclops microlasius Kiefer, 1981
- Mesocyclops microspinulosus Lindberg, 1942
- Mesocyclops monardi (Perret, 1925)
- Mesocyclops mongoliensis Kiefer, 1981
- Mesocyclops nigerianus Kiefer, 1932
- Mesocyclops notius Kiefer, 1981
- Mesocyclops obsoletus (Koch, 1838)
- Mesocyclops ogunnus Onabamiro, 1957
- Mesocyclops paludosus Lindberg, 1956
- Mesocyclops papuensis van de Velde, 1987
- Mesocyclops paranaensis Dussart & Frutos, 1986
- Mesocyclops parentium Holynska, 1997
- Mesocyclops pehpeiensis Hu, 1943
- Mesocyclops pescei Petkovski, 1986
- Mesocyclops pilosus Kiefer, 1930
- Mesocyclops pseudoannae van de Velde, 1987
- Mesocyclops pseudomeridianus Defaye & Dussart, 1989
- Mesocyclops pseudooperculatus (Lindberg, 1957)
- Mesocyclops pseudospinosus Dussart & Fernando, 1988
- Mesocyclops pubiventris Holynska & Brown, 2003
- Mesocyclops rarus Kiefer, 1981
- Mesocyclops reidae Petkovski, 1986
- Mesocyclops restrictus Dussart & Fernando, 1985
- Mesocyclops ruttneri Kiefer, 1981
- Mesocyclops salinus Onabamiro, 1957
- Mesocyclops shenzhenensis Guo, 2000
- Mesocyclops simillimus Brady, 1907
- Mesocyclops sondoongensis Tran & Holynska, 2015
- Mesocyclops spinosus van de Velde, 1984
- Mesocyclops splendidus Lindberg, 1943
- Mesocyclops strenuus (Daday, 1905)
- Mesocyclops tenuisaccus (G. O. Sars, 1927)
- Mesocyclops thermocyclopoides Harada, 1931
- Mesocyclops tobae Kiefer, 1933
- Mesocyclops trispinosus (Shen & Tai, 1964)
- Mesocyclops woutersi van de Velde, 1987
- Mesocyclops wraniki Baribwegure & Dumont, 2000
- Mesocyclops yenae Holynska, 1998
- Mesocyclops yesoensis Ishida, 1999
- Mesocyclops yutsil Reid in Fiers, Reid, Iliffe & Suárez-Morales, 1996
- Mesocyclops cokeri Najam-un-Nisa, Mahoon & Irfa Khan, 1987 (nomen dubium)
- Mesocyclops forbesi Najam-un-Nisa, Mahoon & Irfa Khan, 1987 (nomen dubium)
- Mesocyclops brehmi Kiefer, 1927 → Thermocyclops brehmi (Kiefer, 1927)
- Mesocyclops brevifurcatus Harada, 1931 → Thermocyclops crassus (Fischer, 1853)
- Mesocyclops consimilis Kiefer, 1934 → Thermocyclops consimilis Kiefer, 1934
- Mesocyclops crassus (Fischer, 1853) → Thermocyclops crassus (Fischer, 1853)
- Mesocyclops curvatus Kiefer, 1981 → Mesocyclops salinus Onabamiro, 1957
- Mesocyclops decipiens Kiefer, 1929 → Thermocyclops decipiens (Kiefer, 1929)
- Mesocyclops delamarei Lescher-Moutoué, 1971 → Kieferiella delamarei (Lescher-Moutoué, 1971)
- Mesocyclops dybowskii (Landé, 1890) → Thermocyclops dybowskii dybowskii (Landé, 1890)
- Mesocyclops emini (Mrázek, 1898) → Thermocyclops emini (Mrázek, 1898)
- Mesocyclops gracilis (Lilljeborg, 1853) → Metacyclops gracilis (Lilljeborg, 1853)
- Mesocyclops hyalinus (Rehberg, 1880) → Thermocyclops hyalinus (Rehberg, 1880)
- Mesocyclops ianthinus Harada, 1931 → Thermocyclops ianthinus Harada, 1931
- Mesocyclops incisus Kiefer, 1932 → Thermocyclops incisus (Kiefer, 1932)
- Mesocyclops infrequens Kiefer, 1929 → Thermocyclops infrequens (Kiefer, 1929)
- Mesocyclops inopinus (Kiefer, 1926) → Thermocyclops inopinus (Kiefer, 1926)
- Mesocyclops inversus Kiefer, 1936 → Thermocyclops inversus (Kiefer, 1936)
- Mesocyclops macracanthus Kiefer, 1929 → Thermocyclops macracanthus (Kiefer, 1929)
- Mesocyclops maheensis Lindberg, 1941 → Thermocyclops maheensis Lindberg, 1941
- Mesocyclops minutus Lowndes, 1934 → Thermocyclops minutus (Lowndes, 1934)
- Mesocyclops neglectus G. O. Sars, 1909 → Thermocyclops neglectus (Sars G.O., 1909)
- Mesocyclops nicaraguensis Herbst, 1960 → Mesocyclops edax (Forbes, 1891)
- Mesocyclops oblongatus G. O. Sars, 1927 → Thermocyclops oblongatus (Sars G.O., 1927)
- Mesocyclops oithonoides (G. O. Sars, 1863) → Thermocyclops oithonoides (Sars G.O., 1863)
- Mesocyclops operculifer Kiefer, 1930 → Thermocyclops operculifer Kiefer, 1930
- Mesocyclops orghidani Plesa, 1981 → Thermocyclops orghidani (Plesa, 1981)
- Mesocyclops rectus Lindberg, 1937 → Thermocyclops rectus (Lindberg, 1937)
- Mesocyclops retroversus Kiefer, 1929 → Thermocyclops retroversus (Kiefer, 1929)
- Mesocyclops rylovi Smirnov, 1928 → Thermocyclops rylovi rylovi (Smirnov, 1928)
- Mesocyclops schmeili (Poppe & Mrázek, 1895) → Thermocyclops schmeili (Poppe & Mrázek, 1895)
- Mesocyclops schuurmanae Kiefer, 1928 → Thermocyclops schuurmanae (Kiefer, 1928)
- Mesocyclops spinifer (Daday, 1902) → Mesocyclops annulatus (Wierzejski, 1892)
- Mesocyclops taihokuensis Harada, 1931 → Thermocyclops taihokuensis Harada, 1931
- Mesocyclops tenellus (G. O. Sars, 1909) → Tropocyclops tenellus (Sars G.O., 1909)
- Mesocyclops tenuis (Marsh, 1910) → Thermocyclops tenuis (Marsh, 1910)
- Mesocyclops tinctus (Lindberg, 1936) → Thermocyclops tinctus Lindberg, 1936
- Mesocyclops trichophorus Kiefer, 1930 → Thermocyclops trichophorus Kiefer, 1930
- Mesocyclops varius Dussart, 1987 → Mesocyclops brasilianus Kiefer, 1933
- Mesocyclops venezolanus Dussart, 1987 → Mesocyclops brasilianus Kiefer, 1933
- Mesocyclops vermifer Lindberg, 1935 → Thermocyclops vermifer Lindberg, 1935
- Mesocyclops vizarae Fryer, 1957 → Thermocyclops vizarae (Fryer, 1957)
