= Mesocyclops longisetus =

Scientific classification
- Kingdom: Animalia
- Phylum: Arthropoda
- Clade: Pancrustacea
- Class: Copepoda
- Order: Cyclopoida
- Family: Cyclopidae
- Genus: Mesocyclops
- Species: M. longisetus

Binomial name
- Mesocyclops longisetus (Thiébaud, 1912)

Synonyms
- Cyclops leuckarti longiseta (Thiébaud, 1912); Cyclops simplex setosus Wierzejski, 1893

Species of crustacean

Mesocyclops longisetus is a species of freshwater copepod in the family Cyclopidae. Two subspecies are accepted, Mesocyclops longisetus curvatus Dussart, 1987, and Mesocyclops longisetus longisetus (Thiébaud, 1912). It has a neotropical distribution.

== Description ==
Like other copepods in the order Cyclopoida, these are small, planktonic, free-living animals. They are distinguished from closely related groups by having the first antenna shorter than the combined length of the head and thorax, the second antenna being unbranched. The cephalothorax length of the adult female is 1 mm (0.04 in), and that of the male is 0.6 mm (0.024 in).

== Life cycle ==
The eggs take about 42 hours to hatch at 25°C and about 30 hours at 30°C. The average time for development through several nauplia larval stages is 22 days for females and 18 for males.

== Ecology ==
These copepods are capable of rapid movement. Their larval development is metamorphic, and the embryos are carried attached to the underside of the first abdominal somite.

== Use in biological control ==
Culex quinquefasciatus is a vector of the parasites that cause the human disease filariasis. Mesocyclops longisetus is a predator and feeds on mosquito larvae, including C. quinquefasciatus, with the predatory efficiency against the first and second instars being 84 and 63% respectively. Another method of killing the mosquito larvae is the use of silver nanoparticles synthesized with the help of the green seaweed Caulerpa scalpelliformis. Combining these two methods did not significantly alter the predatory efficiency of the copepod, reducing it to 78 and 59% respectively.

A trial in Florida which studied the rainwater that accumulates in containers such as tyres, plastic buckets and flower vases, showed that the larvae of the mosquitoes Aedes albopictus, Ochlerotatus triseriatus, and Culex quinquefasciatus could be eliminated by the introduction into the containers of M. longisetus.
