= Mesocyclops insulensis =

Conservation status
- Vulnerable (IUCN 2.3)

Scientific classification
- Kingdom: Animalia
- Phylum: Arthropoda
- Class: Copepoda
- Order: Cyclopoida
- Family: Cyclopidae
- Genus: Mesocyclops
- Species: M. insulensis

Binomial name
- Mesocyclops insulensis Dussart, 1982

Species of crustacean

Mesocyclops insulensis is a species of copepod in the family Cyclopidae, endemic to Lake Bemapaza, on Nosy Bé island, Madagascar.
