= Daptonema =

Scientific classification
- Domain: Eukaryota
- Kingdom: Animalia
- Phylum: Nematoda
- Class: Chromadorea
- Order: Monhysterida
- Family: Xyalidae
- Genus: Daptonema; Cobb, 1920

Genus of roundworms

Daptonema is a genus of nematodes belonging to the family Xyalidae.

The genus has cosmopolitan distribution.

Species:

- Daptonema acanthospiculum (Allgén, 1959) Gerlach & Riemann, 1973
- Daptonema acrilabiatum (De Coninck & Schuurmans Stekhoven, 1933) Lorenzen, 1977
- Daptonema adiecta (Schulz, 1932) Wieser, 1956
- Daptonema aegypticum (Gerlach, 1964) Lorenzen, 1977
- Daptonema altaicum Tsalolikhin, 1985
- Daptonema altaicus (Tsalolikhin, 1985)
- Daptonema alternum (Wieser, 1956) Lorenzen, 1977
- Daptonema amphorum Leduc, 2015
- Daptonema angulatum (Schuurmans Stekhoven, 1950) Wieser, 1956
- Daptonema aquadulcis (Gagarin, 1987)
- Daptonema aquaedulcis (Gagarin, 1987) Gagarin, 1993
- Daptonema arcospiculum (Allgén, 1947) Wieser, 1956
- Daptonema arcticus (Steiner, 1916) Filipjev, 1922
- Daptonema articulatum Lorenzen, 1977
- Daptonema australis Allgén, 1951
- Daptonema balatum Tu, Gagarin, Thanh, Phuong & Hien, 2014
- Daptonema bathylaimum Allgén, 1959
- Daptonema biggi (Gerlach, 1965) Lorenzen, 1977
- Daptonema biwaensis (Tsalolikhin, 2002) Venekey, Gheller, Maria, Brustolin, Kandratavicius, Vieira, Brito, Souza & Fonseca, 2014
- Daptonema borealis Gagarin, 2021
- Daptonema brevisetosum Thanh & Gagarin, 2009
- Daptonema buelkiensis (Schulz, 1932) Wieser, 1956
- Daptonema buetschlioides (Chitwood, 1951) Lorenzen, 1977
- Daptonema calcaneus (Schuurmans-Stekhoven, 1950) Wieser, 1956
- Daptonema calceolatum (De Coninck & Schuurmans Stekhoven, 1933) Lorenzen, 1977
- Daptonema chesapeakensis (Timm, 1952)
- Daptonema chonispiculum Aryuthaka & Kito, 2018
- Daptonema circulum (Vitiello, 1971) Lorenzen, 1977
- Daptonema circumscriptum Wieser, 1959
- Daptonema clavicaudatum (Gerlach, 1953) Lorenzen, 1981
- Daptonema concordiense Pastor de Ward, 1985
- Daptonema conicum (Filipjev, 1922) Lorenzen, 1977
- Daptonema crassissima Ditlevsen, 1911
- Daptonema crassissimus (Ditlevsen, 1911)
- Daptonema curticauda (Tchesunov, 1980) Tchesunov, 1990
- Daptonema curvatus Gerlach, 1956
- Daptonema curvispicula Tchesunov & Miljutina, 2006
- Daptonema curvispiculum (Gerlach, 1953) Wieser, 1959
- Daptonema cuspidospiculum (Allgén, 1932) Wieser, 1956
- Daptonema dentatum (Wieser, 1956)
- Daptonema dihystera Gagarin & Thanh, 2005
- Daptonema divertens (Boucher & Helléouet, 1977)
- Daptonema dolichurus Nguyen, Thanh & Gagarin, 2004
- Daptonema donghaiensis A.n.Wang & Huang, 2018
- Daptonema donsi (Allgén, 1948) Lorenzen, 1977
- Daptonema dubium (Bütschli, 1873) Lorenzen, 1977
- Daptonema durum Gagarin & Thu, 2008
- Daptonema ecphygmaticum (Wieser, 1959)
- Daptonema elaboratum (Chitwood, 1951)
- Daptonema elegans (Kreis, 1929)
- Daptonema elongatum Gagarin & Thu, 2008
- Daptonema erectum (Wieser & Hopper, 1967)
- Daptonema eximium Gagarin & Lemzina, 1981
- Daptonema exutum (Wieser, 1956)
- Daptonema fallax (Lorenzen, 1972) Lorenzen, 1977
- Daptonema filicaudatus Allgen, 1959
- Daptonema filispiculum (Allgén, 1932) Wieser, 1956
- Daptonema fimbriatus (Cobb, 1920) Hopper, 1969
- Daptonema fissidens Cobb, 1920
- Daptonema fistulatum (Wieser & Hopper, 1967)
- Daptonema flagellicauda (Lorenzen, 1973)
- Daptonema floridanum (Wieser & Hopper, 1967)
- Daptonema foetidum Gagarin & Thanh, 2010
- Daptonema fortis Gagarin, 1993
- Daptonema frigidum (Cobb, 1914) Wieser, 1956
- Daptonema furcatum (Juario, 1974)
- Daptonema galeatum (Wieser & Hopper, 1967) Aryuthaka & Kito, 2018
- Daptonema gracillimecaudatus (Allgén, 1946)
- Daptonema grahami (Allgén, 1959) Lorenzen, 1977
- Daptonema gritsenkovi Gagarin & Lemzina, 1981
- Daptonema groenlandicum (Ditlevsen, 1928)
- Daptonema gyrophorum (Wieser, 1956)
- Daptonema heterum (Gerlach, 1957)
- Daptonema hirsutum (Vitiello, 1967)
- Daptonema hirtum (Gerlach, 1951)
- Daptonema hyalocella Aryuthaka & Kito, 2012
- Daptonema iners Nguyen, Thanh & Gagarin, 2004
- Daptonema intermedius Tchesunov, 1980
- Daptonema invagiferoum (Platt, 1973)
- Daptonema inversum Alekseev, 1984
- Daptonema karabugasensis Tchesunov, 1980
- Daptonema kornoeense (Allgén, 1929)
- Daptonema lata (Cobb, 1894) Lorenzen, 1977
- Daptonema laxum (Wieser, 1956)
- Daptonema leptogastrelloides Riemann, 1979
- Daptonema levis Rieger & Ott, 1971
- Daptonema limnobia Wu & Liang, 2000
- Daptonema longiapophysis Huang & Zhang, 2010
- Daptonema longicaudatum (Filipjev, 1922) Lorenzen, 1977
- Daptonema longissimecaudatum (Kreis, 1935)
- Daptonema lopezi Pastor de Ward, 1985
- Daptonema macrocirculus (Allgén, 1959)
- Daptonema maeoticum (Filipjev, 1922)
- Daptonema marylinicus Timm, 1952
- Daptonema miamiense (Hopper, 1969) Lorenzen, 1977
- Daptonema microspiculum (Gerlach, 1953) Lorenzen, 1977
- Daptonema mirabilis (Schuurmans Stekhoven & De Coninck, 1933)
- Daptonema modestum Tchesunov, 1990
- Daptonema nannospiculus (Tchesunov, 1980)
- Daptonema nanum (Lorenzen, 1971)
- Daptonema naviculivorus (Cobb, 1930) Wieser, 1956
- Daptonema nearticulatum (Huang & Zhang, 2006) Aryuthaka & Kito, 2018
- Daptonema normandicum (de Man, 1890)
- Daptonema norvegicus (Allgén, 1946)
- Daptonema notoistospiculoides (Allgén, 1959)
- Daptonema notosetosus (Allgén, 1959)
- Daptonema obesum Gagarin, 2001
- Daptonema obesus Gagarin, 2001
- Daptonema osadchikae (Tchesunov, 1980) Tchesunov, 1990
- Daptonema osadchikhae (Tchesunov, 1980) Tchesunov, 1990
- Daptonema ostentator Wieser & Hopper, 1967
- Daptonema oxycerca (de Man, 1888)
- Daptonema oxyuroides (Stekhoven, 1931)
- Daptonema papillatus (Murphy, 1965)
- Daptonema papillifera Sun, Huang, Tang, Zang, Xiao & Tang, 2019
- Daptonema parabreviseta Huang, Sun & Huang, 2019
- Daptonema paracircumscriptum Fadeeva & Belogurov, 1987
- Daptonema paradonsi (Gerlach & Riemann, 1973)
- Daptonema paraelaboratum (Timm, 1952)
- Daptonema paramonovi T.u.Long & Gagarin, 2020
- Daptonema paraoxyuroides Tu, Gagarin, Thanh, Phuong & Hien, 2014
- Daptonema paratortum (Vitiello, 1971)
- Daptonema paroistospiculoides (Allgén, 1959)
- Daptonema phuketense Aryuthaka & Kito, 2018
- Daptonema planiere (Vitiello, 1971) Lorenzen, 1977
- Daptonema platonovae (Galtsova, 1976) Tchesunov, 1990
- Daptonema polaris (Cobb, 1914) Wieser, 1956
- Daptonema procerum (Gerlach, 1951)
- Daptonema prominens (Vitiello, 1971)
- Daptonema proprium (Lorenzen, 1972)
- Daptonema psammoides (Warwick, 1970)
- Daptonema pseudotortum (Vitiello, 1971)
- Daptonema pumilus Thanh Nguyen Vu, Lai Phu Hoang & Gagarin V.G., 2005
- Daptonema rectangulatum Pastor de Ward, 1985
- Daptonema resimum (Wieser, 1959) Lorenzen, 1977
- Daptonema rigidum Gagarin, Thanh & Nguyen, 2005
- Daptonema robustus Tchesunov, 1980
- Daptonema romanelloi Pastor de Ward, 1985
- Daptonema rusticum (Kreis, 1929)
- Daptonema salinae Gagarin & Gusakov, 2014
- Daptonema salvum Gagarin, Thanh & Nguyen, 2005
- Daptonema sanctimarteni (Timm, 1957)
- Daptonema securum Nguyen Thi Xyan Phuong, Judith C.Klein, Pham Thj Man, Gagarin V.G. & Nguyen Dinh Tu, 2016
- Daptonema septentrionalis (Cobb, 1914)
- Daptonema setifer (Gerlach, 1952)
- Daptonema setihyalocella Aryuthaka & Kito, 2012
- Daptonema setosum (Bütschli, 1874)
- Daptonema sibiricum Gagarin, 2000
- Daptonema simplex (Allgén, 1959)
- Daptonema sinuosus Wieser, 1959
- Daptonema sphaerolaimoides (Schulz, 1932) Lorenzen, 1977
- Daptonema spirum (Gerlach, 1959)
- Daptonema stylosum (Lorenzen, 1973)
- Daptonema svalbardense (Gerlach, 1965)
- Daptonema tenuispiculum (Ditlevsen, 1918)
- Daptonema timmi (Timm, 1961) Gagarin & Nguyen, 2008
- Daptonema timoshkini Gagarin, 2001
- Daptonema tortum (Wieser & Hopper, 1967)
- Daptonema tortuosum (Timm, 1961)
- Daptonema trabeculosum (Schneider, 1906)
- Daptonema trecuspidatum (Wieser, 1959)
- Daptonema trichinus (Gerlach, 1956)
- Daptonema trichospiculum (Allgén, 1933) Wieser, 1956
- Daptonema uncinatus Wieser, 1959
- Daptonema variasetosum Pavljuk, 1984
- Daptonema vicinum (Riemann, 1966)
- Daptonema vietnamensis (Gagarin & Thu, 2008) Venekey, Gheller, Maria, Brustolin, Kandratavicius, Vieira, Brito, Souza & Fonseca, 2014
- Daptonema voskresenskii Tchesunov, 1990
- Daptonema williamsi Vincx & Coomans, 1983
- Daptonema xyaliforme (Wieser & Hopper, 1967)
