= Diplolaimelloides =

Scientific classification
- Kingdom: Animalia
- Phylum: Nematoda
- Class: Chromadorea
- Order: Monhysterida
- Family: Monhysteridae
- Genus: Diplolaimelloides; Meyl, 1954

Genus of roundworms

Diplolaimelloides is a genus of free-living nematodes within the family Monhysteridae. The microscopic roundworms were first classified by A.H. Meyl in 1954 and are primarily found in aquatic environments of varying salinity, such as intertidal zones, brackish waters, salt lakes, and mangrove swamps. They play a role in benthic ecosystems as consumers of bacteria and organic particles.

== Species ==
Species:

- Diplolaimelloides altherri Meyl, 1954
- Diplolaimelloides bruciei Hopper, 1970
- Diplolaimelloides contortus Chen, Zhu & Guo, 2022
- Diplolaimelloides deconincki (Gerlach, 1951)
- Diplolaimelloides delyi Andrássy, 1958
- Diplolaimelloides elegans Gagarin & Thanh, 2008
- Diplolaimelloides islandicus (De Coninck, 1943) Meyl, 1954
- Diplolaimelloides longispicula Jacobs, 1987
- Diplolaimelloides meyli Timm, 1961
- Diplolaimelloides oschei Meyl, 1954
- Diplolaimelloides oscheri Meyl, 1954
- Diplolaimelloides palustris Tsalolikhin, 1985
- Diplolaimelloides rushikondai Sufyan, Mahamood, Singh & Ahmad, 2014
- Diplolaimelloides tehuelchus Pastor de Ward & Lo Russo, 2009
- Diplolaimelloides warwicki Pastor de Ward & Lo Russo, 2009
- Diplolaimelloides woaabi Jung, 2025
