= Amphimonhystera =

Scientific classification
- Domain: Eukaryota
- Kingdom: Animalia
- Phylum: Nematoda
- Class: Chromadorea
- Order: Monhysterida
- Family: Xyalidae
- Genus: Amphimonhystera; Allgén, 1929

Genus of worms

Amphimonhystera is a genus of nematodes belonging to the family Xyalidae.

The species of this genus are found in Europe and Southern America.

Species:

- Amphimonhystera anechma (Southern, 1914) Lorenzen, 1977
- Amphimonhystera bella Bussau, 1993
- Amphimonhystera circula Guo & Warwick, 2001
- Amphimonhystera galea Fadeeva, 1984
- Amphimonhystera marisalbi Tchesunov & Mokievsky, 2005
- Amphimonhystera molloyensis Tchesunov & Mokievsky, 2005
- Amphimonhystera pallida Tchesunov & Mokievsky, 2005
- Amphimonhystera parachnema Allgén, 1935
- Amphimonhystera paranechma Allgén, 1935
