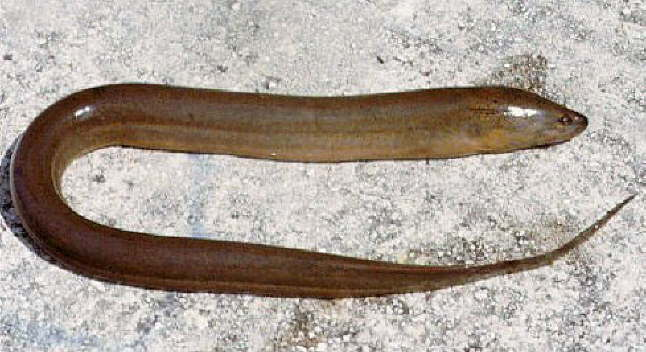

Conservation status
- Least Concern (IUCN 3.1)

Scientific classification
- Kingdom: Animalia
- Phylum: Chordata
- Class: Actinopterygii
- Division: Teleostei
- Order: Synbranchiformes
- Family: Synbranchidae
- Genus: Monopterus
- Species: M. albus

Binomial name
- Monopterus albus (Zuiew, 1793)

Synonyms
- Muraena alba Zuiew, 1793; Fluta alba (Zuiew, 1793); Synbranchus grammicus Cantor, 1842; Gymnotus albus Zuiew, 1789; Monopterus javanensis Lacépède, 1800; Unibranchapertura laevis Lacepède, 1803; Monopterus laevis (Lacepède, 1803); Ophicardia phayriana McClelland, 1844; Pneumabranchus cinereus McClelland, 1844; Monopterus cinereus (McClelland, 1844); Synbranchus xanthognathus Richardson, 1845; Monopterus xanthognathus (Richardson, 1845); Ophicardia xanthognatha (Richardson, 1845); Monopterus helvolus Richardson, 1846; Monopterus marmoratus Richardson, 1846; Apterigia saccogularis Basilewsky, 1855; Apterigia nigromaculata Basilewsky, 1855; Apterigia immaculata Basilewsky, 1855

= Asian swamp eel =

Species of fish

The Asian swamp eel (Monopterus albus), also known as rice eel, ricefield eel, rice paddy eel, or white rice-field eel, is a commercially important, air-breathing species of fish in the family Synbranchidae. It occurs in East and Southeast Asia, where it is commonly sold and eaten throughout the region. It has been introduced to two areas near the Everglades in Florida and near Atlanta, Georgia.

== Taxonomy ==
The Asian swamp eel is a freshwater, eel-like fish belonging to the family Synbranchidae (swamp eels). Some work indicates that the species should be split into three geographical clades or cryptic species, although these were not given systemic names, as the taxonomic synonymy was too complex to sort out at the time. The populations in the Ryukyus are distinct, the populations in China and Japan belong to another clade, and the rest, the original M. albus, belong to the third group. Although these groups are too phenotypically similar to tell apart morphologically, they exhibit different brooding behaviours. In the Japanese/Chinese form, the males wait until the fertilised eggs hatch in their foam nests, and then keep the larvae in their mouths until they can breathe their own air. The Ryukyuan populations also make foam nests, but do not keep the larvae in the somewhat narrow buccal cavities in their mouths. The most widespread clade does not make foam nests, but lays the eggs among the roots of floating plants and shows no parental care. Larvae use their pectoral fins to increase water flow and thus oxygen intake across their skin. This last form shows the most genetic diversity and may belong to numerous cryptic species. This form is also the type that has been introduced to the USA.

M. albus is not a "true" eel' in the order Anguilliformes; it belongs to the order Synbranchiformes.

== Description ==
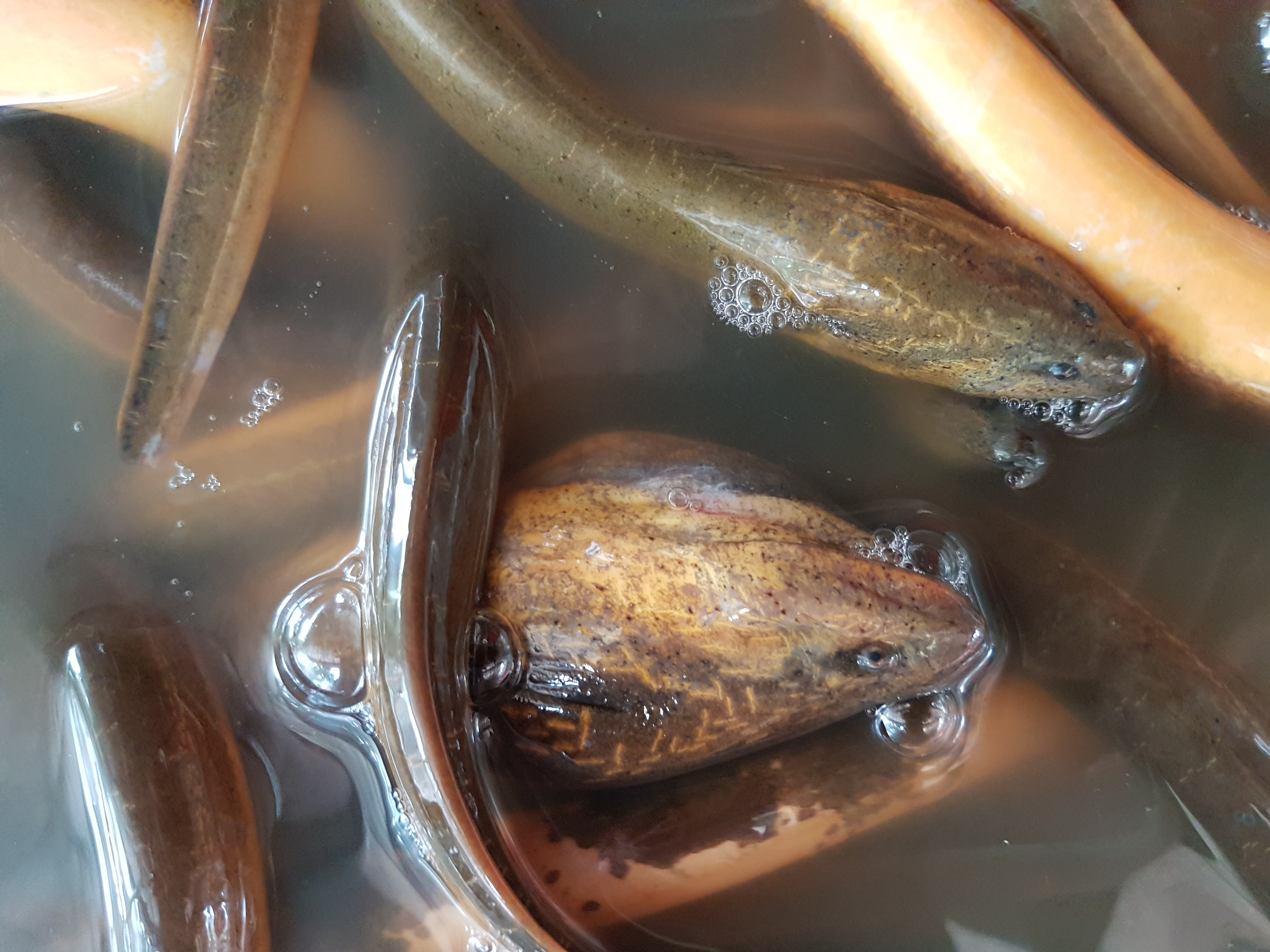
Monopterus albus at a restaurant in Mindanao, the Philippines

The Asian swamp eel has a scaleless, anguilliform body that grows to a meter or less, typically 25 to 40 cm as an adult. As a swamp eel, it has a tapering tail and blunt snout and lacks pectoral and pelvic fins. The dorsal, anal, and caudal fins are rudimentary, with the caudal fin often absent. These fins serve to protect the swamp eel against rolling and assist in sudden turns and stops. Its gill membranes are fused, but one V-shaped gill is located beneath the head. Such a shape prevents reverse flow.

Their color is variable, but generally olive or brown, with irregular dark flecks. Individuals in Florida usually have a dark body and head, with dark olive or brown dorsal coloring and light orange ventral coloring. Individuals caught in Florida can be more colourful, indicating breeding for the pet trade.

The mouth is large and protractile, and both upper and lower jaws have tiny teeth for eating fishes, worms, crustaceans, and other small, aquatic animals.

=== Similar species ===
M. cuchia, a related species also commonly eaten, has also been introduced to the USA. When it breathes, the throat expands on sides of head, as opposed to ventrally in M. albus. This species also has "suprapharyngeal air chambers", which M. albus does not, and a few scales, which are entirely absent in M. albus. M. cuchia has a single row of teeth, as opposed to two rows.

== Distribution ==
It has a wide distribution. Monopterus albus is native to much of East and Southeast Asia, ranging west as far as India. M. albus is native to the tropical and subtropical areas of northern India and Burma to China, Japan, and Indo-Malayan Archipelago, possible populations in Far East Russia and northeastern Australia might belong to different cryptic species. It is a common fish in India, Southern China to Malaysia and Indonesia.

The populations in most of Japan (Honshu and Kyushu) are likely introduced from China. The population in the Nara Basin was introduced from Korea in the beginning of the 20th century. Its distribution in Japan is discontinuous, which also indicates that it is introduced within the last millennium or so. The eels found in Taiwan appear to belong to two different species, a Japanese form was introduced in 1940, but a Southeast Asian form is also common and may have also been introduced or be native. The eels were first introduced to Oahu in the Hawaiian Islands around 1900, where they still occur. Earliest record of the fish in the Philippines is in 1918 from a collection by the Commercial Museum of Philadelphia where it has become an invasive species.

Locations in the Southeastern United States were not colonized until the end of the 20th century. Around 1990, the eels were introduced to several ponds at a nature center near Atlanta, Georgia, within the Chattahoochee River drainage basin; by 1994, individuals had migrated to an adjacent marsh, the Chattahoochee Nature Center north of Atlanta. Subsequently, eels were collected from Florida waters in 1997 at two widely separated areas, one in southeast and the other in west-central Florida. Tens of thousands of swamp eels are estimated to inhabit nearly 55 miles of two water canal systems in southern Florida, one in the North Miami area and another on the eastern side of Everglades National Park. Two other populations of the eels have been discovered since 1993, one outside of Tampa, Florida, and one in southern Georgia near the Chattahoochee River. One or more of the populations are believed to be the result of an intentional or accidental release of the creature from a home aquarium or fish farm. Some populations may have been the result of an attempt by a few local residents to establish the eels as a food source.

== Ecology ==
M. albus is a nocturnal animal. Its diet includes other fish, shrimp, crayfish, frogs, turtle eggs, aquatic invertebrates such as worms and insects, and occasionally detritus.

An old document from 1958 claimed M. albus is capable of moving over dry land, but many years of study found no evidence for this.

=== Habitat ===
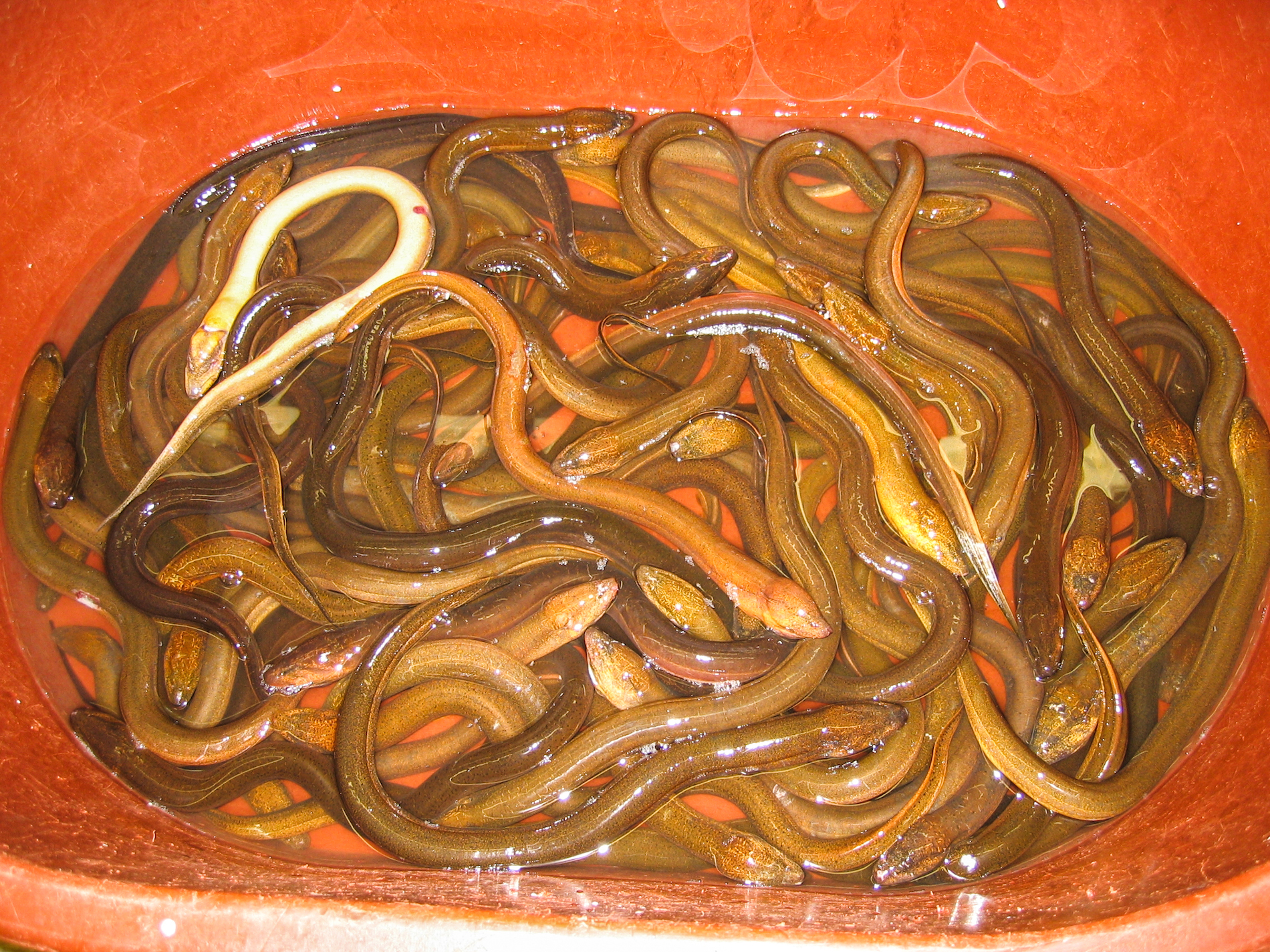
Introduced Asian swamp eels in Georgia in the United States

The preferred environment for the Asian swamp eel includes a wide variety of muddy, freshwater, shallow wetlands, such as rice paddies, ditches, ponds, marshes, streams, rivers, canals, lakes, and reservoirs. Depths less than 3 m are optimal. M. albus can live in a wide range of oxygen levels. This fish can obtain up to 25% oxygen from air transcutaneously if not using gills under water.

=== Lifecycle ===
The Asian swamp eel is sequentially hermaphroditic. All young are females. As juvenile fish begin to mature, some take on the masculine phenotype. Males are capable of changing sex, allowing them to replenish female populations when female densities are low. This change from one sex to another can take up to a year.

Spawning can occur throughout the year. Some Japanese and Chinese forms of M. albus exhibit a great deal of parental care. Large males construct bubble nests at the mouth of burrows and guard the eggs and young. In some Japanese and Chinese forms, eggs are laid in bubble nests located in shallow waters. These bubble nests float at the water's surface and are not attached to aquatic vegetation. Females produce up to 1,000 eggs, each, per spawning event.

=== Disease ===
Swamp eels are a host for the nematode Gnathostoma spinigerum. In Thailand and Vietnam, eating raw or undercooked swamp eel is the most common cause of gnathostomiasis, an uncommon parasitic disease.

== Uses ==
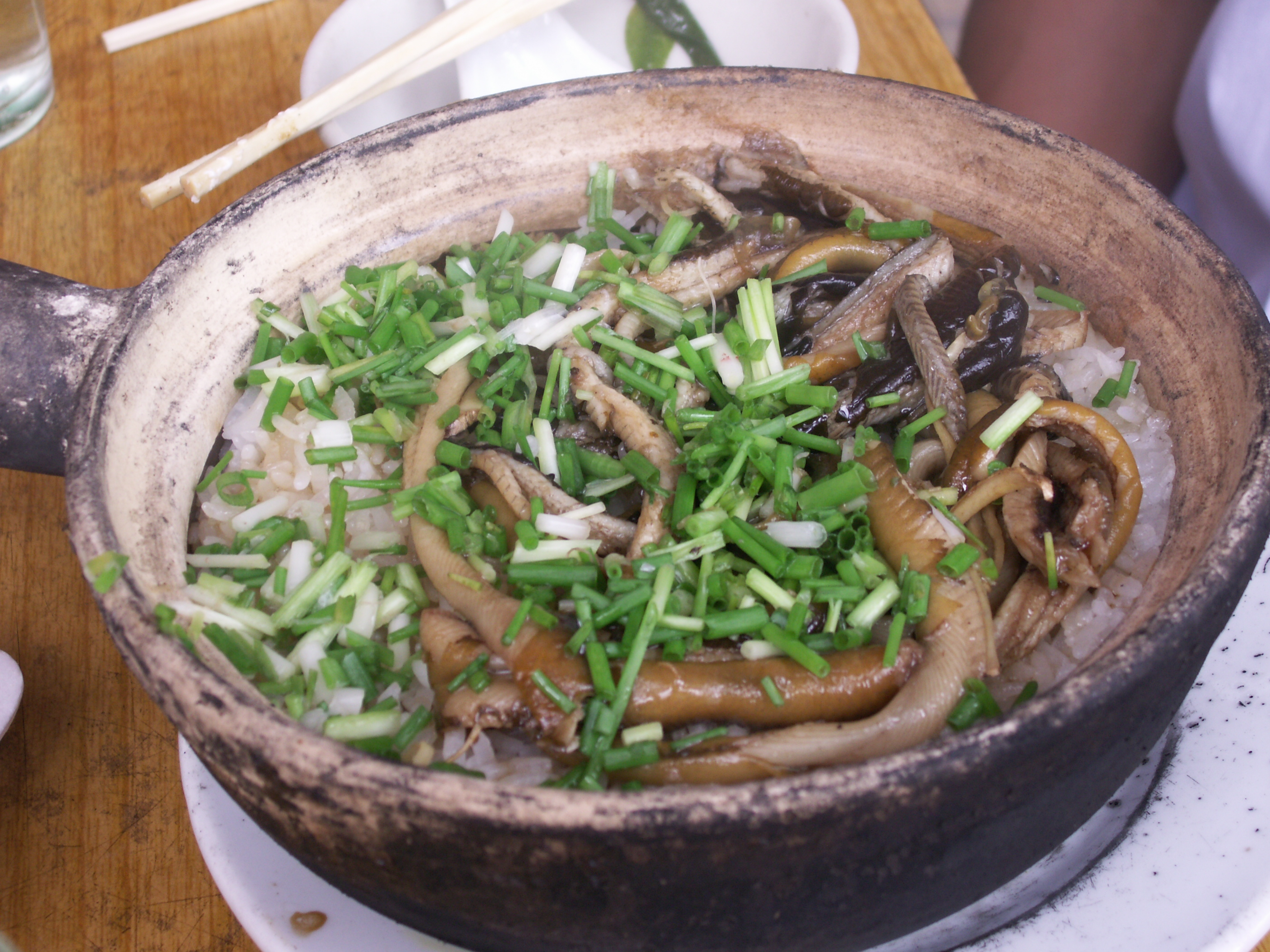
Dish of rice with swamp eel in China

The fish is an important protein source for people in Thailand. It is cultured throughout Vietnam. In Indonesia, Cambodia, China, Laos, Myanmar, Thailand, Vietnam, and other Asian countries, swamp eels are farmed in polyculture rice fields and sold as a food product with the rice crop.

In Balinese, the eels are known as lindung, they are sold dried in almost all village markets for use in Hindu offerings.

In Japan, it is known as ta-unagi, from 田, pronounced "ta", meaning paddy and 鰻, pronounced "unagi", meaning eel, usually written in katakana as タウナギ, and not commonly eaten.

In addition to being useful as a food, this species of eel is also often released into natural water resources in Thailand. According to the belief of the Thai people that it will help to end suffering and sorrow, or as a merit as releasing other fish or other aquatic animals such as climbing perch (Anabas testudineus), striped snakehead (Channa striata), Chinese edible frog (Hoplobatrachus rugulosus), pond snail (Filopaludina martensi), etc.

== Conservation ==
Asian swamp eels might pose a future threat to the environment of Everglades National Park, although preliminary studies reported no deleterious ecological effects in Florida. However, more recent studies in the Everglades do show several species faced precipitous declines after the introduction of swamp eels. Two crayfish became nearly absent from areas with swamp eels, and other species of fish also saw significant declines. The United States Geological Survey has used several methods to control the M. albus population here. They discourage catching and transporting the eel. Water-management structures near established swamp eel populations are not being opened to prevent or at least retard dispersal, particularly into the waters of the park. Adult and juvenile swamp eels are air-breathers, while young absorb oxygen directly through the skin. As such, standard fish poisons or piscicides (e.g., rotenone and antimycin A) that are transmitted across the gill membrane may not be effective. Serial pesticide dilutions of antimycin-A were tested and found to be innocuous. No changes in morbidity and mortality were observed. The fish in the United States likely originate from a different areas in Asia, and are slightly different in characteristics.
