= Gnathostoma spinigerum =

Scientific classification
- Kingdom: Animalia
- Phylum: Nematoda
- Class: Chromadorea
- Order: Rhabditida
- Family: Gnathostomatidae
- Genus: Gnathostoma
- Species: G. spinigerum

Binomial name
- Gnathostoma spinigerum Owen, 1836

Species of roundworm

Gnathostoma spinigerum is a parasitic nematode that causes gnathostomiasis in humans. Gnathostomiasis in animals can be serious or even fatal. The larval nematode is acquired by eating raw or undercooked fish and meat.

== Description ==
This species grows to a length of up to 54 mm (2.1 in), with females longer and wider on average than males. The pseudolips are tri-lobed. Eight to 11 rows of hooklets surround the head, with spines on the front half or two-thirds of the body. The spines closest to the head have three or four short points, followed by spines with three points, with the middle point longer than the lateral points, then progressively spines with two points and then just one, growing smaller further away from the head, until they disappear, leaving the last half or third of the body without spines.

== Life history ==
Gnathostoma spinigerum has a multiple-host life history. The eggs hatch in fresh water and the larvae are eaten by copepods of the order Cyclopoida. The copepods, in turn, are eaten by second intermediate hosts (fish and amphibians), which may be consumed, in turn, by paratenic or transport hosts (reptiles and birds). Eventually, the larvae end up in the stomachs of carnivores, usually cats and dogs. Humans may acquire the nematode larvae by consuming raw or undercooked meat from any of the intermediate or paratenic hosts. In carnivores, the larvae embed in the stomach wall and develop into adults. Embryos develop in eggs, which reach fresh water. In humans, the larvae commonly migrate to the skin, but may also move into various internal tissues. Larvae in humans may develop into immature adults, but never reach reproductive maturity.

== Hosts ==
Video showing movement of G. spinigerum larvae in a copepod.

Several species of copepods, including Cyclops varicans, Eucyclops agilis, Mesocyclops aspericornis, Mesocyclops leuckarti, and species of Thermocyclops, have been shown in experiments to be suitable first intermediate hosts of G. spinigreum larvae. As of 2011, no copepod collected in the wild had been found hosting Gnathostoma larvae. G. spinigerum second-stage larvae are ingested by copepods shortly after hatching. The larvae immediately lose their sheaths in the stomach of the copepod, and pass through the stomach wall into the body cavity, where they metamorphose into a stunted form. After 5-7 days in the copepod's body cavity, the larvae molt and become third-stage larvae.

In Thailand, 48 species of vertebrates are known to be natural second intermediate or paratenic hosts of G. spinigerum, including 20 fishes, two amphibians (frogs), 11 reptiles (nine snakes and two monitor lizards), 11 birds (including domesticated ducks and chickens), and four mammals. The most common intermediate or paratenic hosts in Thailand are Asian swamp eels, in terms of both the number of eels infected and the number of G. spinigerum larvae in an individual, with 2,582 larvae collected from a single eel. The larvae found in swamp eels are almost always encysted, with about half of the cysts in the liver and the other half in muscles.

The common definitive hosts of G. spinigerum are cats and dogs. Other known natural hosts include tigers, leopards, Asian golden cats, leopard cats, and jungle cats. About 1-7% of stray dogs and 2-8% of stray cats in Thailand have been found to be infested by G. spinigerum. Up to 10 adult worms have been found in one cat, while 72 adults were found in one dog. Adult worms in definitive hosts typically are embedded in the lining of the stomach, but a few (less than 1%), have been found embedded in the walls of the esophagus and duodenum of dogs.

== Geographic range ==
The first described case of gnathostomiasis was in a young tiger that died in the London Zoo in 1835.

Although G. spinigerum is considered endemic to Thailand, it is also found in many other countries of Southeast Asia. These nematode parasites have also been reported to be found in Japan and Australia. However, the incidence of infection is rarer outside the Asian continent.

== Habitat ==
G. spinigerum normally can be found in wet tropical environments. Larvae can infect many classes of animals. Canine and feline species, and possibly pigs, are determined as the definitive hosts. In Japan, freshwater fishes, Ophicephalus argus and O. tadianus, are the most important vectors of human gnathostomiasis. In addition to freshwater fishes, domestic duck, Anas platyrhynchus, and the domestic chicken, Gallus gallus domesticus, carry the parasite in Thailand. In Japan, natural hosts of G. spinigerum include 32 species of animals.

== Infectivity ==
Encysted larvae can survive various methods of preparing food, creating a risk of being infected by eating fish or other meat that has not been properly cooked. Measured survival times for encysted larvae are 25 days in fermented fish, 8-9 days in 28 to 35% alcohol, 8 days in minced meat salads, 8 days in vinegar (4% acid), 6 days in syrup (20% sugar), 5 days in lime juice, 1-2 days at -4 °C, 20 hours in brine (30% salt), and 18 hours in fish sauce (23% salt). Live adults in fish muscles are killed by immersion in boiling water for at least 5 minutes.

== Prevention of gnathostomiasis ==
In a study done in Thailand, researchers have proposed a method of prevention of gnathostomiasis in humans who become infected by eating freshwater fish. For example, a popular dish serving fermented freshwater fish is popular among the women of Thailand, which may explain their higher incidence of the infection. Tto avoid or kill the infective larva living in fish muscle, one must boil the fish first for a minimum of 5 minutes, placed in a solution of vinegar (4% acetic acid) for a period of 5.5 hours, or just to avoid raw or undercooked fish, always being sure to cook freshwater fish thoroughly.

== Treatment of gnathostomiasis ==
Laboratory testing on mice treated once or twice daily with albendazole were shown to have a significant reduction in worm count when compared to the untreated mice group. The effective dosage at which albendazole has been shown effective is 90 mg/kg twice a day for 21 straight days, but other antihelminthic drugs are available, such as bithionol, thiabendazole, metronidazole, and others, that did not reveal any significant therapeutic effects in experimental G. spinigerum infections.

== See also ==
- List of parasites (human)
