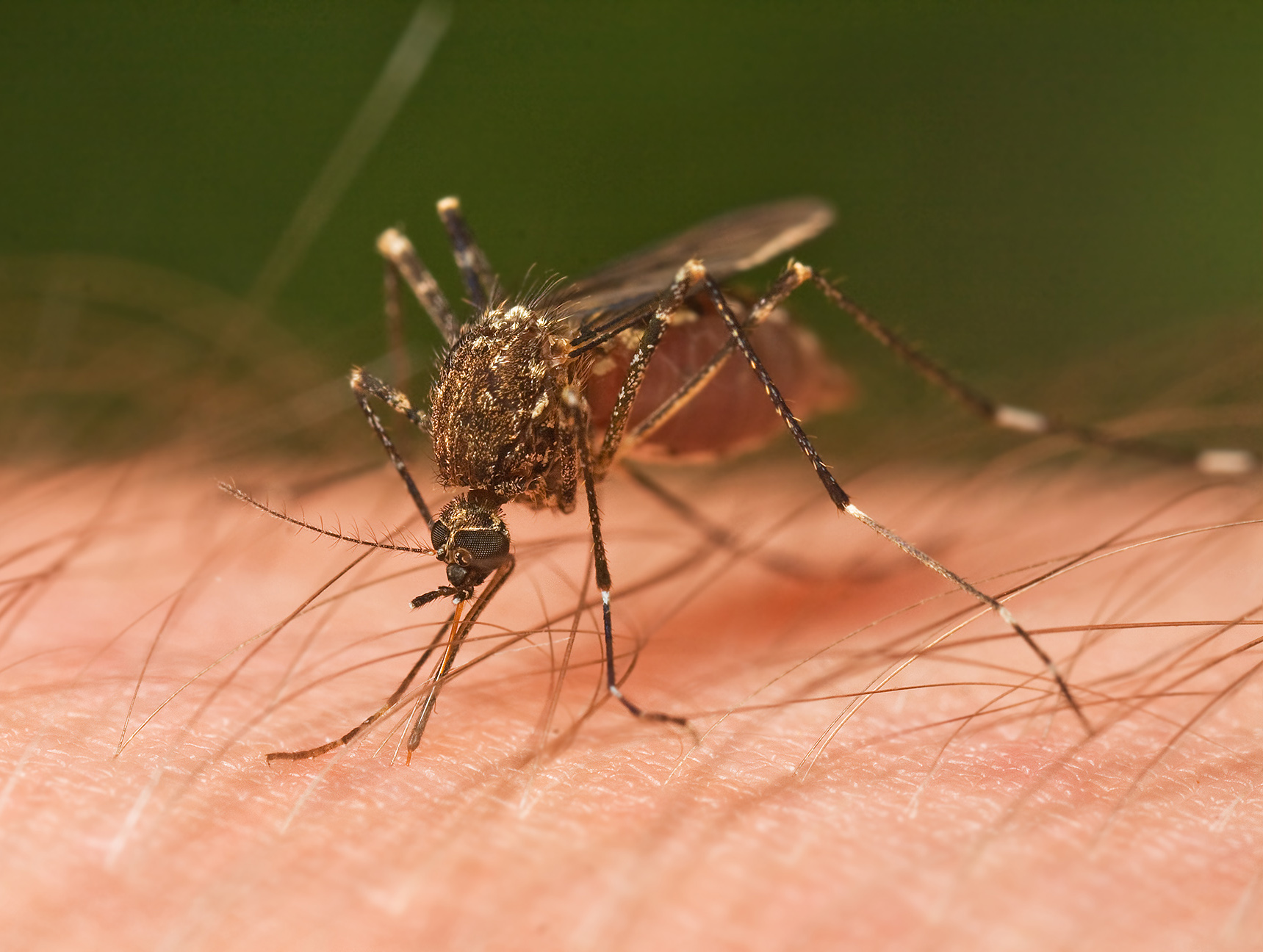

Scientific classification
- Kingdom: Animalia
- Phylum: Arthropoda
- Clade: Pancrustacea
- Class: Insecta
- Order: Diptera
- Family: Culicidae
- Genus: Aedes
- Subgenus: Rampamyia
- Species: A. notoscriptus

Binomial name
- Aedes notoscriptus (Skuse, 1889)

Synonyms
- Ochlerotatus notoscriptus

= Aedes notoscriptus =

Species of mosquito

Aedes notoscriptus is a species of mosquito found in Australia, New Zealand, the southwestern Pacific islands, and Southern California.
