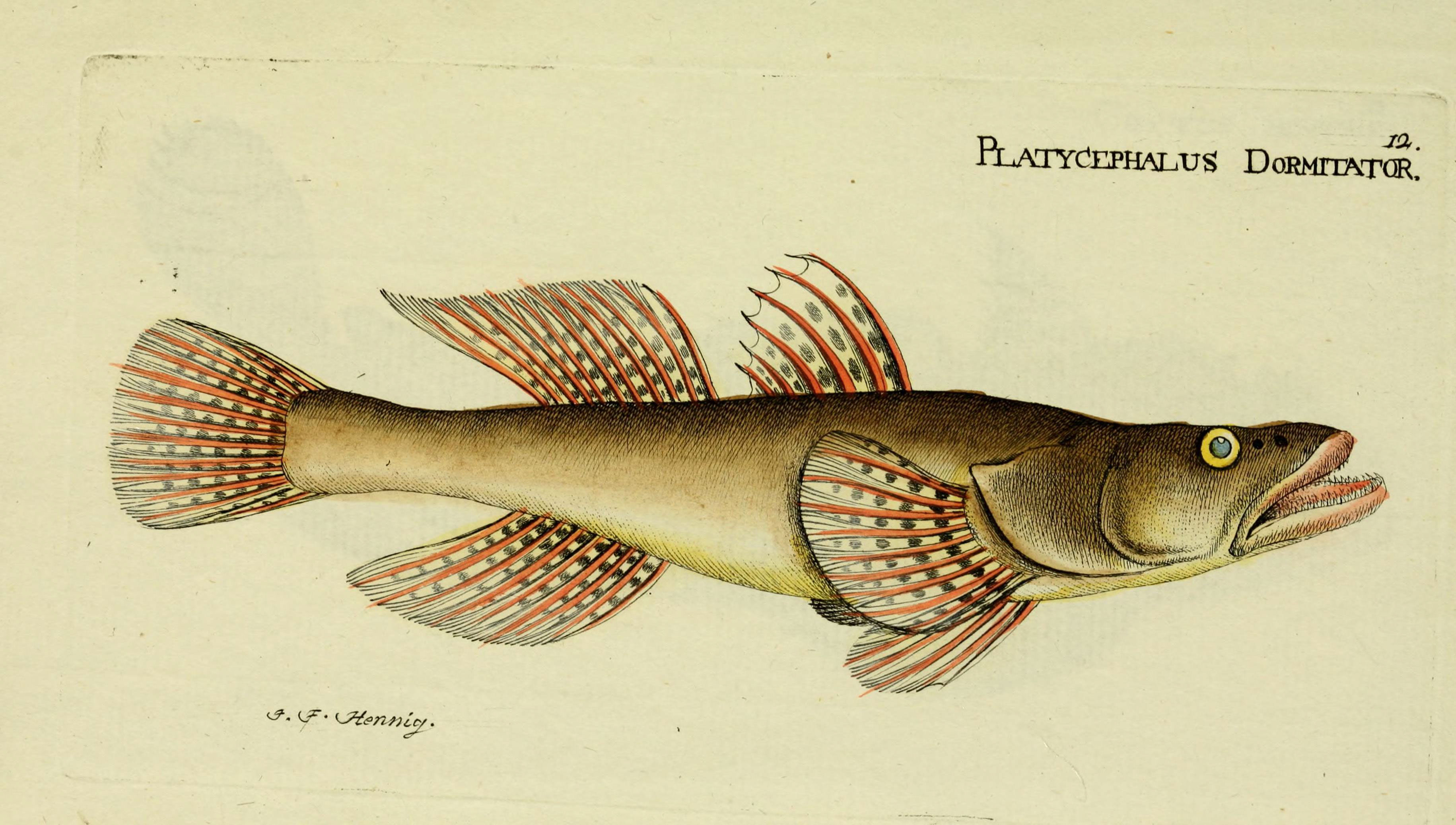
- Gobiomorus dormitor

Scientific classification
- Kingdom: Animalia
- Phylum: Chordata
- Class: Actinopterygii
- Division: Teleostei
- Order: Gobiiformes
- Family: Eleotridae
- Genus: Gobiomorus; Lacépède, 1800

Type species
- Gobiomorus dormitor Lacépède, 1800

= Gobiomorus =

Genus of fishes

Gobiomorus is a genus of fishes in the family Eleotridae native to marine, fresh and brackish waters along the Pacific and Atlantic coasts of the Americas.

== Species ==
The recognized species in this genus are:

- Gobiomorus dormitor Lacépède, 1800 (bigmouth sleeper)
- Gobiomorus maculatus (Günther, 1859) (Pacific sleeper)
- Gobiomorus polylepis Ginsburg, 1953 (finescale sleeper)
