= Amphid =

Structure in nematode anatomy

Amphids (Greek: amphi, around, double) are innervated invaginations of cuticle in nematodes. They are usually found in the anterior (head) region of the animal, at the base of the lips. Amphids are the principal olfactosensory organs of nematodes. Each amphid in C. elegans is made up of 12 sensory neurons with ciliated dendrites. The neurons have multiple shapes, such as single cilium, double cilia, wing-like cilia, and dendrites embedded in the sheath-cell with villa. Other nematodes, such as Bursaphelenchus xylophilus, have different configurations of specific types of neurons, with B. xylophilus’ amphids having 13 neurons rather than 12.
