= Spicule (nematode anatomy) =

Mating structure in nematodes

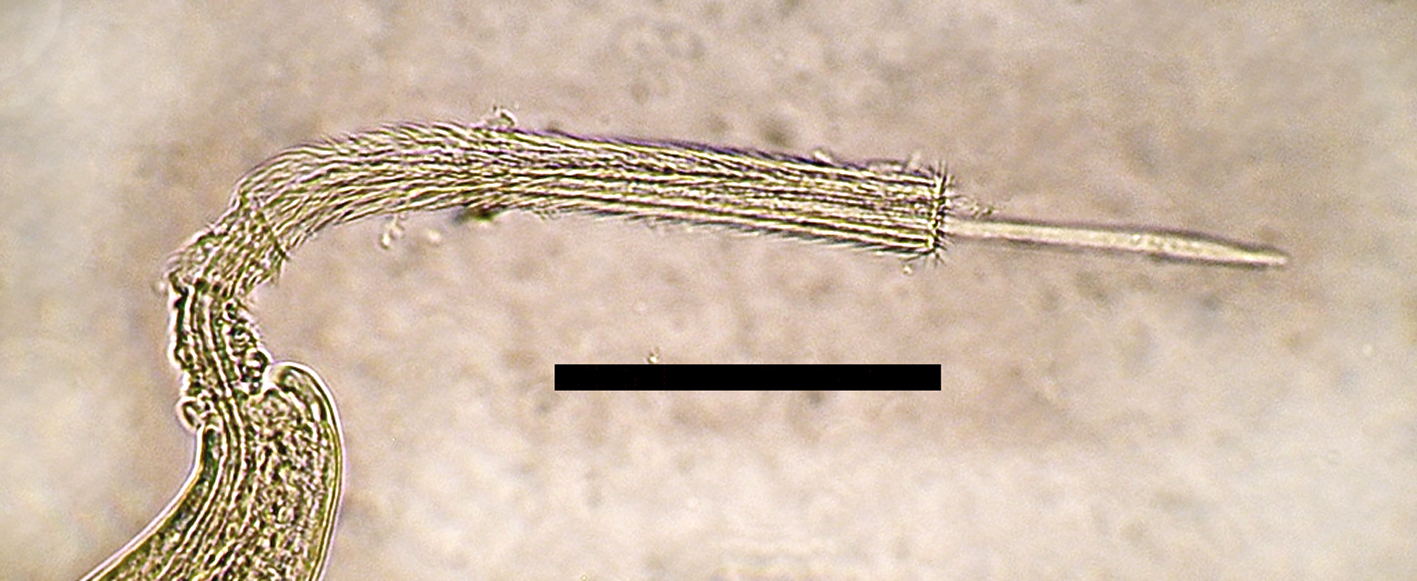
Spicule protruding from the spicular sheath at the posterior end of a male Eucoleus aerophilus

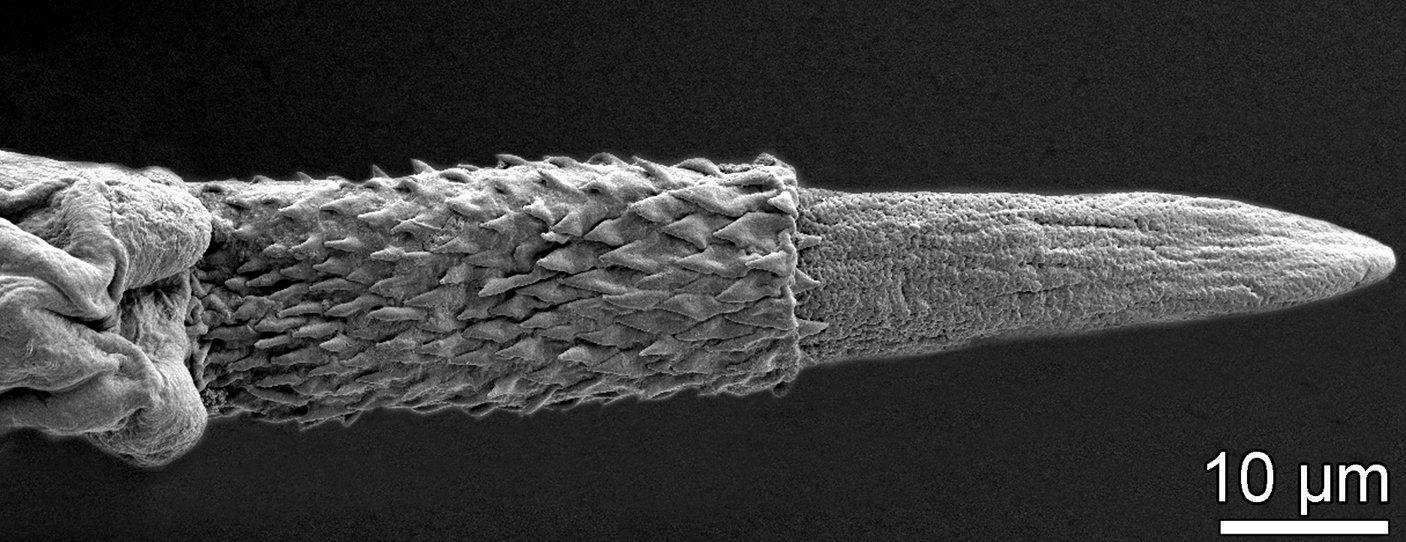
Male caudal end of Capillaria plectropomi, with spinose spicular sheath and extruded spicule. Scanning electron microscopy.

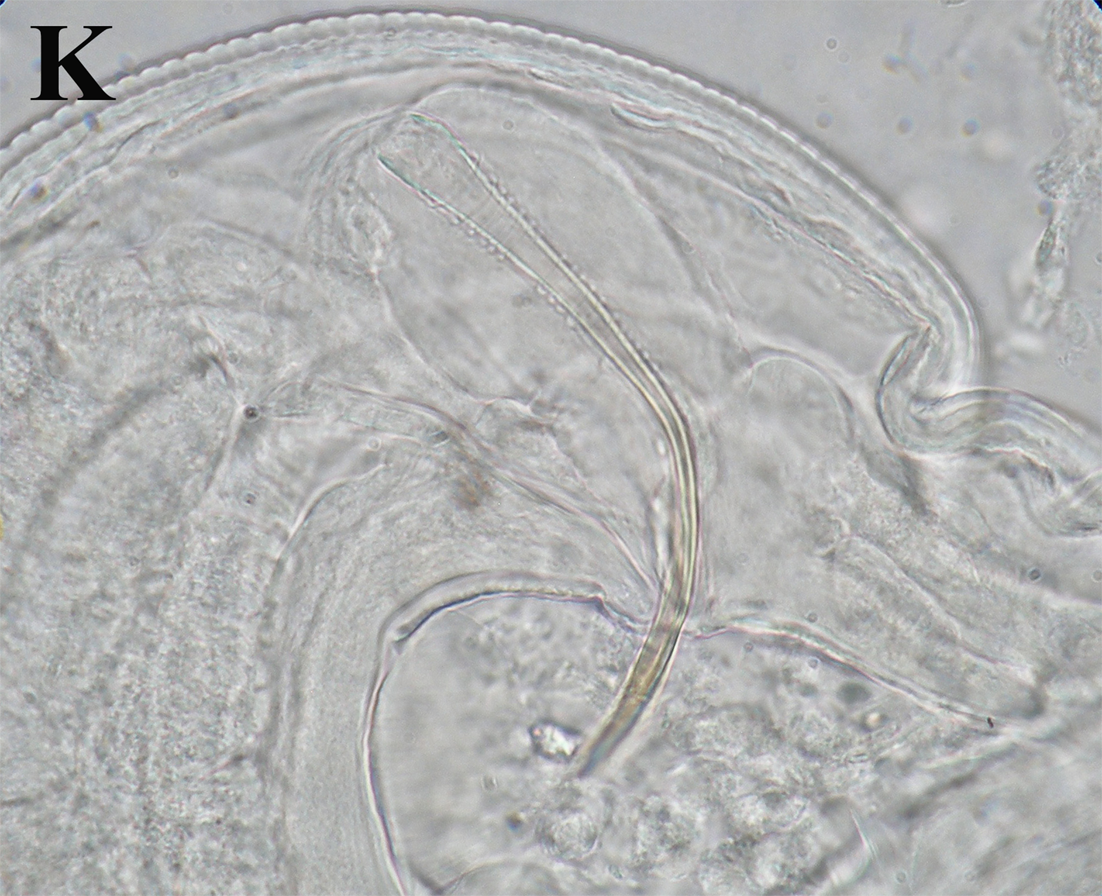
Left spicule in a male Pterygodermatites baiomydis

In nematodes, spicules, also known as copulatory spicules, are needle-like mating structures found only in males.

Male nematodes may have one or two spicules which serve to open the vulva of females and facilitate the transmission of sperm, although sperm is not transferred directly by or through the spicules. The gubernaculum is another organ of the nematode male copulatory system which guides the spicules during copulation.
