= Gnathostomatidae =

Scientific classification
- Kingdom: Animalia
- Phylum: Nematoda
- Class: Chromadorea
- Order: Rhabditida
- Suborder: Spirurida
- Family: Gnathostomatidae; Railliet, 1895

Synonyms
- Ancyracanthidae

Family of roundworms

Gnathostomatidae is a family of nematodes belonging to the order Spirurida.

Genera:

- Ancyracanthus Diesing, 1839
- Echinocephalus Molin, 1858
- Gnathostoma Owen, 1836
- Mooleptus Özdikmen, 2010
- Spiroxys Schneider, 1866
- Tanqua Blanchard, 1904
