= List of Chulalongkorn University people =

The following is a list of notable alumni, non-graduates, lecturers, professors and administrators affiliated with Chulalongkorn University

== Royalty and nobility ==
Name	Class year	Notability	Reference(s)
Mahidol Adulyadej, Prince of Songkla	Lecturer	Member of the House of Chakri; son of King Chulalongkorn of Siam; father of King Ananda Mahidol and King Bhumibol Adulyadej of Thailand	
Chudadhuj Dharadilok, Prince of Bejrapurana	Lecturer	Member of the House of Chakri, of Siam (now Thailand); son of King Chulalongkorn and Queen Saovabha Phongsri of Thailand	
Rangsit Prayurasakdi, Prince of Chai Nat	Lecturer	Member of the House of Chakri, of Siam (now Thailand); son of King Chulalongkorn	
Galyani Vadhana, Princess of Naradhiwas	Lecturer	Elder sister of King Ananda Mahidol and King Bhumibol Adulyadej; granddaughter of King Chulalongkorn	
Maha Chakri Sirindhorn, Princess Royal	B.A. History (1973); M.A. Pali-Sanskrit (1979)	Second daughter of King Bhumibol Adulyadej of Thailand; received the Ramon Magsaysay Award (1991), Indira Gandhi Prize (2004)	
Princess Sirivannavari Nariratana	B.F.A. Fashion design (2005)	Second daughter of Crown Prince Maha Vajiralongkorn of Thailand; 16th on the list of the "20 Hottest Young Royals" compiled by Forbes	
Vanna Vaidhayakara, Prince Naradhip Bongsprabandh	Lecturer	Member of the House of Chakri, of Thailand; son of Worawannakon, Prince Narathip Praphanphong; grandson of King Mongkut	
Prince Prem Purachatra	Lecturer	Member of the House of Chakri, of Thailand; son of Purachatra Jayakara, Prince of Kamphaengphet; grandson of King Chulalongkorn	
Prince Subhadradis Diskul	B.A. History	Member of the House of Chakri, of Thailand; son of Tisavarakumarn, Prince Damrong Rajanubhab; grandson of King Mongkut	
H.E. M.R.Seni Pramoj	Lecturer	Son of Prince Karob; great-grandson of King Rama II; 6th prime minister of Thailand	
H.E. M.R.Sukhumbhand Paribatra	Lecturer	Son of Prince Sukhumabhinanda; great-grandson of King Chulalongkorn; 15th Governor of Bangkok	
The Hon. M.L.Pin Malakul	Lecturer	Son of Chaophraya Phrasadet Surentharathibodi; great-great-grandson of King Rama II and Princess Kunthon Thipphayawadi; Former Minister of Education and Minister of Culture; National Artist in Literature (1987) and ASEAN Award in Literature (1992)	
The Hon. M.L.Chirayu Navawongs	B.A. Thai language (1932)	Great-great-grandson of King Mongkut, scholar and former privy councillor	
The Hon. M.L.Piyapas Bhirombhakdi	B.A. History	Great-great-granddaughter of King Mongkut, actress	
Dhasanawalaya Sornsongkram	B.A. French language	The only daughter of Galyani Vadhana, Princess of Naradhiwas; niece of King Bhumibol Adulyadej	

== Public Servants ==
Name	Class year	Notability	Reference(s)
Nilawan Pintong	B.A. Modern Languages (1934)	Ramon Magsaysay Award for Public Service in 1961, founder of Satri Sarn Magazine, and Ounakorn Center	
Nidhi Eoseewong	B.A. History; M.A. History	Historian, writer, and political commentator with the Outstanding Research Award from the National Research Council of Thailand, the Siburapha Award, and the Fukuoka Asian Culture Prize	
Poonsapaya Navawongs na Ayudhya	B.A. (1932)	Honorary Royal Master	

== Art, architecture, and engineering ==
Name	Class year	Notability	Reference(s)
Kulapat Yantrasast	B.Arch.	Thai architecture	
Pinyo Suwankiri	B.Arch. (1964)	Thailand National Artist in the area of applied arts (Thai architecture)	

== Business ==
Name	Class year	Notability	Reference(s)
Aliza Napartivaumnuay	B. Bus. Admin.	Thai social and business innovator	

== Law and politics ==
Name	Class year	Notability	Reference(s)
Bhichit Rattakul	B.Sc.	12th Governor of Bangkok	
Chit Phumisak	B.A.	Author, philologist, historian, poet and Communist rebel	
Chitpas Kridakorn	M.A. in Political science	Politician of the Democrat Party who has been a member of the Thai House of Representatives since 2019	
Chuwit Chitsakul	B.Acc.	Represented Phrae twice in the House of Representatives of Thailand	
Kalaya Sophonpanich	B.Sc. (1965)	Former Minister of Science and Technology	
Kanchana Silpa-archa	B.Sc. Statistics	Leader of the Chartthaipattana Party and former Deputy Minister of Education	
Nahathai Thewphaingarm	B.Ed. English language	Former Member of the House of Representatives, Bangkok and former Deputy Spokesman of the Prime Minister's Office	
Naraporn Chan-o-cha	Lecturer	Spouse of Prayut Chan-o-cha, the 29th prime minister of Thailand	
Narumon Pinyosinwat	B.Sc. Applied Mathematics	Deputy Minister of Labour and former government spokesperson	
Nualphan Lamsam	B.B.A. Marketing	Former Assistant Secretary-General of Democrat Party and chairwoman of Port Football Club	
Pavin Chachavalpongpun	B.A. International relations	Political activist for democracy, scholar, associate professor and political exile	
Sudarat Keyuraphan	B.B.A., M.B.A.	Politician; deputy leader of the Thai Rak Thai party	
Surakiart Sathirathai	LL.B	Former Deputy Prime Minister of Thailand Foreign Affairs, Education and Culture; Thailand's candidate for United Nations Secretary-General in 2006	
Thanathorn Juangroongruangkit	M.A. Political economy	Former leader of the Future Forward Party	
Wijit Srisa-arn	B.A. Linguistics (1955)	Minister of Education in 2006	
Wissanu Krea-ngam	Lecturer	Deputy Prime Minister of Thailand	

== Literature ==
Name	Class year	Notability	Reference(s)
Anchalee Vivatanachai	B.A. Thai language (1969)	Writer under the pen name Anchan, winner of the S.E.A. Write Award	
Chetana Nagavajara	B.A.	Literary critic with Goethe Medal and Bundesverdienstkreuz (First Class)	
Supa Sirisingh	B.A. (1962)	Writer under the pseudonym Botan	
Vinita Diteeyont	B.A. English language (1966)	National Artist of Literature; writer under the pen names V. Vinichayakul (Note: Also spelled V. Vinitchaikul, Vor Vinitchaikul, Wor Winichaikul, etc. RTGS: Wo Winitchaikun) and Kaew Kao	
Win Lyovarin	B.Arch. (1975)	Writer, two-time winner of the S.E.A. Write Award	

== Film, theater, and television ==
Name	Class year	Notability	Reference(s)
Alexander Rendell	B.A. Communication management	Model and actor	
Artiwara Kongmalai	LL.B.	Singer	
Atsadawut Luengsuntorn	B.Ed. Visual arts education	Model, producer and actor	
Banjong Pisanthanakun	B.A. Filming	Producer	
ฺButsakorn Hongmanop	B.B.A. Marketing	Model, actress and television host	
Chaiyapol Julien Poupart	B.Sc. Sports Management	Model and actor	
Chantavit Dhanasevi	B.A. (1973)	Model, actor and screenwriter	
Charm Osathanond	B.A. (2009)	Miss Thailand Universe 2006, model and actress	
Chotika Wongwilas	M.Sc. Management of Recreation and Tourism	Model and actress	
Chookiat Sakveerakul	B.A. Filming	Producer	
Chutavuth Pattarakampol	ฺB.B.A. Finance	Model and actor	
Dhanundhorn Neerasingh	B.B.A. Banking and Finance	Model and singer	
Jira Maligool	B.A. Filming	Producer	
Kawee Tanjararak	B.E. Mechanical engineering M.B.A. Business administration	Model, actor and singer	
Lapat Ngamchaweng	B.A.	Model, actor and singer	
Narikun Ketprapakorn	M.D.	Model and actress	
Natapohn Tameeruks	B.Arch.	Model and actress	
Nawapol Thamrongrattanarit	B.A. Chinese language (2002)	Producer	
Niti Chaichitathorn	B.A. Pali-Sanskrit; M.A. Mass communication	Television host, creative, producer and actor	
Nithiwat Tharathorn	B.A. Filming	Producer	
Orn-anong Panyawong	B.F.A.	Miss Thailand 1992 and actress	
Pachara Chirathivat	B.B.A.	Actor	
Pakorn Chatborirak	Pharm.D.	Model and actor	
Panu Chiragun	B.Sc. Architectural Design	Model and singer	
Paris Intarakomalyasut	B.A.	Model, actor and singer	
Pimprapa Tangprabhaporn	B.Arch. Communication design	Model, actress and singer	
Phuwin Tangsakyuen	B.E. Engineering	Actor, Model, Singer-Songwriter, and Voice Actor	
Pornpawee Neerasingh	B.A. Public administration	Model and singer	
Sahaphap Wongratch	D.V.M.	Model, actor and singer	
Siriyakorn Pukkavesh	B.A. Advertising	Actress, model, presenter, designer and magazine publisher	
Songyos Sugmakanan	B.A. Filming	Producer	
Suppasit Jongcheveevat	M.E. Industrial engineering Ph.D. Industrial engineering	Model and actor	
Sutatta Udomsilp	B.A. Communication management	Model and actress	
Taksaorn Paksukcharern	B.A. Advertising	Model and actress	
Tawan Vihokratana	B.A.	Model, actor and television host	
Thitima Suttasunthorn	B.A. Advertising	Singer	
Thitipoom Techaapaikhun	B.E. Electrical engineering M.B.A. Business administration	Model, actor and television host	
Urassaya Sperbund	B.A. Language and Culture	Model and actress	
Violette Wautier	B.A.	Singer, songwriter, actress, and model	
Waruntorn Paonil	B.F.A. Classical chorus	Model, actress and singer	
Way-Ar Sangngern	B.A.	Model and actor	

== Science, technology, medicine, and mathematics ==
Name	Class year	Notability	Reference(s)
Therdchai Jivacate	M.D. (1965)	Awarded the Ramon Magsaysay Award for Public Service in 2008	

== Faculty ==
Professors who are also Chulalongkorn alumni are listed in italics.

Name	Class year	Notability	Reference(s)
Chai-Anan Samudavanija	Professor of political science	Political scientist; director of Vajiravudh College; president of the Royal Institute; former judge of the Constitutional Court	
Kritsada Arunwong na Ayutthaya	Professor emeritus	Professor; 4th Dean of Faculty of Architecture at Chulalongkorn University; 11th Governor of Bangkok	
Sodsai Pantoomkomol	B.A. (1956)	Actress; associate professor at the Faculty of Arts of Chulalongkorn University	
Sukhumbhand Paribatra	Associate Professor of political science	15th Governor of Bangkok	
Vitit Muntarbhorn	Professor of Law	International human rights expert	
Winai Dahlan	B.Sc. (1976)	Founder Director of the Halal Science Center, Chulalongkorn University	
Yong Poovorawan	M.D.	Scientist in the fields of pediatric hepatology, viral hepatitis and virology; expert on the H5N1 avian influenza virus	
