= Poonsapaya Navawongs na Ayudhya =

Thai educator

Thanphuying Poonsapaya Navawongs na Ayudhya
- Portrait with honorary PhD gown, 1968
- Born: Nu (Geyer); 12 October 1910
- Died: 23 October 2015 (aged 105)
- Other name: Poonsapaya Kraiyong
- Education: Chulalongkorn University; University of Michigan
- Occupation: Professor in education
- Years active: 1932–1971
- Organization: Chulalongkorn University
- Known for: Establishing the Faculty of Education
- Spouse: Chirayu Navawongs

Thanphuying Poonsapaya Navawongs na Ayudhya (Thai: พูนทรัพย์ นพวงศ์ ณ อยุธยา, (Note: RTGS: Phunsap Nopphawong na Ayutthaya, Thai pronunciation: [pʰūːn.sáp nóp.pʰa.wōŋ náʔ a.jút.tʰa.jāː].) also spelled Poonsap Noppawong; 12 October 1910 – 23 October 2015) was a Thai educator. She was a professor at Chulalongkorn University, where she founded the Faculty of Education and was its first dean, and contributed extensively to the development of teacher education and education administration in Thailand. She has been recognized as one of the foremost contributors to education in the country.

== Early life ==
Poonsapaya was born on 12 October 1910 in tambon Si Kak Phraya Si (now in Bangkok's Phra Nakhon District). She was originally named Nu (หนู). (Note: Thai pronunciation: [nǔː].) Her father, Hans Geyer, was a German expatriate jeweller who had frequent contact with the royal ladies in Phayathai Palace; her mother Mrs Chiam was a lady-in-waiting of Suan Sunanda Palace. At the age of three-and-a-half, her parents presented her to Queen Saovabha Phongsri, who gave her the name Poonsapaya, and placed her under the care of Princess Valaya Alongkorn. (Poonsapaya would later adopt the Thai-icized surname Kraiyong (ไกรยง). (Note: Thai pronunciation: [krāj.jōŋ].))

She grew up in the palace, and attended Rajini School. She graduated from the Faculty of Arts and Science at Chulalongkorn University and joined the civil service, before earning a scholarship for a master's degree in education psychology at the University of Michigan. She had begun a doctorate at the University of Wisconsin–Madison when Thailand joined World War II against the United States. The government ordered her return, but she decided to join the Free Thai resistance movement as a radio broadcaster assisting the Allies instead.

== Career ==
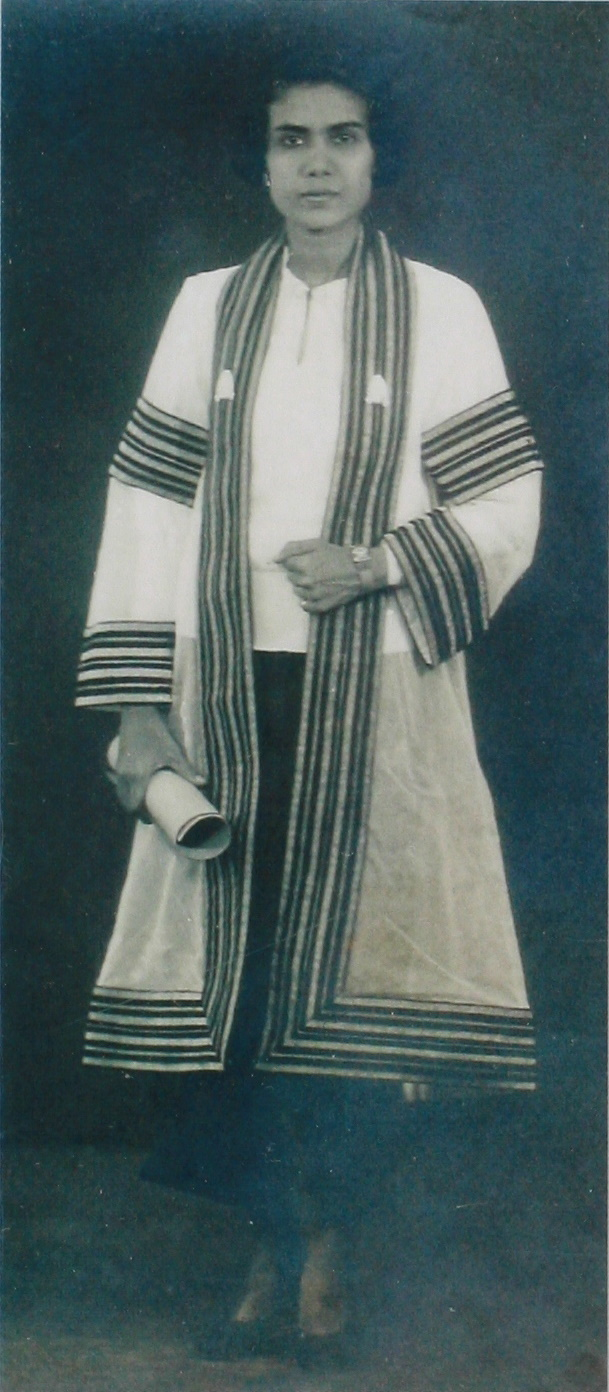
Poonsapaya worked at Chulalongkorn University, the alma mater from which she graduated in 1931.

After the war, Poonsapaya briefly audited at Columbia University before returning to Thailand. (She would later receive a graduate diploma in education administration from Columbia in 1963.) She then began working at Chulalongkorn University. At the time, the university's teacher training programme was a department under the Faculty of Arts and Sciences (now the Faculty of Arts), teaching a one-year course. Poonsapaya pushed for its expansion into a two-year programme, and later worked to establish a full faculty. The Faculty of Education was founded in 1957. Poonsapaya served as its dean—the first woman in Thailand to hold such a position—until her retirement fourteen years later, after which she continued teaching as professor emeritus. She introduced new theories and processes, including seminar classes and the course credit system. The Chulalongkorn University Demonstration School was also established for teacher training and education research under her leadership.

== Personal life and recognition ==
Poonsapaya also worked toward the advancement of women. She founded the Thailand chapter of Zonta International, as well as the Thai Association of University Women. She and her husband, Mom Luang Chirayu Navawongs, whom she married in 1952, also contributed to various other charitable causes (they had no children). Following her husband's death in 2003, she donated their residence to serve as a learning centre. It is now known as the Chirayu–Poonsapaya Museum and Discovery Learning Library.

Poonsapaya's health deteriorated following a stroke around 2012. She died of leukaemia on 23 October 2015, aged 105, at King Chulalongkorn Memorial Hospital. Her cremation on 5 June 2016 was presided over by Princess Sirindhorn.

Poonsapaya received multiple honours and awards for her work. She was appointed Dame Grand Commander of the Order of Chula Chom Klao in 1986, granting her the title Thanphuying. Chulalongkorn University named her its first Venerable Professor in 1990. The Teachers' Council honoured her as an exceptional contributor to national education in 1992. The National Identity Commission named her National Outstanding Person in 2003. In 2009, she was made an Honorary Fellow of the Royal Society, and named a National Senior Citizen by the National Older Persons Commission.
