= Jirayu =

Jirayu (Thai: จิรายุ, RTGS: Chirayu, from Pali: cira + āyu, is a Thai given name. People with this name include:

- Chirayu Isarangkun Na Ayuthaya, Thai economist and court official
- Chirayu Navawongs, Thai scholar and privy council member
- Jirayu La-ongmanee, Thai actor
- Jirayu Tangsrisuk, Thai actor
- Jirayu Raksakaew, Thai volleyball player
