= Winai Dahlan =

Thai scientist

- วินัย ดะห์ลัน
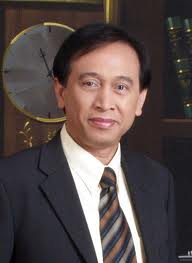
- Born: 7 January 1952 (age 74)
- Education: Chulalongkorn University; Mahidol University; Université libre de Bruxelles
- Known for: founding Halal Science Center
- Scientific career
- Fields: Nutrition science; lipidology
- Workplaces: Chulalongkorn University

Winai Dahlan (Thai: วินัย ดะห์ลัน, RTGS: Winai Dalan; born 7 January 1952) is a Thai scientist and founder-director of the Halal Science Center Chulalongkorn University. He is also the Head of The Lipid and Fat Science Research as well as International Graduate Program Chair in Food and Nutrition, Faculty of Allied Health Sciences, Chulalongkorn University.

Dahlan was born to parents of Javanese descent in Bangkok. His father is Irfan Dahlan and his mother is Zahrah. His grandfather is Ahmad Dahlan. He has more than 30 articles published and has been listed as one of “The World's 500 Most Influential Muslims" for 14 consecutive years as compiled by the Royal Islamic Strategic Studies Centre and the only Thai Muslim Scientist ranked in “The World's 16 most Influential Muslim Scientists” in Science and Technology.

== Education ==
- Doctor of Philosophy in Applied Medical Biology (with highest distinction), Faculty of Medicine and Pharmacy, St-Pierre Hospital, Université libre de Bruxelles, Brussels, Belgium, 1989
- M.S. Nutrition, Faculty of Medicine Ramathibodi Hospital, Mahidol University, Bangkok, Thailand, 1982
- B.Sc. Biochemistry, Faculty of Science, Chulalongkorn University, Bangkok, Thailand, 1976

== Career ==
- Lecturer, Chulalongkorn University, 1993–present
- Founding Director, The Halal Science Center, Chulalongkorn University, 2004–present
- Vice President, The Central Islamic Council of Thailand (CICOT), 2013–present
- Chairman, The Halal Standard Institute of Thailand (HSIT), 2014–present
- Member, The National Reform Committee on Social, 2017–present
- Member, Thailand Halal Task Force (Ministry of Agriculture and Cooperatives), 2022
- Member, Committee of Muslim-friendly tourism promotion (Ministry of Tourism and Sports), 2022
