= Faculties of Chulalongkorn University =

Chulalongkorn University in Thailand comprises nineteen constituent faculties, as well as six schools and colleges, which form the university's teaching units. Together, they offer 76 undergraduate and 375 postgraduate programmes, and (as of the 2018 academic year) host the university's 25,940 undergraduate and 11,424 postgraduate students. Each of the faculties is focused on a specific subject area. All undergraduate and most postgraduate students will apply for a programme of study under a specific faculty, and will belong with that faculty throughout the duration of their studies.

The university was established in 1917 with four original faculties: Medicine, Public Administration, Engineering, and Arts and Science. Of the four, only the faculties of Engineering and of Arts and Science remain with the university, while many others have been created or added. The university now has faculties dedicated to all major fields of study.

== History ==
When the Civil Service College of King Chulalongkorn was re-established as Chulalongkorn University in 1917, three of its five constituent schools were reorganized into the university's four original faculties: the Faculty of Medicine, Faculty of Public Administration, and Faculty of Engineering. The Faculty of Arts and Science was newly established to cover non-specialized areas of knowledge.

Reorganization in the period following the abolition of absolute monarchy in 1932 resulted in the transfer of several faculties. The Faculty of Public Administration was merged with the Law School of the Ministry of Justice to become the Faculty of Law and Political Science in 1933, and was transferred to the newly established University of Political and Moral Sciences (now Thammasat University) in 1934. The Faculty of Medicine was transferred to the University of Medical Sciences in 1943; it is now known as the Faculty of Medicine Siriraj Hospital, Mahidol University. Conversely, the department of architecture at Poh-Chang School was transferred to Chulalongkorn University in 1932, and became the Faculty of Architecture in 1939. The Faculty of Arts and Science was split into the Faculty of Arts and Faculty of Science in 1943. Most of the university's faculties were founded between 1934 and 1958. New faculties, schools and colleges continue to be established, and the university now has nineteen constituent faculties, as well as six schools and colleges.

== Functions ==
The faculties are tasked with education, research, student development, and academic services in their respective fields, while the colleges hold similar roles but are limited to postgraduate studies. They are administratively equivalent, as are schools, which function like faculties but on a smaller scale. Each is headed by a dean, who chairs its administrative committee and oversees its operations and management. Faculties are responsible for the programmes and courses they teach, as well as student affairs and personnel management (with the establishment of programmes and assignment of higher academic positions subject to approval by the University Council).

== Faculties ==
The current faculties of the university, in order of establishment, are as follows.

Faculty of Engineering
The Faculty of Engineering is one of the original faculties of the university, and the oldest engineering school in the country. Its graduates have contributed significantly to the development of the country's manufacturing industry, and its alumni hold influential positions in multiple major corporations varying in industry from energy and transport to finance and telecommunications. A columnist for Krungthep Turakij newspaper estimated in 2008 that the faculty's alumni probably held executive positions in companies accounting for 80% of market capitalization in the Stock Exchange of Thailand.
Faculty of Arts
The Faculty of Arts is the university's school of the humanities, and one of the two successors to the Faculty of Arts and Science. It has produced influential scholars as well as figures in a diverse range of fields. The faculty has eleven departments covering languages and literature as well as history, geography and philosophy.
Faculty of Science
The Faculty of Science is the other successor to the Faculty of Arts and Science, and offers instruction and research in the various fields of pure and applied natural science. It has fourteen constituent departments.
Faculty of Architecture
The Faculty of Architecture is the oldest such school in the country, having been established at Poh-Chang School in 1930 before it was transferred to Chulalongkorn University's Faculty of Engineering in 1932. It was elevated to full faculty status in 1939.
Faculty of Pharmaceutical Sciences
The Faculty of Pharmaceutical Sciences originated as a department of the Royal Medical College at Siriraj Hospital in 1913, and became independently established at Chulalongkorn University in 1934. It was transferred to the University of Medical Sciences, where it was established as a faculty in 1943, and later returned to Chulalongkorn University in 1971.
Faculty of Veterinary Science
The Faculty of Veterinary Science was established as an independent department of the university in 1937. It was established as a faculty under the University of Medical Sciences in 1943 before becoming part of Kasetsart University in 1954 and returning to Chulalongkorn University in 1967.
Faculty of Commerce and Accountancy
The Faculty of Commerce and Accountancy, also known today as Chulalongkorn Business School, began teaching as departments of accountancy and of commerce in 1938 under the Faculty of Arts and Science, and was established independently in 1940.
Faculty of Dentistry
The Faculty of Dentistry was established as an independent department in 1940, and became a faculty of the University of Medical Sciences in 1943. It was transferred back to Chulalongkorn University in 1972.
Faculty of Medicine
The Faculty of Medicine was established as the country's second medical school in 1947, originally known as the Faculty of Medicine Chulalongkorn Hospital, under the University of Medical Sciences. It was transferred to Chulalongkorn University in 1967.
Faculty of Political Science
The Faculty of Political Science was re-established at Chulalongkorn University in 1948, some fourteen years after original faculty was transferred to Thammasat University.
Faculty of Law
The Faculty of Law was created as a department of the Faculty of Political Science in 1951, and elevated to faculty status in 1972.
Faculty of Education
The Faculty of Education began as a teacher-training programme under the Faculty of Arts and Science in 1928, and later became the Education Department under the Faculty of Arts (which was known as the Faculty of Arts and Education from 1948 to 1957). It was established as a faculty in 1957.
Faculty of Communication Arts
The Faculty of Communication Arts began teaching as an independent department in 1965 and was established as a faculty in 1974. Among its alumni are many influential figures in the Thai entertainment industry, especially those associated with the film studio GTH. The annual play by the faculty's student body, who are also known by the name Nitade Chula, is one of the major student events at the university.
Faculty of Economics
The Faculty of Economics was established in 1970 from the merger of the Economics Department of the Faculty of Commerce and Accountancy and the Public Finance Department of the Faculty of Political Science.
Faculty of Nursing
The Faculty of Nursing began as a department of the Faculty of Education in 1967, and established as a faculty in 1991. It is the only faculty to only teach postgraduate programmes; undergraduate nursing education is provided by the university's affiliate institutions: the Police Nursing College and (previously) the Red Cross College of Nursing.
Faculty of Allied Health Sciences
The Faculty of Allied Health Sciences was established in 1991 from the Faculty of Medicine's Medical Technology Department.
Faculty of Fine and Applied Arts
The Faculty of Fine and Applied Arts was established in 1984, with constituent departments of music, visual arts, dance, and creative arts.
Faculty of Psychology
The Faculty of Psychology was split from the Faculty of Education in 1996.
Faculty of Sports Science
The Faculty of Sports Science originates from the Faculty of Education's Physical Education Department, which began teaching in 1959. It was established as the School of Sports Science in 1998, and as a faculty in 2010.
