= Halal Science Center, Chulalongkorn University =

Coordinates: 13.742609°N 100.526719°E

The Halal Science Center is an instructional center and network of laboratories in Thailand dedicated to maintaining the standards of halal, an Arabic term which designates acceptable objects or actions in Islam and is frequently used in reference to allowed foods. It is the primary network dedicated to halal science in Thailand and, according to the Malaysian Halal Journal, who gave it a Best Innovation in Halal Industry award in 2006, "the first dedicated Halal Science institution in the world."

== Purpose ==
The Halal Science Center analyzes food for contaminants not compatible with the law of Islam and conducts research into new methods of food preparation and new reagents for detecting such contaminants. It also provides information and training to the public and to the food service industry related to the preparation of food in accordance with Islamic law, including offering a bachelor's degree in nutrition and dietetics.

== History ==
The center began as the Central Laboratory and Scientific Information Center for Halal Food Development (Halal-CELSIC) at Chulalongkorn University in Bangkok on 13 August 2003, under a grant from the Cabinet of Thailand. Subsequently, Halal-CELSIC established laboratories in over ten other universities and institutions before reorganizing as the Halal Science Center. Founding Director of Halal Science Center is Assoc. Prof. Dr. Winai Dahlan.

In 2006, the organization received an award for Best Innovation in the Halal Industry from Halal Journal. The award was presented by Abdullah Ahmad Badawi, Prime Minister of Malaysia, in Kuala Lumpur.
