= Tetsu Yasui =

Japanese educator and writer

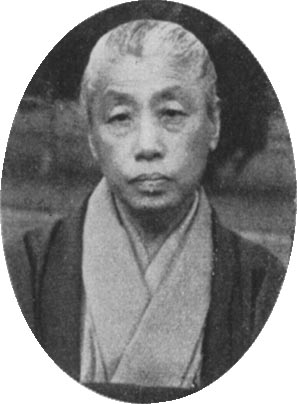
Tetsu Yasui

Tetsu Yasui (安井てつ; March 24, 1870 – December 2, 1945) was a Japanese educator and writer. She was the first dean of Tokyo Woman's Christian University and its second president.

== Biography ==
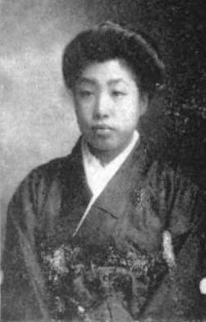
Tetsu Yasui, from a 1923 publication

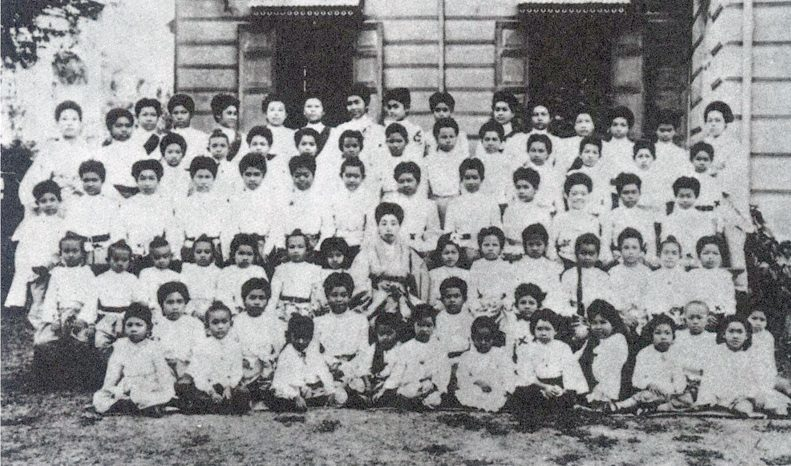
Tetsu Yasui (centre), with Rajini School students, Thailand c. 1904–1906

Yasui was born in 1870 in Tokyo. Her father was a weapons instructor to Doi Toshimoto, a daimyō of Koga Domain. She was largely raised by her devout Buddhist grandparents in Hongō, Tokyo, and attended Tokyo Women's Normal School, graduating in 1890. Upon graduating, she taught at the Women's Normal School for several years before moving to a teaching position at Iwate Prefectural Normal School.

In 1897, Yasui received a scholarship from the Japanese Ministry of Education to attend Cambridge University to study the history of education and psychology under Elizabeth Phillips Hughes at Hughes Hall. She returned to Japan in 1900 and soon converted to Christianity. From 1904 to 1907, she lived abroad in Bangkok, Thailand, where she served as the acting principal of the Rajini Girls School. She traveled to Britain again in 1907 to study at the University of Wales until 1909. She then returned to Tokyo, where she taught at the Gakushūin (Peeresses' School) and Tsuda Umeko's English School from 1909 to 1910. She taught again at Tokyo Women's Normal School from 1910 to 1918. During this time, she wrote over 100 publications, some for Christian periodicals, and started a monthly periodical called Shinjokai (New Women's World) with Miya Ebina on women's issues.

When Tokyo Woman's Christian University was founded in 1918, Yasui was appointed as the first dean. Five years later, she succeeded Nitobe Inazō to become the university's second president. She was president for 17 years until her retirement in 1940. She came out of retirement briefly in 1942 to become principal of the Toyo Eiwa Jogakuin, a girls' school founded by Canadian missionaries.

== Legacy ==
Yasui was the first Japanese female college president. The feminist activist Yamakawa Kikue, who was taught by Yasui at Tokyo Women's Normal School, cited Yasui as an influence and praised her for her contributions to the women's movement in Japan.
