= Rajini School =

- โรงเรียนราชินี

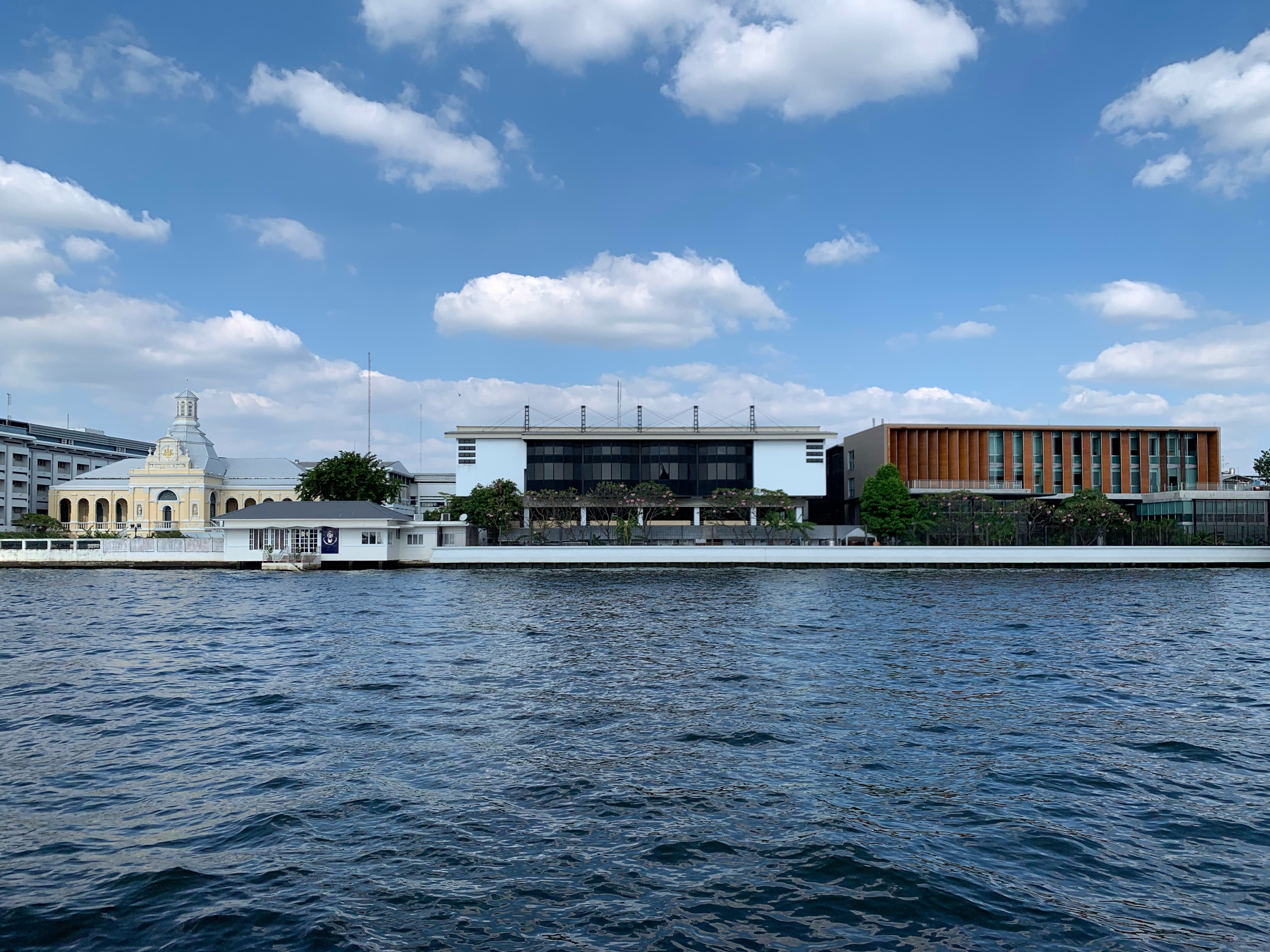

Location
- Phra Nakhon, Bangkok; Thailand; 13°44′34″N 100°29′37″E

Information
- Type: Private
- Established: 1 April 1904
- Founder: Queen Saovabha Phongsri
- Authority: Rajini Foundation
- Superintendent: Pratintip Nakornthap
- Director: Reongsiri Singhadej
- Staff: 245
- Teaching staff: 168
- Grades: Anuban 2 – matthayom 6
- Gender: Mixed (K–primary); Girls (secondary)
- Enrolment: 2,861 (2019)
- Website: rajini.ac.th

Rajini School (Thai: โรงเรียนราชินี, RTGS: Rachini, lit. 'Queen's School') is a private girls' school in Thailand, and one of the oldest in the country. It was founded in 1904 by Queen Saovabha Phongsri as a replacement for the recently closed Sunanthalai School, which she had previously also sponsored. The school is situated in Bangkok's Phra Nakhon District, at the southern tip of the historic inner Rattanakosin Island. Today it admits kindergarten to upper secondary students, with an enrolment of 2,861 in 2019, and is known for its traditional values. The historic Sunanthalai Building is a listed ancient monument.

== History ==
During the late nineteenth century, Thailand, then known as Siam, was undergoing rapid modernisation of its education system. Schools were established by Western missionaries as well as the government of King Chulalongkorn (Rama V). However, the King's focus was mostly on male education, and the creation of schools for girls lagged considerably behind those for boys. In 1892, the government-owned Sunanthalai Girls' School (or Sunandalaya, สุนันทาลัย) was founded under the leadership of Queen Saovabha Phongsri, partly in response to the rise of Christian schools—Wang Lang Girls' School (the precursor of today's Wattana Wittaya Academy) had been established by Presbyterian missionaries in 1874, and enjoyed support from both well-to-do commoners and elite families. Sunanthalai School was positioned much more traditionally, teaching royal domestic skills as well as academic subjects. However, while the school received interest from the extended royal family, the government and the King were less enthusiastic. The school struggled financially, and was closed down in 1902.

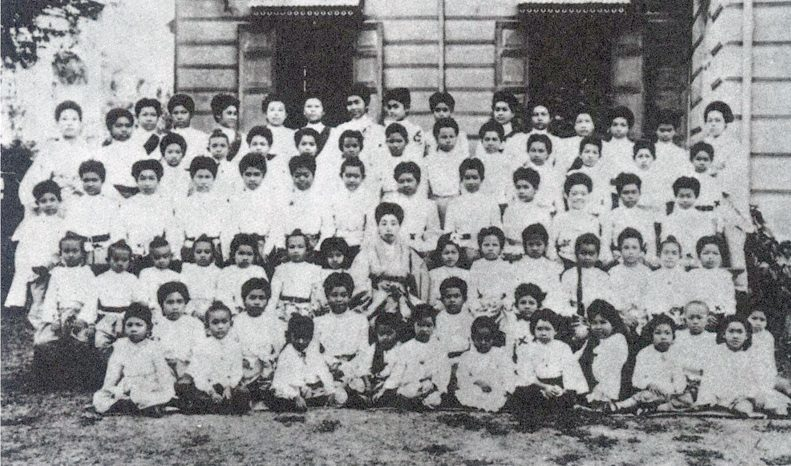
One of the first classes of students, with Japanese principal Tetsu Yasui (seated, centre)

On 1 April 1904 (some sources give 1903), Queen Saovabha established a new school using her own funds, and named it Rajini, meaning "the Queen's School". One of the main problems with Sunanthalai, in her view, was its curriculum being too Western (its initial teaching staff consisted of Western missionary women). Accordingly, Japanese educator Tetsu Yasui was hired as the new school's first principal, giving the school an Eastern orientation to counter the rising Western influence. Partly thanks to its direct association with the Queen, the school became popular among aristocratic families, and was also able to raise funds for expansion.

The school was originally located in a shophouse building at the corner of Damrongrak and Chakphet roads in the Pak Khlong Talat area, but in its first year moved to a riverside building near Tha Chang Wang Na (now the Phra Athit Road area). In 1906, the King granted permission for the school to move into the previous campus of Sunanthalai School, where it has since remained.

The school gradually grew throughout its history, and its curriculum modernized according to national developments. Princess Bichitra Chirabha Devakul, the first Thai woman to become a professional teacher, was the school's principal from 1907 until her death in 1943, and was extremely influential in the school's early development. Following Queen Saovabha's death in 1919, the school came under the patronage of several royals, until the Rajini Foundation was registered to manage the school in 1941.

== Campus ==
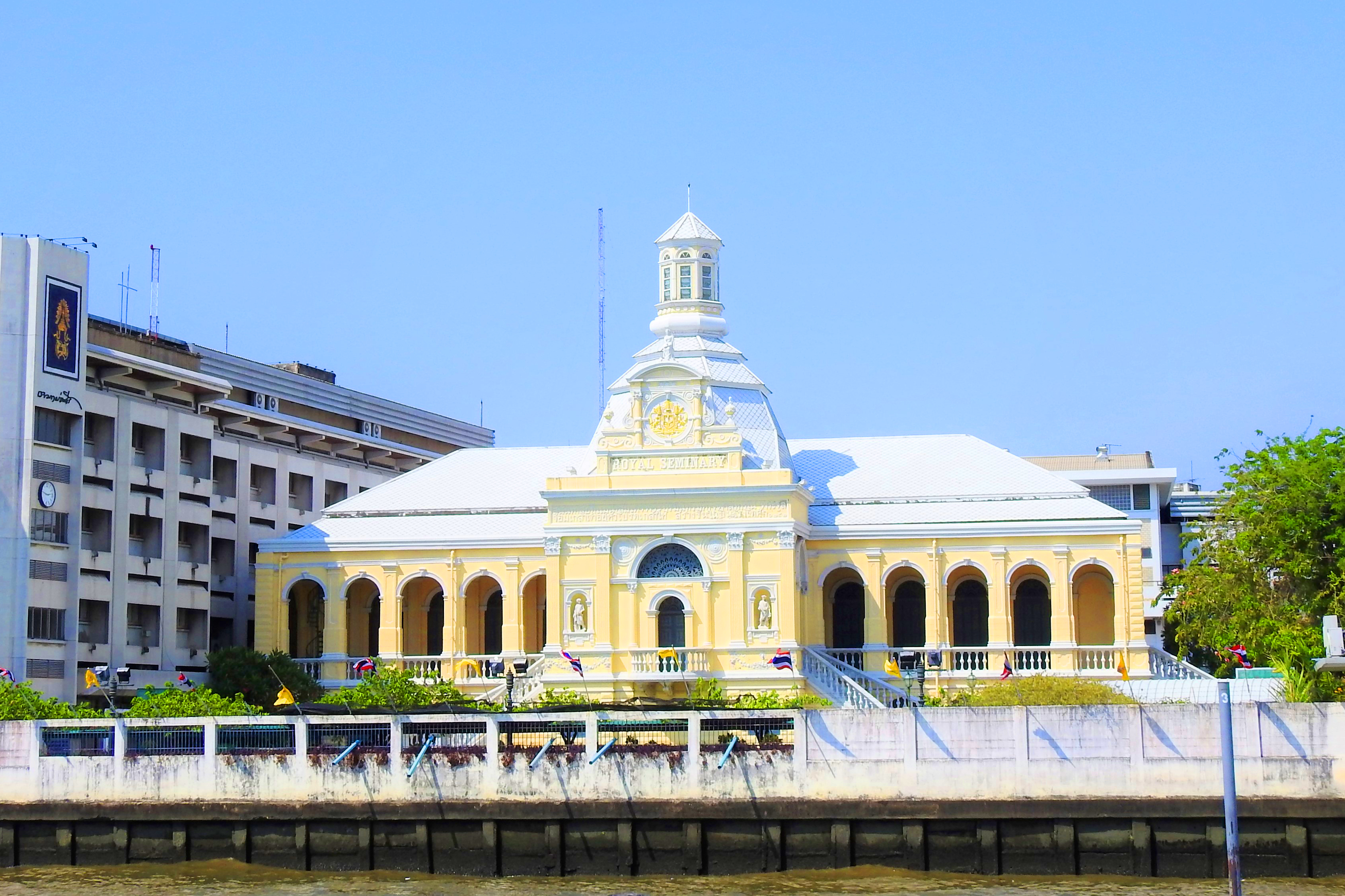
The Sunanthalai Building, seen from the river in 2019

Rajini School is located at the southern end of Maharat Road, next to the old city moat where it meets the Chao Phraya River, marking the southern corner of the inner Rattanakosin Island of the old walled city. It is directly next to Rachini Pier and the Sanam Chai MRT station. The school has ten buildings, five of which hold classes, most notably the historic Sunanthalai Building.

=== Sunanthalai Building ===
The Sunanthalai Building was commissioned by King Chulalongkorn in 1880. It and the Sunanthalai School were named in memory of Queen Sunanda Kumariratana, one of his four queens, who died that year. Attributed by some sources to Italian architect Joachim Grassi, the building is designed in the neoclassical style, with a cross-shaped plan, hipped roof, and a large decorative pediment featuring stucco work depicting the royal coat of arms and the name Royal Seminary, by which the building is also known. The building's two floors are recessed behind arcades spanning the entire width of the front façade. The front of the building was originally crowned with a tiered octagonal dome-shaped roof topped with a lantern tower, but this had been removed sometime between 1917 and 1946.

The building originally had a twin building nearby, known as the South Sunanthalai Building or the "Clock Building". By the 1960s, the south building was deemed to have deteriorated beyond repair, and was demolished. Sunanthalai Building received the ASA Architectural Conservation Award in 1982, and underwent restoration in 1985. To commemorate the school's centennial, the Rajini Foundation in 2005 commissioned major restoration work aiming to bring the building close to its original appearance, including reconstruction of the dome and raising the foundation. The work was set back by a fire on 25 August 2005 which damaged the roof structure, though the restoration continued and was completed in 2006. The building was registered as an ancient monument on 23 June 2005.

== Governance and structure ==
Rajini School operates as a private school, wholly owned by the Rajini Foundation. Mom Luang Pratintip Nakornthap serves as superintendent and Reongsiri Singhadej is the school director, as of 2019.

The school teaches kindergarten to upper secondary levels (ages 4 to 18), and admits a small number of boys in its kindergarten and primary levels. It had an enrolment of 2,861 in the 2019 academic year, consisting of 2,785 girls and 76 boys.

Today, the school continues its tradition of emphasizing qualities of the proper "Thai lady" as the values it instils in its students. It is known for its teaching of traditional handicrafts and skills, and its students often demonstrate crafts such as phuang malai garland making and fruit and vegetable carving at art festivals.

== Notable alumni ==
=== Royalty ===
- Princess Bajrakitiyabha
- Princess Bejaratana
- Princess Galyani Vadhana
- Princess Indrasakdi Sachi
- Queen Rambai Barni
- Queen Sirikit
- Princess Soamsawali
- Sucharit Suda, consort of King Vajiravudh
- Princess Vallabha Devi
- Princess Vimolchatra

=== Others ===
- Charoenchai Sundaravadin, Thai classical musician
- Kaimook Chuto, sculptor
- Krisna Asoksin, writer
- Marsha Vadhanapanich, actress
- Patravadi Mejudhon, playwright
- Poonsapaya Navawongs na Ayudhya, education scholar
- Preeya Chimchom, architect and city planner
- Preeya Kasemsant na Ayutthaya, pharmacist and anti-corruption official
- Seni Pramoj, prime minister
- Teeradon Supapunpinyo, actor
- Tej Bunnag, ambassador
- Thanadsri Svasti, singer and food critic
- Napasorn Weerayuttvilai, actress
- Pattraphus Borattasuwan, actress and singer
