= Butsakon Tantiphana =

Butsakon Tantiphana บุษกร ตันติภนา
- Also known as: Ek (เอ้ก)
- Born: December 7, 1988 (age 37)
- Origin: Bangkok, Thailand
- Occupations: Actress; singer; teen idol; mc
- Years active: 2003–present
- Website: StrawberryCheesecake.tv

Butsakon Tantiphana (Thai: บุษกร ตันติภนา; born 7 December 1988) or Egg (Thai: เอ้ก), is a Thai actress, singer, teen idol and MC of the Thai Television Channel 3.
