= Faculty of Pharmaceutical Sciences, Chulalongkorn University =

Coordinates: 13.7434°N 100.5311°E

- คณะเภสัชศาสตร์ จุฬาลงกรณ์มหาวิทยาลัย
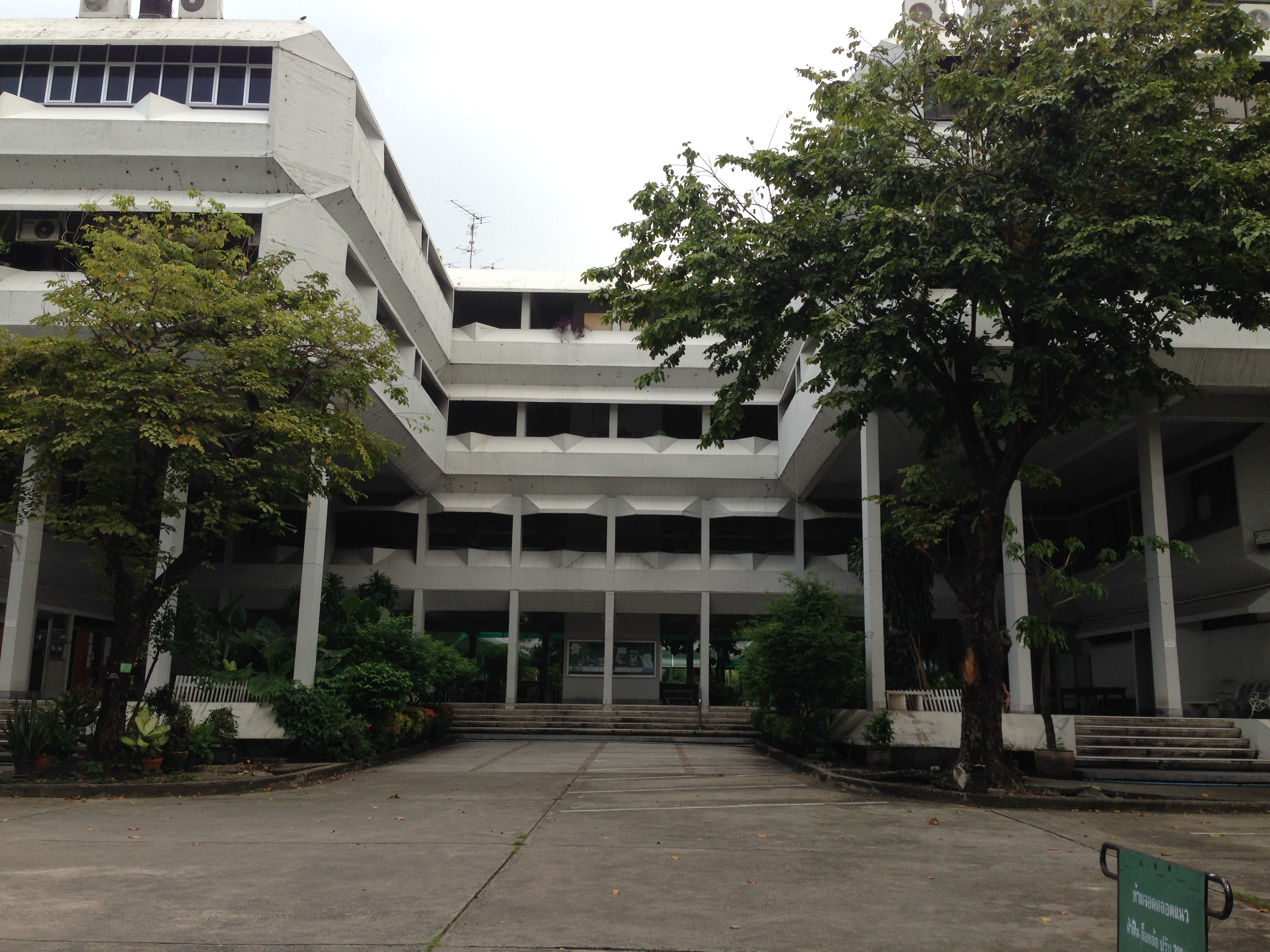
- Type: Public
- Established: December 8, 1913
- Parent institution: Chulalongkorn University
- Dean: Assist.Prof. Rungpetch Sakulbumrungsil, Ph.D.
- Students: 1,100
- Undergraduates: 861
- Postgraduates: 158
- Doctoral students: 81
- Location: Bangkok, Thailand
- Campus: Urban
- Symbolic tree: Auri
- Colours: Olive Green
- Website: www.pharm.chula.ac.th

The Faculty of Pharmaceutical Sciences, Chulalongkorn University (Thai: คณะเภสัชศาสตร์ จุฬาลงกรณ์มหาวิทยาลัย) is the first Pharmacy school in Thailand, located in Bangkok. The faculty was founded by Prince Rangsit Prayurasakdi on December 8, 1913, as a department of Doctor for Compounding in the Royal Medical College, commonly called "Rong Rean Prung Ya" which means "School of Compounding Medicine". After the establishment of Chulalongkorn University in 1916, the Royal Medical College became the Faculty of Medicine under the university. The department of Compounding Medicine also had been renamed to "Panak Phat Pasom Ya" or "Doctor for Compounding Medicine Department" (Thai: แผนกแพทย์ผสมยา) since April 6, 1917. It is the first time that Pharmacy Education in Thailand has been elevated in higher educational system.

The school renamed to "Department of Pharmacy" in the 1933. After Thai Pdanukornam suggested to use "pharmacy" (เภสัชกรรม) instead of "compounding medicine" (ปรุงยา). Later, the Chulalongkorn University Act B.E. 2477 divided the department from Faculty of Medicine to be an independent department, and changed a degree to "Certificate in Pharmacy (P.p.)". However the Dean of Faculty of Medicine also acting as a head of Department of Pharmacy.

Nowadays, Faculty of Pharmaceutical Sciences Chulalongkorn University has bachelor's degree, master's degree and PhD programs. The undergraduate courses were opened in two programs, including Bachelor in Pharmacy in Pharmaceutical Sciences and Clinical Pharmacy. Both of them are 6-year study programs. The Faculty consists of 7 departments and also exchange students with other universities in other countries such as exchange students program with Chiba University, exchange faculty staff such as faculty researchers and students in universities abroad featuring United States, United Kingdom, Japan and South Korea.

Faculty of Pharmaceutical Sciences Chulalongkorn University is ranked 101–150 in the world by QS world university ranking by subject 2017.

== History ==
=== School of Doctor for Medical Preparation ===
In reign of King Vajiravudh (Ranam VI), Prince Chakrabongse Bhuvanath gave his though about establishing the pharmacy school in Siam to Prince Rangsit Prayurasakdi, Royal Medical College inspector, and he also agreed. Prince Rangsit Prayurasakdi wrote the note entitled "Doctor for compounding medicine practice opinion " on October 5, 1913. After that, Ministry of Dhammakan announced "the regulation of Doctor for Compouding Medicine Students" on December 8, 1913. This date has become an officially established date for this school and also pharmacy professional in Siam.

The school of doctor for compounding medicine was classified as a department in Royal Medical College. The school was begun the academic on June 2, 1914, for the first time with 4 students. The certificate for the graduated students was "Certificate of Medicine Compouder". Then, King Vajiravudh founded Chulalongkorn University which gathered 4 independent colleges in Siam became 4 faculties under the university administration. The school of doctor for compounding medicine, as a department of Royal Medical College, changed to Department of Doctor for Compounding Medicine under Faculty of Medicine. The School used two places for education, Windsor Palace and Siriraj Hospital. Later, Thai Pdanukornam (Thai Lexicon) announced to use "Pharmacy" (เภสัชกรรม) instead of "Doctor for Compouding Medicine" (แพทย์ปรุงยา). So, the school was changed the name to "Department of Pharmacy" under the Faculty of Medicine Siriraj Hospital. Later, House of representatives enacted the Chulalongkorn University Act B.E. 2477 which moved the School of Pharmacy from Faculty of Medicine to an independent department, and changed a degree name to "Certificate in Pharmacy (C.P.)". However, the Dean of Faculty of Medicine in charged as a department principal.

In 1936, the academic degree for pharmacy was upgraded to "Diploma in Pharmacy", studying period was 3 years. Although this new curriculum gathered the new innovation and modern in pharmacy, but it was still an uninteresting field of studying in that time. Until Tua Lapanukrom, director of sciences department, was appointed to be a department principal. He improved the school administration and asked the university council for school's own budget. In his era, the government approved school building construction project, located inside Chulalongkorn University, connected to Faculty of Arts and Faculty of Architectures.

=== Faculty of Pharmacy, University of Medical Sciences ===
In 1943, the government reformed management in country and established University of Medical Sciences (currently named Mahidol University), compose of 4 health sciences faculties which separated from Chulalongkorn University. Department of Pharmacy, Chulalongkorn University became "the faculty of Pharmacy, University of Medical Sciences". Although the new university has been established, but the education in all faculties still using the area in Chulalongkorn University, excepted the faculty of Medicine that educating in Siriraj Hospital. In 1957, the faculty upgraded the certificate to Bachelor in Pharmacy which spending 5 years in curriculum. The additional year is practicing year for the students in hospital, retail pharmacy, manufacturing company and the other field of pharmacy. Especially in 1906, Thai social concerned the roll of pharmacist as part of allied professional health team, the faculty added some clinical pharmacy courses to response their need.

On August 22, 1962, Thai Ministry of Education sent the letter to the university's rector to expand the student number in Pharmacy field. By the limited of the faculty expanding the building which located in Chulalongkorn University area, the university decided to establish the new pharmacy faculty. In 1968, the royal decree announced the establishment of the new pharmacy faculty called "Phayathai Faculty of Pharmacy, University of Medical Sciences", made that time there are two pharmacy faculties in the university. Later, King Bhumibol Adulyadej declared the name of the university to be changed to Mahidol University in 1969. Therefore, the faculty had been renamed to "Faculty of Pharmacy, Mahidol University" which still located in Chulalongkorn University area.

=== Faculty of Pharmaceutical Sciences, Chulalongkorn University ===
In 1972, the revolutionary council announced changing the status of the faculty affiliated to Chulalongkorn University and renamed the faculty to "Faculty of Pharmaceutical Sciences, Chulalongkorn University". This made Mahidol University has the only pharmacy faculty left in university, thus Thai University Bureau approved changing name of "Phayathai Faculty of Pharmacy, Mahidol University" to "Faculty of Pharmacy, Mahidol University" (which cut "Phayathai" from its name). With the limited problem in expanding the faculty, Chulalongkorn University initiated the "Medical Square" project near Siam Square area, featuring 3 faculties: dentistry, veterinarian and pharmacy. Chulalongkorn University approved the budget for constructing the new pharmacy building in that area which completed in 1982.

In 1989, the faculty opened the Doctoral Degree in 3 fields, and the later year, the faculty improved the curriculum in bachelor's degree to be a half-professional field featuring hospital pharmacy, manufacturing pharmacy, research and development, administration and retail community pharmacy and public health pharmacy. In 1993, the faculty opened the new building named "80th Pharmacy", which provided the new technology in lecture room and also in laboratory, to celebrate the 80th anniversary of the faculty.

At the present time, the faculty provides the curriculum covering 3 degrees—Bachelor of Pharmacy, Master's degree and Doctoral Degree. It has one museum that collecting international herbs, crude drugs, and antique application for making the medicine such as Dvaravati stone mortar and pestle, Thai long book which collected the pharmacopoeia. This museum opened in 2001 by Princess Maha Chakri Sirindhorn.

== Academic ==
=== Department ===
- Department of Pharmaceutical Technology and industry
- Department of Pharmacy Practice
- Department of Food and Pharmaceutical Chemistry
- Department of Biochemistry and Microbiology
- Department of Pharmacognosy and Pharmaceutical Botany
- Department of Pharmacology and Physiology
- Department of Social and Administration Pharmacy
