= Chirayu Navawongs =

Thai scholar and privy councillor

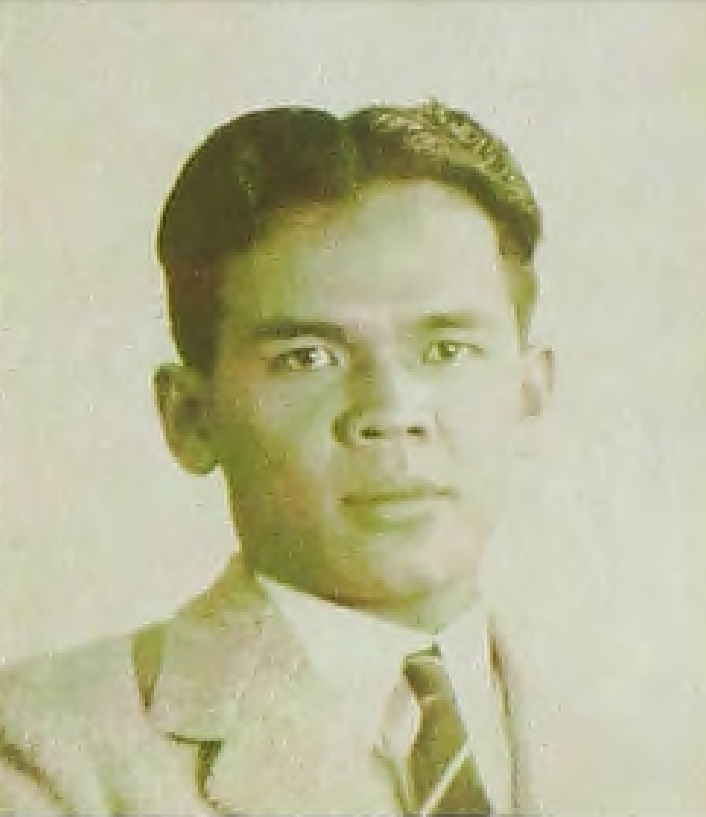
Chirayu Navawongs

Mom Luang Chirayu Navawongs (Thai: จิรายุ นพวงศ์, RTGS: Chirayu Nopphawong; 16 June 1912 – 7 November 2003) was a Thai scholar and privy councillor. He was a professor at Chulalongkorn University, mainly teaching Pali and Sanskrit, and later served as Dean of the Faculty of Arts. He also served as Deputy Minister of Education, and was a fellow of the Royal Society. He was appointed to the Privy Council of King Bhumibol Adulyadej in 1975.
