= Faculty of Arts, Chulalongkorn University =

- คณะอักษรศาสตร์ จุฬาลงกรณ์มหาวิทยาลัย
- Former names: Faculty of Arts and Science
- Established: 1917
- Parent institution: Chulalongkorn University
- President: Prapod Assavavirulhakarn
- Location: Bangkok, Thailand
- Journal: Journal of Arts
- Colors: Grey
- Website: www.arts.chula.ac.th
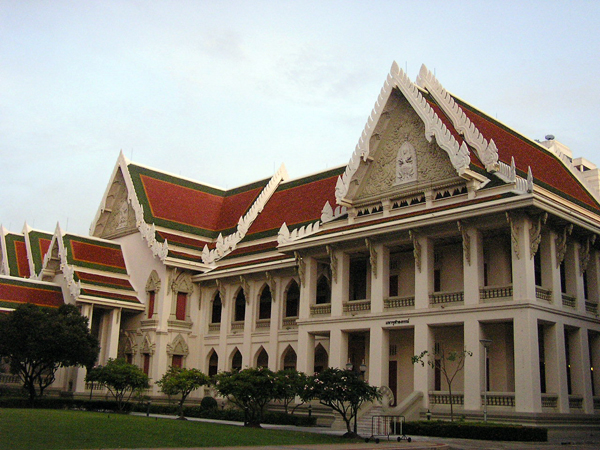

The Faculty of Arts, Chulalongkorn University (Thai: คณะอักษรศาสตร์ จุฬาลงกรณ์มหาวิทยาลัย), was established in 1917. It was one of the first four faculties of the university. Its former name was "Faculty of Arts and Science". At the time of its establishment, the first two missions of the faculty were to teach the students humanities and sciences and to produce secondary school teachers. In 1934, the faculty started to offer a bachelor's degree of arts. Today, there are undergraduate and graduate programs.

According to QS world university ranking by subject, Faculty of Arts, Chulalongkorn University is ranked as No. 1 in Thailand in modern languages (51–100 in the world), linguistics (151–200 in the world), English language and literature, history and philosophy.

== History ==
On 26 March 1916, King Vajiravudh had the Civil Service College elevated to the status of a university and named it after his father, Chulalongkorn. In the subsequent year, Prince Rangsit of Chainat, who was the first director-general of the University Affairs Department in the Ministry of Education, established the Faculty of Arts and Science together with other faculties in the university, namely, engineering, medicine, and political science.

During its initial stages, the Faculty of Arts and Science placed emphasis on courses related to pre-medicine: chemistry, biology, and physics. Students could also take classes in English, French, and history. In 1928, it offered a three-year program to grant a secondary-school teaching certificate. During the first two years, students in the program had to take classes required for graduation from the Faculty of Arts. These included Thai, Pali, English, French, history, Dhammavipak, and mathematics. Later, German was added to the program. In the third year, students had to fulfill requirements in pedagogy. In 1930, a three-year program in science was launched. Students were made to take courses in science during their first two years and complete the requirements in pedagogy in the third year before they were granted a certificate.

The program was further developed to offer a bachelor's degree in 1934. The number of the first batch of graduates from the Faculty of Arts was 33. Subsequently, a master's degree program was established in 1942 and two students graduated with an MA in 1944.

In 1950, the Faculty of Arts was entirely separated from the Faculty of Science and its administration was undertaken by its own staff. In 1961, the Faculty of Arts was restructured and separated into six divisions: Thai, Eastern languages, English, Western languages, geography and history, and library science. Two divisions, philosophy and dramatic arts, were established in 1971 and 1975 respectively.

At present, the Faculty of Arts consists of eleven departments: Thai, English, history, geography, library science, philosophy, dramatic arts, Eastern languages, Western languages, linguistics, and comparative literature.

== Buildings ==
=== Mahachulalongkorn Building ===
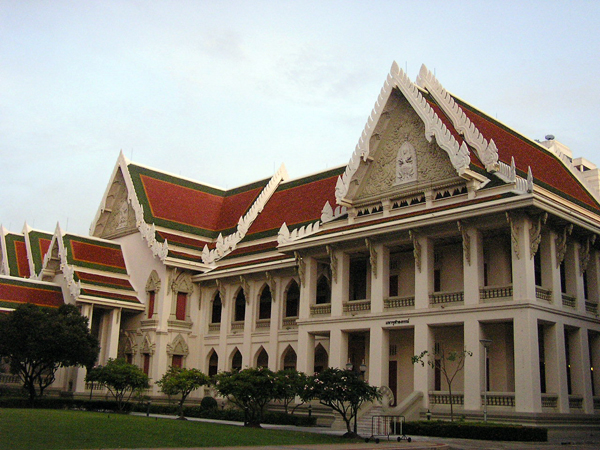
Mahachulalongkorn Building

The Mahachulalongkorn Building (Thai: มหาจุฬาลงกรณ์) or Tewalai (Thai: เทวาลัย), a building in traditional architectural style, was designed by a German architect from the Ministry of Interior named Dr. Karl Dohring and an English architect from the Ministry of Education, Edward Healey. The two architects mixed ancient Thai styles from the Sukothai and Sawankaloke periods with Western motifs. It was built in 1914 to be an office of the university.

On 3 January 1915, King Rama V went to the university for the opening of this building. On 26 March 26, 1916, the king changed the university's former name, Kharatchakarnponlaruan School (Thai: ข้าราชการพลเรือน), to its new name, Chulalongkorn University (Thai: จุฬาลงกรณ์). The building was the first used for university offices. It was named Banchakarn (Thai: บัญชาการ) before it became Aksorasat 1 (Thai: อักษรศาสตร์) and then Mahachulalongkorn.

The building received the Association of Siamese Architects' Architectural Conservation Award in 1987.

Arts students believe that students who take a photo with the Phaya Naga at the foot of the stairs of the building will not graduate.

=== Mahavajiravudh building ===
This building houses offices and the faculty library.

=== Borommaratchakumaree building ===
This building was named after Princess Maha Chakri Sirindhorn. The area of this building used to be Aksorasat 3 building. In front of the building, there are four pillars which used to be the pillars of Aksorasat 3 building. The building is now the main building of the faculty. Most departments of the faculty are here.

=== Mahachakrisirindhorn building ===
This building was named after Princess Maha Chakri Sirindhorn. The area of this building used to be the Aksorasat 4 building and the faculty canteen. A nine storey building is now being built and is to be the new main building of the faculty.
