= Chulalongkorn University =

Public university in Bangkok, Thailand

- จุฬาลงกรณ์มหาวิทยาลัย
- Phra Kiao, Chulalongkorn University Seal
- Former names: Royal Pages School; Civil Service College of King Chulalongkorn
- Motto: เกียรติภูมิจุฬาฯ คือเกียรติแห่งการรับใช้ประชาชน (unofficial); เสาหลักแห่งแผ่นดิน (vision statement); Chulalongkorn’s honour lies in serving the people (unofficial); Pillar of the Kingdom (vision statement)
- Type: Autonomous public university
- Established: 26 March 1917; 109 years ago
- Budget: 7,642 million baht (FY2023, government budget revenue)
- President: Wilert Puriwat
- Students: 41,611
- Undergraduates: 30,262
- Postgraduates: 11,349
- Doctoral students: 2,609
- Location: Pathum Wan, Bangkok, Thailand; 13.738359°N 100.532097°E
- Campus: Downtown 2.0944 km^{2} (0.8087 sq mi)
- Anthem: "Maha Chulalongkorn" ("Great Chulalongkorn")
- Colours: Pink
- Mascot: Samanea saman
- Website: www.chula.ac.th www.chula.ac.th/en

Chulalongkorn University (CU; Thai: จฬ.; Thai: จุฬาลงกรณ์มหาวิทยาลัย, RTGS: Chulalongkon Mahawitthayalai) is a public autonomous research university in Bangkok, Thailand. The university was originally founded during King Chulalongkorn's reign as a school for training royal pages and civil servants in 1899 (B.E. 2442) at the Grand Palace. It was later established as a national university in 1917, making it the oldest institute of higher education in Thailand.

During the reign of Chulalongkorn's son, King Vajiravudh, the Royal Pages School became the Civil Service College of King Chulalongkorn. The Rockefeller Foundation was instrumental in helping the college form its academic foundation. On 26 March 1917, King Vajiravudh renamed the college "Chulalongkorn University".

Chulalongkorn University is one of the National Research Universities and supported by the Office of Nation Education Standards and Quality Assessment of Thailand. Moreover, CU is the only Thai university which is a member of Association of Pacific Rim Universities (APRU).

CU is composed of nineteen faculties, a School of Agriculture, three colleges, ten institutes and two other schools. Its campus occupies a vast area in downtown Bangkok. Graduates customarily receive their diplomas from the King of Thailand, a tradition begun by King Prajadhipok.

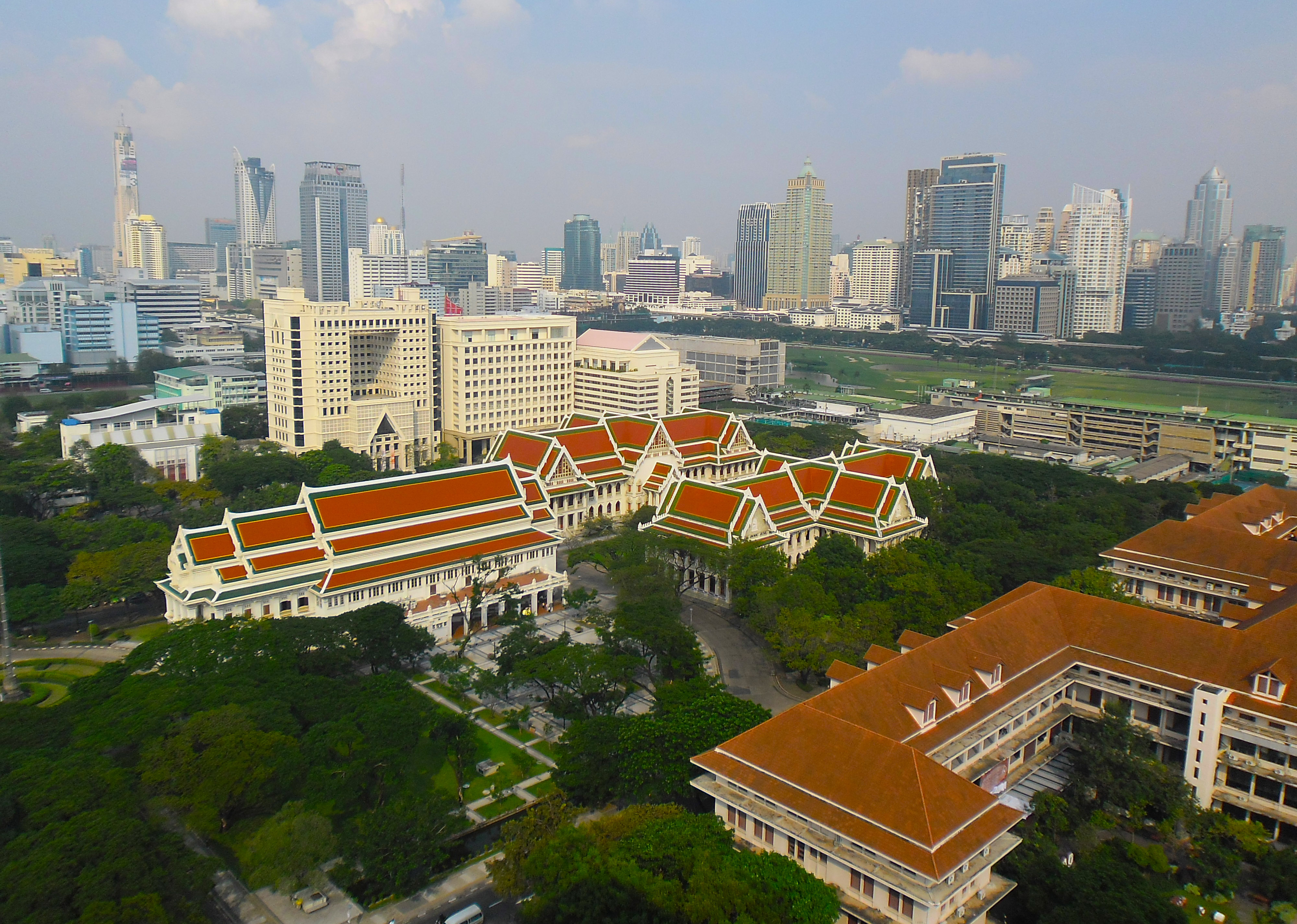
Chulalongkorn University (East Side)

== History ==
=== Civil Service Training School ===
King Chulalongkorn's reforms, aimed at transforming Thailand into a modern state, demanded trained officials specialized in various fields. In 1899, the King founded the "Civil Service Training School" near the north gate of the Grand Palace. Those who graduated from the school would become royal pages. As royal pages, they learned how to manage organizations by working closely with the king, which was a traditional way to enter the Siamese bureaucracy. After serving as royal pages, they would then serve in the Ministry of Interior or other government ministries.

=== Royal Pages School to Civil Service College of King Chulalongkorn ===
On 1 April 1902, the King renamed the school. It became the "Royal Pages School" (Thai: โรงเรียนมหาดเล็ก). On 1 January 1911, King Vajiravudh changed the name to "Civil Service College of King Chulalongkorn" (Thai: โรงเรียนข้าราชการพลเรือนของพระบาทสมเด็จพระจุลจอมเกล้าเจ้าอยู่หัว) as a memorial to his father and moved the school to Windsor Palace in the Pathum Wan district.

The King subsidized the construction of a university campus and organized various schools around the city into Chulalongkorn. The college offered eight majors taught by five schools including;

- School of International Relations in the Royal Palace
- School of Teacher Training at Baan Somdet Chao Phraya
- Royal Medical College at Siriraj Hospital
- School of Legal Studies
- School of Mechanical Sciences at Windsor Palace

=== Chulalongkorn University ===
King Rama VI realized that education should be provided not only to bureaucrats, but to all people. On 26 March 1917, the college was upgraded to "Chulalongkorn University" (Thai: จุฬาลงกรณ์มหาวิทยาลัย), and the schools were transformed into four faculties: Faculty of Arts and Sciences, Faculty of Public Administration, Faculty of Engineering, and Faculty of Medicine.

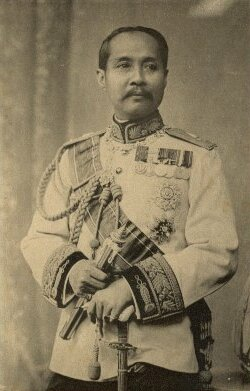
The university was named after King Chulalongkorn

The Rockefeller Foundation reorganized the curriculum of the Faculty of Medicine. In 1923, the Faculty of Medicine became the first faculty to accept secondary school (Mattayom) graduates. The remaining faculties then followed suit. After the 1932 Revolution, the People's Party wanted legal and political studies to be independent of "royalists" so they moved the Faculty of Law and Political Science to the new Thammasat University in 1933.

In 1938, Chulalongkorn University's Preparatory School was founded to provide pre-collegiate education to students. Those who managed to enter the university had to spend two years in the Preparatory School before going on to the Faculty of Arts and Sciences. The Preparatory School, however, ceased to be a university-owned preparatory school in 1947 and became the independent Triam Udom Suksa School. Later, the university established Chulalongkorn University Demonstration School (CUD) as a laboratory school for primary and secondary education for the Faculty of Education.

== Symbols ==
=== Phra Kiao ===
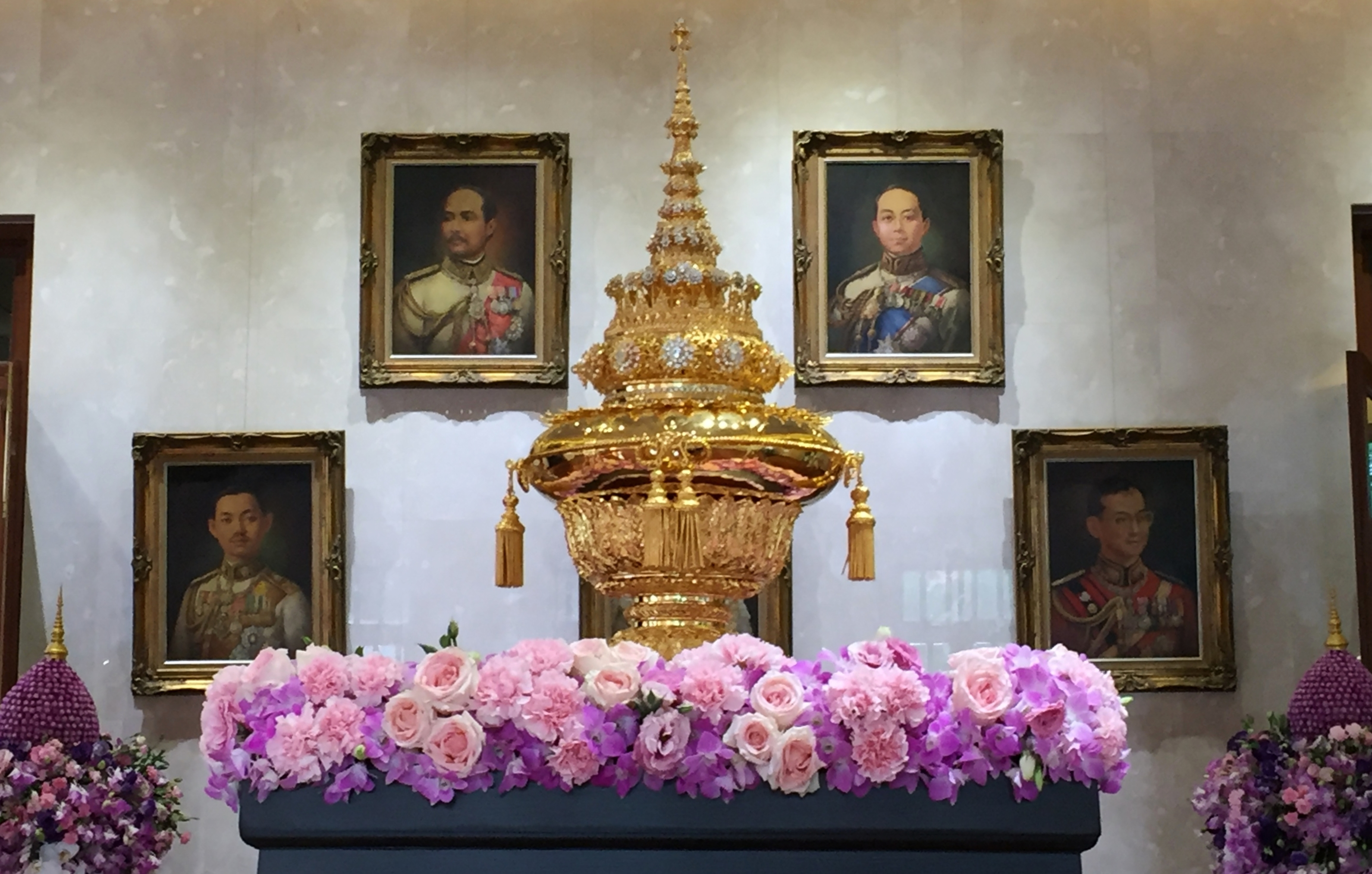
Pra Kiao model, CU Museum

Since the establishment of the Royal Pages School, the former name of the university, King Chulalongkorn authorized the use of his personal emblem as a school emblem. The emblem is called Phra Kiao, a Thai coronet, royal headgear for young princes and princesses. As the school was transformed into the university, the King authorized the use of phra kiao. Today, phra kiao appears not only in formal letters and transcripts, but also on souvenirs made by the university as well as student uniforms.

=== Student uniform ===
Chulalongkorn University Student in the Uniform at the Prime Minister's Office (2010)

Undergraduate students at Chulalongkorn University are not universally required to wear uniforms in all university settings. Uniform requirements and dress codes vary by faculty and activity, with some faculties maintaining specific regulations. Students may wear uniforms voluntarily where they are not mandatory. The traditional undergraduate uniform generally consists of a white shirt or blouse and dark bottoms, with specific designs and requirements varying by gender and applicable university or faculty regulations.

Originally, the university uniform was adapted from a uniform worn by Chulalongkorn's heirs. The uniform was later updated, but the original is reserved as a formal uniform. The formal uniform is usually worn by student leaders and graduates.

Today, the ordinary uniform for male undergraduate students consists of a plain white shirt with long or short sleeves and black (or dark blue) trousers. Wearing a dark blue necktie with colored phra kiao engraved on its front is mandatory for first-year students but optional for higher years. However, a black tie with a silver phra kiao pin is usually used by upperclass student in some faculties. Female students are required to wear a short-sleeved blouse with a fold along the spine. The buttons must be made of metal, and a small phra kiao emblem must be pinned on the right breast. A dark blue or black pleated skirt with any black, white, or brown shoes are worn. For female first-year students, white leather shoes are mandatory. Chulalongkorn University's uniforms have long been the template of many uniforms used in other universities in Thailand.

=== Academic dress ===
The academic dress of Chulalongkorn University is based on ceremonial attire called khrui, a gown made from very fine mesh. The robe was originally reserved for pre-ordination monks, ministers and royal family members. Like dresses worn in the United Kingdom, the robe is open-fronted and calf-length. Cap and hood, however, are omitted. The gown is faced and lined with a felt strip dyed according to the status of the wearer and decorated with gold ribbons. The elbow and wrist portion of the gown is also wrapped with the same felt strip.

Bachelor's and master's gown is faced and bordered with a black felt strip, while a doctor's gown uses a scarlet felt strip. This colour scheme is similar to one used at the University of Oxford: Black for bachelors and masters (and doctors in undress); Scarlet for doctors (in full-dress). The cord (bachelor) or ribbon (master and doctor) dyed with the faculty colour is attached to the centre of the felt strip longitudinally. Officers' (lecturers, university council members, vice-chancellor and chancellor) gown is faced with a pink strip and centred with a gold thread, regardless of the faculty. The specially designed gown with a yellow facing is reserved for the king of Thailand, who is also Visitor to the University.

Vajiravudh authorized the university to use the traditional Thai gown instead of the western one, but the regulation on this matter was enacted in 1930 by Prajadhipok.

==== Example of felt strips ====
Visitor to the University's robe

Officer's robe

Faculty of Science BSc

Faculty of Science MSc or MRes

Faculty of Science PhD

Faculty of Commerce and Accountancy B.Acc.

Faculty of Commerce and Accountancy MAcc

Faculty of Commerce and Accountancy DCom

=== Rain Trees ===
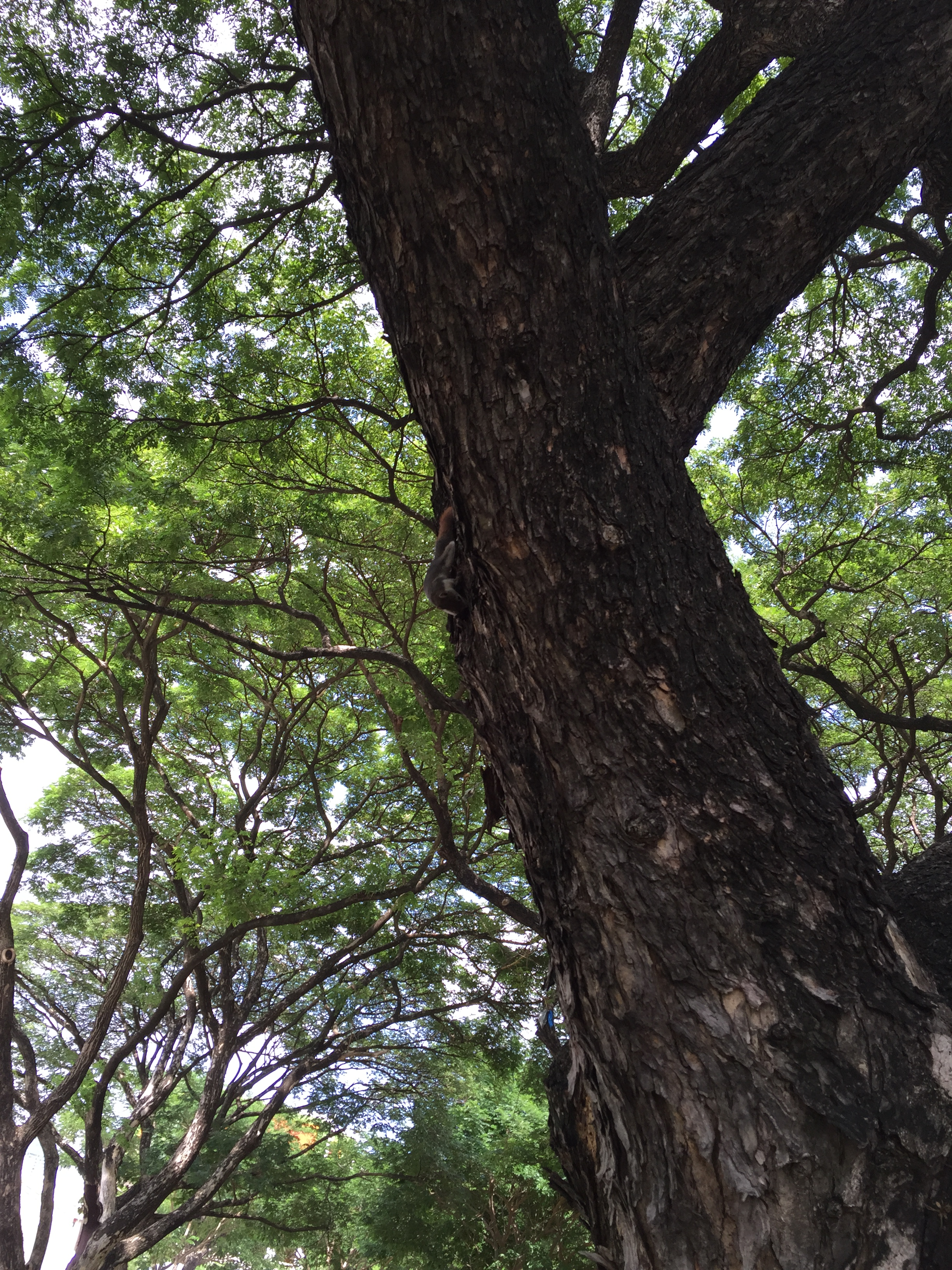
Rain Tree near CU Auditorium

Rain trees are common on the university campus. They are associated with the cycle of student life. Fresh green leaves at beginning of the term represent the freshmen's naivete. As the tree produces slimy pods and sheds leaves, the ground beneath it becomes slippery, thus alerting students to prepare for examinations. If they walk carefully, they will not slip (pass examinations). If they walk heedlessly, they will slip and fall (fail examinations).

From 1937 to 1957, many rain trees were cut down to free space for new buildings. King Bhumibol Adulyadej noticed the dramatic decrease in the number of rain trees. On 15 January 1962, he brought five trees from Hua Hin and planted them in front of the university auditorium, proclaiming: "...I give these five trees as an eternal memorial." (Thai: จึงขอฝากต้นไม้ไว้ห้าต้นให้เป็นเครื่องเตือนใจตลอดกาล).

== Organization ==
East View of Chulalongkorn University Faculty of Political Science Faculty of Dentistry CU central campus Chamchuri 10 Building, General Education Classrooms and Chulalongkorn School of Integrated Innovation Faculty of Medicine and King Chulalongkorn Memorial Hospital

Chulalongkorn University consists of 19 faculties, three colleges, one school and many institutes which function as teaching and research units.

In 1917, the university had four faculties: Arts and Sciences, Public Administration, Engineering, and Medicine. The Faculty of Law was established in 1933 as part of the Faculty of Law and Political Science. From the 1930s to the 1950s it expanded to various fields including Pharmacy (1934), Veterinary Science (1935), Architecture (1939), Dentistry (1940), and Commerce and Accountancy (1943). In 1943, the regency government under General Phibun separated the Faculty of Medicine, Dentistry, Pharmacy, and Veterinary Science to become the University of Medical Sciences, now Mahidol University. In 1948, the Faculty of Political Science was re-established. The Faculty of Education was established in 1957 from the School of Teacher Training at Baan Somdet Chao Phraya (Thai: โรงเรียนฝึกหัดครู บ้านสมเด็จเจ้าพระยา). In 1967, the Faculty of Veterinary Science was returned from Kasetsart University and the Faculty of Medicine at Chulalongkorn Hospital was moved from University of Medical Sciences to Chulalongkorn University. In 1972, the Faculty of Dentistry and Faculty of Pharmacy were reinstated.

The Office of the Commission on Agricultural Resource Education (OCARE) was established in 2009. It is not an administrative office, but a school in which teaching and research are carried out. It admits students from two groups: one from northern Thai provinces (Nan, Phayao, Phrae, Uttaradit) and another from the rest of country. It was upgraded to the School of Agricultural Resources with full degree-granting power on 5 March 2014. In 2014 it became the School of Agriculture, Chulalongkorn University (SAR).

In 2019, aiming to address global industry changes and demand for relevant education, Chulalongkorn University launched Chulalongkorn School of Integrated Innovation (ScII) to offer the first in Asia interdisciplinary undergraduate degree in both arts and science – Bachelor of Arts and Science in Integrated Innovation (BAScii).

=== Health sciences ===
- Faculty of Allied Health Sciences
- Faculty of Dentistry
- Faculty of Medicine
- Faculty of Nursing
- Faculty of Pharmaceutical Sciences
- Faculty of Psychology
- Faculty of Sport Sciences
- Faculty of Veterinary Science

=== Science and technology ===
- Faculty of Architecture
- Faculty of Engineering
- Faculty of Integrated Agriculture
- Faculty of Science

=== Social science and humanities ===
- Faculty of Commerce and Accountancy (Also known as Chulalongkorn Business School)
- Faculty of Arts
- Faculty of Communication Arts
- Faculty of Economics
- Faculty of Education
- Faculty of Fine and Applied Arts (Art)
- Faculty of Law
- Faculty of Political Science

=== Interdisciplinary school ===
- School of Integrated Innovation

== International programs ==
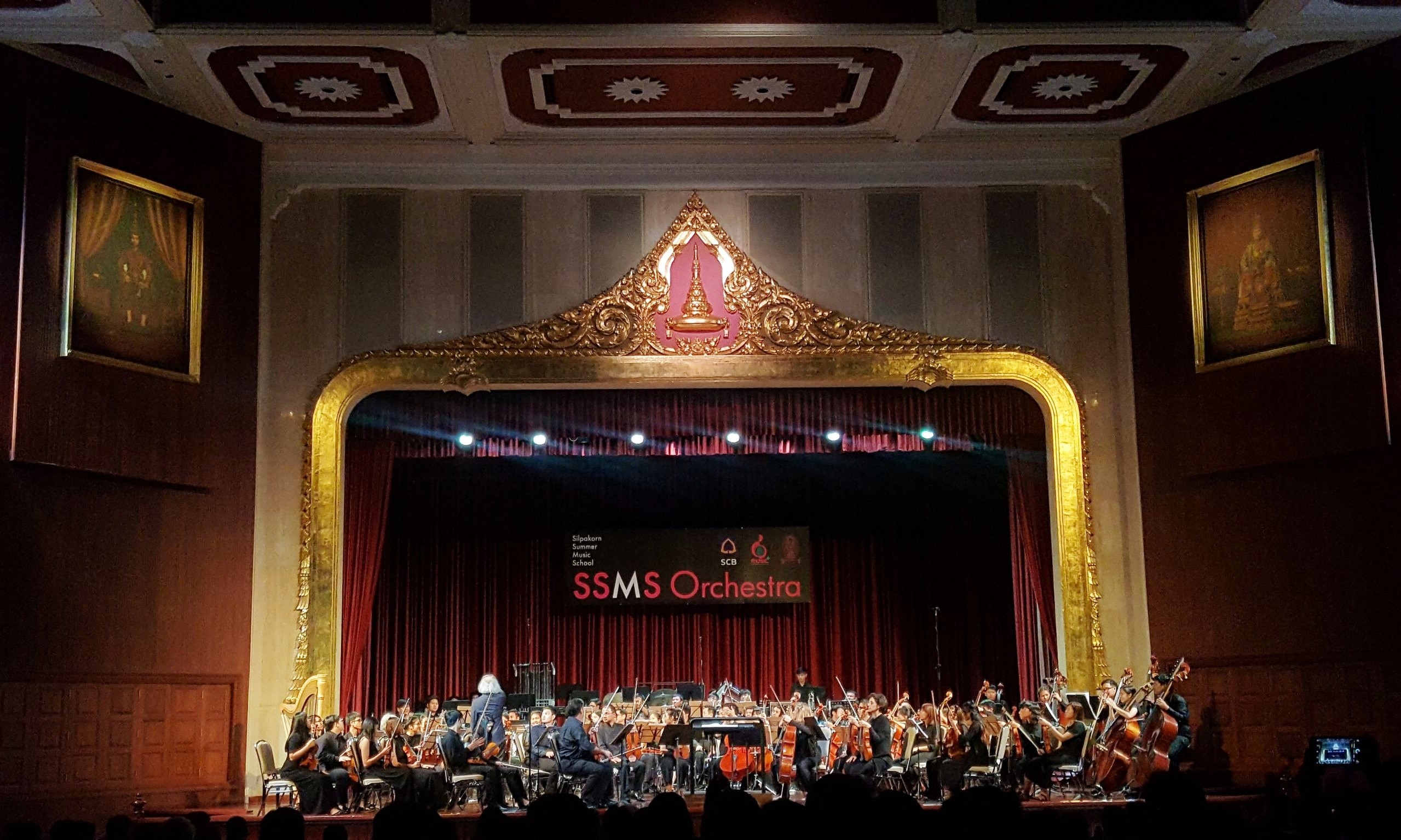
Chulalongkorn University Auditorium Mahitaladhibesra Building (Lecture Building) Chamchuri 9 Building (University Health Center and Student Lounge) Chulalongkorn University Stadium Maha Vajirunhis Building (Faculty of Science)

CU's international programs offers 99 international programs, including 17 Bachelor, 48 Master and 34 Doctoral programs. Admissions for international students are based on the guidelines issued by the Council of University Presidents of Thailand.

Bachelor's Degrees:

- Chula International School of Engineering
- Faculty of Science
- Faculty of Architecture – International Program of Design and Architecture -INDA- and CommDe
- School of Integrated Innovation – Bachelor of Arts and Science in Integrated Innovation (BAScii)
- Chulalongkorn Business School – The Bachelor of Business Administration
- Faculty of Architecture
- Faculty of Communication Arts
- Faculty of Economics
- Faculty of Arts
- Faculty of Political Science
- Faculty of Psychology
- Faculty of Law

=== Graduate institutes ===
- College of Population Studies
- College of Public Health Science
- Graduate School
- Language Institute
- Petroleum and Petrochemical College
- Sasin School of Management

=== Research institutes ===
- Aquatic Resources Research Institute
- Energy Research Institute
- Environmental Research Institute
- Institute of Asian Studies
- Institute of Biotechnology and Genetic Engineering
- Metallurgy and Materials Science Research Institute
- Social Research Institute
- Transportation Institute

=== Associated institutes ===
- Police Nursing College
- Red Cross College of Nursing

== Admissions ==
=== Overview ===
In the central Admission round (Round 3) of the Thai University Central Admission System (TCAS) for the 2026 intake (TCAS69), Chulalongkorn University offered 4,537 places across 69 programmes and received 52,359 applications, about 11.5 applications per place. About 8.6 percent of applications succeeded, (Note: Calculated from the programme-level figures in the source tables. Success rate is the number of applicants selected divided by the number of applications. Because applicants may rank several programmes, these figures count applications, not individual people. Where a programme lists several exam options or patterns, the applications of each row are summed, so an applicant who applied under more than one option is counted more than once.) compared with about 11.0 percent across all Thai institutions in the same round. (Note: National totals were calculated by adding the programme-level figures for every institution in the source, counting each programme's applications once. They are approximate.) Chulalongkorn received roughly 5.7 percent of all applications nationally while offering about 2.9 percent of all places, and it filled about 99.5 percent of its places, whereas about one-third of places nationwide went unfilled.

=== Admission system ===
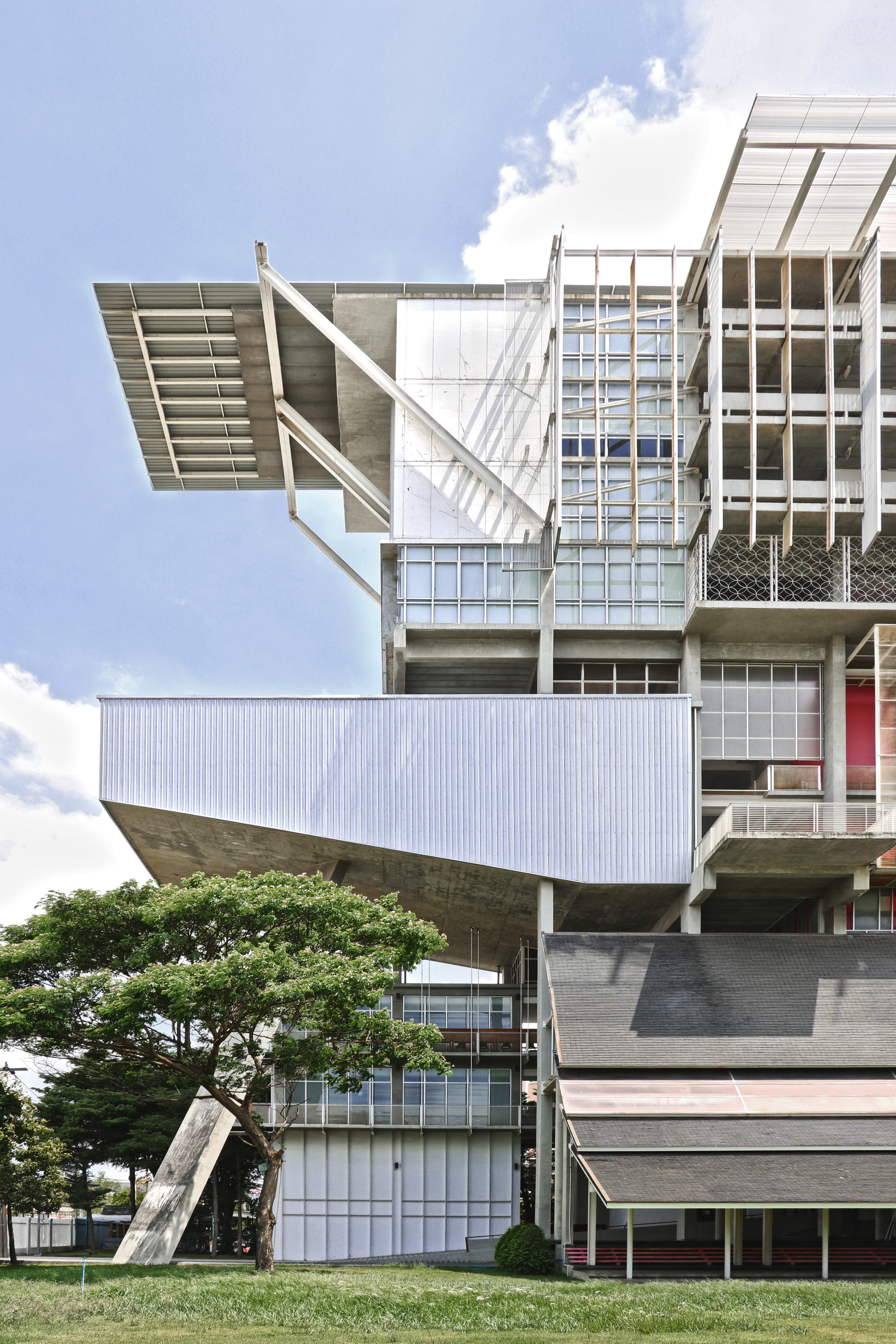
Chula Pat 13 Building (Lecture Hall) Sabbasastravicaya Building (Research Building) Baromratchakumari Building, Faculty of Arts

TCAS is the national system through which Thai universities select undergraduates in several rounds. In Round 3, applicants apply through the mytcas.com portal and rank several programmes. Universities select applicants using standardised national test scores, such as TGAT/TPAT or A-Level, together with school grade point average, according to weightings set by each programme. Because applicants may rank several choices, the published application counts measure applications rather than individual people, and success rates per application therefore understate the share of applicants who obtain a place somewhere.

=== Competitive programmes ===
Competitiveness varies widely by programme. The table lists selected programmes at Chulalongkorn in Round 3 of TCAS66 (the 2023 intake). In each, the number of applicants selected equalled the number of places.

Selected programmes, TCAS66 Round 3 (2023 intake)
Programme	Places	Applications	Success rate
Science (Computer Science)	24	2,695	0.9%
Arts (Information Studies)	10	824	1.2%
Education (Secondary, English major)	16	1,288	1.2%
Political Science (International Relations)	66	4,641	1.4%
Psychology (all three patterns)	57	2,896	2.0%
Allied Health Sciences (Physical Therapy)	60	2,834	2.1%
Science (Microbiology)	34	1,426	2.4%
Arts (Geography and Geoinformatics)	12	449	2.7%
Accounting (two patterns)	260	6,297	4.1%
Engineering (Computer Engineering)	65	1,422	4.6%
Business Administration (two patterns)	260	5,609	4.6%
Communication Arts (all exam options)	85	1,721	4.9%
Law (all exam options)	250	3,173	7.9%
Economics	140	1,333	10.5%

The lowest success rates occur where few places meet a large applicant pool. For example, Computer Science in the Faculty of Science offered 24 places and received 2,695 applications.

International Relations. The International Relations major in the Faculty of Political Science illustrates how demand concentrates. In 2023 (TCAS66) it offered 66 places in Round 3 and recorded 4,641 applications across its entrance-exam options, about 70 per place, so only about 1.4 percent of applications succeeded. Most applicants chose the Thai-language option: 3,542 applied and 39 were admitted. The lowest composite score among admitted applicants ranged from about 75 to 79 depending on the option. In 2026 (TCAS69) the programme again offered 66 places and recorded 1,621 applications (about 4.1 percent success), with minimum admitted scores of about 74 to 78. The two years are not directly comparable, since the TCAS66 figures are counted per exam option and the TCAS69 figures per programme.

== International outlook ==
Chulalongkorn University maintains international academic partnerships through its Office of International Affairs and Global Network. Its international activities include student and staff exchanges, collaborative research, international degree programmes, and partnerships with universities and academic organizations worldwide.

According to the university's 2025 international programmes fact sheet, Chulalongkorn offered 126 international programmes and enrolled 2,358 international students. The same fact sheet reported partnerships with 593 institutions in 58 countries and 962 academic and student or staff exchange agreements.

The university participates in international higher-education networks, including the Association of Pacific Rim Universities (APRU), the ASEAN University Network (AUN), the Asian Universities Alliance (AUA), the Association of Southeast Asian Institutions of Higher Learning (ASAIHL), and the ASEAN-European Academic University Network (ASEA-UNINET). These networks provide frameworks for academic cooperation, research collaboration, student mobility and the exchange of institutional practices.

Internationalization is also reflected in the university's degree offerings. Its international programmes span disciplines including engineering, economics, business, political science, international development, public health, architecture and the humanities. Selected programmes offer joint or double degrees with partner institutions overseas, enabling students to undertake parts of their studies through international academic collaborations.

Through these partnerships and programmes, Chulalongkorn University connects Thai higher education with regional and international academic communities. Its international engagement encompasses both the recruitment of overseas students to Thailand and opportunities for Thai students and staff to study, conduct research and collaborate abroad.

== Research ==
Chulalongkorn University conducts research across the natural sciences, engineering, medicine, social sciences, humanities and interdisciplinary fields. Its research infrastructure includes specialized research institutes, centers of excellence and research units that support collaboration between academic disciplines and engagement with government, industry and international partners.

The university's research institutes cover a range of national and regional priorities, including energy policy, environmental sustainability, marine resources, biotechnology, materials science, transportation and logistics, social development and Asian studies. Its principal research institutes include:

- Aquatic Resources Research Institute
- Energy Research Institute
- Sustainable Environment Research Institute
- Social Research Institute
- Institute of Biotechnology and Genetic Engineering
- Metallurgy and Materials Science Research Institute
- Institute of Asian Studies
- Institute of Thai Studies
- Transportation Institute

The institutes undertake research and academic services in areas such as marine conservation and aquaculture, renewable energy and climate change, environmental management, social inequality and sustainable development, genetic engineering, materials technology, Asian regional affairs, Thai studies, and transport and logistics systems. The Institute of Asian Studies also hosts research initiatives focused on topics including migration, China, the Mekong region, Muslim communities and Japan.

In addition to its institutes, the university supports interdisciplinary research through centers of excellence and research units. These include work on marine biotechnology, genomics and precision dentistry, catalysis, green materials, biosensors, sustainable biotechnology, food and water safety, and railway infrastructure. The university organizes its broader research activities around themes such as food and agriculture, net-zero development, sustainable society, health and well-being, industrial technology, and disaster and environmental research.

== Scholarships ==
Chulalongkorn University offers scholarships and financial assistance to support students pursuing undergraduate and postgraduate education. Funding opportunities vary by academic programme, degree level and eligibility, and include tuition support, research funding and scholarships for international students.

The Chulalongkorn Leaders in International Networks and Knowledge (Chula LINK) Scholarship supports eligible international students pursuing master's and doctoral degrees. Its announced benefits include tuition fees, a monthly living allowance and round-trip airfare. The university also offers graduate scholarships for students from ASEAN and non-ASEAN countries, as well as research funding through programmes such as the Second Century Fund (C2F).

Scholarships are also available through selected international undergraduate programmes, with awards and eligibility criteria varying by programme. In addition, exchange students from partner institutions may participate in one- or two-semester exchanges under agreements that waive tuition fees at Chulalongkorn University, although students remain responsible for living and other personal expenses.

== International student life ==
Chulalongkorn University offers international degree programmes, exchange opportunities and student services intended to support students from overseas. A university fact sheet published in 2025 listed 126 international programmes, 2,358 international students, and 593 partner institutions in 58 countries. The university also reported 962 academic and student or staff exchange agreements, reflecting its network of international academic partnerships.

The university's location in central Bangkok gives students access to the city's public transport, commercial districts, cultural attractions and food scene. International students can use university facilities such as the Central Library, sports complex and co-working spaces, and participate in student clubs and cultural activities. The Office of International Affairs and Global Network organizes orientation programmes to introduce incoming students to university services, Thai culture and opportunities to connect with peers from different countries.

Accommodation and administrative support are available to international students. Chulalongkorn University International House (CU iHOUSE) is a 26-storey residence with 846 units for international students and visiting faculty. The university also provides information and assistance relating to visas, registration, health services and student welfare through its international affairs office and related support units.

== Rankings ==
Chulalongkorn University occupies a leading position in Thailand's higher education sector and maintains a strong regional profile. Ranked 52nd in Asia by QS in 2026 and first nationally in the Times Higher Education World University Rankings 2027, it combines domestic prominence with international recognition. Its varying positions across global rankings reflect differences in their methodologies and the dimensions of university performance they measure.

- In the QS World University Rankings: Asia 2026, the university was ranked 52nd in Asia.
- In the Times Higher Education World University Rankings 2027, Chulalongkorn University was ranked first among Thai universities for the fourth consecutive year.
- In the Center for World University Rankings 2026, the university was ranked 468th globally and first in Thailand.
- In the Academic Ranking of World Universities 2026, published by ShanghaiRanking, Chulalongkorn University was placed in the 601–700 global ranking band.
- In the U.S. News & World Report Best Global Universities Rankings 2026, the university ranked 491st globally and first among Thai universities.

=== Subject rankings ===
In the QS World University Rankings by Subject 2026, released on 25 March 2026, Chulalongkorn was ranked in 60 subjects. It placed first in Thailand in 46 of them (up from 32 in the 2024 edition) and within the world top 200 in 37.

Subjects ranked in the world top 100, QS World University Rankings by Subject 2026
World rank	Subject
32	Dentistry
65	Engineering – Petroleum
71	Engineering – Mineral & Mining
71	Veterinary Science
75	Performing Arts
89	Development Studies
91	Hospitality & Leisure Management
98	English Language & Literature

Broad subject areas, QS 2026
World rank	Broad subject area
118	Arts & Humanities
141	Social Sciences & Management
157	Life Sciences & Medicine
194	Engineering & Technology

== International accreditation ==
Chulalongkorn University has academic programs accredited by international and regional quality-assurance organizations across several disciplines. These include the ASEAN University Network Quality Assurance (AUN-QA) for selected programs in medicine, dentistry, public health and other fields; ABET accreditation for engineering programs, including Nano-Engineering and Aerospace Engineering; and international business-school accreditations held by Chulalongkorn Business School. The latter holds accreditation from AACSB, EQUIS and the Association of MBAs (AMBA), collectively known as the “Triple Crown”. These accreditations apply to specific programs or academic units rather than the university as a whole.

== Campus ==
=== Main campus ===
The university's main campus occupies 637 rai (101.9 ha; 252 acres) in Pathum Wan District, central Bangkok, within a larger 1,153-rai (184.5 ha; 456 acres) landholding. The campus is situated near major commercial and transport hubs, including Siam and Sam Yan, and is accessible from the BTS Skytrain and MRT subway networks. Its location places academic facilities within walking distance of shopping, dining and other urban amenities.

The campus combines academic buildings, research facilities, student residences, sports facilities and green spaces. The university's Central Library provides resources for study and research, while the CU Sports Complex includes indoor sports facilities, swimming pools, tennis courts and fitness areas. The campus also contains historic buildings, including the university auditorium and the monument to Kings Chulalongkorn and Vajiravudh, alongside newer academic and administrative buildings.

A notable green space is Chulalongkorn University Centenary Park, a 28-rai public park opened in 2017 to mark the university's centenary. Designed to provide recreational space while helping manage urban stormwater, the park incorporates a sloping green roof, wetlands and water-retention areas. It serves both the university community and the surrounding public.

The university's wider landholding extends beyond the academic campus. Parts of it are used for commercial and mixed-use developments managed by the Property Management Office, including Siam Square and areas around Sam Yan. These developments connect the university's educational functions with the surrounding urban economy, while the campus itself remains the principal location for teaching, research and student activities.

=== Connectivity ===
Chulalongkorn University is connected to Bangkok's public transportation network through nearby BTS and MRT stations. The BTS stations closest to the campus are Siam and National Stadium, from which passengers can use university shuttle buses to reach different parts of the campus. Sam Yan MRT station is located adjacent to the university's southern area, with Exit 2 providing access to Chamchuri Square, a university-owned building. Underground pedestrian walkways also connect the station area with nearby commercial developments, including Samyan Mitrtown.

The university operates the free electric-powered CU POP BUS shuttle service, which connects campus facilities with nearby transport stations. Passengers can track the shuttle buses' real-time locations through the CU NEX and ViaBus applications. Public buses operated by the Bangkok Mass Transit Authority (BMTA) also serve roads surrounding the campus, including Rama I, Rama IV, Phaya Thai and Henri Dunant roads. Taxis and ride-hailing services, including Grab, provide additional options for travel to specific faculties and buildings within the university.

=== Places and Facilities ===
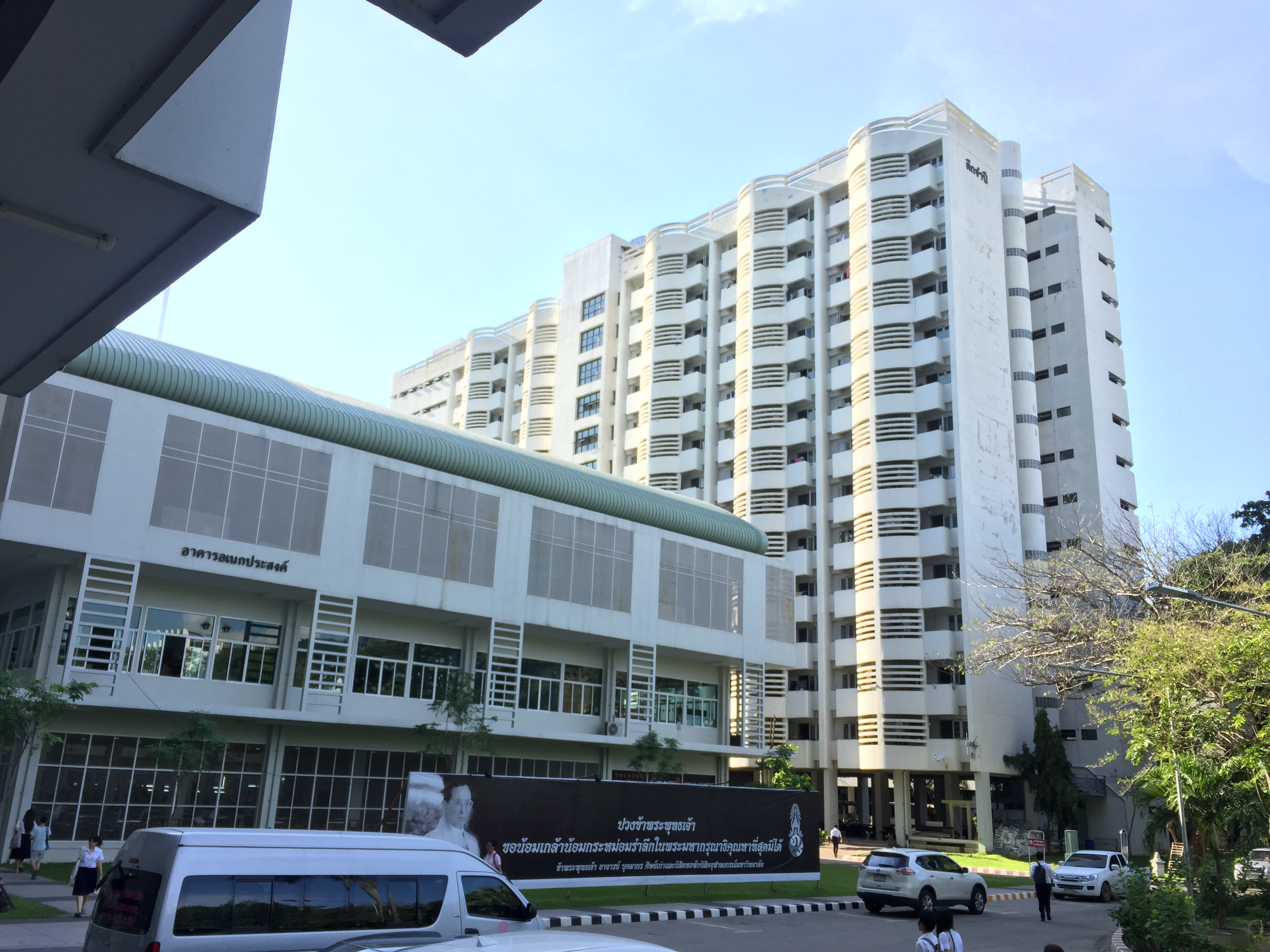
Chulalongkorn University dormitory

==== Chulalongkorn University Centenary Park ====
The west side of Chula's campus is the site of this innovative park. It has gradually sloping portions. Its 28 rai expanse contains a water retention pond with a capacity of 3.8 million liters and a rain garden. Both help to ameliorate Bangkok's seasonal flooding. It was built to commemorate Chula's 100th anniversary in 2017.

==== Accommodation ====
Student accommodation at Chulalongkorn University includes university-operated student dormitories (commonly known in Thai as หอใน, or หอพักนิสิต) and the Chulalongkorn University International House (CU iHouse).

CU iHouse is a 26-storey, 846-unit residential building intended primarily for international students, visiting lecturers and other members of the university community. Its facilities include furnished, air-conditioned rooms, 24-hour reception and security services, study areas, and shuttle bus services connecting residents to university facilities.

The university also operates student dormitories for Thai students, with separate men's and women's residences. These include Chulalongkorn University dormitories such as Champee, Champa, Phuttan, Phutson and Chuan Chom. Accommodation options vary by building, including shared rooms and rooms with air conditioning. The university's student dormitory office administers residence applications and dormitory regulations.

==== Chulalongkorn University Health Service Center (CUHC) ====
Chulalongkorn University provides healthcare services and medical welfare for its students, faculty members and staff through the Chulalongkorn University Health Service Center (CUHSC), located on the second floor of the Chamchuri 9 Building. The center provides primary medical care, general medical consultations, treatment for common illnesses, preventive healthcare and physical rehabilitation, with services supervised by physicians and specialists from King Chulalongkorn Memorial Hospital. Eligible students can access covered medical services free of charge upon presenting their university student identification card.

The center also provides specialized clinics and other services, including dental care and physical therapy, subject to applicable eligibility and appointment requirements. For conditions requiring more advanced treatment, patients may be referred to King Chulalongkorn Memorial Hospital. The university also facilitates access to Thailand's Universal Coverage Scheme for students through the hospital, allowing eligible students to transfer their healthcare registration from their existing provider to King Chulalongkorn Memorial Hospital.

==== Chula Student Wellness (CUSW) ====
Chula Student Wellness (CUSW) is a mental health and well-being center at Chulalongkorn University that provides psychological counselling and psychiatric services for students and university personnel. Its services address concerns including academic difficulties, personal relationships, stress, emotional challenges and behavioural issues, with support provided by professional psychologists and psychiatrists. In addition to individual counselling, the center organizes workshops, educational activities and well-being programmes to promote mental health and personal development. It also provides a dedicated space with reading areas and workstations for students. The center is located on the third floor of the Chamchuri 9 Building.

==== Chulalongkorn University Book Center ====
The Chulalongkorn University Book Center (Chula Book Center) is a university-operated enterprise established on 18 June 1975. It distributes academic textbooks, scholarly publications, general-interest books and educational materials, serving students, academics and the wider public. In addition to its physical bookstores, the center operates an online platform offering printed books, e-books and online courses. In December 2025, it launched CHULA STORE at its Siam Square branch, expanding its activities to include university-branded merchandise, products developed by Chulalongkorn faculty members and student-designed creations. The store also features products inspired by the university's heritage and research innovations, connecting its publishing and retail activities with the university's academic and cultural identity.

== Regional Centers or Permanent Missions ==
=== Chulalongkorn Center for Social Engagement (Nan Province, Northern Thailand) ===
The university's regional engagement in Nan Province focuses on forest restoration, environmental conservation and community-based learning. Through the Rak Nan: Forest Restoration project, CLNR works with local communities, government agencies and other partners to rehabilitate watershed forests and promote environmentally sustainable livelihoods. The project, which reached its ninth year in 2026, builds on the Huai Nam Phia Model, a community-based restoration initiative developed through collaboration between Chulalongkorn University, local authorities and residents. The model has expanded from an initial area of more than 250 rai to over 500 rai, integrating forest restoration, water management and community participation. In addition, the university's climate education initiatives have engaged 13 schools and one community forest in Nan in 2026, involving 441 teachers and students in activities to measure tree growth and calculate carbon sequestration. Four participating schools subsequently submitted applications for certification under Thailand's Low Emission Support Scheme (LESS), covering 722 trees and a reported carbon sequestration volume of 483.758 tonnes of carbon dioxide equivalent.

=== Chulalongkorn Center for Social Engagement (Saraburi Province, Central Thailand) ===
In Saraburi Province, Chulalongkorn University extends its academic and research activities beyond the campus through collaboration with local communities and regional organizations. Its work focuses on applying university knowledge to local environmental management, forest conservation and sustainable community development. One example is a forest restoration and knowledge-exchange project organized by the Center of Learning Network for the Region (CLNR) in Ngio Ngam Subdistrict, Sao Hai District, in July 2025. Conducted in collaboration with local administrative organizations, government agencies, schools and community groups, the project covered a 53-rai community forest and involved approximately 70 participants. It promoted participatory forest management, ecological monitoring and the transfer of knowledge on forest restoration and carbon sequestration, with the aim of strengthening the community's capacity to manage its natural resources over the long term.

== Chulalongkorn University Demonstration School ==
Chulalongkorn University Demonstration School was established on 20 June 1958 as a laboratory school affiliated with the university's Faculty of Education. It provides practical teaching experience for student teachers and serves as a setting for the development and evaluation of educational theories, curricula and teaching methods.

The school promotes student innovation through its Innovation Center, which supports projects in science, technology, health, environmental sustainability, design and the creative economy. Students participate in national and international invention competitions, developing projects that include assistive devices, health-related technologies, educational tools and applications of Thai cultural heritage.

In January 2026, students from the school received more than 30 awards at Thailand Inventors' Day 2026, including a grand prize, gold and silver medals, and special awards associated with eight countries. Their projects included an aromatherapy inhaler, a device using nanotechnology for herbal extraction, and *Khaenova*, an innovation adapting the traditional Thai khaen instrument for contemporary music.

The school's students have also received recognition in international competitions. In 2025, students won the British English Olympics, held in England. In 2026, they received three gold medals and four special awards at the World Genius Convention & Education Expo in Tokyo, Japan, for projects including ready-to-eat rice products and other student-developed innovations.

In September 2025, a delegation from Chulalongkorn University that included students and faculty members from the Demonstration School received more than 40 awards at the International Invention Innovation Competition in Canada (iCAN 2025). The delegation submitted 21 projects and received gold and silver medals and several special awards. These results represented the combined achievements of participating university units and school teams, rather than the Demonstration School alone.

The school has also received visits from prominent international figures. On 13 December 2019, Tim Cook, chief executive officer of Apple Inc., made a private visit to Chulalongkorn University Demonstration Elementary School to observe its teaching and classroom activities.

== Chulalongkorn University and King Chulalongkorn Memorial Hospital ==
King Chulalongkorn Memorial Hospital was established by the Thai Red Cross Society and opened in 1914 in memory of King Chulalongkorn (Rama V). The Faculty of Medicine at Chulalongkorn University was established in 1947, with the hospital serving as its clinical training base. Although the faculty belongs to the university and the hospital remains under the Thai Red Cross Society, the two institutions collaborate in medical education, healthcare and research.

The institutions have contributed to advances in modern Thai medicine, including corneal transplantation, haemodialysis and heart transplantation. More recently, they have developed healthcare innovations such as a robotic system supporting patients receiving radioactive iodine treatment for thyroid cancer, which received a Thailand Public Service Award in 2024, and surface-guided radiotherapy for breast cancer introduced at the hospital in 2026.

== Honorary degrees ==
The university has bestowed honorary degrees on heads of state and other international dignitaries, including two U.S. presidents:

- Lyndon B. Johnson, October 29, 1966
- Bill Clinton, November 26, 1996
- Nelson Mandela, July 17, 1997
- Jigme Khesar Namgyal Wangchuck, December 21, 2025
- Jetsun Pema Wangchuck, December 21, 2025

== Traditions ==
Chulalongkorn University student traditions include:

- Chula–Thammasat Traditional Football Match: The annual football match between Chulalongkorn University and Thammasat University in January at Suphashalasai Stadium. It first started in 1934.
- Loy Krathong: an annual celebration of the full moon night, which usually falls on the first full moon day in November. Since the festival is open to the public, it attracts many people, especially Chulalongkorn students and faculty and those who live in downtown Bangkok, to come to the university to float their krathongs on the university's pond.
- Chulalongkorn Academic Exhibition: a triennial academic and research exhibition presented by Chulalongkorn University's students and faculty. It is regarded as one of the most important academic fairs in Thailand.

== Student activities and clubs ==
The university is host to 40 student clubs, including the Buddhism and Traditions Club, the Religious Studies Club, the Mind Study Club, and the Thai Classical Music Club. Chulalongkorn also has a Morals Network, which actively campaigns to protect student activities from damaging the university's reputation. The university's student government annually organizes the Chula-Thammasat traditional football match jointly with the Chulalongkorn University Alumni Association.

The Student Union of Chulalongkorn University is the primary student organization. It is made up of the Student Government and the Student Council. The Student Government acts as the executive branch of the Student Union, while the Student Council acts as the legislative branch of the Student Union. The Student Union was created by the enactment of the Chulalongkorn University Rules Regarding the Student Union of Chulalongkorn University B.E. 2529 by the Chulalongkorn University Council in their 444th meeting.

The Student Government is managed by an assembly of 30 students. Direct elections by all students fill 10 of these positions, including that of the President of the Student Government. The remaining 20 positions are occupied by the heads of the student unions from each faculty. The Student Government acts as the executive branch of the Student Union.

The Student Council comprises 60 full members, with three representatives elected from each faculty. The President of the Student Council is then chosen indirectly by these elected council members. In addition, 20 associate members are elected from first-year students in each faculty to join the Council after the start of an academic year. These associate members cannot vote in the plenary sitting of the council. The Student Council acts as the legislative branch of the Student Union.

== Student outcomes ==
Chulalongkorn University conducts annual surveys of employers to assess the performance of its graduates across faculties and academic levels. The surveys collect evaluations from supervisors of Chulalongkorn graduates and are used to inform curriculum development and improvements in teaching. The university published its employer satisfaction survey reports for the 2023, 2024 and 2025 reporting years, with the latest report released in June 2026.

In the university's survey of employers of graduates from the 2023 academic year, Chulalongkorn recorded an overall employer satisfaction score of 4.47 out of 5. The survey covered 9,475 graduates and received 1,818 responses, representing a response rate of 19.19%. Satisfaction scores varied by qualification level: doctoral graduates received an average score of 4.69, master's graduates 4.56, and bachelor's graduates 4.39.

In the QS World University Rankings 2026, Chulalongkorn received a score of 96.4 out of 100 for the Employment Outcomes indicator. The indicator considers graduate employability and alumni impact; it is a composite ranking score rather than the percentage of graduates who secure employment.

== Notable alumni ==
=== Royal family ===
- Princess Maha Chakri Sirindhorn — Thai princess, scholar, author and recipient of numerous academic distinctions.
- Princess Sirivannavari Nariratana Rajakanya — Thai princess, fashion designer and equestrian.

=== Politics and public service ===
- Paetongtarn Shinawatra — former prime minister of Thailand.

== International achievements ==
Students, researchers, and performing arts groups associated with Chulalongkorn University have received recognition in international competitions across technology, business, scientific innovation, and music.

- In 2016, Team PH21, comprising students from the university's Department of Computer Engineering, won first place in the Games category of the Microsoft Imagine Cup with Timelie, a stealth puzzle game. The team received a US$50,000 prize and advanced to the competition's overall championship round.
- In 2014, the Chulalongkorn University Concert Choir received a gold medal at the 12th Venezia in Musica international choral competition in Italy. The choir also qualified as a finalist in the Grand Prize round.
- In 2022, the university's Engineering Innovator Club (EIC Chula) robotics team placed second in the Open Platform League of the RoboCup@Home competition with Walkie, an autonomous service robot designed to perform everyday domestic tasks.
- In 2025, a team from Chulalongkorn Business School's international BBA programme won the gold award and the runner-up prize in the Grand Competition at the Global Brand Planning Competition in Singapore. A separate team involving students from the Faculty of Communication Arts received a silver award. The competition featured 21 teams from universities around the world.
- In 2025, Nisaphat Tangpanitanon, a doctoral student in the university's Technology Management and Innopreneurship programme, won a gold medal at the International Competition on Science, Technology, Engineering and Mathematics (ICSEM) in Malaysia for her project, English Learning Platform Evaluation.
- In 2025, Chulalongkorn faculty members and students from Chulalongkorn University Demonstration School received more than 40 awards at the International Invention Innovation Competition (iCAN) in Canada. The awards included 11 gold medals, 10 silver medals, and 25 special awards, as well as awards for invention videos, young inventors, and invention design.
- In 2026, the Chulada Choir of Chulalongkorn University Demonstration Secondary School won a gold medal in the Youth Choirs of Equal Voices category and a silver medal in the Sacred Choral Music a Cappella category at the 14th World Choir Games in Helsingborg, Sweden. It was the first secondary-school choir from Thailand to win a gold medal at the competition.
- In 2025, Chulalongkorn University's digital medical education platform, MedUMORE, won the Technological or Digital Innovation of the Year category at the Times Higher Education Awards Asia 2025. The platform subsequently received the Aspire-to-Excellence Award from the International Association for Health Professions Education (AMEE) in 2025.
- In 2025, Chulalongkorn researchers received three awards at the Seoul International Invention Fair. The projects included an environmentally friendly canine cardiopulmonary resuscitation training mannequin, an early-childhood educational activity kit, and a mandala-based creative learning kit.
- In 2025, Korarith Chuaysakul, a student at Chulalongkorn University, represented Thailand as a youth delegate at the 4th ASEAN Youth Dialogue and participated in the ASEAN Leaders' Interface with ASEAN Youth during the 46th ASEAN Summit in Kuala Lumpur, Malaysia. The dialogue provided a platform for youth representatives to contribute recommendations on regional priorities, including education, climate action, sustainability, and social inclusion.
- In 2025, “Smart Salt,” a low-sodium salt innovation developed by Chulalongkorn alumnus and doctoral candidate Paul Patsapong Chomchey, received a gold medal and a special award at the Silicon Valley International Invention Festival. The product uses nano-chitosan technology to reduce sodium while preserving flavour.
- In 2026, a team from Chulalongkorn University's Faculty of Engineering placed third in the 30k COTS category at the International Rocket Engineering Competition in Texas, United States. The team, known as CUHAR, competed among 141 university teams and launched its CURSR-V rocket to an altitude of 30,683 feet.
- In 2026, a research team from the Faculty of Engineering and the Chulalongkorn School of Integrated Innovation received a gold award and three special awards at the World Genius Convention & Education Expo in Japan for an artificial-intelligence-powered dashboard designed to analyse public communications during earthquake response operations.
- In 2026, a team from the Faculty of Veterinary Science received a gold medal and two special awards at the International Invention Innovation Competition in Canada for an interactive three-dimensional simulator designed to teach the digestive anatomy of ruminants.
- In 2026, a faculty member from Chulalongkorn University's Faculty of Dentistry received first prize in the international research category at the ARISTOTLE International Oral & Medical Sciences Innovation & Creativity Research Competition in Taipei, Taiwan, for research on a bioinstructive dental material intended to support dentine-pulp regeneration.

== See also ==
- Academic dress of Chulalongkorn University
- Sasin Graduate Institute of Business Administration of Chulalongkorn University
- Education in Thailand
- Chula United football club
- Education for Liberation of Siam
