= Royal Staff =

One of the Royal Regalia of Thailand

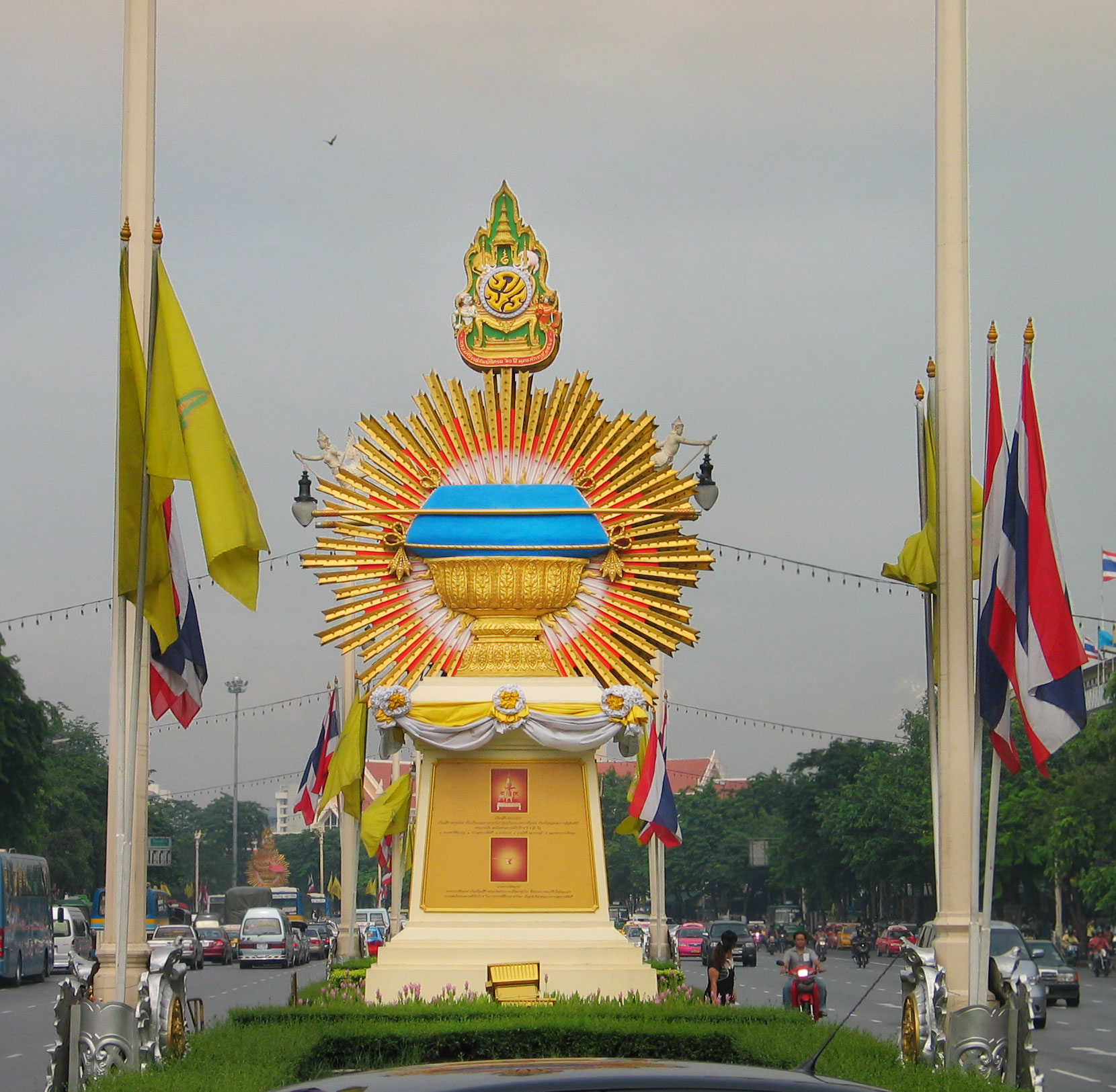
The Royal Staff exhibit on Ratchadamnoen Avenue in Bangkok showing the Royal Thai Regalia in honour of the 60th anniversary of King Bhumibol Adulyadej's ascension to the throne in 2006.

The royal staff or Than Phra Kon (Thai: ธารพระกร) is one of the five royal regalia of the King of Thailand. The staff is made of cassia wood and enclosed at both ends in gold. It has a length of 118 cm (46 in). One end has a knob and there are three tines at the foot. The royal staff is used as a symbol of regal authority as in other cultures around the world, and is associated in Thailand with the guiding of the king's footsteps down the path of justice and equity.

== See also ==
- Great Crown of Victory
- Royal Nine-Tiered Umbrella
- Sword of Victory
- Coronation of the Thai monarch
