= Sword of Victory =

One of the Royal Regalia of Thailand

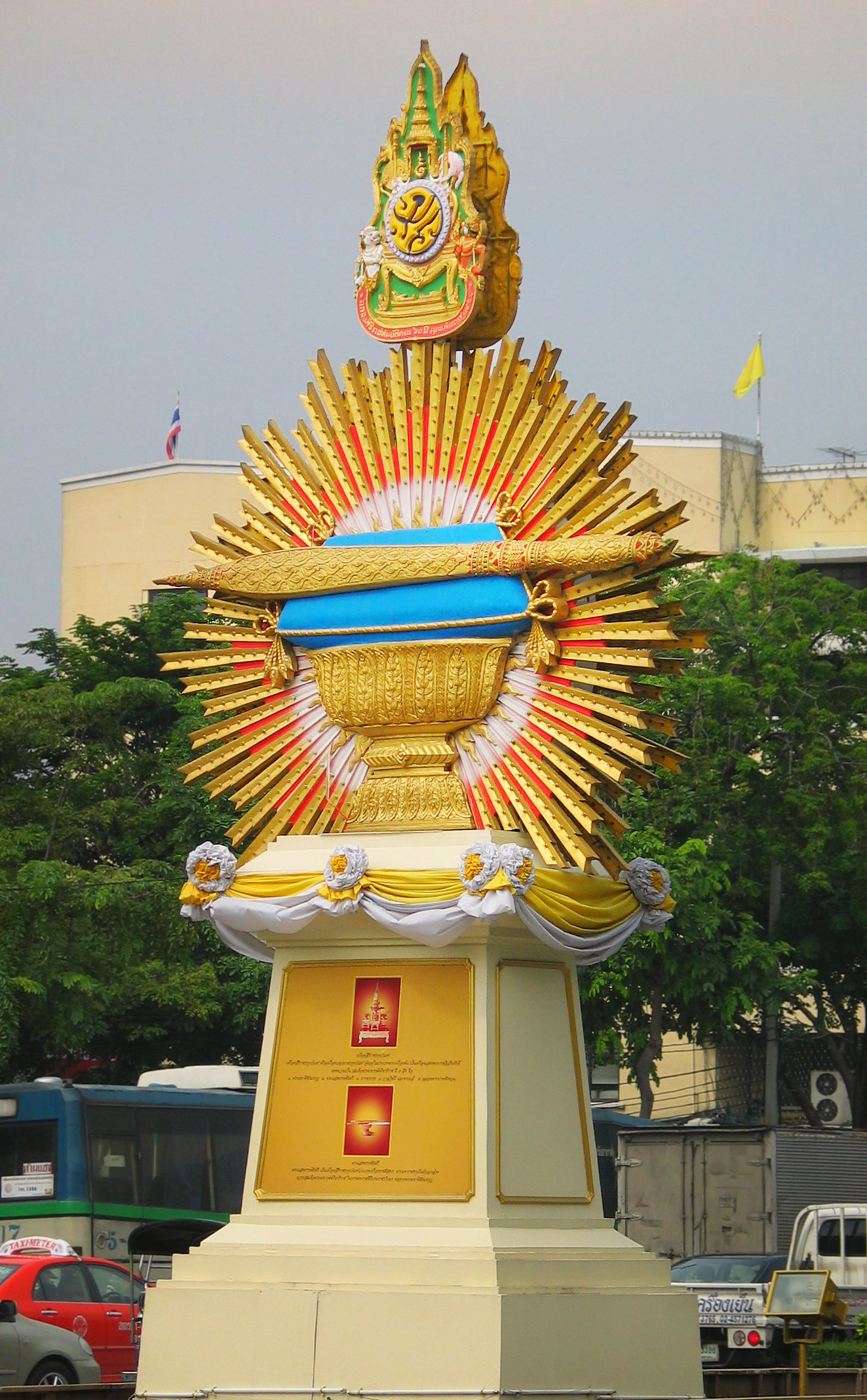
The Sword of Victory exhibit on Ratchadamnoen Avenue in Bangkok showing the Royal Thai Regalia in honour of the 60th anniversary of King Bhumibol Adulyadej's ascension to the throne in 2006.

Phra Saeng Khan Chai Si or Phra Saeng Khan Chai Sri (Thai: พระแสงขรรค์ชัยศรี, the "Venerable Sword of Victory", "Great Sword of Victory" (Note: "Phra" is a royal honorific prefix.)) is part of the royal regalia of the King of Thailand. The sword represents the military might and power of the king. The hilt has a length of 25.4 centimetres (10 inches) with the blade measuring 64.5 centimetres (25 inches). When placed in the scabbard the sword has a total length of 101 centimetres (40 inches) and weighs 1.9 kilograms (4.2 pounds). The sword’s neck between the blade and the hilt is decorated with a gold inlaid miniature of Vishnu riding the Garuda.

== History ==
The sword was found in 1784 by a fisherman in Cambodia who found it in his fishing net (in Tonle Sap) at Siem Riep, and Chao Phraya Uthai Phubet who ruled presented it to Phutthayotfa Chulalok (Rama I) of Thailand, (Note: Note that "The Royal Regalia Phra Maha Phichai Mongkut (The Great Crown of Victory).. was made during the reign of King Rama I".) his suzerain at the time. According to legend, it was said that the moment the blade arrived in Bangkok, seven lightning strikes hit the city simultaneously, including the city gate (Wiset Chaisi), where the blade entered, and over the main gate of the Grand Palace (Phiman Chaisi).

During the coronation ceremony the king is handed the sword by a Brahmin, then straps it onto his belt himself. The sword features heavily in the Oath of Allegiance Ceremony where the King ceremoniously dips the sword into a bowl of sacred water, and then drinks the water as an example, followed by senior civil servants and military officers as a sign of allegiance to the institution of the monarchy.

== See also ==
- Great Crown of Victory
- Royal Nine-Tiered Umbrella
- Royal Staff
- Coronation of the Thai monarch
- Thuận Thiên (sword) – Mythical sword of the Vietnamese Emperor Lê Lợi (r. 1428-33)
