= Royal Nine-Tiered Umbrella =

Royal umbrella as symbol of a fully crowned king in Thailand

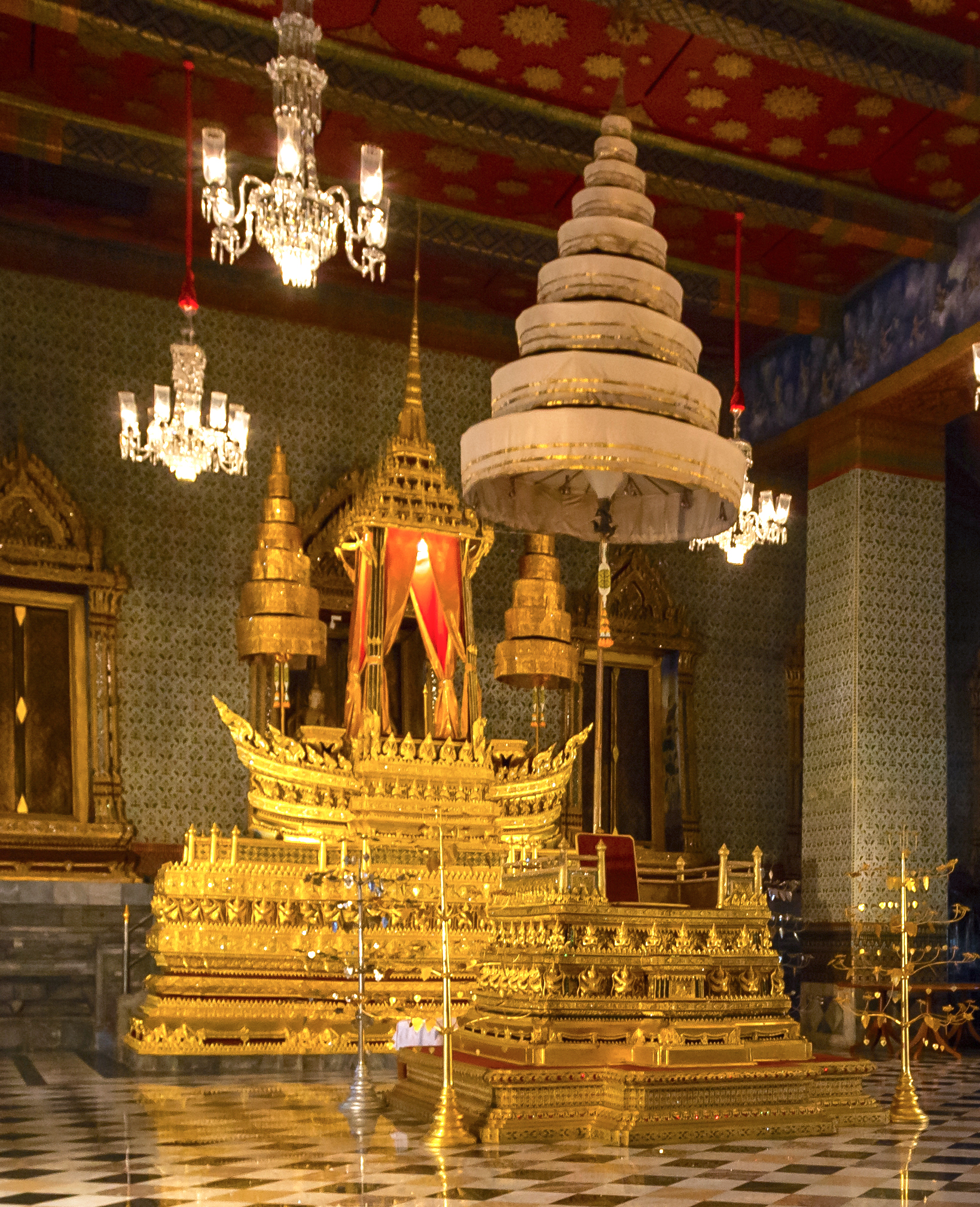
The Royal Nine-Tiered Umbrella over the Phuttan Kanchanasinghat Throne at the Amarin Winitchai Throne Hall, the Grand Palace.

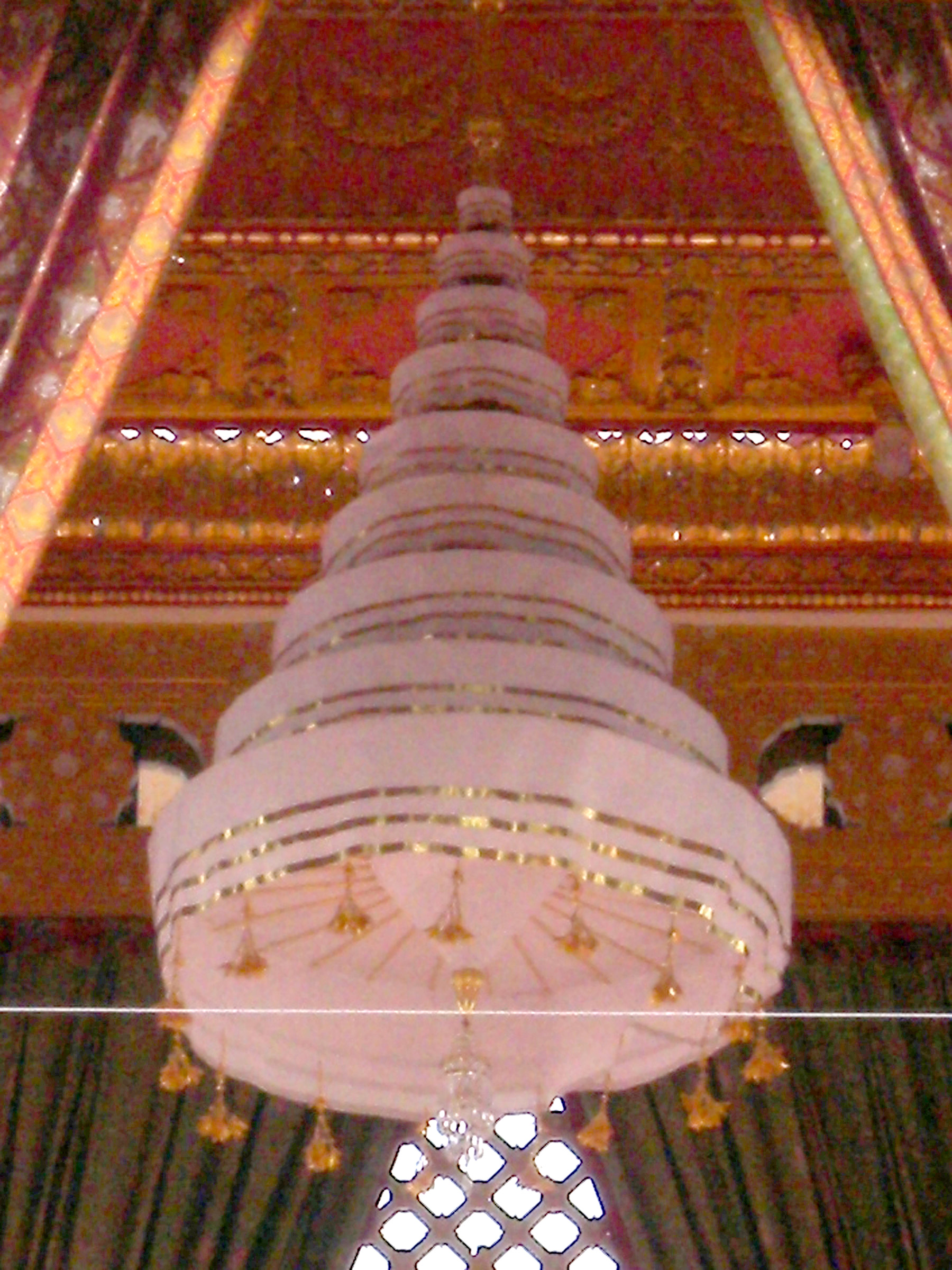
The Royal Nine-Tiered Umbrella over the funeral pyre of King Bhumibol Adulyadej, inside the royal crematorium at Sanam Luang (2017).

The Royal Nine-Tiered Umbrella (Thai: นพปฎลมหาเศวตฉัตร: Nopphapadon Mahasawettachat, officially called the Nine-Tiered Great White Umbrella of State) is considered the most sacred and ancient of the royal regalia of Thailand. A royal umbrella (also called a chatra) consists of many tiers, five for the prince, seven for the crown prince (or the viceroy) and unconsecrated king, and nine for a fully sovereign and crowned Thai king. Until the coronation rites are completed, the new king will not be able to sit on the throne under the nine-tiered umbrella.

== Description ==
The umbrella's shades are made of white silk trimmed with gold, attached to a gilded golden stem. The umbrellas are usually displayed above an important throne in the royal palace (similar to a baldachin). The umbrellas themselves are considered sacred objects and receive offerings from the king on the anniversary of his coronation day. There are currently seven such umbrellas, with six distributed at the various throne halls in the Grand Palace and one in the Dusit Palace. Derived from ancient Hindu beliefs, the umbrella symbolises the spiritual and physical protection the king can give to his subjects. The multiple tiers symbolise the accumulation of honour and merit the king may possess. During the coronation ceremony of the Thai monarch, at one point before the king is crowned, the Chief Court Brahmin will approach the king and hand him the nine-tiered white umbrella. The king will accept it and hand it over to a royal page, who will position it above the throne that the king will sit on to be crowned. A mantra is then invoked by the other Brahmins, to fanfare and music.

On the anniversary of the king's coronation day, a public holiday called the Coronation Day (วันฉัตรมงคล: Wan Chantra Mongkol) or literally 'the day of the blessing of the umbrella' is celebrated in Thailand. The day will involve the king himself carrying out certain rites in remembrance of his consecration. The main ceremony being a benediction service by monks inside the Amarin Winitchai throne hall, where the royal regalia, royal utensils and royal weapons are displayed on the Phuttan Kanchanasinghat Throne. The court Brahmin would then chant a mantra, in the presence of the king, and perform a circumambulation of the nine-tiered umbrella. Gold and silver flowers will then be offered to the spirits protecting the throne, followed by the tying of a strip of red cloth around the umbrella's stem and ending the service by the sprinkling of lustral water on the royal regalia. For King Bhumibol Adulyadej the celebration usually involves a general audience, where he would appear in state seated on the throne under the nine-tiered umbrella to receive well wishes. After his death the public holiday (on 5 May) was cancelled by the government.

== Location ==
There are currently eight umbrellas, six in the Grand Palace and two in the Dusit Palace.

1. Amarin Winitchai Throne Hall; above the Phuttan Kanchanasinghat Throne
2. Phaisan Thaksin Throne Hall; above the Phatharabit Throne
3. Chakkraphat Phiman Residential Hall; above the Royal canopy bed
4. Also in the Chakkraphat Phiman Residential Hall; above the Royal couch
5. Dusit Maha Prasat Throne Hall; usually above the Mother-of-Pearl Throne
6. Chakri Maha Prasat Throne Hall; above the Bhudthan Thom Throne
7. Ananta Samakhom Throne Hall; Dusit Palace; above the Royal Throne
8. Amphorn Sathan Residential Hall; Dusit Palace; above the Royal Throne

== Gallery ==
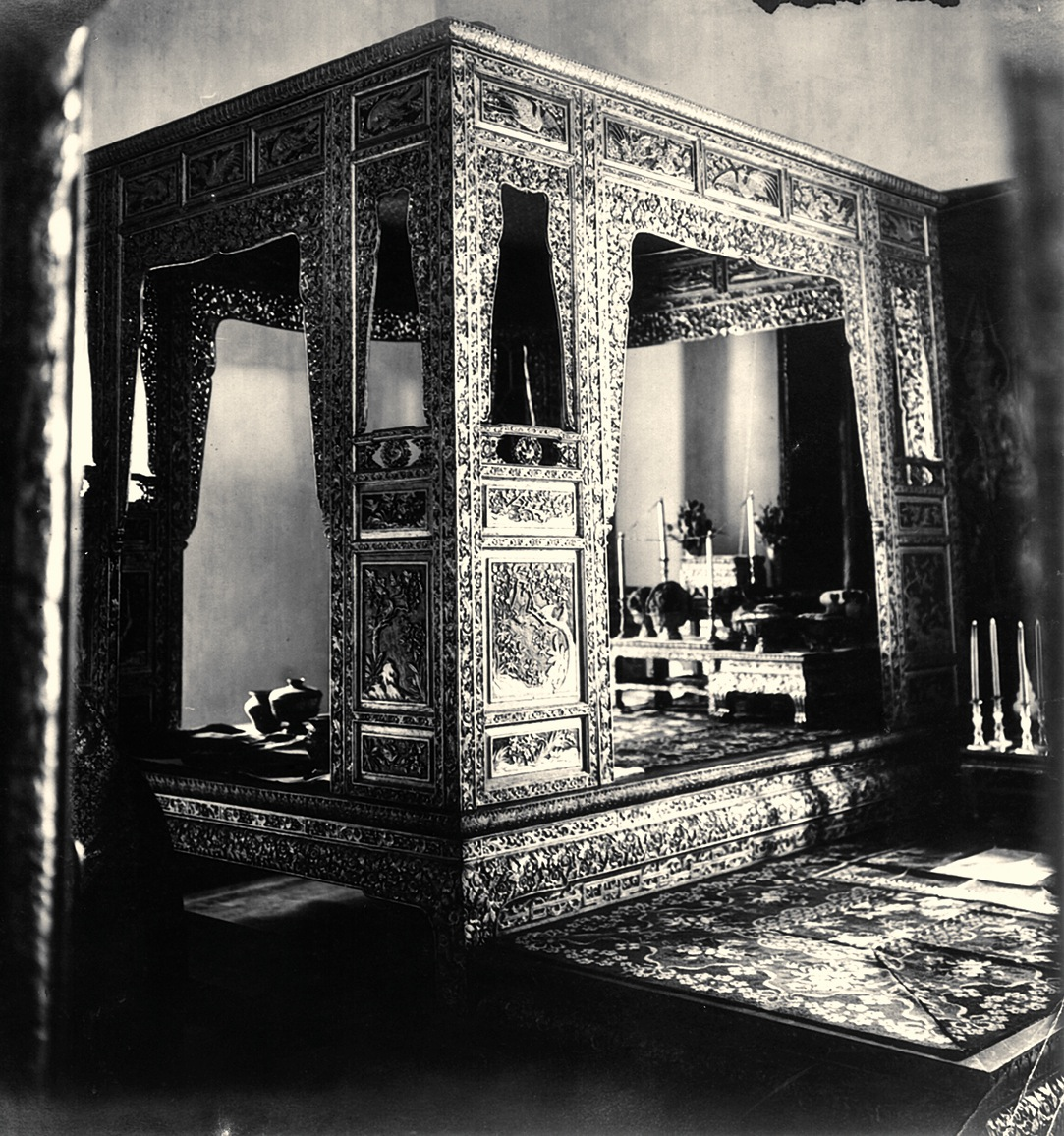
Chakkraphat Phiman Residential Hall: Canopy bed of King Rama I, an umbrella hangs over this bed

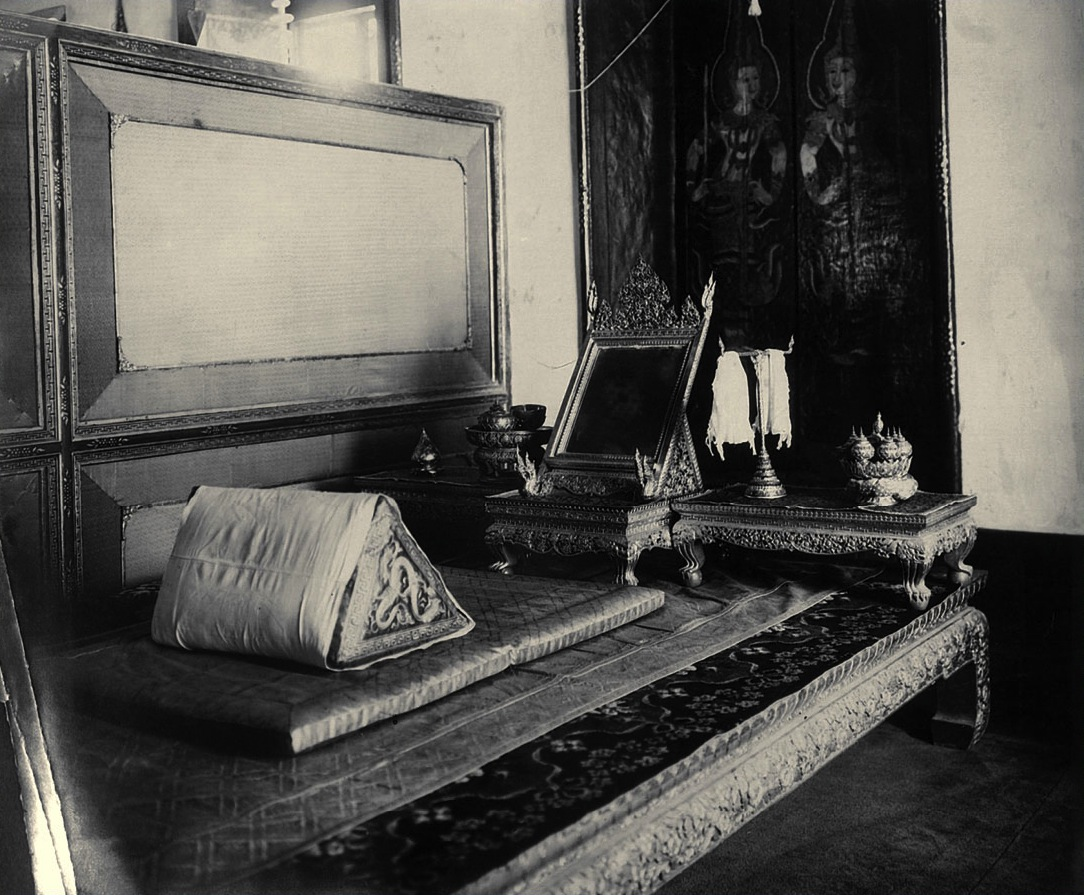
Chakkraphat Phiman Residential Hall: Royal couch of King Rama I, another umbrella hangs over this room

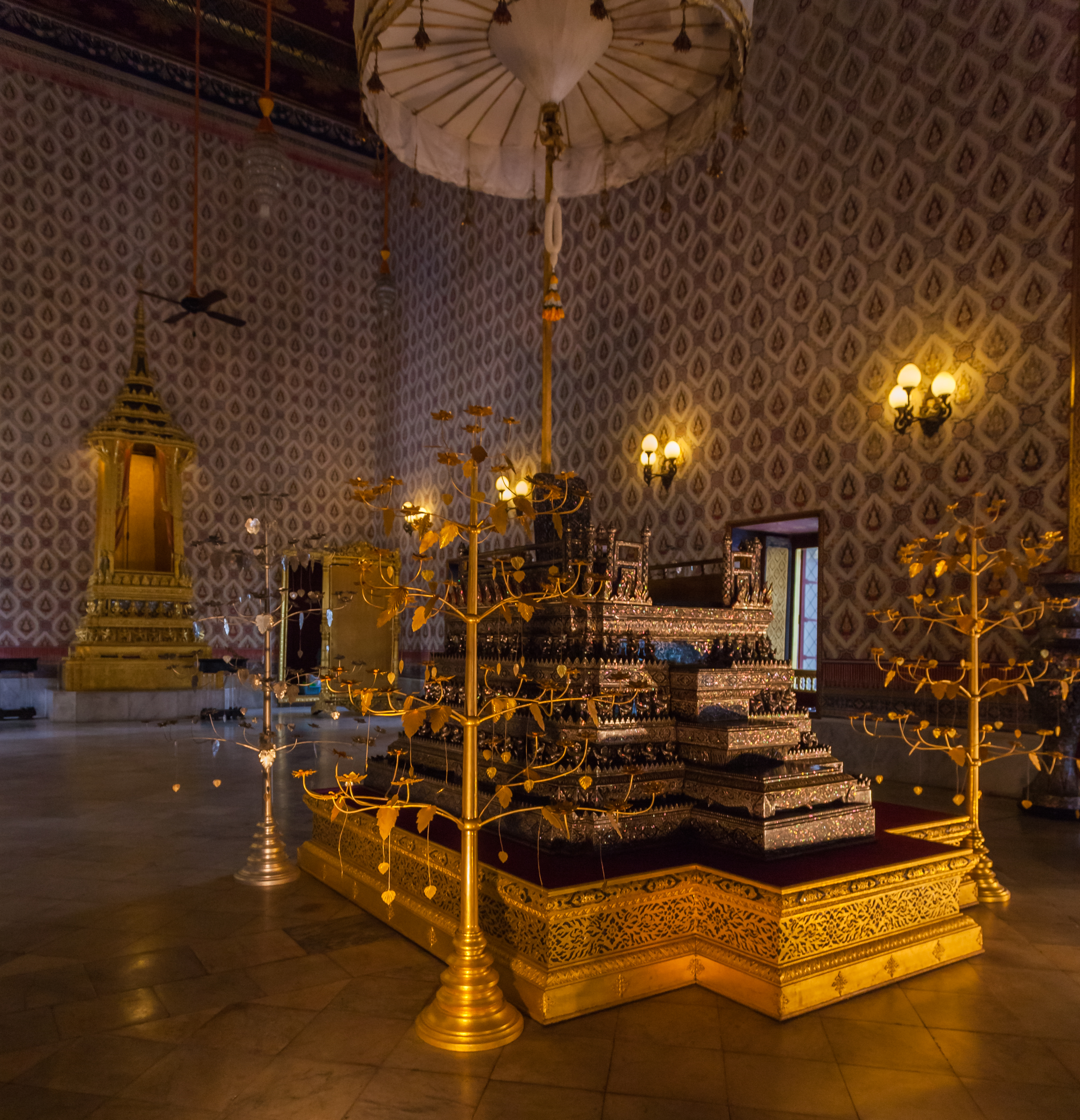
Dusit Maha Prasat Throne Hall: Umbrella over the Mother-of-Pearl Throne in the Dusit Maha Prasat Hall

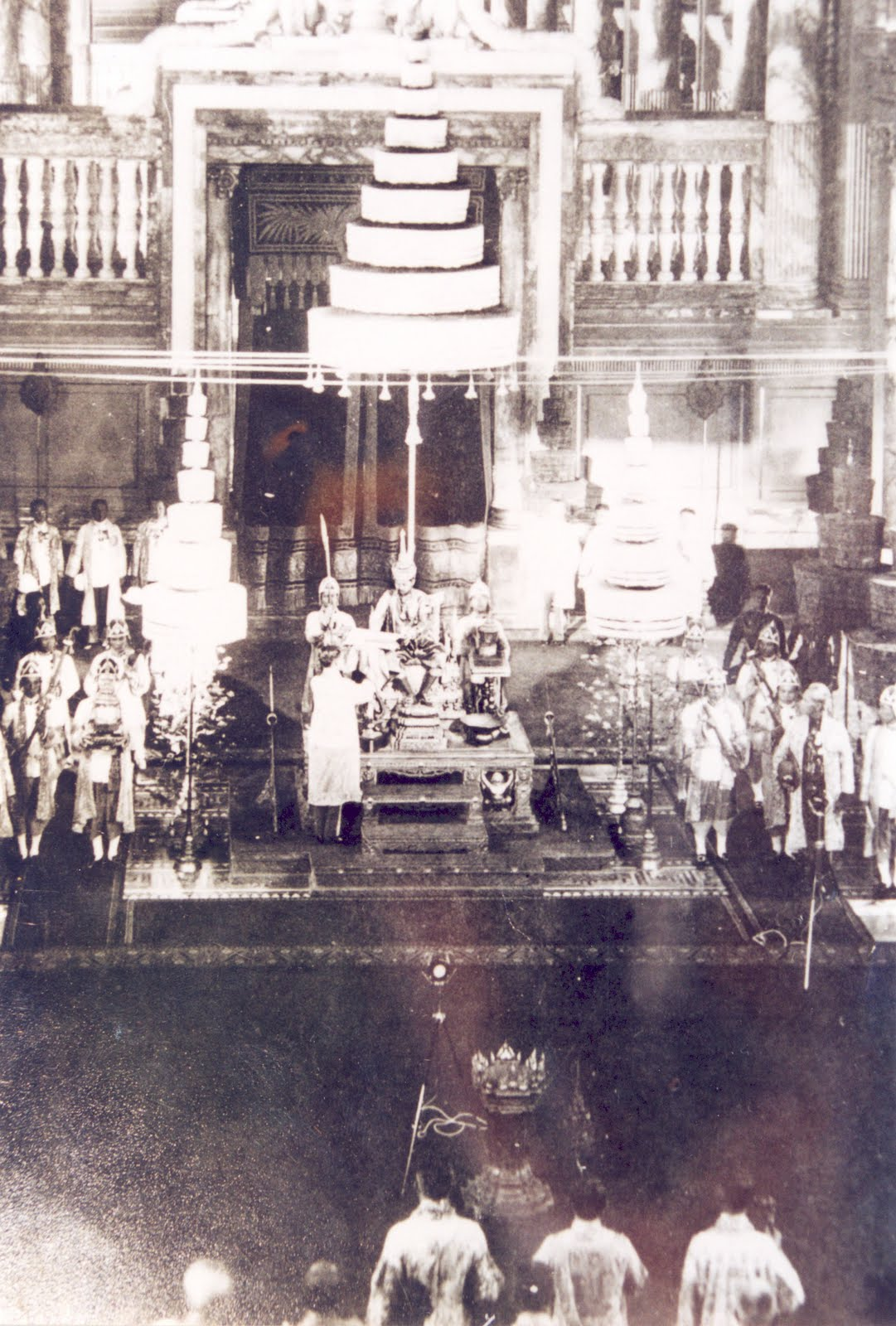
Ananta Samakhom Throne Hall: King Prajadhipok signing the first constitution of Siam on 10 December 1932

== See also ==
- Hti
- Great Crown of Victory
- Sword of Victory
- Royal Staff
- Coronation of the Thai monarch
- Monarchy of Thailand
- Chatra (umbrella)
