= 60th Anniversary Celebrations of Bhumibol Adulyadej's Accession =

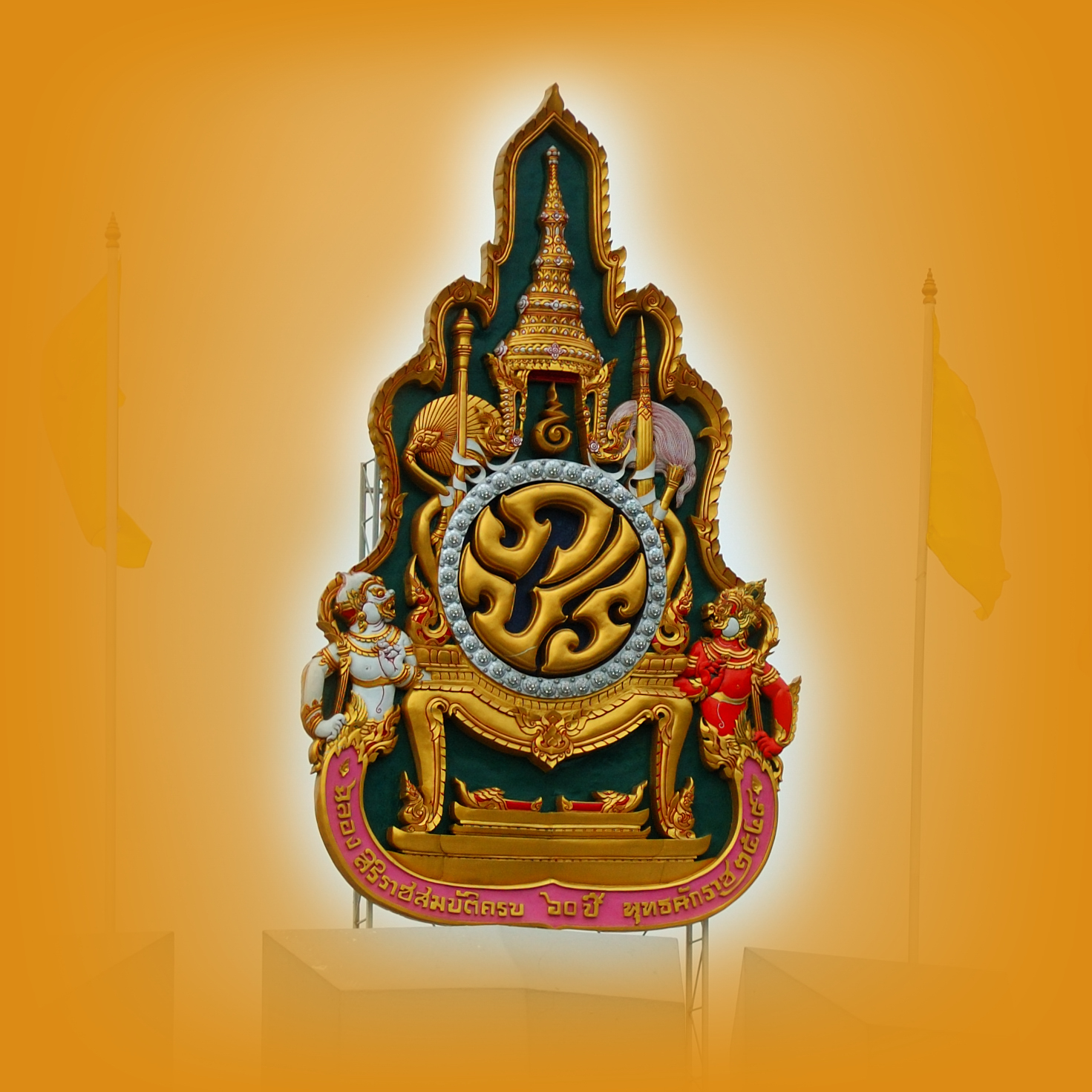
The emblem for the 60th Anniversary Celebration of the King's Accession to the Throne

The Sixtieth Anniversary Celebrations of King Bhumibol Adulyadej's Accession to the Throne (Thai: พระราชพิธีฉลองสิริราชสมบัติครบ ๖๐ ปี พุทธศักราช ๒๕๔๙; RTGS: Phra Ratcha Piti Chalong Siriratchasombat Khrop Hok Sip Pi Phuttha Sakkarat Song Phan Ha Roi Si Sip Kao) were the celebrations held throughout Thailand in 2006 to celebrate King Bhumibol Adulyadej's 60 years on the throne. The celebrations were arranged by the Royal Thai Government with Thaksin Shinawatra as Prime Minister, and attended by representatives of other monarchies.

== Official emblem ==
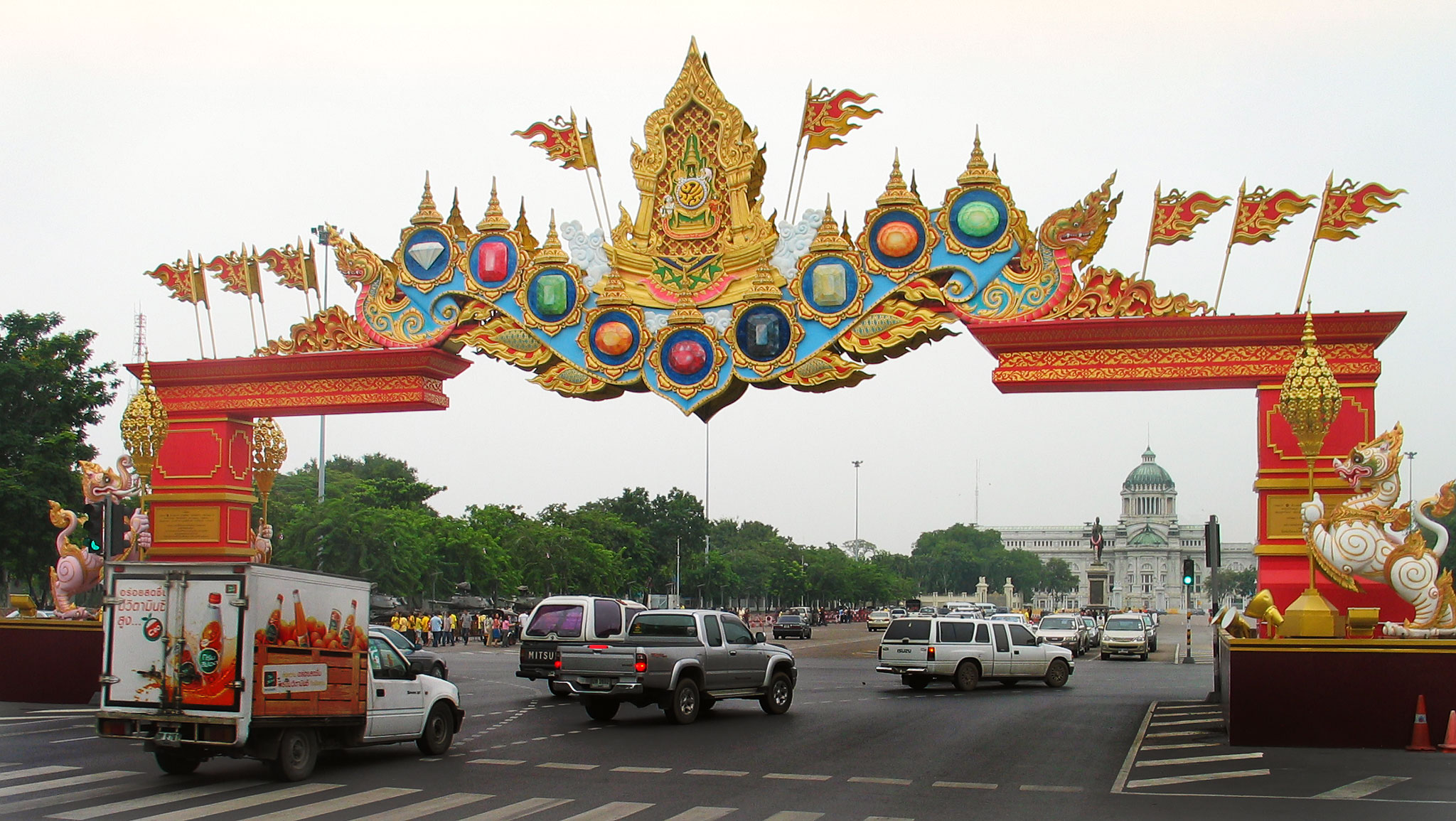
"The Nine Gems", one of several arches over Ratchadamnoen Avenue in Bangkok in honour of the 60th anniversary of H.M. King Bhumibol Adulyadej's ascension to the throne

Conmemorative Medal Ribbon

King Bhumibol selected one of twelve designs presented by the Fine Arts Department of the Ministry of Culture to be the official emblem for the celebrations. The emblem selected was designed by department artist Somchai Supphalakamphaiphon.

There are several symbols in the emblem. The centerpiece is a cypher of the king's name in golden yellow, the colour of Monday, his day of birth. The cypher is set on a blue background, which is a royal colour. The device is encircled with diamonds, which symbolise wise men, important authors, craftsmen, the sacred white elephant, graceful women, vigorous soldiers, and public servants.

The Royal Regalia that circumscribe the device: the Great Crown of Victory surmounts the throne, flanked by a sword and a yak's tail whisk; under the throne is a pair of royal slippers. These five objects are used in coronation ceremonies, which were last used during the king's coronation on 5 May 1950.

The bottom of the emblem features a pink ribbon with the name of the celebrations inscribed in gold. The two ends of the ribbon are held by the monkey god Hanuman, the devotee and leader of Rama's army in the Ramakien, and Garuda, the Hindu god Vishnu's vehicle. The green and gold colors in the background represent the fertility of the land.

== Main programmes ==
=== Royal ceremonies ===
The king endorsed the royal programmes during the periods of June 2006 as follows:

Date	Time	Ceremony	Place
Thursday, 8 June	17:00	The merit making royal ceremony in dedication to the royal ancestors	Amarin Winitchai Throne Hall
Friday, 9 June	09:00–17:00	The letting of the public paying of homage to the royal ancestors	Phra Thep Bidon Hall, Wat Phra Si Rattanasatsadaram
Friday, 9 June	10.00 hours	The homage paying royal ceremony in dedication to the royal ancestors. Thai:พระราชพิธีบวงสรวงสมเด็จพระบูรพมหากษัตริยาธิราชและเสด็จออกมหาสมาคม (Phra ratchaphithi buangsuang somdet phra burapha maha kasattriyathirat lae sadet ok maha samakhom). King Bhumibol Adulyadej and Queen Sirikit lit candles in front of the worship items, paid homages to the Buddha Images, presented the commemorative fans to the 10 high ecclesiastic monks, rested on the throne, vowed adherence to the Buddhist sermon.	Anantasamakhom Throne Hall
Friday, 9 June	10.00 hours	King Bhumibol Adulyadej and Queen Sirikit holding the grand audience. After that, His Majesty King Bhumibol Adulyadej gave the royal reply speech.	Balcony of Anantasamakhom Throne Hall
Saturday, 10 June	17:00	The 60th Year on Throne Anniversary Royal Celebrations: The establishment of ecclesiastical ranks; The religious ceremonies; The throne celebrating walking ceremony	Amarin Winitchai Throne Hall
Monday, 12 June	16:00	King Bhumibol Adulyadej and Queen Sirikit, as well as members of the royal household, welcoming the visiting monarchs (Thai: พิธีพระประมุขและผู้แทนพระองค์จากพระราชวงศ์ต่างประเทศถวายพระพรชัยมงคล, romanized: Phithi phra pramuk lae phu thaen phra ong chak phra ratchawong tang prathet thawai phra phon chaiyamongkhon)	Anantasamakhom Throne Hall
Monday, 12 June	18:30	The monarchs inspecting the Royal Projects Exhibition and the Royal Barge Procession ((Thai: พิธีทอดพระเนตรกระบวนเรือพระราชพิธี, romanized: Phithi thot phra net krabuan ruea phra ratchaphithi)	The Royal Thai Navy's Auditorium, and Ratchanawikasapha (Royal Thai Navy Hall)
Monday, 12 June	19:30	The Opening Ceremony of the Exposition of Royal Honorification on Development (Thai: พิธีเปิดนิทรรศการเฉลิมพระเกียรติด้านการพัฒนา, romanized: Phithi poet nithatsakan chaloem phra kiat dan kan phatthana)	Royal Thai Navy Conference Hall
Tuesday, 13 June	19:30	Royal Banquet	Borommaratchasathit Maholan Hall, Grand Palace

The royal ceremonies were broadcast in their entirety nationwide by the Television Pool of Thailand through every general television channel at the dates and times listed.

=== State ceremonies ===
- Lighting of Well-Wishing Candles Ceremony, Friday, 9 June 2006, 19:19, Sanam Luang.
- Feasting Assemblage arranged by the Government to offer the dinner to the monarchs, the Government House.
- Trooping the Colour, Thanon Ratchadamnoen.

== Commemorations ==
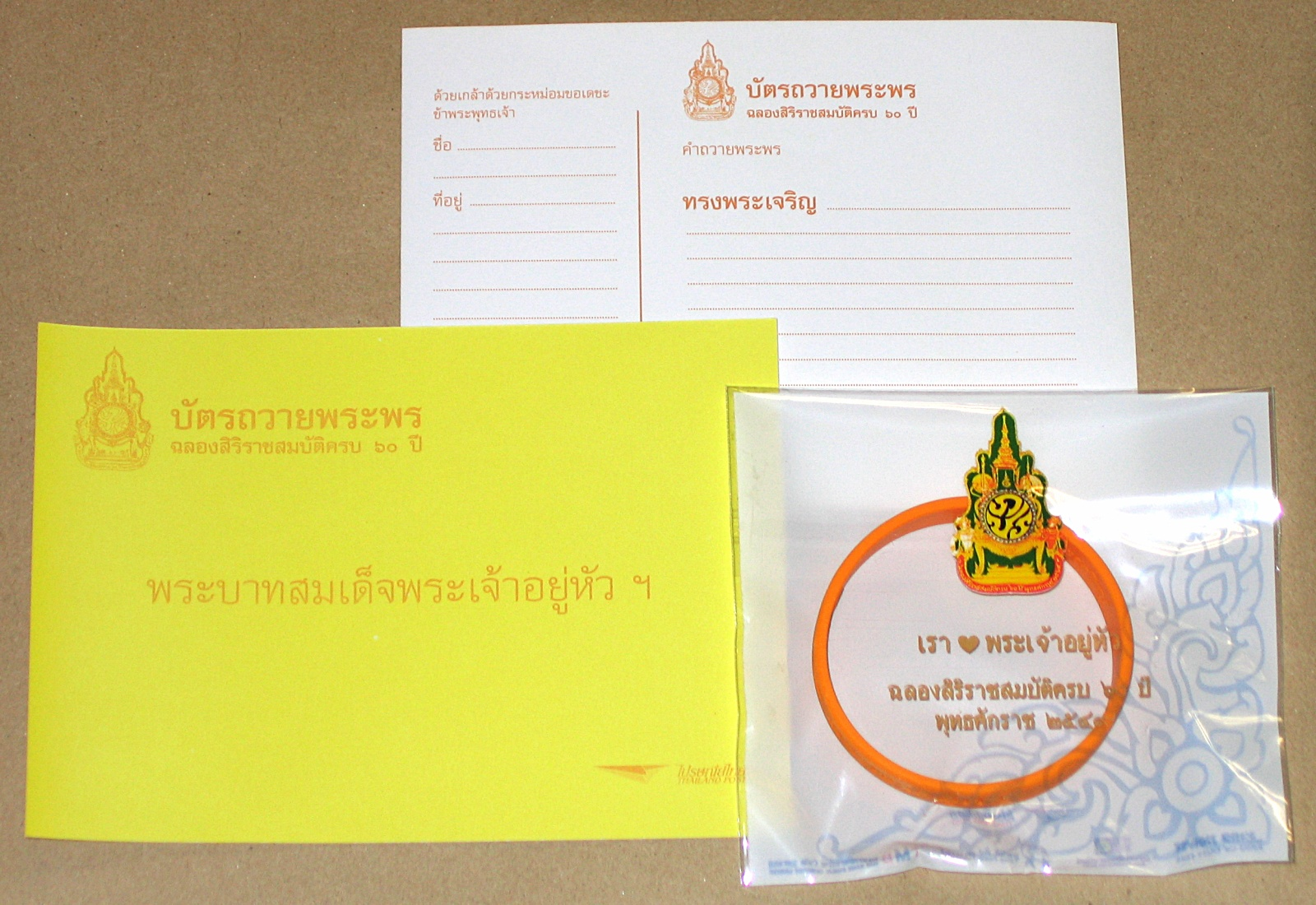
King 60th Anniversary wristband

Thais wore royal yellow tee shirts to celebrate (although in some organisations it became mandatory), and as the main celebration period of 9–13 June approached, shirts bearing the celebrations' special emblem rapidly sold out. The Ministry of Commerce ordered another 500,000 shirts to meet demand, and many people still wore yellow shirts weeks after the celebrations ended.

Also popular were orange rubber wristbands, similar to the Livestrong wristbands, inscribed "We love the King."

Photographs of the ceremonies are also popular. The Bureau of the Royal Household set up a photo lab specifically to fill orders for official images, and on Bangkok's streets there are vendors selling copies of the photos of the king and visiting royals. Also, newspapers such as the Bangkok Post and The Nation reported brisk sales of commemorative publications.

On 16 January 2007, the government officially declared the end of the 60th anniversary celebrations and commenced year-long celebrations of Bhumibol's 80th birthday.

== Guests ==
Members of 25 reigning Royal Houses accepted the invitation of King Bhumibol Adulyadej (Rama IX) and attended the ceremonies commemorating the 60th anniversary of the Thai Monarch's reign. Twelve monarchies from Europe, Asia, Africa, and the Middle East were represented by their respective Sovereigns, while thirteen of them sent representatives. Notable absences included members of the Royal Houses of Saudi Arabia, due to the declining health of King Abdullah, and Nepal, which was experiencing ongoing political instability that culminated in the abolition of the monarchy in the country in 2008. Below is the complete list of all members of foreign Royal Houses who attended the celebrations in Bangkok:

=== Foreign Royalty ===
- The Prime Minister of Bahrain (representing the King of Bahrain)
- (Belgium) The Duke and Duchess of Brabant (representing the King of the Belgians)
- The Crown Prince of Bhutan (representing the King of Bhutan)
- The Sultan and Queen of Brunei
- The King of Cambodia
- The Prince Consort of Denmark (representing the Queen of Denmark)
- The Emperor and Empress of Japan
- The King of Jordan
  - (Jordan) The Prince Hashim bin Hussein
- The Emir of Kuwait
- The King and Queen of Lesotho
- The Hereditary Prince of Liechtenstein (representing Prince Sovereign of Liechtenstein)
- The Grand Duke of Luxembourg
- The Yang di-Pertuan Agong and Raja Permaisuri Agong of Malaysia
- The Prince Sovereign of Monaco
- The Princess Consort of Morocco (representing the King of Morocco)
- The Prince and Princess of Orange (representing the Queen of the Netherlands)
- The Crown Prince and Crown Princess of Norway (representing the King of Norway)
- The Sayyid Shihab bin Tariq bin Taimur Al Said (representing the Sultan of Oman)
- The Emir and Sheikha Moza bint Nasser al-Missned of Qatar
- The Queen of Spain (representing the King of Spain)
- (Eswatini) The King and Queen of Swaziland
- The King and Queen of Sweden
- The Crown Prince of Tonga (representing the King of Tonga)
- The Crown Prince of Abu Dhabi (representing the Emir of Abu Dhabi and President of the United Arab Emirates)
- The Duke of York (representing the Queen of the United Kingdom)

== See also ==
- Bhumibol Adulyadej
- Diamond Jubilee of Elizabeth II
- Diamond Jubilee
- List of longest-reigning monarchs
