= Chatra (umbrella) =

Auspicious object in Indian religions

Translations of Chatra
- English: ceremonial umbrella or parasol
- Sanskrit: छत्र/छत्त्र, छत्ररत्न (IAST: chatra/chattra, chatraratna)
- Pali: chatta
- Burmese: ထီး
- Chinese: 伞/傘, 伞盖/傘蓋 (Pinyin: sǎn, sǎngài)
- Japanese: 傘, 傘蓋 (Rōmaji: san/kasa, sangai)
- Khmer: ឆ័ត្រ
- Korean: 산(傘), 산개(傘蓋) (RR: san, sangae)
- Tibetan: རིནཆེན་གདུགས, གདུགས་ནི། (rin chen gdugs, gdugs ni)
- Thai: ฉัตร (RTGS: chat)

Chatra

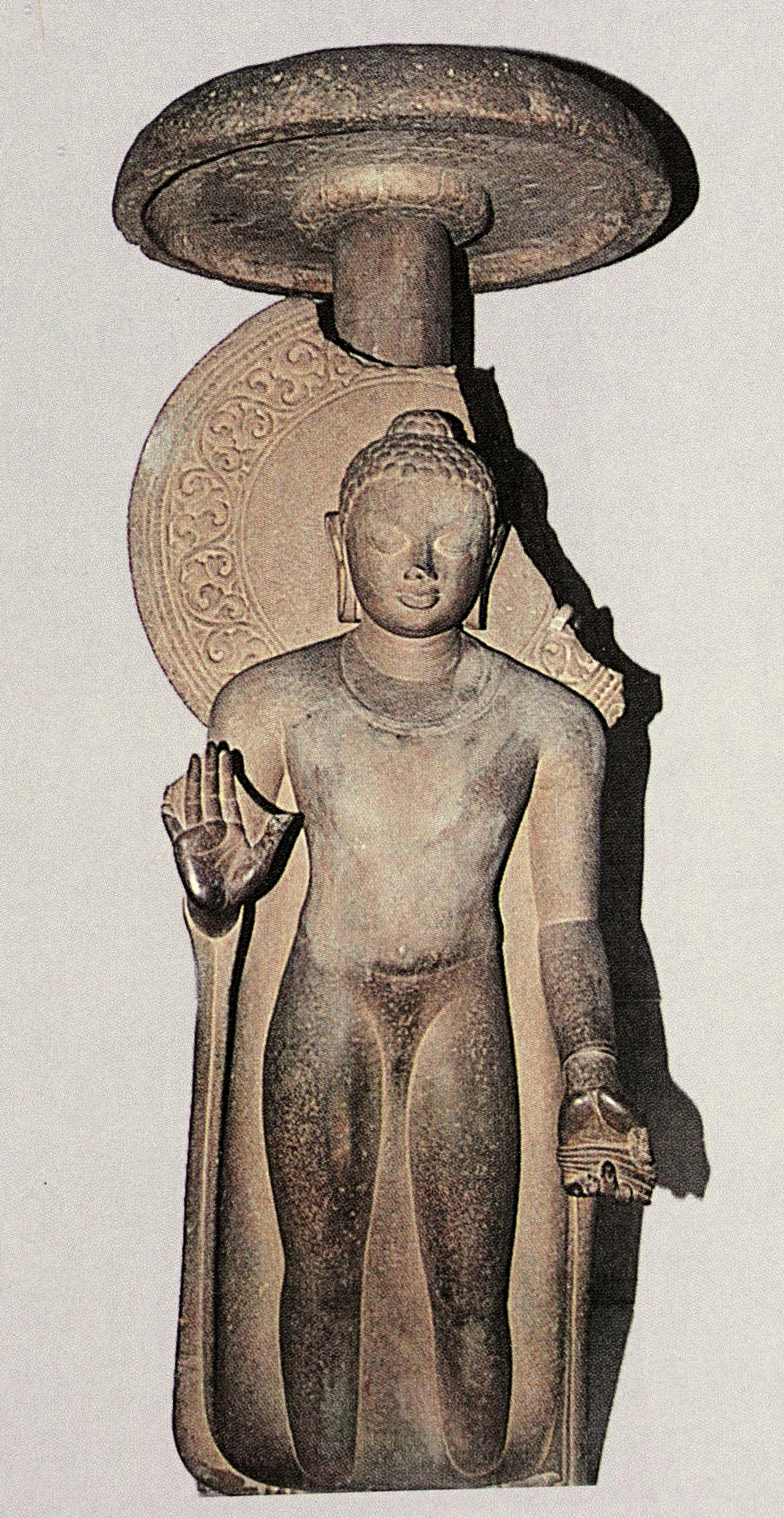
The Buddha under a chatra inscribed "Gift of Abhayamira in 154 GE" (474 CE), Gupta art from the reign of Kumaragupta II, now held by the Sarnath Museum.

The chatra or chhatra, also known under various translations including the ceremonial, state, royal, or holy umbrella or parasol, is a symbol of royal and imperial power and sanctity in Indian art and a symbol of holiness in Hinduism, Jainism, and Buddhism. There are also various specific forms, including 3-, 7-, 8-, and 9-tiered chatra and the bejewelled chatraratna.

== India and Tibet ==
In India, the chatra was an ancient symbol of kingship and emperorship, representing both kingly power and righteousness. In particular, it is employed in depictions of chakravartis, the supposed holy emperors over the entire earth. It is also reckoned as one of the ashtamangala, the eight holy symbols of enlightened sages and buddhas, in Digambar Jainism, Vajrayana Buddhism, and other Dharmic faiths.

In Hindu mythology, Chatra can itself be recognized as a deity, yidam, and ishta-devata. More often, it is an emblem of various gods including Varuna, Ganesha (particularly during Ganesh Chaturthi), Revanta, Surya, Vishnu in his Vamana avatar, and Vishvakarman.

In the chakra systems of Dharmic faiths and traditional Indian and Tibetan medicine, the chatra is used as a symbol of the sahasrara, the crown chakra.

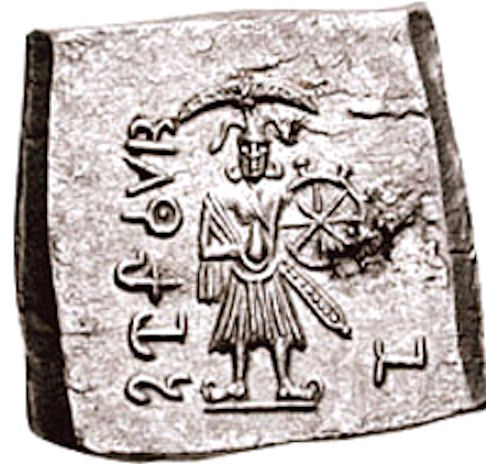
A chatra crowning Vāsudeva-Krishna on a coin of Agathocles of Bactria, c. 180 BCE

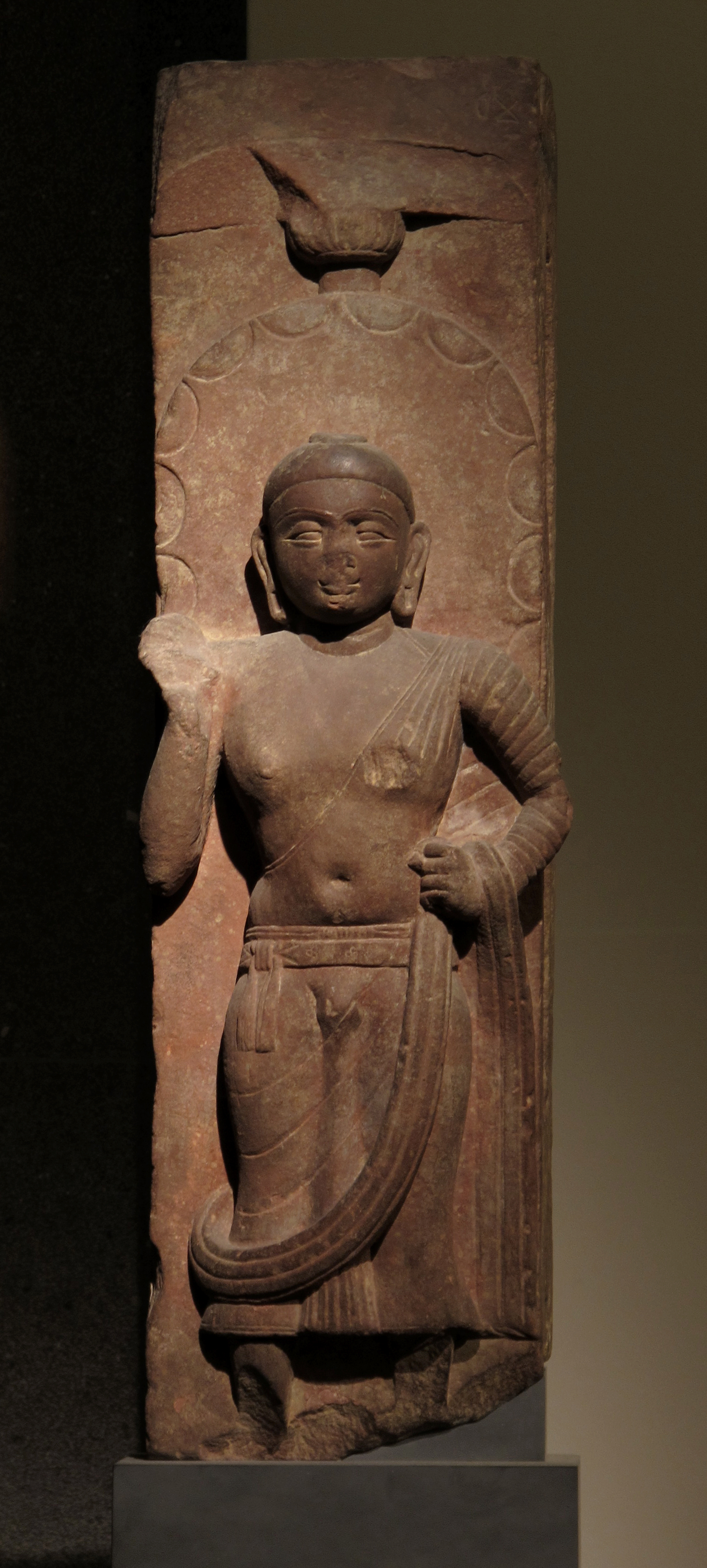
Mathura statue of a bodhisattva crowned by a chatra

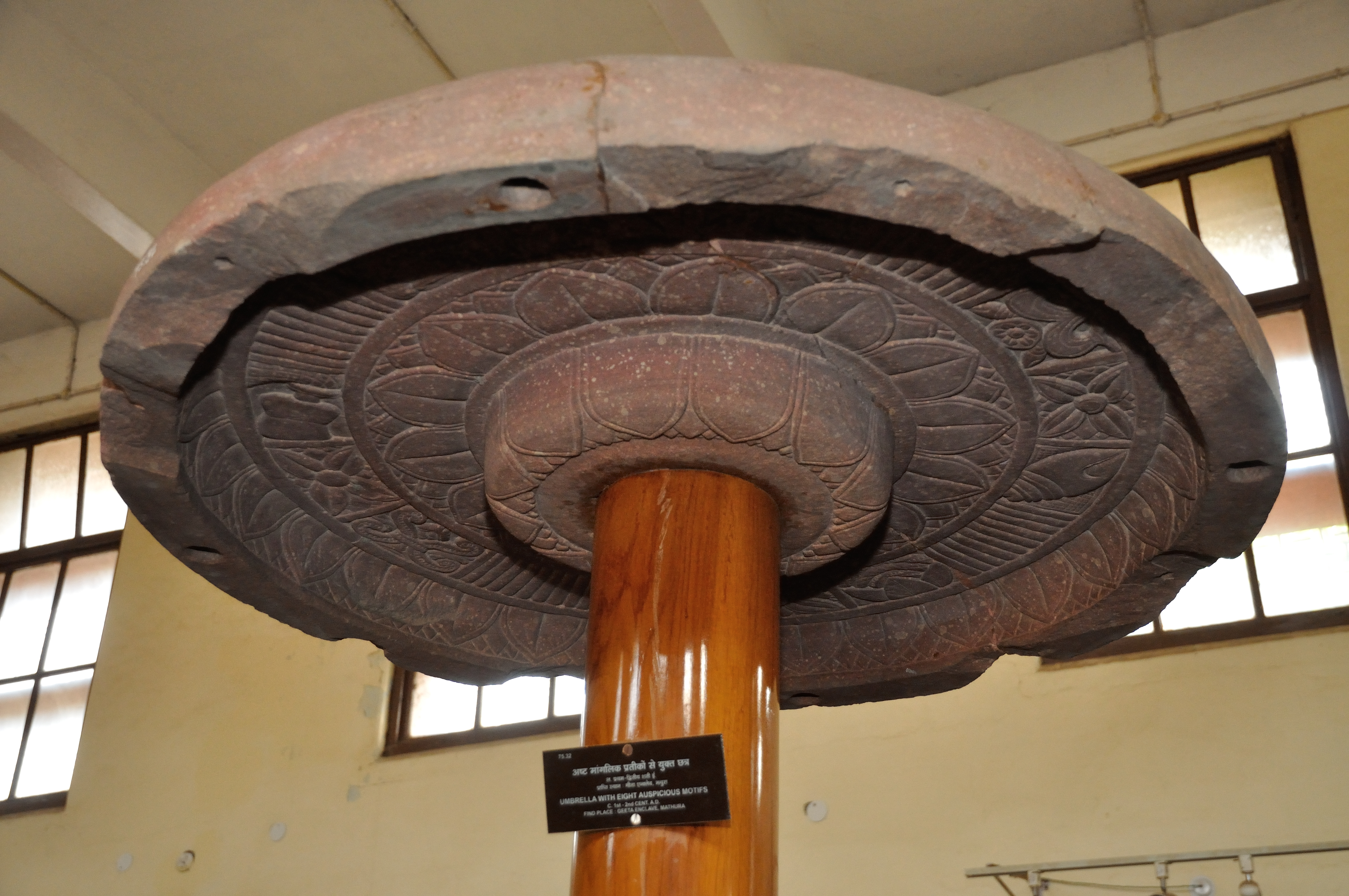
Mathura chatra, c. 1st or 2nd century CE

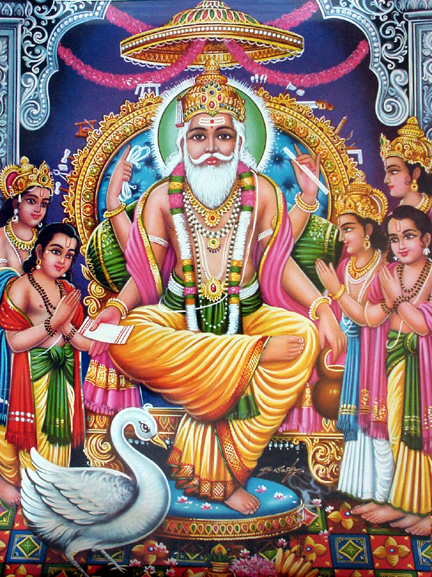
Vishvakarman with chatra

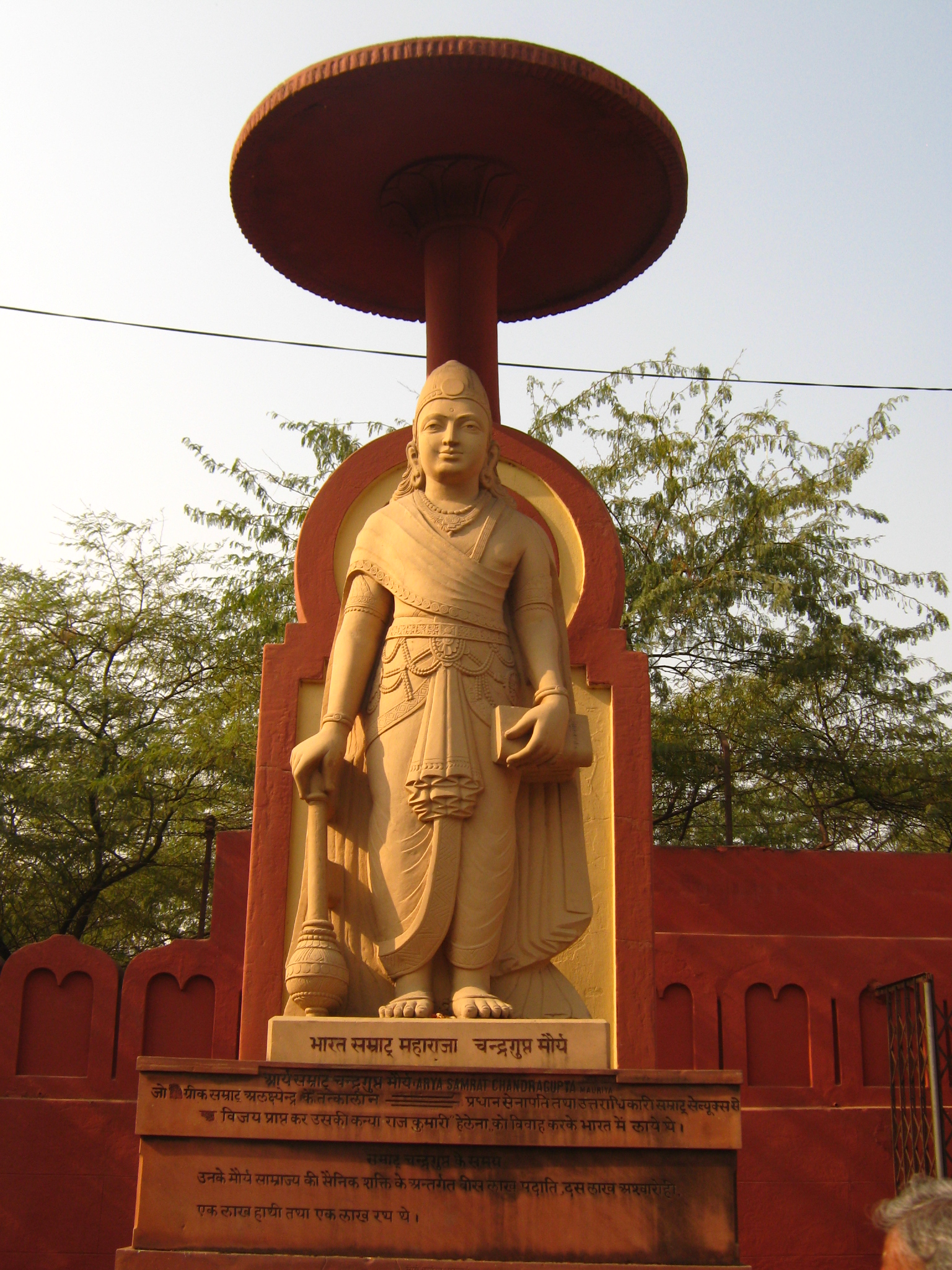
Chandragupta Maurya with chatra

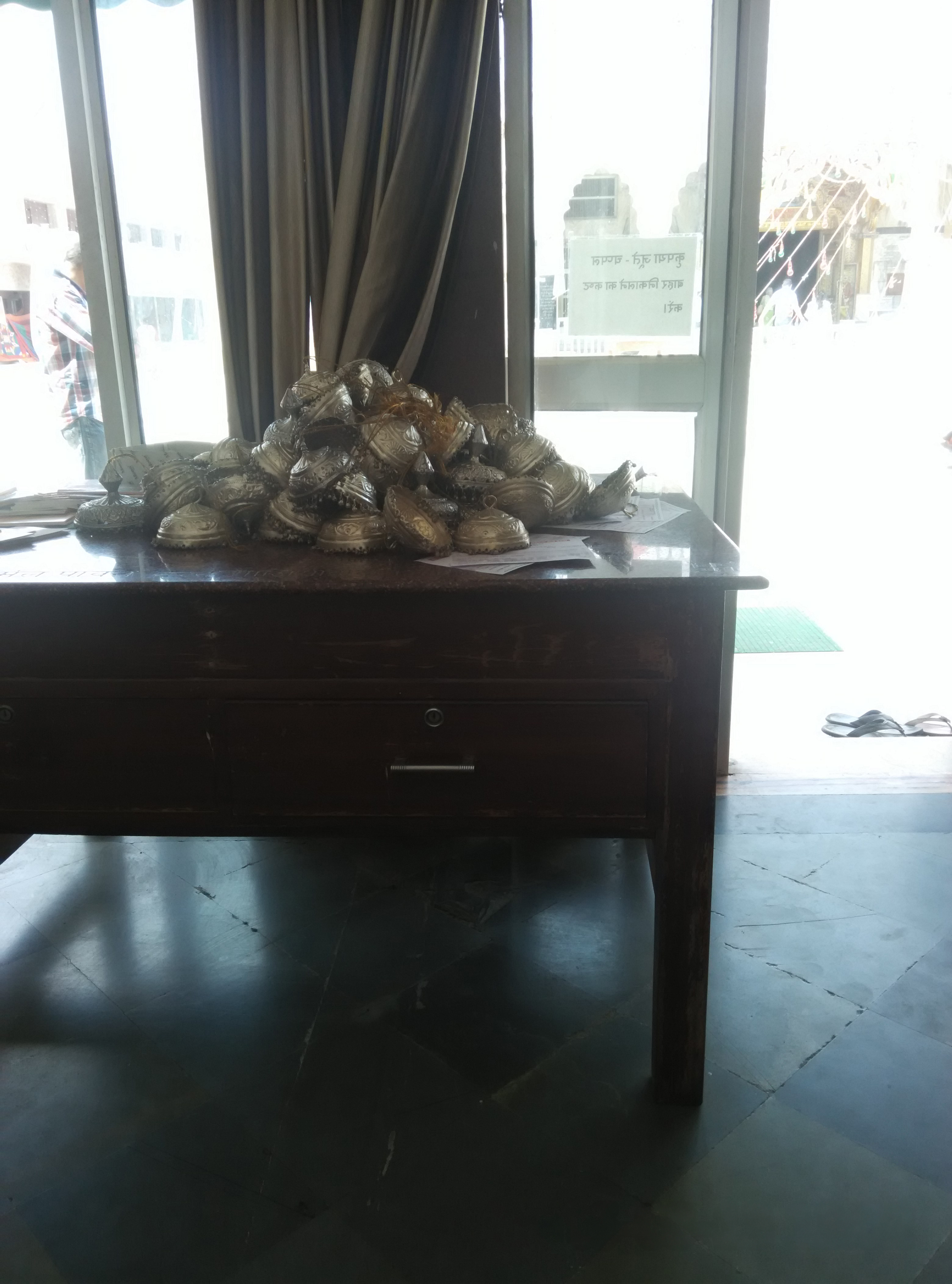
The chatra of the Tijara Jain temple in Rajasthan

A chatra diagram

== Myanmar ==
In Burmese culture, the chatra is known as the hti. It is used as regalia and employed at the crowns of Burmese pagodas.

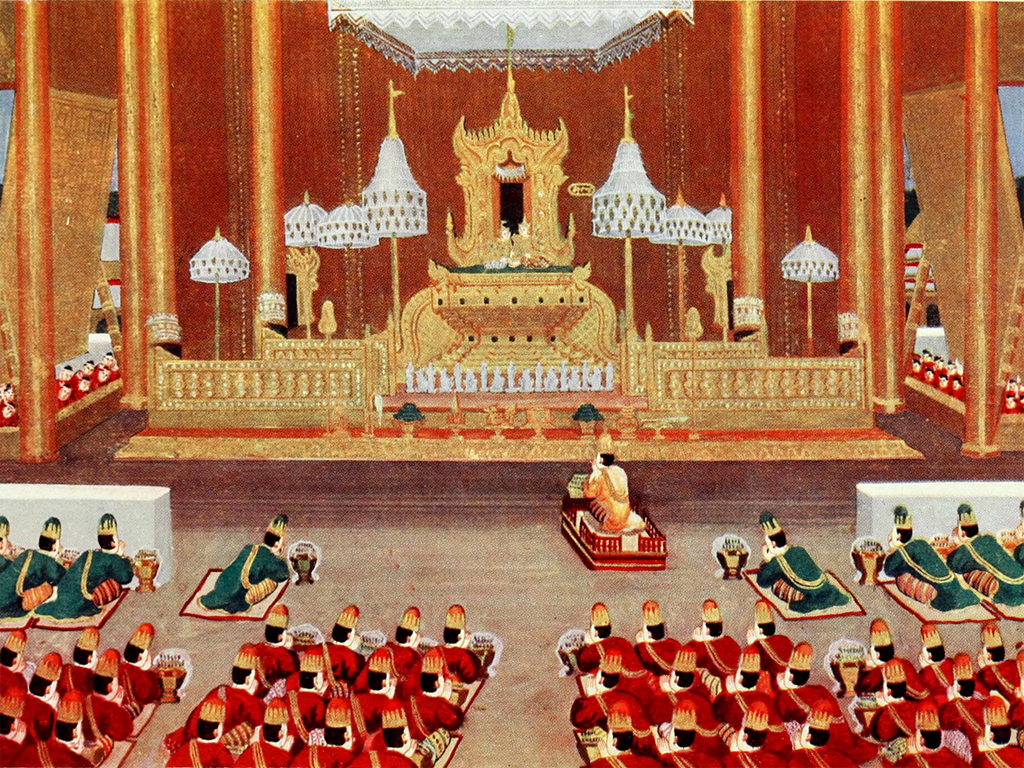
Htis flanking the throne in Saya Chone's 1907 "Royal Audience"

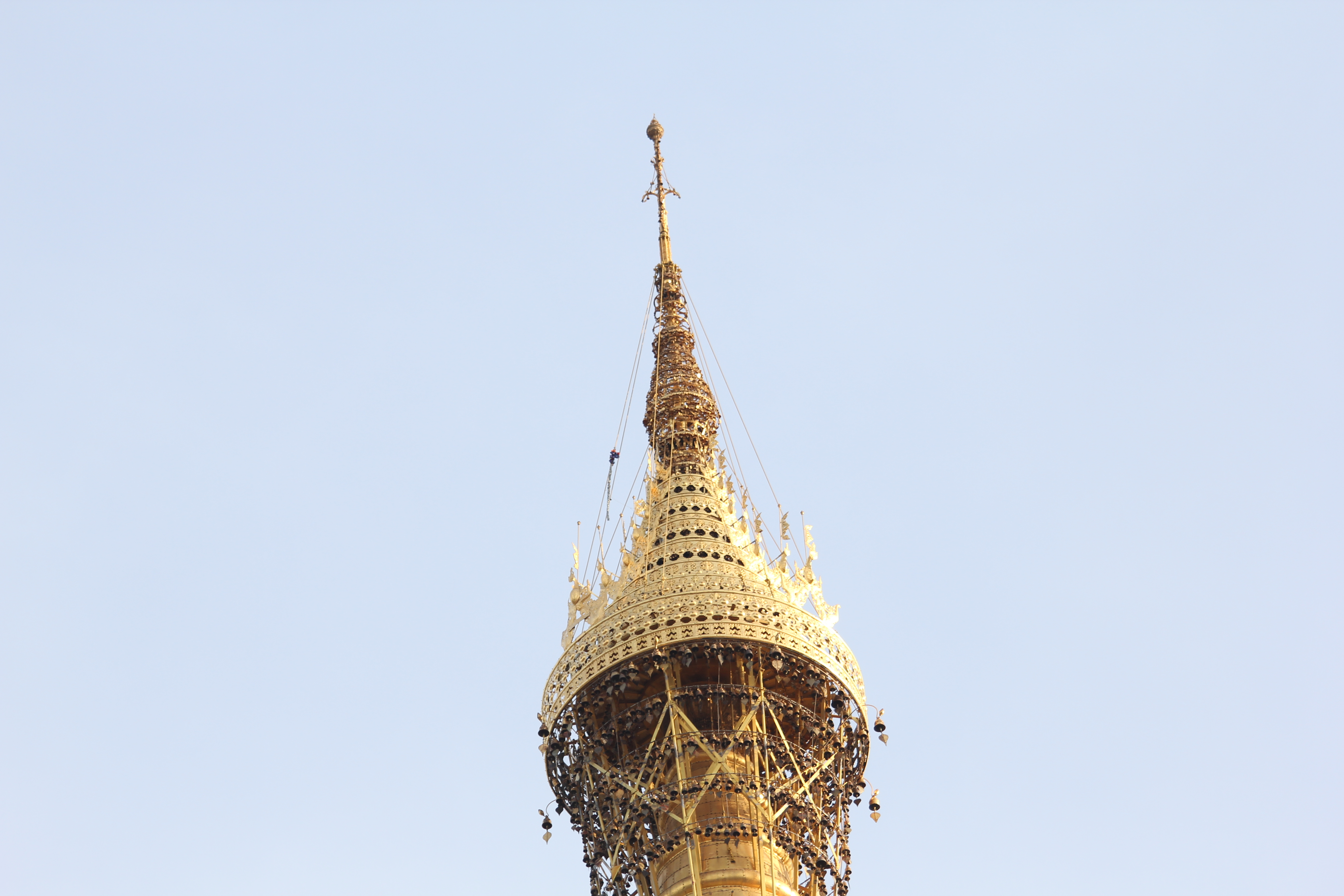
Shwedagon Pagoda's hti

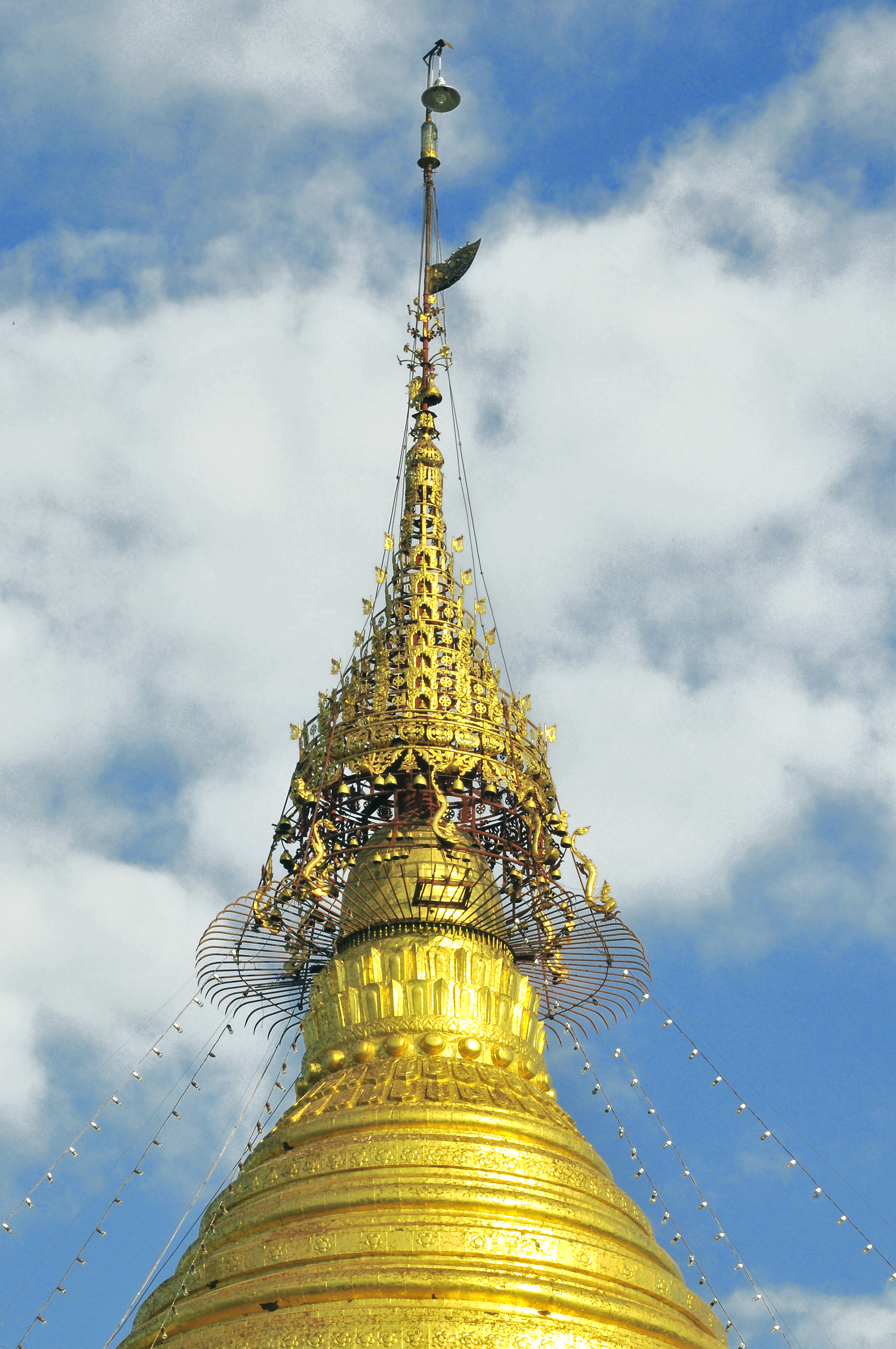
Kuthodaw Pagoda's hti

== Thailand ==
In Thai culture, the chatra developed into the white Royal Nine-Tiered Umbrella, part of the country's regalia. Properly, only a crowned king may use the 9-tiered umbrella, uncrowned kings and other members of the royal family being restricted to a 7-tier form. The 9-tiered chatra is used as the logo of Royal Umbrella rice.

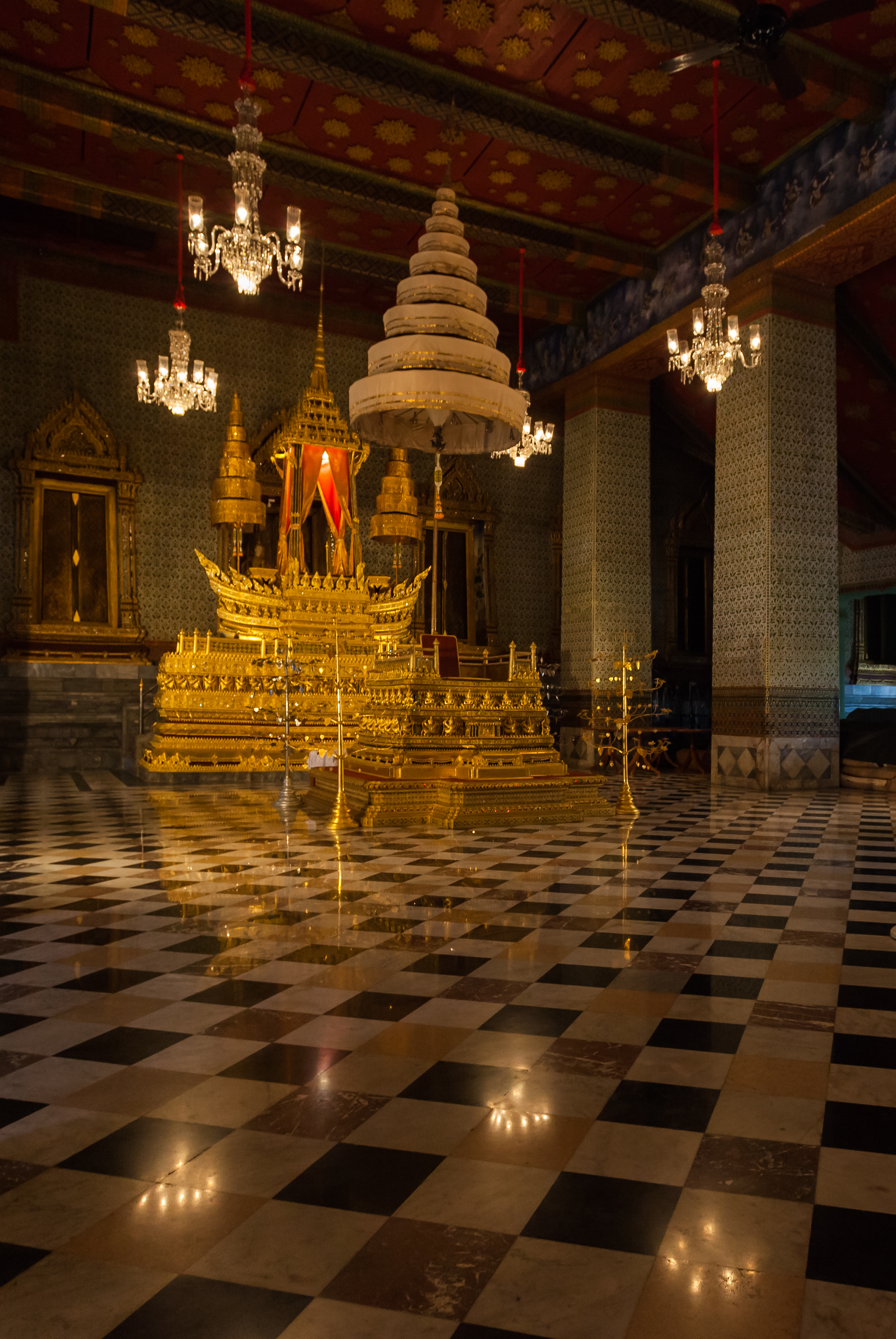
Thailand's Royal Nine-Tiered Umbrella attached to a throne inside a hall in the Grand Palace, Bangkok

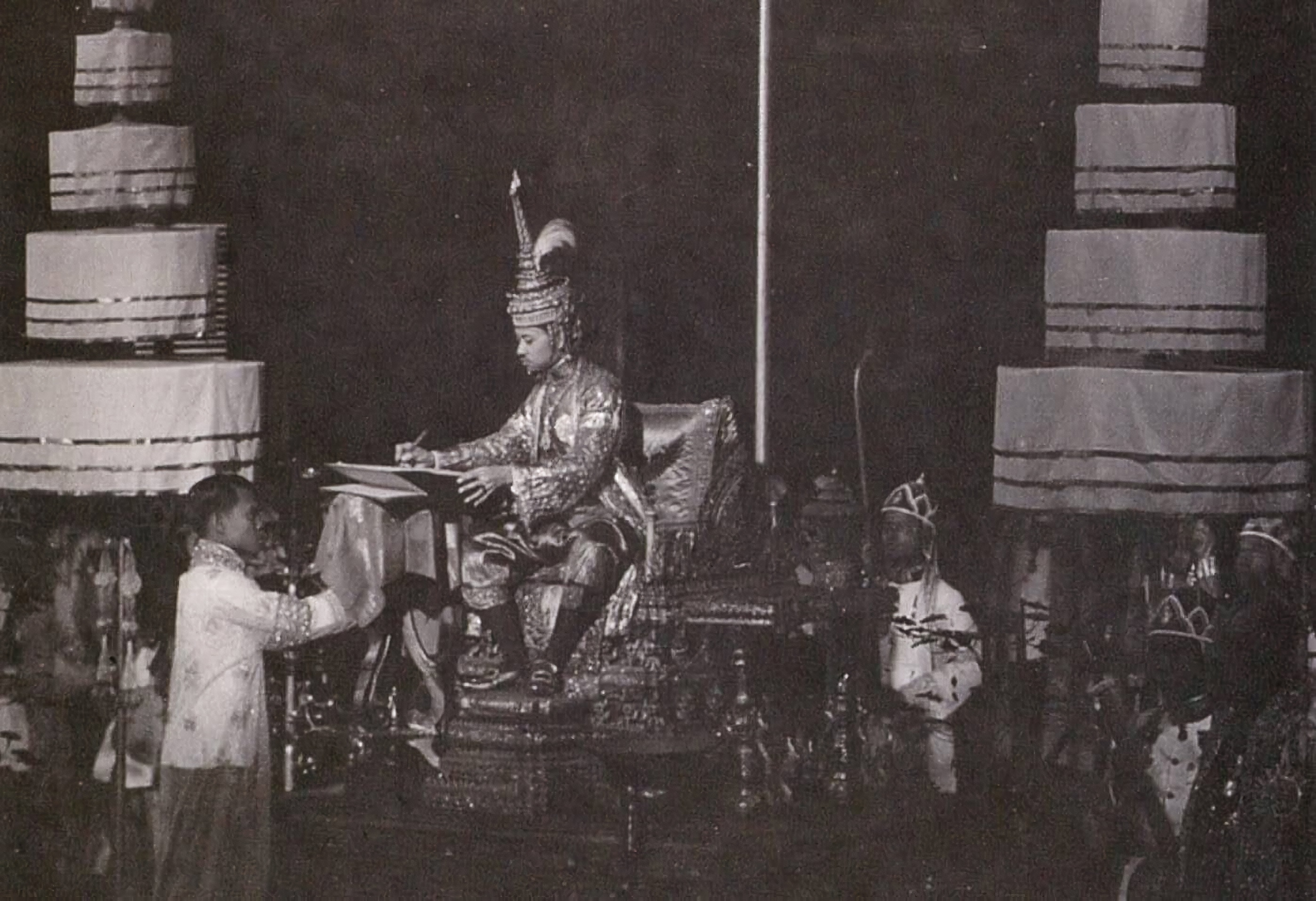
A 9-tiered umbrella beside the throne as King Prajadhipok signs a constitution in Ananta Samakhom Hall

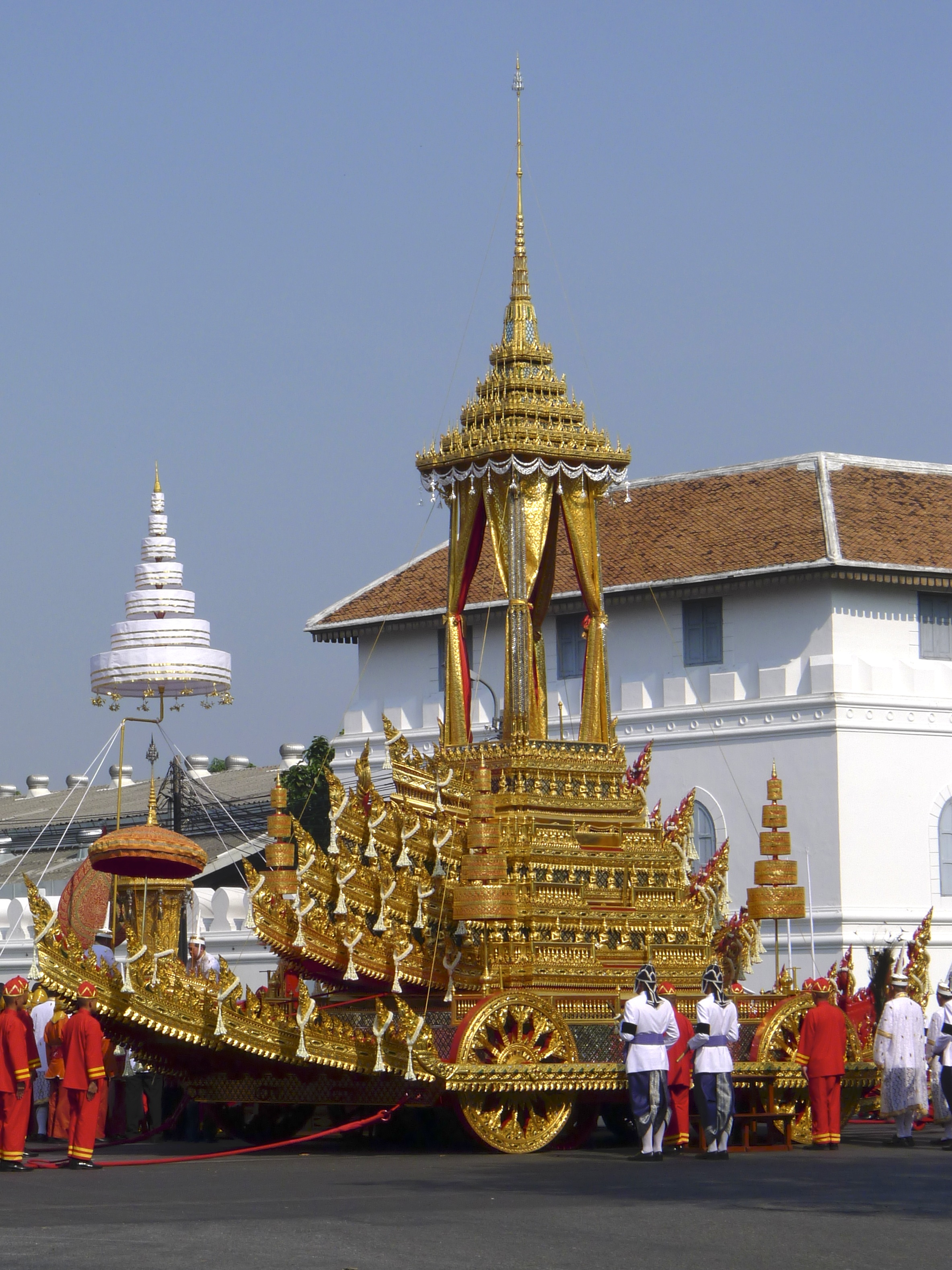
A 7-tiered umbrella over the urn of Princess Bejaratana Rajasuda as it is moved to the Great Chariot of Victory

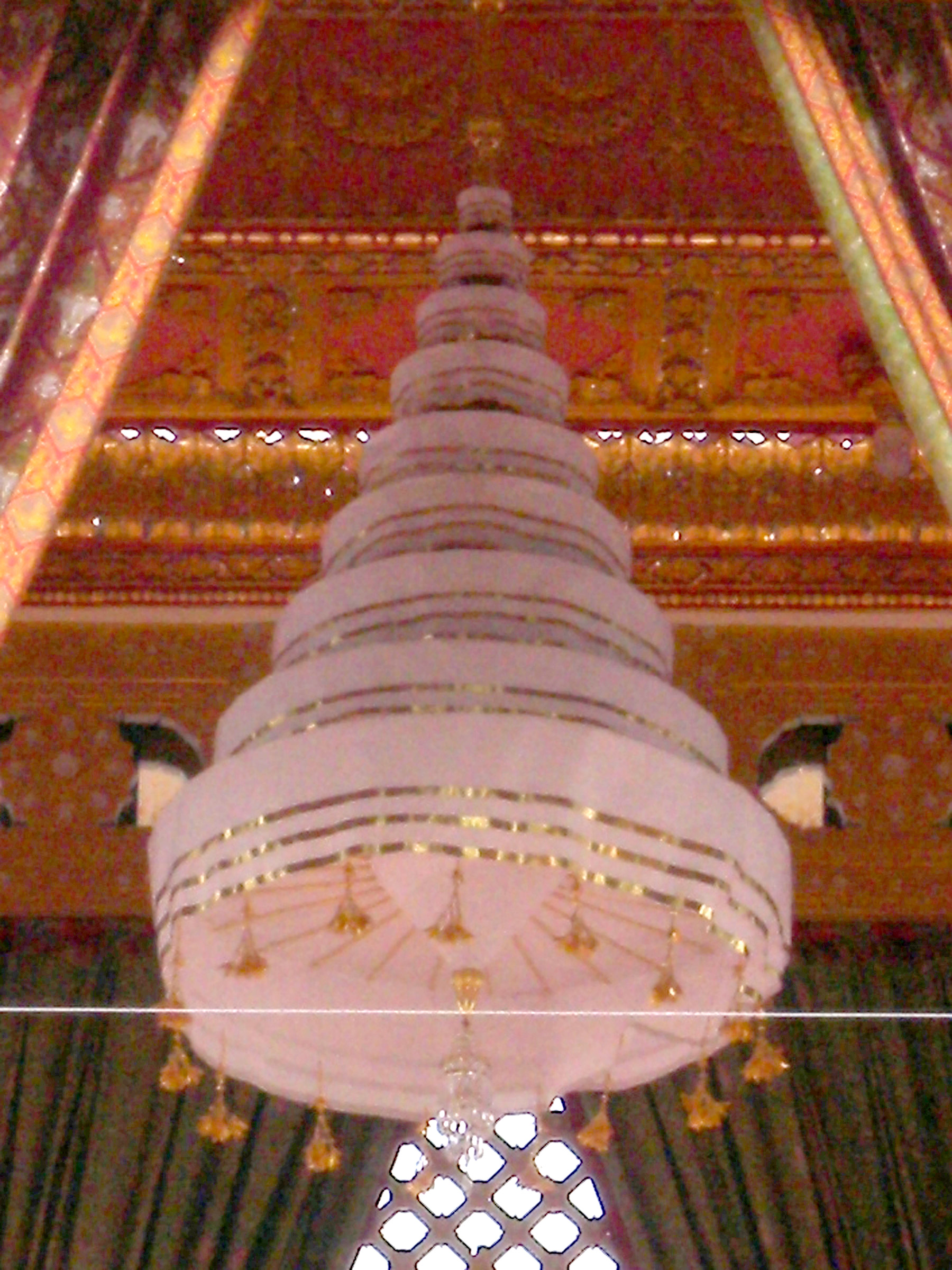
A 9-tiered umbrella over the funeral pyre of King Bhumibol Adulyadej

== See also ==
- Baldachin, a similar concept in European iconography
- Chhatrapati
