= Regalia of Thailand =

Coronation symbols of Thailand

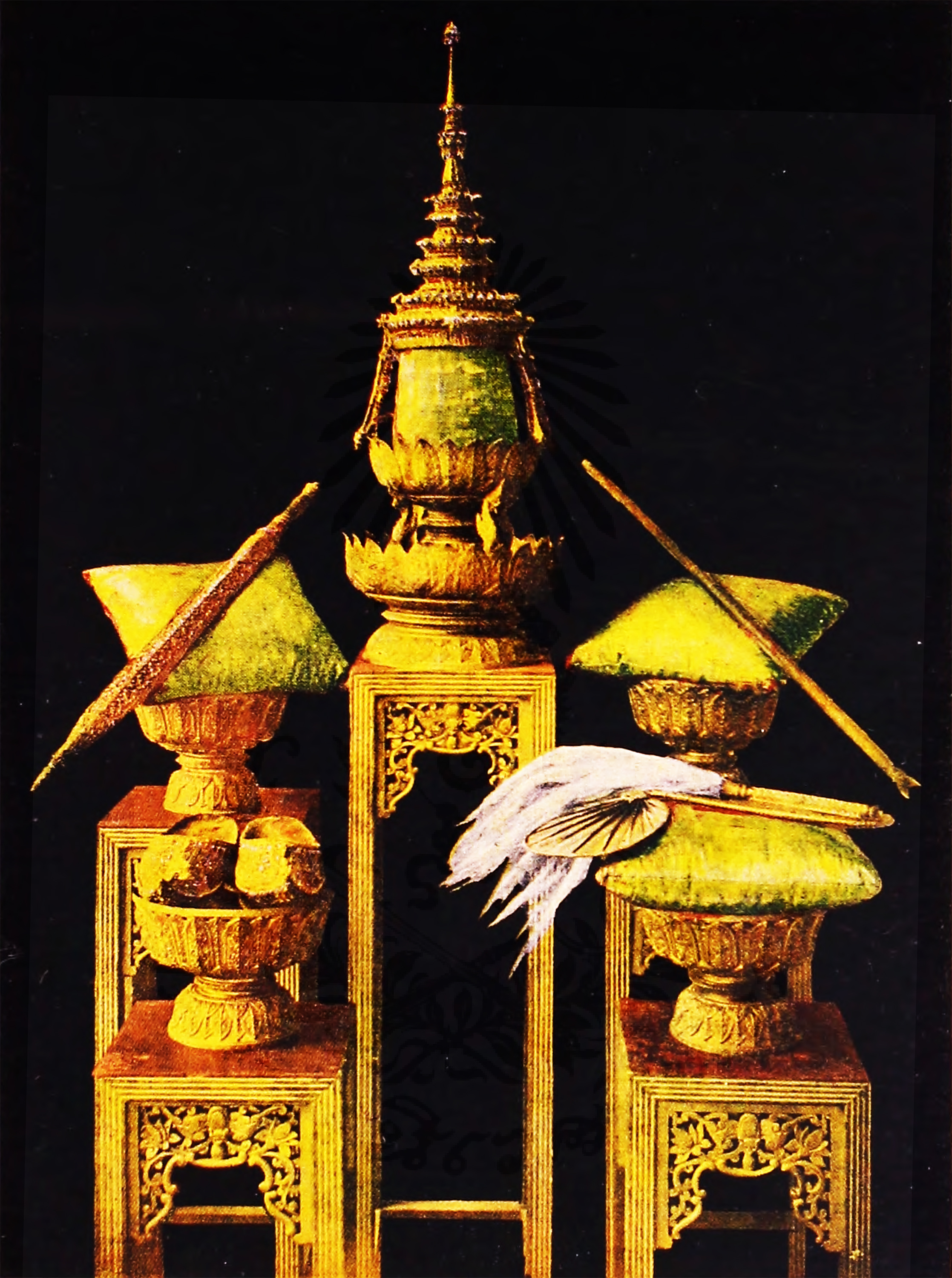
The Five Royal Regalia consist of a crown, a sword, a staff, a pair of slippers, and a royal fan and fly whisk.

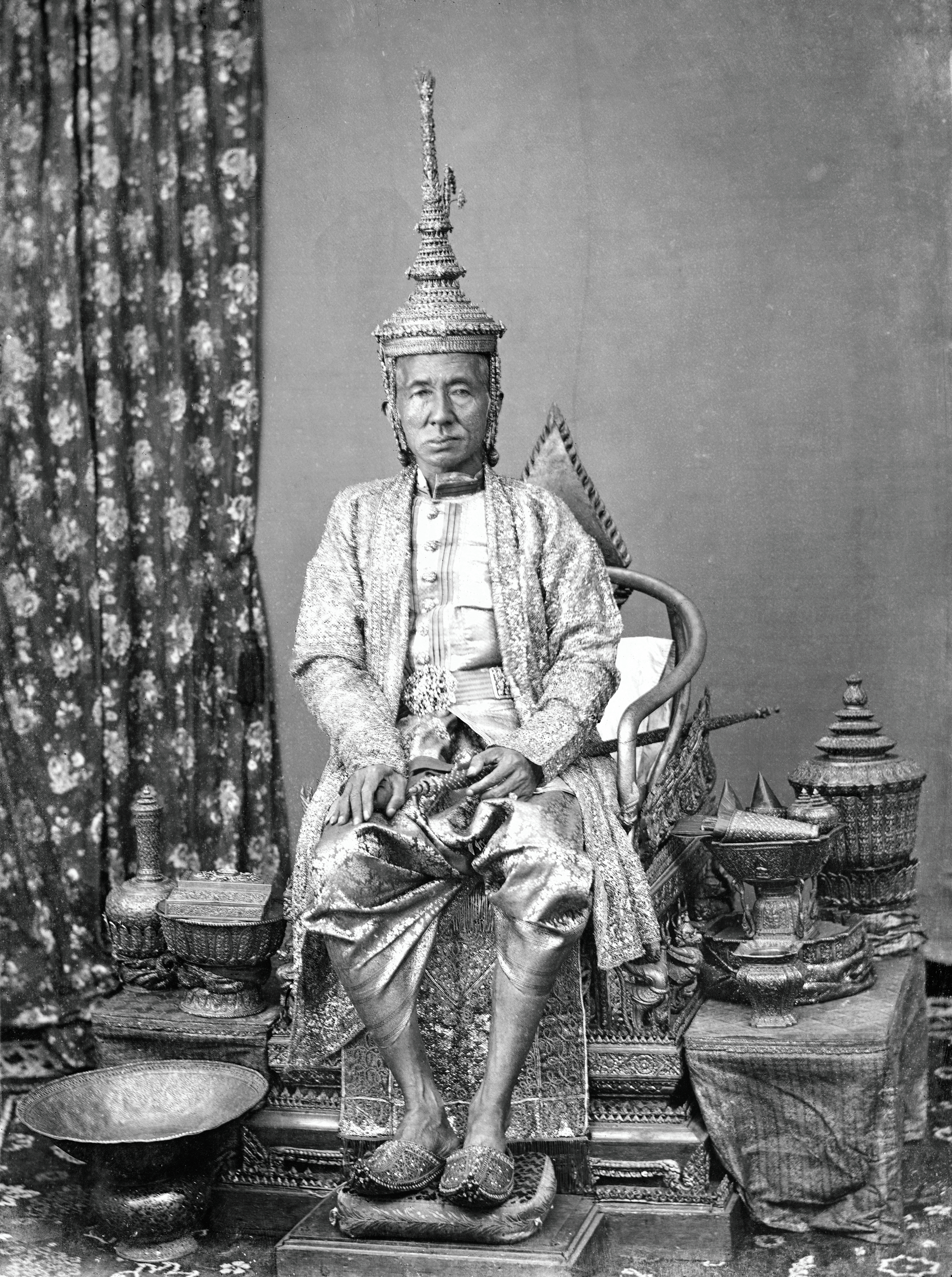
King Mongkut (Rama IV) of Siam, in full state regalia. Photo by John Thomson, c. 1865.

Royal Regalia of Thailand (Thai: เครื่องราชกกุธภัณฑ์, RTGS: Khrueang Racha Kakutthaphan) are the coronation regalia of the kings of Thailand. They serve as expressions of royal power, dignity, and sovereignty. The regalia are presently housed in the Pavilion of Regalia, Royal Decorations and Coins within the Grand Palace in Bangkok.

== Coronation ceremony ==
The royal regalia consists of 28 individual pieces, which are traditionally presented to the king during his coronation ceremony. They are brought before the king in a ceremonial procession by squires and chamberlains. While the court Brahmins recite sacred mantras, the king, seated on the Bhadrapitha Throne, is first presented with the Great Crown of Victory, which he places on his own head. The remaining regalia are presented to him in turn; he receives and inspects each item before it is placed on a table beside the throne.

== The royal insignia ==
=== Five Royal Regalia ===
The royal insignia of Thailand consist of a number of traditional objects symbolising the authority and sovereignty of the monarch. The most important of these are collectively known as the Khrueang Bencharat Kakuthaphan ("Five Royal Regalia"):

- The Great Crown of Victory (Phra Maha Phichai Mongkut) is perhaps the most unusual piece to a Western observer, as it does not correspond to the European concept of a crown. The crown has a conical shape rather than a gem-studded diadem. It was made of gold in 1782 during the reign of King Phra Phutthayotfa Chulalok and enameled in red and green. It stands about 66 cm high and weighs 7.3 kg. The crown is topped with a large diamond known as the Maha Wichien Mani, which was added by King Mongkut (Rama IV).
- The Sword of Victory (Phra Saeng Khan Chai Si) was presented to King Phra Phutthayotfa by Chao Phraya Apai Pubek of Cambodia in 1783. Chao Phraya Apai Pubek is said to have discovered it in Tonlé Sap Lake. The hilt of the sword measures 25 cm, the blade 64.5 cm; when sheathed, it is 101 cm long and weighs 1.9 kg.
- The Royal Staff (Than Phra Khon) is made from the wood of the Cassia fistula tree. It measures 118 cm in length, with a knob at the top and three pointed ends at the bottom. According to tradition, "it is intended to guide the king's steps on the path of justice and equality."
- The Royal Fan (Phat Wan Wichani) symbolise the King’s ability to dispel misfortune from his subjects and to keep them in comfort and well-being.
- The Royal Sandals (Chalong Phrabat Choeng Ngon) are made of gold and have slightly upturned toes to protect the king's feet. They are set with diamonds and lined with red velvet. In ancient Siam, shoes were not worn and were considered appropriate only for royalty. However, sandals (Paduka) were worn by Rama, the hero of the Ramayana, and they are also mentioned in Jataka No. 406. In both instances, the sandals represent the presence of royalty in absence.

=== Other royal regalia and utensils ===
Beyond the Five Royal Regalia, the king also possesses several other royal insignia and utensils collectively known as the Khrueang Ratchupapok (Royal Utensils). These items, though not part of the principal regalia, are equally revered as emblems of kingship and divine authority. They reflect distinct Siamese royal customs that evolved through the Ayutthaya and Rattanakosin periods. Together, they symbolize the full spectrum of royal virtues and the sacred duties of the monarch:

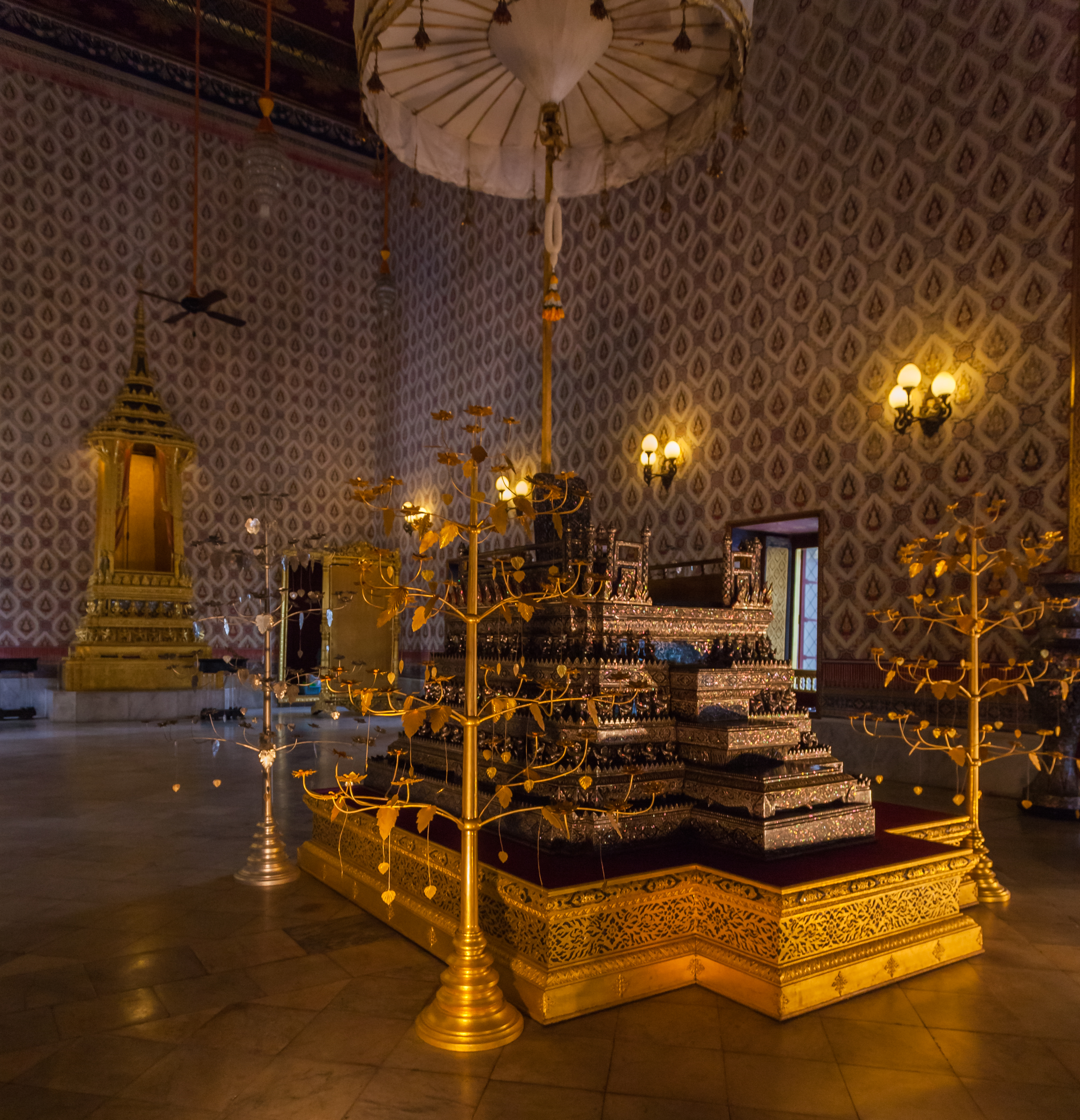
Dusit Maha Prasat Throne Hall: Umbrella over the Mother-of-Pearl Throne in the Dusit Maha Prasat Hall

- The Royal Nine-Tiered Umbrella (Nopphapadon Mahasawettachat) is probably the oldest symbol of royal authority in Asia. It consists of several individual umbrellas arranged one above the other: five for the Uparat, seven for the king before his coronation, and nine for the king once he has attained full sovereignty. George Groslier suggests that the historical origin of Siamese umbrellas lies in seventh-century Angkor. Royal umbrellas of this type are also mentioned in the Jataka as well as in the Mahāvaṃsa.
- The Golden Jubilee Diamond (Phet Kanchanaphisek), a 545.65 carat golden-brown diamond regarded as the largest faceted diamond in the world. It was presented to Bhumibol Adulyadej (Rama IX) in 1997 to commemorate the fiftieth anniversary of his accession to the throne.
- The Fly whisk made from the tail hair of a white elephant (Phra Sae Hang Chang Pueak)—both whisks are very ancient symbols. They are already mentioned in the Puranas as royal props. The materials from which they are made appear to have been chosen for auspicious reasons.
- The Royal Scepter is probably symbolically equivalent to the Royal Staff. Although the scepter is an important insignia of European kings, no reference to it can be found in ancient Indian literature. H.G. Wells suggests that it corresponds to the thunderbolt (vajra) of the Hindu god Indra.
- The Personal Sword was carried behind the Siamese kings on almost every occasion by the secretary of the royal household. It bears a resemblance to the sword seen by Zhou Daguan, the Chinese diplomat, when he visited the court at Angkor in 1296,
- The Brahmin Belt is a traditional attribute of the Hindu god Shiva. Its presentation to the king is intended to symbolize the unity of the god with the king.
- The Belt of the Nine Gems was formerly used as an amulet. The "Nine Gems" (diamond, ruby, emerald, yellow sapphire, garnet, black opal, moonstone, zircon, and chrysoberyl) represent nine planets; the auspicious stones "are said to endow the king with illustrious power and benevolence."
- The Eight Weapons of Independence appear to be of Siamese historical interest alone, and all likely refer to a specific historical moment – particularly in connection with King Naresuan, who is said to have killed the Crown Prince of Burma with the "Long-Hilted Sword" in 1593. The bow is certainly the weapon with the oldest history, while the discus and trident are attributes of the Hindu gods Vishnu and Shiva, and are said to symbolize the king's connection with these two gods. It was also Naresuan who is said to have killed the Burmese commander-in-chief Surakamma of a raiding army with a single shot across the border river of the same name using the matchlock "Gun of Satong." These eight weapons, however, are said to have been reproductions made for the coronation of King Vajiravudh (Rama VI); the real weapons were probably lost when Ayutthaya fell in 1767.
  - The Sword of the Hostages
  - The Discus
  - The Trident
  - The Diamond Spear
  - The Sword with a Long Handle
  - Sword and Shield
  - The Bow
  - The Gun of Satong

== Impressions ==
To commemorate the 60th Anniversary Celebrations of Bhumibol Adulyadej's Accession to the throne in 2006, Ratchadamnoen Boulevard in Bangkok's Phra Nakhon district was festively decorated. Various archways (exhibits), some of which spanned the entire width of the roadway, were set up on the green strip in the center. While the archways had historical, religious, or mythological themes ("The Naga," "Maha Chakri," "The Nine Gems," etc.), the exhibits depicted the Five Royal Insignia:

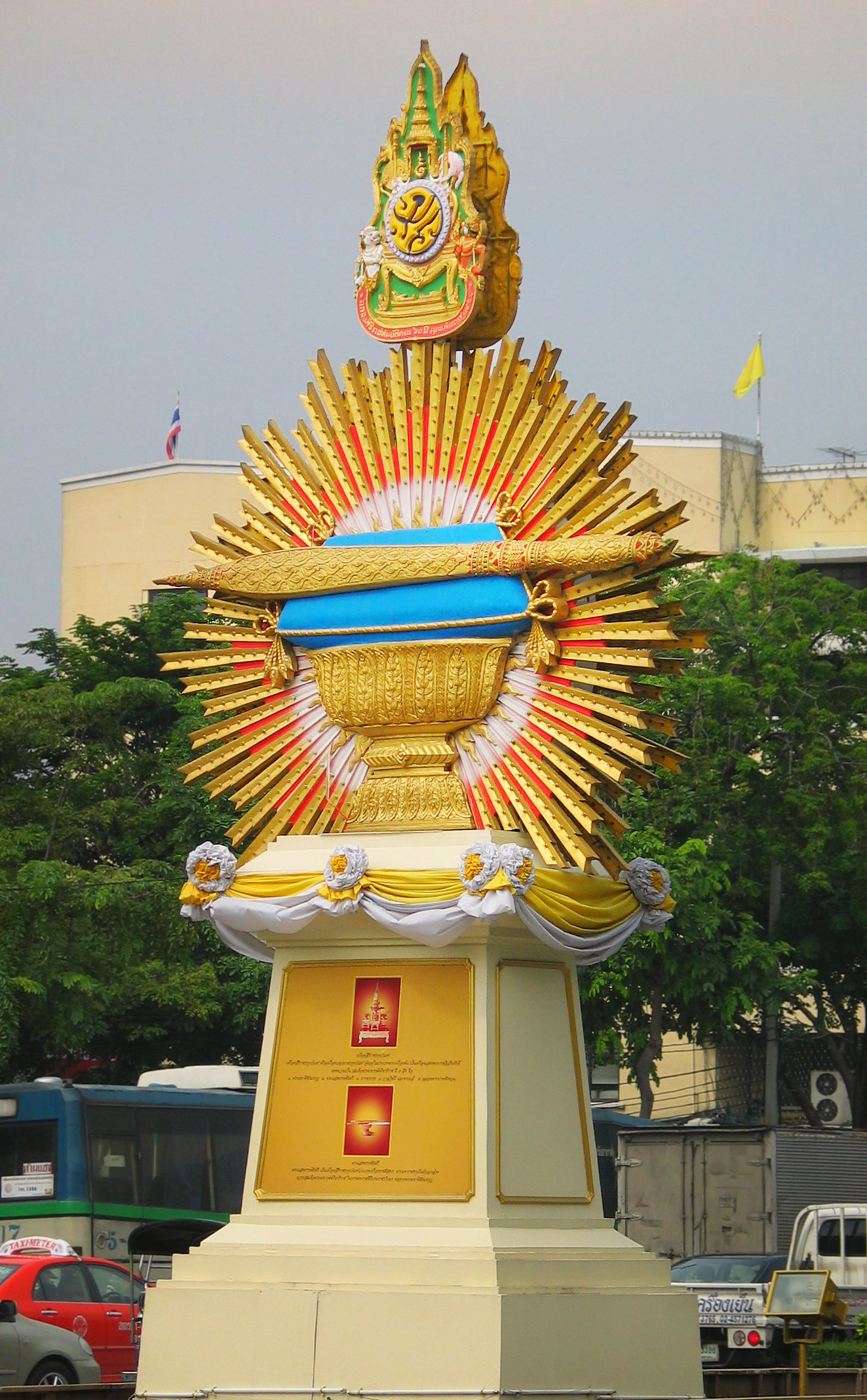
The Royal Sword

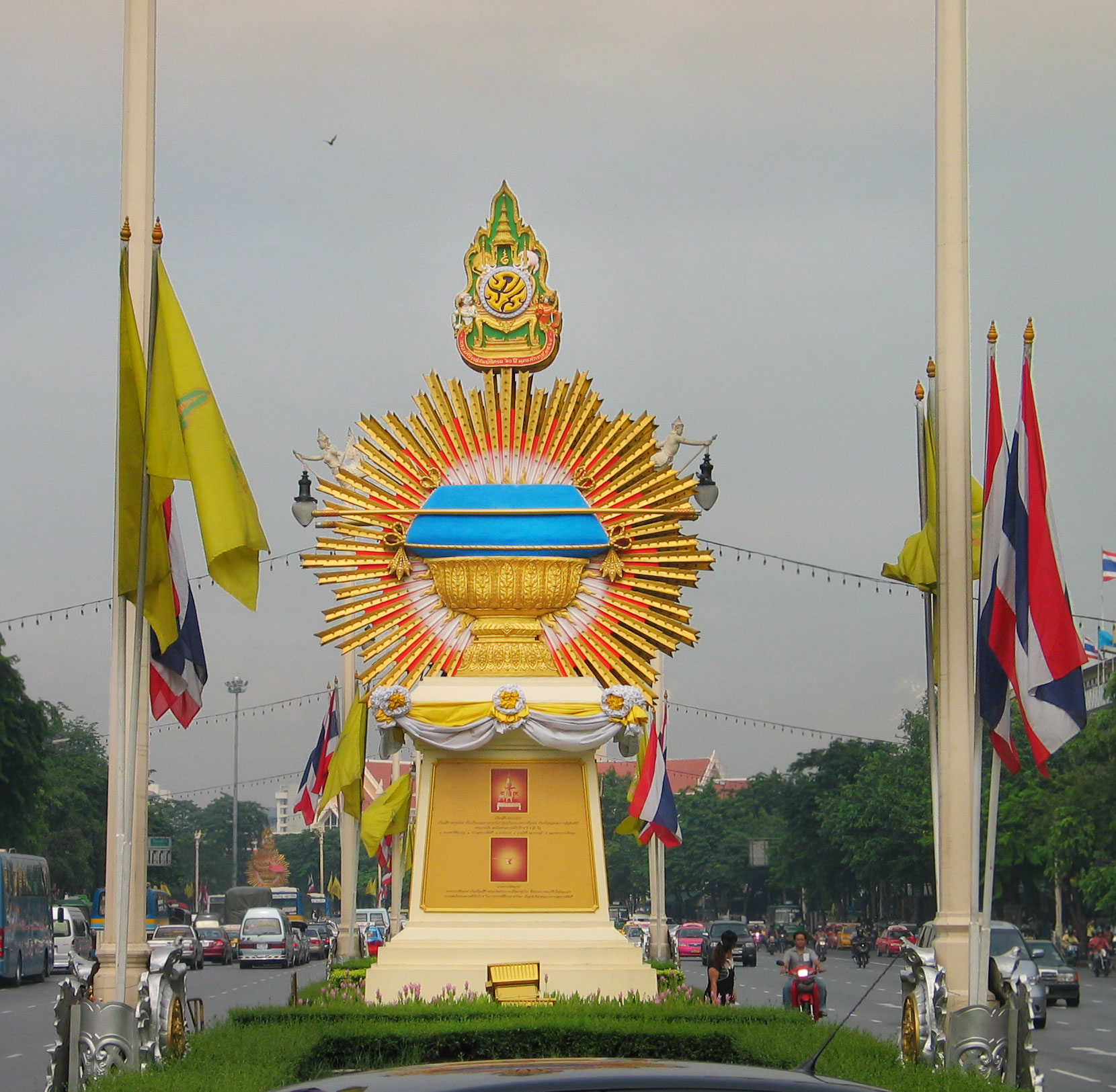
The Royal Staff

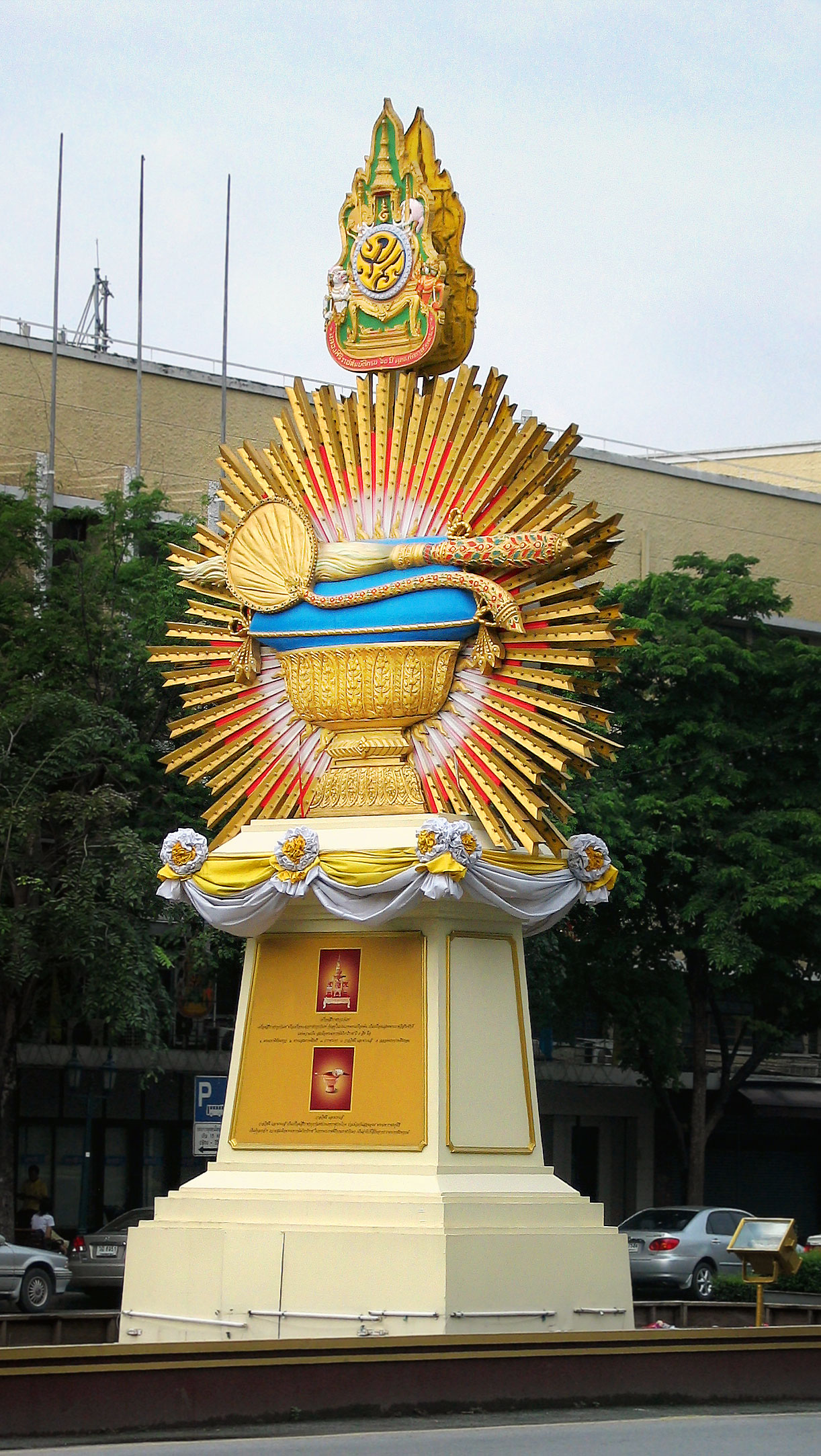
The Royal Fan and Fly Whisk

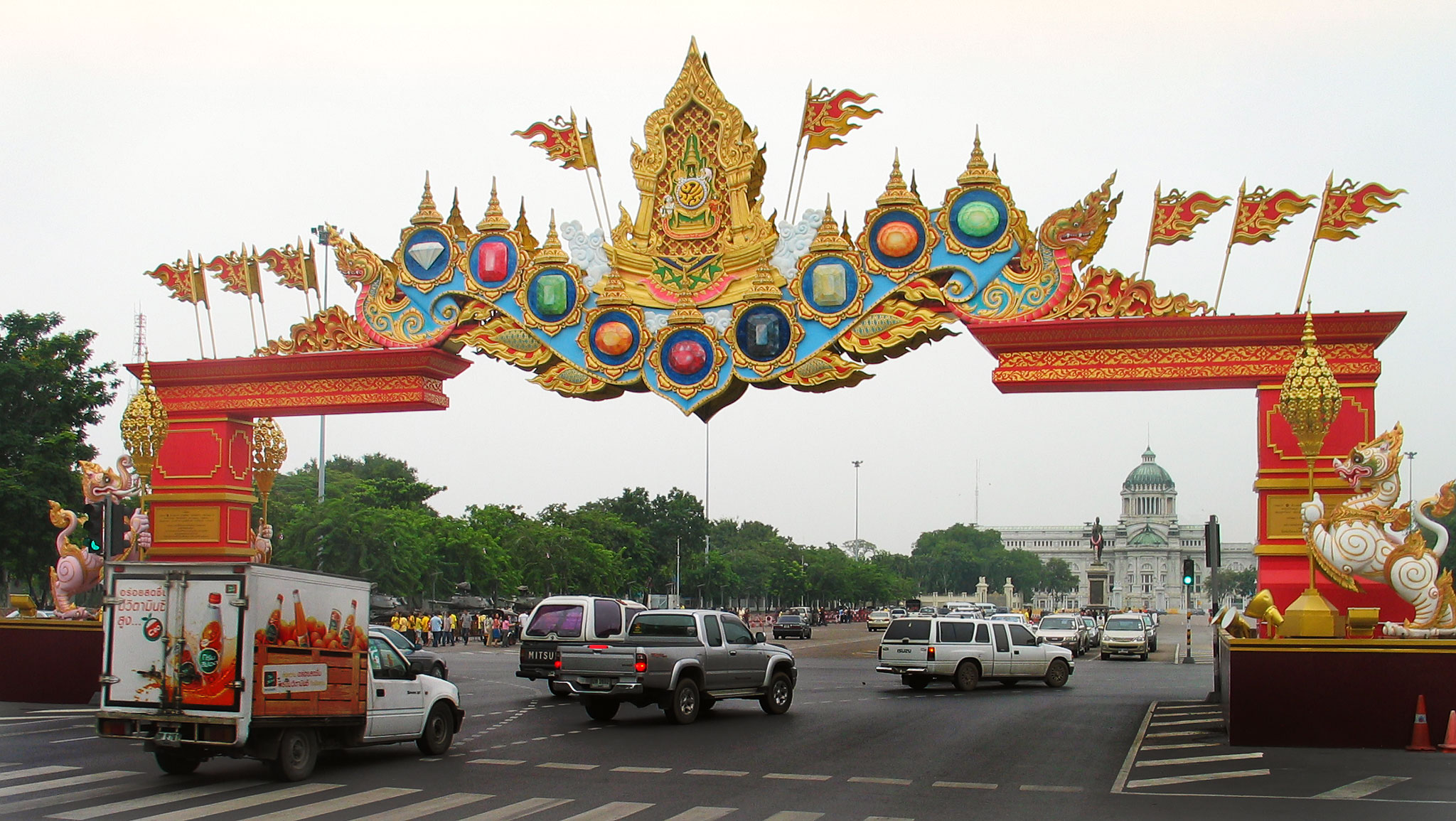
Archway "The Nine Gems"

== Literature ==
- H.G. Quadritch Wales: Siamese State Ceremonies. London 1931, Reprint by Curzon Press, Richmond 1992, ISBN 0-7007-0269-5
