= Great Crown of Victory =

One of the Royal Regalia of Thailand

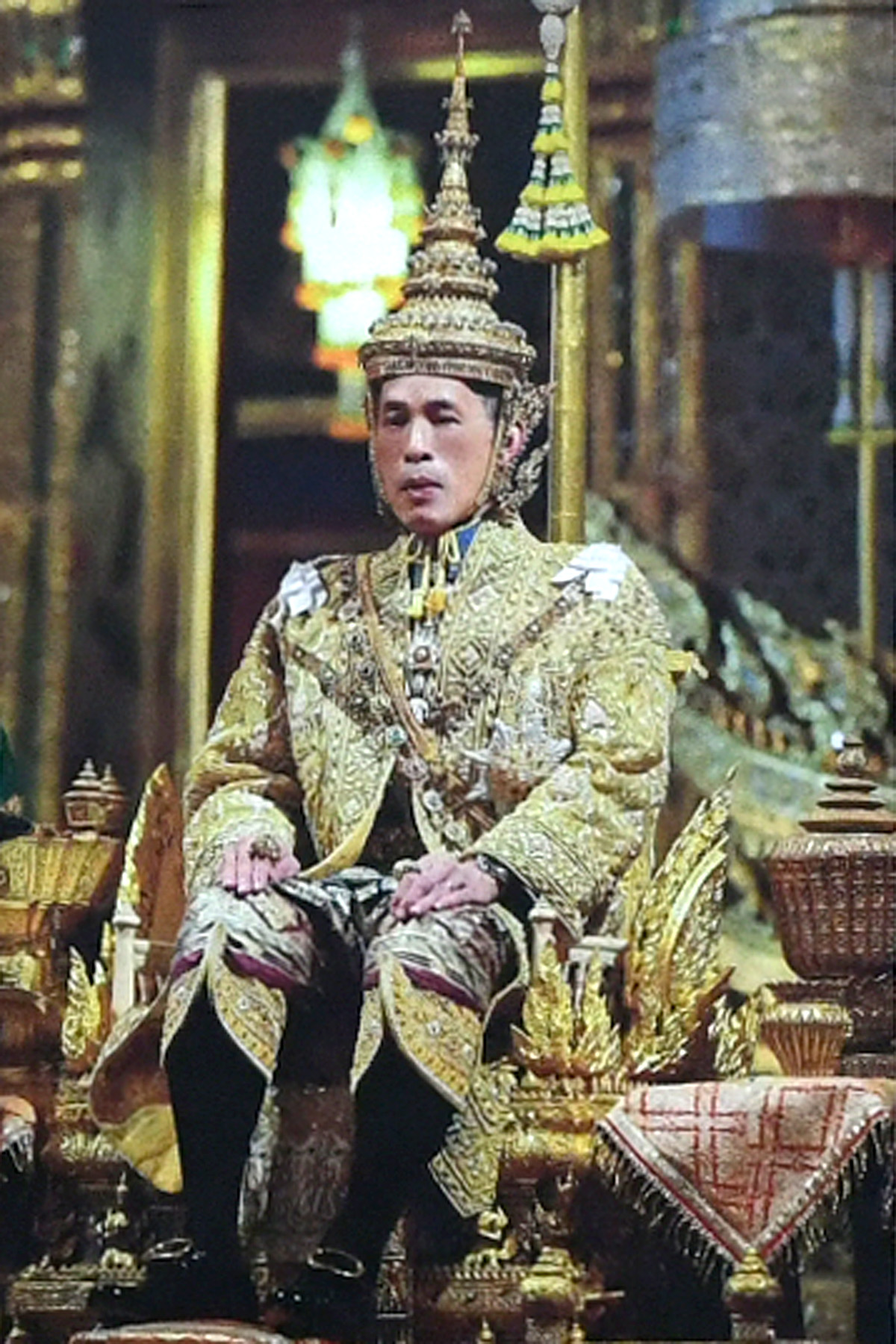
King Vajiralongkorn wearing the Great Crown of Victory during his coronation ceremony in 2019.

The Great Crown of Victory (Thai: พระมหาพิชัยมงกุฎ; RTGS: Phra Maha Phichai Mongkut) is one of the royal regalia of Thailand, made of gold and enamelled in red and green during the reign of Rama I in 1782. The crown is 66 centimetres (26 inches) high and weighs 7.3 kg (16 pounds). During the reign of Rama IV, a set of diamonds was added to the crown, including a large cut diamond from India adorning the top, known as the "Great Diamond". The crown is of a distinctive Thai design, being a multi-tiered conical diadem terminating in a tapering spire.

In Thai coronation ceremonies, the crown is worn only when a king is crowned, at which time he places it upon his own head. The shape of the crown represents the concept of divine kingship, with the tall spire signifying divine authority and the right to rule over his subjects.

== As symbol ==
The Great Crown of Victory is used as part of symbol in many public organization and educational institutions. The rank insignia of Royal Thai Army and Royal Thai Police field grade officers (Major and above) all depicts the grand crown.

== Gallery ==
The Great Crown of Victory (heraldic version)

The Great Crown of Victory (heraldic version), drawn by Hugo Gerard Ströhl

The privy seal of King Mongkut (Rama IV), depicting the Great Crown of Victory.

Flag of the Minister of Defence of Thailand since 1936.

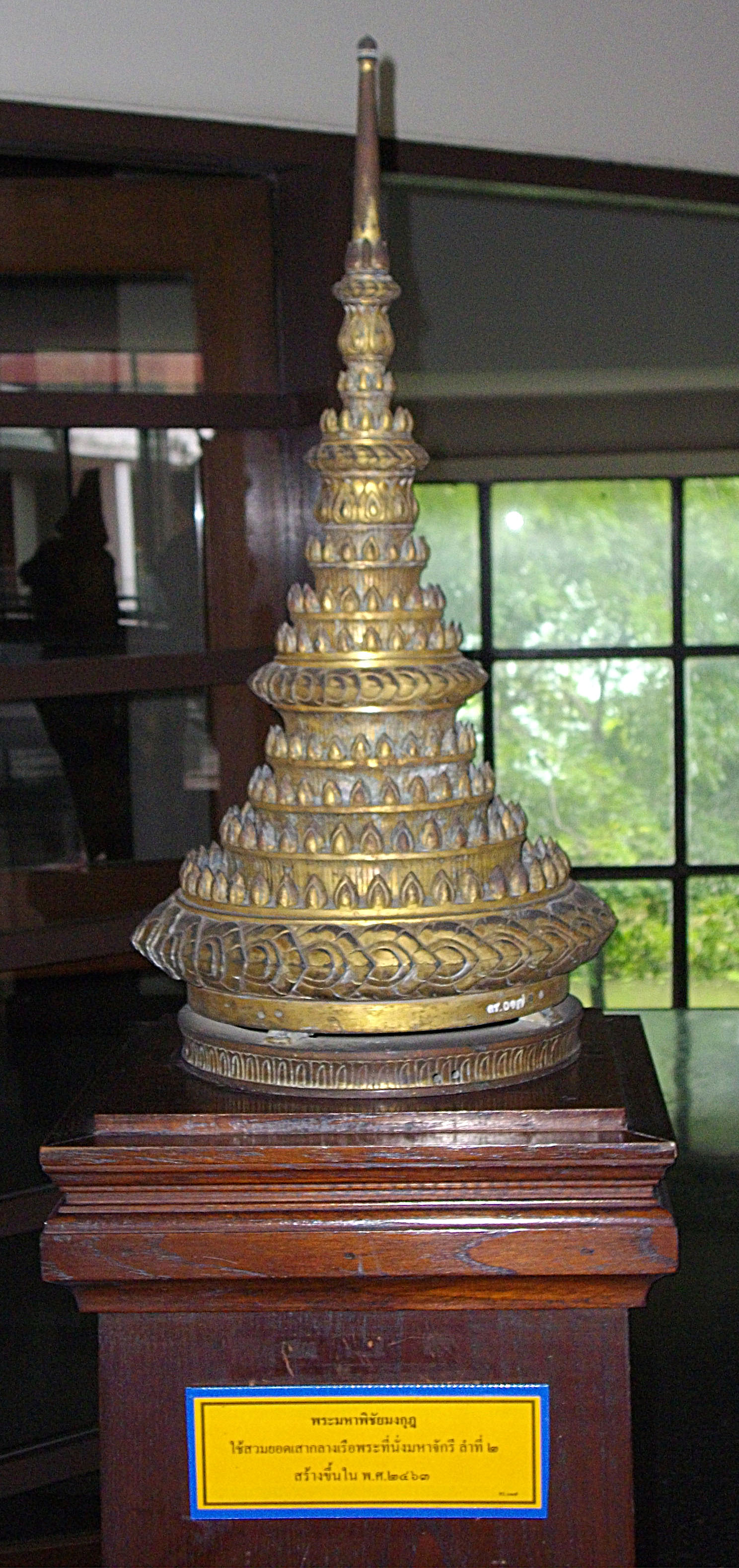
A replica of the Great Crown of Victory for the mast of the royal yacht Mahachakri II, Royal Thai Naval Museum, Samut Prakan.

== See also ==
- Chada and mongkut
- Coronation of the Thai monarch
