= List of Thai flags =

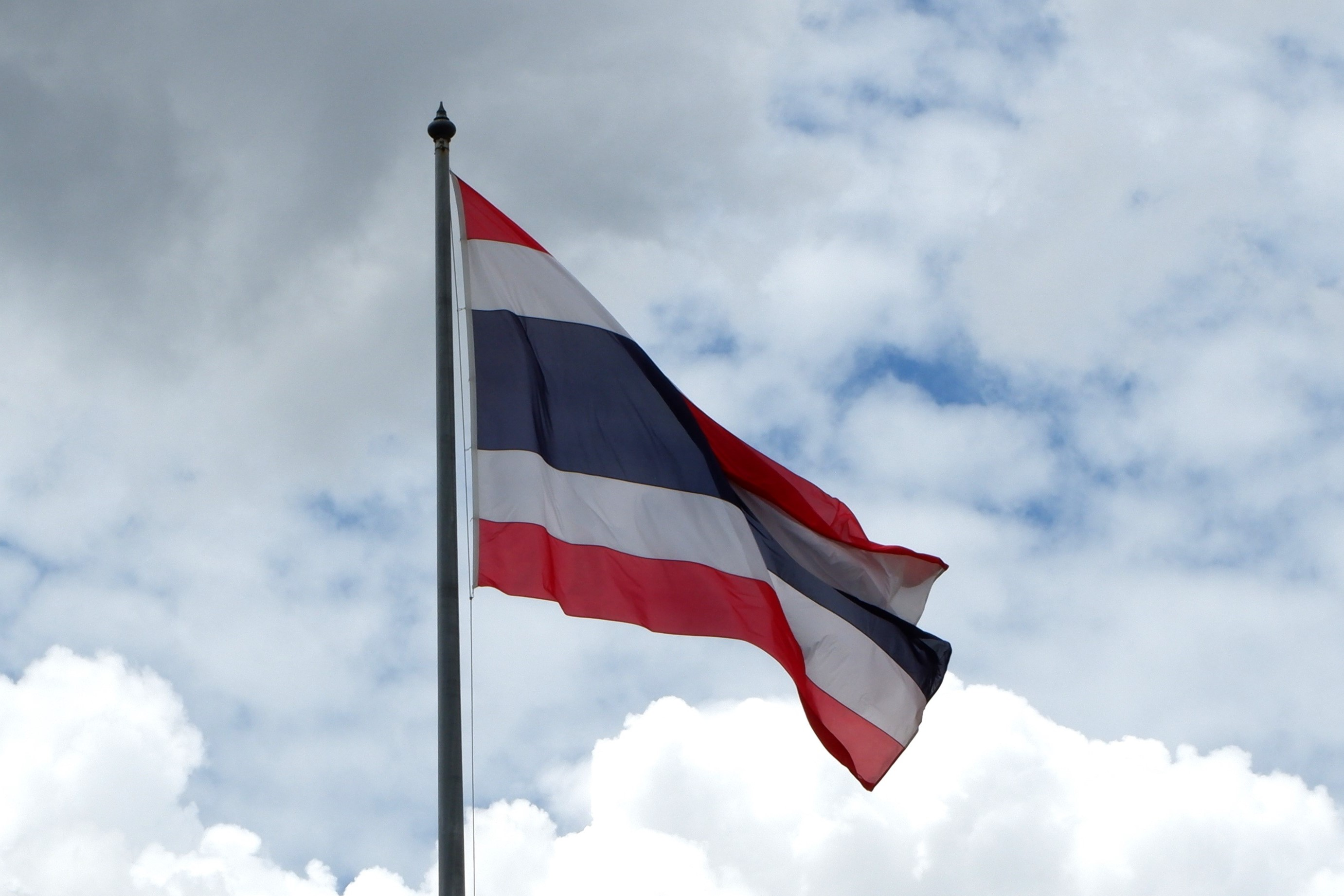
Flag of Thailand flown in front of the Ministry of Defence in 2019, after colour standardisation in 2017

This is a list of flags used in Thailand.

== National flag ==
Flag	Date	Use	Description
	1917–present	Flag of Thailand	Five horizontal stripes of red, white, blue, white and red, the middle stripe twice as wide as the others. The flag colors were officially standardized in 2017.

== Royal flags ==
=== Royal standards ===
Flag	Date	Use	Description
	1911–	Royal Standard of the King of Thailand	A yellow plain square flag with a dancing red Garuda in the center. Usually mounted in front of the car boarded by the King.
	2019 – 2025	Standard of Queen Sirikit the Queen Mother	Similar to the Royal Standard in the ratio of 2:3 with swallow-tail end and the royal monogram of Queen Sirikit at the canton.
	1911–	Standard of the Queen of Thailand	King's Standard in ratio 2:3 with swallow-tailed end.
	1979–	Standard for Senior members of the royal family (created for the Princess Mother)	Queen's Standard in ratio 2:3 with swallow-tailed end. The blue middle square depicts the Royal Crown atop two bowls on a table flanked by two five-tiered royal umbrellas.
	1911–	Standard of the Crown Prince of Thailand.	Thai king's standard with blue border.
	2019 –	Standard of Princess Maha Chakri Sirindhorn	Dark blue rectangle with the ratio of 2:3 defaced with the Royal Standard. The flag is swallow-tail and has the royal monogram of Princess Maha Chakri Sirindhorn at the canton.
	2019 –	Standard of Princess Chulabhorn Krom Phra Srisavangavadhana	Dark blue rectangle defaced with yellow circle. The circle features the red Garuda. At the canton of the blue field has the royal monogram of Princess Chulabhorn Walailak. The flag is swallow-tail
	1911–	Standard for the Crown Princess of Thailand.	Blue 2:3 rectangle defaced with King's Standard. The flag is swallow-tailed.
	1911–	Standard for other princes in the Chakri dynasty.	Blue square defaced with yellow circle. The circle features red Garuda.
	1911–	Standard for other princesses in the Chakri dynasty.	Standard for the male royalties in ratio 2:3 with swallow-tailed end.
	1936–	Standard for the Regent of Thailand.	A white plain square flag with the Garuda and a shield depicting the National Flag in the center.

=== Personal royal flags ===
Flag	Date	Use	Description
	2016–present	Personal Flag of King Vajiralongkorn	Yellow flag (the King's birthday colour), the middle the depicts the Royal Cypher (ว.ป.ร.: มหาวชิราลงกรณ ปรมราชาธิราช : Mahavajiralongkorn Paramarajadhiraja (Thai equivalent to Vajiralongkorn Rex), topped by the Great Crown of Victory, in between is the Thai numeral of 10.
	2019–present	Personal Flag of Queen Suthida	Purple flag (the Queen's birthday colour), the middle the depicts the Royal Cypher (ส.ท.: สุทิดา : Suthida), the middle is Queen Suthida's Royal Cypher, topped by the Great Crown of Victory.
	1977–present	Personal Flag of Princess Maha Chakri Sirindhorn	Purple flag (the Princess' birthday colour), the middle the depicts the Royal Cypher (ส.ธ.: สิรินธร : Sirindhorn), the middle is the Royal Cypher, topped by the simplified crown.
	1982–present	Personal Flag of Princess Chulabhorn Walailak	Orange flag (the Princess' birthday colour), the middle the depicts the Royal Cypher (จ.ภ.: จุฬาภรณวลัยลักษณ์ : Chulabhorn), the middle is the Royal Cypher, topped by the simplified crown.
	2001–present	Personal Flag of Princess Ubolratana Rajakanya	Red flag (the Princess' birthday colour), the middle the depicts the Royal Cypher (อ.ร.: อุบลรัตนราชกัญญา : Ubolratana), the middle is the Royal Cypher, but not topped by the simplified crown.
	1977–present	Personal Flag of Princess Soamsawali	Purple flag (the Princess' birthday colour), the middle the depicts the Royal Cypher (ส.ส.: โสมสวลี : Soamsawali), the middle is the Royal Cypher, under the Buddhist/Hindu sacred sign of "Unalome".
	2019–present	Personal Flag of Princess Sirivannavari Nariratana	Orange flag (the Princess' birthday colour), the middle the depicts the Royal Cypher (ส.ร.: สิริวัณณวรีนารีรัตน์ : Sirivannavari), the middle is the Royal Cypher, topped by the simplified crown.
	2019–present	Personal Flag of Prince Dipangkorn Rasmijoti	Blue flag (the Prince's birthday colour), the middle the depicts the Royal Cypher (ท.ป.: ทีปังกรรัศมีโชติ : Dipangkorn), the middle is the Royal Cypher, topped by the simplified crown.
	1982–present	Personal Flag of Princess Siribhachudabhorn	Blue flag (the Princess' birthday colour), the middle the depicts the Royal Cypher (ส.ภ.: สิริภาจุฑาภรณ์ : Siribhachudabhorn), the middle is the Royal Cypher, topped by the glowing tiara.
	2016–present	Personal Flag of Princess Aditayadornkitikhun	Purple flag (the Princess' birthday colour), the middle the depicts the Royal Cypher (อ.ก.: อทิตยาทรกิติคุณ : Aditayadornkitikhun), the middle is the Royal Cypher.

== Royal Thai Government flags ==
Flag	Date	Use	Description
	1979–	Flag of the prime minister of Thailand	White flag in ratio 5:6 with the Prime Minister's seal under the royal crown.
	1939–	Flag of the agriculture and cooperatives ministry of Thailand	Green flag with the Emblem of the Ministry of Agriculture and Cooperatives in the center. The emblem depicts Varuna standing top of a nāga.
	1920–	Flag of the commerce of Thailand	Blue flag with the Emblem of the Ministry of Commerce in the center. The emblem depicts Vishvakarma.
	2002–	Flag of the culture ministry of Thailand	Purple flag with the Emblem of the Ministry of Culture in the center. The emblem depicts a burning baldachin.
	1936–	Flag of the defence minister of Thailand	White flag in ratio 5:6 with the Emblem of the Ministry of Defence in the center. The emblem consists of a red chakra (Army), the dark blue anchor (Navy) and the sky blue wings (Air Force).
	2016–	Flag of the digital economy and society ministry of Thailand	Green flag with the Emblem of the Ministry of Digital Economy and Society of Thailand in the center. The emblem depicts Budha holding a scripture and a sword, with halo.
	1892–	Flag of the education ministry of Thailand	Yellow flag with the Emblem of the Ministry of Education in the center. The emblem depicts a sema Thammachak (boundary marker of a temple with dharmacakra).
	1892–	Flag of the interior ministry of Thailand	Blue flag with the Emblem of the Ministry of Interior in the center. The emblem depicts a rajasiha (a lion).
	1979–	Flag of the president of the National Assembly of Thailand	White flag in ratio 5:6 with the National Assembly of Thailand's seal under the royal crown.
	1979–	Flag of the president of the Supreme Court of Thailand	White flag in ratio 5:6 with the Supreme Court of Thailand's seal under the royal crown.

== Naval flags ==
Flag	Date	Use	Description
	1917–	Naval Jack	A national flag with the emblem of Royal Thai Navy in the center: a chakra inserted with an anchor under the Thai royal crown. The design is identical to Thai naval unit colours. Note that all Thai Army, Navy and Air Force unit colours called "Thong Chai Chalermphol" (ธงชัยเฉลิมพล).
	1917–	Naval Ensign	A red disc containing a white elephant in regalia centred on the national flag.

== Military flags ==
Flag	Date	Use	Description
	1979–	Royal Thai Armed Forces Headquarters Flag	Red, Navy blue and Sky blue flag with the emblem of Royal Thai Armed Forces: at the center of the tricolour is a badge of the Headquarters with a golden Chakra, with an anchor with golden chains and golden Wings, surrounded by a golden wreath. (from Flag law B.E.2522 (1979)).
	1979–	Royal Thai Army Flag	Red flag with the emblem of Royal Thai Army: a chakra under Unalom and the Thai royal crown with rays flanked by the wreaths (from Flag law B.E.2522 (1979)).
	1979–	Royal Thai Navy Flag	Navy blue flag with the emblem of Royal Thai Navy in the white circle (from Flag law B.E.2522 (1979)).
	1979–	Royal Thai Air Force Flag	Blue sky flag with the emblem of Royal Thai Air Force: wings with Unalom under the Thai royal crown and rays (from Flag law B.E.2522 (1979)).
	1979–	Flag for Chief of Defence Forces	Red, Navy blue and Sky blue flag with the emblem of Royal Thai Armed Forces with five stars underneath.
	1979–	Flag for Commander-in-Chief of the Royal Thai Army	Red flag with the emblem of Royal Thai Army with five stars underneath.
	1897–	Flag for Commander-in-Chief of the Royal Thai Navy	Navy blue flag with the emblem of Royal Thai Navy.
	1979–	Flag for Commander-in-Chief of the Royal Thai Air Force	Sky blue flag with yellow borders and the emblem of Royal Thai Air Force with a shield depicting the National flag.

== Police flag ==
Flag	Date	Use	Description
	1958–	Royal Thai Police Headquarters	Maroon red flag with the emblem of the Thai National Police in the center.
	1979–	Pitak Santiraj flag	An honour flag of the Royal Thai Police according to the Thai Flag Act of B.E. 2522 (1979). It has the same characteristics and colors as the National Flag but in the centre of the flag is the coat of arms of Siam during the reign of King Chulalongkorn (Rama V), with the words "To Protect the People's Peace" (พิทักษ์สันติราษฎร์ – pronounce "Pitak Santiraj") embroidered in silver metallic threads embracing the underside of the coat of arms.

== Religious flags ==
Flag	Date	Use	Description
	1958–	The Dharmacakra flag—Buddhism	Yellow is color of Buddhism, the middle the depicts the Red Thammachak, symbol of The Buddhism Organizations and Buddhists in Thailand.
	1988–	The Cross Flag—Christianity	A white rectangle with a red Latin cross in the center, symbol of the Christian Organizations and Christians in Thailand.
	1997–	The Jihad Flag—Islam	A black or green rectangle with white Shahada in the center. meaning that "there is no other god but Allah, and Muhammad is the Messenger of Allah," symbol of the Muslim Organizations and Muslims in Thailand.

== Diplomatic flags ==
Flag	Date	Use	Description
	1927–	Ambassador Standard of Thailand	A blue disc containing a white elephant in regalia centred on the national flag.
	1927–	Consular Flag of Thailand	Triranga surmounted with blue disc containing a white elephant.

== Provincial flags ==
Flag	Date	Use	Description
	1993–present	Flag of Amnat Charoen Province	Purple field. In the center of the flag is the provincial seal, featuring Phra Mongkol Ming Mueang, a revered Buddha statue significant to the province.
		Flag of Ang Thong Province	Bicolor flag with yellow on the top half and green on the bottom half. In the center of the flag is the provincial seal.
	1972–present	Flag of Bangkok	Green flag with the Seal of the Bangkok Metropolitan, in white at the center. Used by the Bangkok Metropolitan Administration and the Governor of Bangkok.
	2011–present	Flag of Bueng Kan Province	Rectangular flag consisting of three horizontal stripes in the proportions of purple, white, and purple. In the center of the flag is the provincial seal.
		Flag of Buriram Province	Purple and orange flag split in half vertically with the purple on the left and the orange on the right with the provincial seal in the center.
	2007–present	Flag of Chachoengsao Province	Rectangular field of dark red (maroon.) In the center of the flag is the provincial seal, which depicts Wat Sothonwararam.
		Flag of Chai Nat Province	Provincial seal set against a magenta background, which is the symbolic color of the province.
	1942–present	Flag of Chaiyaphum Province	Horizontal stripes in brown, orange, and brown. In the center of the flag is the provincial seal, depicting the "Thong Sam Chai," an ancient victory flag of the army.
	1997–present	Flag of Chanthaburi Province	A red field. In the center of the flag is the provincial seal, with the text "จังหวัดจันทบุรี" (Chanthaburi Province) displayed below the seal.
		Flag of Chiang Mai Province	Rectangular flag with a blue field. In the center of the flag is the provincial seal, which features a white elephant standing within a traditional Thai ornate structure "Ruen Kaew."
	1942–present	Flag of Chiang Rai Province	Rectangular flag with vertical stripes in blue, purple, and blue. The central purple stripe features a white elephant and a text banner displaying the province's name.
	1942–present	Flag of Chonburi Province	Rectangular flag with horizontal stripes in dark red, yellow, and dark red. In the center of the flag is provincial seal consisting of Kao Sam Muk and the sea.
		Flag of Chumphon Province	Blue field. In the center of the flag is the provincial seal, which depicts a goddess standing in a blessing gesture in front of a fort, flanked by two fig trees.
		Flag of Kalasin Province	Horizontal stripes in green, orange, and green. In the center of the flag is the provincial seal, which is a circular emblem containing images of grass, a black water pond (symbolizing the name "Kalasin"), mountains, and rain clouds. Below features a white text that reads "จังหวัดกาฬสินธุ์" (Kalasin Province) in a semi-circular arc.
		Flag of Kamphaeng Phet Province	Rectangular flag with three horizontal stripes. The top stripe is yellow, the middle stripe is red, and the bottom stripe is leaf green. In the center of the red stripe is the provincial seal.
		Flag of Kanchanaburi Province	A blue flag with the central area in vermillion colour and the provincial seal in the center.
		Flag of Khon Kaen Province	Maroon field. In the center of the flag is the provincial emblem, which depicts a stupa (Phra That Kham Kaen) built on a tree stump.
		Flag of Krabi Province	Two horizontal stripes. The top stripe is yellow, and the bottom stripe is blue. In the center of the flag is the provincial seal.
		Flag of Lampang Province	Rectangular flag with a green field. In the center of the flag is the provincial seal, which features a white rooster standing within a mandapa structure of Wat Phra That Lampang Luang.
		Flag of Lamphun Province	Rectangular flag with a blue field. In the center of the flag is the provincial seal, which features Phra That Hariphunchai. Below the emblem is the text "จังหวัดลำพูน" (Lamphun Province).
		Flag of Loei Province	Rectangular flag with a blue field. In the center of the flag is the provincial emblem, which features Phra That Si Song Rak within a circle. Below the emblem is the text "จังหวัดเลย" (Loei Province).
		Flag of Lopburi Province	Horizontal stripes in blue, white, and blue. In the center of the flag is the provincial emblem, which depicts the four-armed Narai standing in front of Phra Prang Sam Yot.
		Flag of Mae Hong Son Province	Rectangular flag divided horizontally into three equal parts: brown, blue, and brown. In the center of the blue stripe is the provincial seal within a red circle.
		Flag of Maha Sarakham Province	Yellow field with a brown stripe running horizontally through the center. Within the brown stripe is the provincial seal.
	1982–present	Flag of Mukdahan Province	White field, with red borders on three sides (except for the side attached to the flagpole.) In the center of the flag is the provincial seal.
		Flag of Nakhon Nayok Province	Green field. In the center of the flag is the provincial seal, which depicts an elephant holding a sheaf of rice. Below the emblem is a yellow ribbon with the text "นครนายก" (Nakhon Nayok Province).
		Flag of Nakhon Pathom Province	Blue field. In the center of the flag is the provincial seal, which depicts Phra Pathom Chedi. The emblem is adorned with the Thai numeral "4" within the Great Crown of Victory. Below the emblem is the text "นครปฐม" (Nakhon Pathom Province) in white.
		Flag of Nakhon Phanom Province	Rectangular flag divided horizontally into two stripes. The top stripe is red and the bottom stripe is black. In the center of the flag is the provincial seal, which features Phra That Phanom.
		Flag of Nakhon Ratchasima Province	Orange field. In the center of the flag is the provincial seal, which depicts the monument of Thao Suranari in front of the Chumphon Gate.
		Flag of Nakhon Sawan Province	Blue field. In the center of the flag is the provincial seal, which features an image of a three-spired vimana.
	1942–present	Flag of Nakhon Si Thammarat Province	Rectangular flag divided horizontally into two stripes. Purple on the top and yellow on the bottom. In the center of the flag is the provincial seal, which features Phra Borommathat Chedi of Wat Phra Mahathat Woramahawihan, surrounded by the symbols of the twelve zodiac signs.
		Flag of Nan Province	Rectangular flag divided horizontally into two stripes. Purple on the top and yellow on the bottom. In the center of the flag is the provincial seal, which features Phra That Chae Haeng on top of Usuparatch
		Flag of Narathiwat Province	Yellow square at the hoist. Within the yellow square is the provincial seal, which features an image of a Kolae boat with a fully unfurled sail. On the sail is an image of a white elephant adorned with royal regalia, representing Phra Sri Nararatt Rajakarini, an important elephant presented to King Bhumibol Adulyadej by Narathiwat Province in 1977. The remaining part of the flag consists of seven horizontal stripes in alternating red and white, with four red stripes and three white stripes.
	1993–present	Flag of Nong Bua Lamphu Province	White field. In the center of the flag is the provincial seal, which depicts a statue of King Naresuan standing in front of a shrine. In the background is Nong Bua Lamphu Lake. Below the emblem, there is a ribbon tied in a knot at both ends, with the text "จังหวัดหนองบัวลำภู" (Nong Bua Lamphu Province) inside.
		Flag of Nong Khai Province	Horizontal stripes in brown, red, and brown. In the center of the flag is the provincial seal, which features an image of bamboo clumps by a pond.
		Flag of Nonthaburi Province	Vertical stripes in purple and blue. In the center of the flag is the provincial seal, which features an intricately decorated earthenware pot. Symbolized the long-standing pottery-making tradition of the people of Nonthaburi Province.
		Flag of Pathum Thani Province	Vertical stripes in blue and white. In the center of the flag is the provincial seal, which features a lotus flower and a pair of rice sheaf rising above the water.
		Flag of Pattani Province	Rectangular flag divided horizontally into two stripes. yellow on the top and green on the bottom. In the center of the flag is an image of the Phaya Tani cannon.
	2004–present	Flag of Phang Nga Province	Rectangular flag with vertical stripes in blue, yellow, and pink. In the center of the flag is the provincial seal, which features an image of a mining dredge, Khao Tapu, and Khao Chang.
		Flag of Phatthalung Province	Horizontal stripes in yellow, purple, and yellow. In the center of the flag is the provincial seal, which features an image of Khao Ok Thalu.
		Flag of Phayao Province	Magenta field. In the center of the flag is the provincial seal.
	1942–present	Flag of Phetchabun Province	Horizontal stripes in green, white, and green. In the center of the flag is the provincial seal.
		Flag of Phetchaburi Province	Rectangular flag with blue, yellow, and blue horizontal stripes. In the center of the yellow stripe is the provincial seal, which features an image of a rice field, sugar palm trees, and Phra Nakhon Khiri within a circular frame.
		Flag of Phichit Province	Rectangular flag divided into five stripes, three dark green stripes alternating with two white stripes. In the center of the flag is the provincial seal.
		Flag of Phitsanulok Province	Purple field. In the center of the flag is the provincial seal, which depicts Phra Buddha Chinaraj within a circular frame adorned with Thai decorative patterns.
	2023–present	Flag of Phrae Province	Vertical stripes in Green and red. In the center of the flag is the provincial seal, which features an image of Phra That Cho Hae stupa placed on the back of a horse.
	1942–present	Flag of Phra Nakhon Si Ayutthaya Province	Rectangular flag with vertical stripes in blue, light blue, and blue. In the center of the flag is the provincial seal, which features a conch shell on the pedestal tray in the pavilion under the Cordia dichotoma tree.
		Flag of Phuket Province	Light blue field. In the center of the flag is the provincial seal, which features the statue of Thao Thep Krasattri and Thao Si Sunthon.
	1942–present	Flag of Prachin Buri Province	Red field at the hoist, which is designated as the regional color. In the center of the flag is the provincial seal, which features an image of a Bodhi tree within a circular frame, The fly end of the flag features a yellow stripe.
		Flag of Prachuap Khiri Khan Province	Yellow field. In the center of the flag is the provincial seal.
		Flag of Ranong Province	Green square at the hoist. Within the green square is the provincial emblem, which features an image of a castle on the clouds. The remaining part of the flag consists of seven horizontal stripes in alternating yellow and orange, with four yellow stripes and three orange stripes.
		Flag of Ratchaburi Province	Blue field. In the center of the flag is the provincial seal, which depicts regalia.
		Flag of Rayong Province	Rectangular flag with vertical stripes in red, yellow, and blue. In the center of the flag is the provincial seal, which features an image of a royal pavilion where King Chulalongkorn resided on Ko Samet.
	2002-present	Flag of Roi Et Province	Yellow field. In the center of the flag is the provincial seal.
	1993-present	Flag of Sa Kaeo Province	Rectangular flag divided horizontally into two stripes. yellow on the top and green on the bottom. In the center of the flag is the provincial seal.
		Flag of Sakon Nakhon Province	Rectangular flag divided horizontally into two stripes. blue on the top and yellow on the bottom. In the center of the flag is the provincial seal, which features an image of Wat Phra That Choeng Chum.
		Flag of Samut Prakan Province	Light blue field. In the center of the flag is the provincial seal.
	1946–present	Flag of Samut Sakhon Province	Horizontal stripes in pink, light blue, and pink. In the center of the flag is the provincial seal.
		Flag of Samut Songkhram Province	Vertical stripes in blue, white, and blue. In the center of the flag is the provincial seal.
	2021–present	Flag of Saraburi Province	Horizontal stripes in red, white, and red. In the center of the flag is the provincial seal.
	1942–present	Flag of Satun Province	Green field, with yellow borders on three sides (except for the side attached to the flagpole.) In the center of the flag is the provincial seal.
	2004–present	Flag of Sing Buri Province	Red field, in the center of the flag is the provincial seal, which features an image of a monument honoring the eleven leaders of Khai Bang Rachan.
		Flag of Sisaket Province	Rectangular flag divided horizontally into two stripes. Orange on the top and white on the bottom. In the center of the flag is the provincial seal.
		Flag of Songkhla Province	A cyan field. The center of the flag features a conch shell on a pedestal tray.
		Flag of Sukhothai Province	Horizontal stripes in red, yellow, and green. In the upper left corner of the flag is the provincial seal.
		Flag of Suphan Buri Province	Horizontal stripes in blue, orange, and blue. In the center of the flag is the provincial seal, which depicts the elephant duel between Naresuan and Mingyi Swa.
		Flag of Surat Thani Province	Rectangular flag divided horizontally into two stripes. Orange on the top and Yellow on the bottom. In the center of the flag is the provincial seal.
		Flag of Surin Province	Horizontal stripes in red, yellow, and green. In the center of the flag is the provincial seal.
		Flag of Tak Province	Purple and yellow flag with 7 stripes: 4 purple and 3 yellow. On the side next to the flagpole is a triangular blue field with the provincial seal, which features an image of Naresuanpouring water over the neck of an elephant.
		Flag of Trang Province	Horizontal stripes in light blue, white, and light blue. In the center of the flag is the provincial seal.
	1942–present	Flag of Trat Province	Horizontal stripes in blue and red. In the center of the flag is the provincial seal.
		Flag of Ubon Ratchathani Province	Two horizontal stripes. The upper half of the flag has a pink lotus flower embroidered on a pink background. The lower half contains the province's name "อุบลราชธานี" (Ubon Ratchathani) in white, embroidered on a green background.
		Flag of Udon Thani Province	Orange field. In the center of the flag is the provincial seal.
		Flag of Uthai Thani Province	Rectangular flag divided horizontally into two stripes. yellow on the top and green on the bottom. In the center of the flag is the provincial seal.
		Flag of Uttaradit Province	A rectangular flag with an orange background and two dark purple stripes intersecting in the shape of a cross. In the center is the provincial seal, featuring a stone throne covered by a yellow pavilion, flanked by dark blue scroll patterns. In front of the pavilion is a red Garuda, all enclosed within a circular frame with a 70-centimeter diameter. The name of the province is inscribed around the edge of the circle.
		Flag of Yala Province	Rectangular flag divided horizontally into two stripes. green on the top and white on the bottom. In the center of the flag is the provincial seal.
	1972–present	Flag of Yasothon Province	Rectangular flag divided horizontally into two stripes. pink on the top and light blue on the bottom. In the center of the flag is the provincial seal.

== City flags ==
Flag	Date	Use	Description
		Flag of Khon Kaen	A light-blue field with the city seal in the center.
		Flag of Lampang	A green field with the city seal in the center.
		Flag of Mae Sot	A green field with the golden city seal in the center.
		Flag of Nonthaburi	Flag divided horizontally into three stripes, top being red, middle being yellow-gold, and bottom being blue. In the center of the flag, there is a golden city seal and a curved text that says "เทศบาลนครนนทบุรี" which means "Nonthaburi City Municipality".
		Flag of Om Noi	A purple field with the city seal in the center.
		Flag of Pak Kret	A red field with the city seal in the center.
		Flag of Pattaya	A blue field with the city seal surrounded by a white outline in the center.
		Flag of Phitsanulok	A light-purple field with the city seal in the center.
		Flag of Rangsit	Flag divided horizontally into two stripes, the top being red, the bottom being blue. In the center of the flag is the city seal.
		Flag of Rayong	A green field with the city seal in the center.
		Flag of Sakhon Nakhon	A reddish-brown field with the city seal in the center.
		Flag of Trang	A light-blue field with the city seal in the center.
		Flag of Udon Thani	An orange field with the city seal a bit over the center, below there is a text that says "เทศบาลนครอุดรธานี" which means "Udon Thani City Municipality".

== Historical flags ==
Flag	Date	Use	Description
	c. 1351–1782	Ensign of Siam	A red plain rectangular flag.
	1782–1817	State ensign of Siam	Red flag with a white chakra.
	1817–1832	State ensign of Siam	Red flag with a white elephant inside the chakra.
	1832–1916	Flag of Siam	A white elephant facing to the hoist in the red flag. Called in Thai language "Thong Chang Phueak" (ธงช้างเผือก) (the white elephant flag). Commonly attributed to Rama IV's reign but was first implemented during the reign of Rama III.
	1916–1917	State flag and ensign of Siam	Red flag with a white elephant in regalia.
	1917	Former flag of Siam	Five horizontal stripes flag like the Trairanga with the only major difference being that the middle stripe is red. It is currently used by several anti-monarchists due to its omission of the colour blue which symbolizes the monarchy.

=== Naval jacks ===
Flag	Date	Use	Description
	1881–1897	Naval Ensign of Siam	Red flag with a white elephant in regalia, with a white Chakra at the top corner.
	1898–1912	Naval Ensign of Siam	Red flag with a white elephant in regalia.
	1912–1917	Naval Ensign of Siam	Red flag with a white elephant in regalia, with the emblem of the Royal Thai Navy at the top corner.
	1855–1881	Naval Jack of Siam	Blue flag with a white elephant.
	1881–1917	Naval Jack of Siam	Blue flag with a white elephant in regalia.

=== War flags ===
Flag	Date	Use	Description
	1917–1918	Standard of the Siamese Expeditionary Force, Obverse	Triranga defaced with a red disc containing dressed white elephant, facing a flagpole. Briefly, its appearance is the same as naval ensign, but both red banners of the flag contains a stanza from a Buddhist chant in Pali (the Jayamangala Gatha), written in Thai script: "พาหุํสหัส์สมภินิม์มิตสาวุธัน์ตํ ค๎รีเมขลํอุทิตโฆรสเสนมารํ ทานาทิธัม์มวิธินาชิตวามุนิน์โท ตัน์เตชสาภวตุเมชยสิทธินิจ์จํ".
	1917–1918	Standard of the Siamese Expeditionary Force, Reverse	Triranga defaced with a red disc containing King Vajiravudh's personal emblem. The emblem features Thai acronym "ร.ร." and Thai digit six ("๖"), both are displayed under the glowing crown. Both red banners of the flag contains the same chant in Thai script as the obverse.

=== Diplomatic flags ===
Flag	Date	Use	Description
	1873–1912	Ambassadorial Standard of Siam	State flag with the crowned arms of Siam at its canton.
	1873–1912	Consular Flag of Siam	State flag with the escutcheon of Siam at its canton.
	1912–1917	Ambassadorial Standard of Siam	State flag with blue circle at its canton. The circle contains Garuda holding crown.
	1912–1917	Consular Flag of Siam	State flag with blue circle at its canton. The circle contains Garuda with outstretched wings.
	1917–1927	Ambassadorial Standard and Consular Flag of Siam	Triranga surmounted with white elephant, facing a pole.

=== Prime Minister flags ===
Flag	Date	Use	Description
	1936–1939	Flag of the Prime Minister	
	1939–1943	Flag of the Prime Minister	
	1943–1979	Flag of the Prime Minister	

=== Royal Thai Government flags ===
Flag	Date	Use	Description
	1938–1941	Flag of the Minister of Economy	
	1938–1979	Flag of the Minister of Education	
	1938–1979	Flag of the Minister of Finance	
	1938–1979	Flag of the Minister of Foreign Affair	
	1938–1979	Flag of the Minister of Interior	
	1938–1979	Flag of the Minister of Justice	

=== Provincial flags ===
Flag	Date	Use	Description
	1942 — 1980s	Chiang Mai Province	
	1987	Chiang Mai Province	
	1942 — c. 1950s	Krabi Province	Yellow flag, with a red square at the upper left corner containing two crossed white swords. Below the swords, there is a text banner that reads "จังหวัดกระบี่" (Krabi Province).
	c. 1950s — c. 1980s	Krabi Province	A plain yellow rectangular flag with the provincial emblem of Krabi in the center.
	1942 — c. 1997	Chanthaburi Province	A red flag with the provincial emblem in a blue square at the hoist side. The emblem features a rabbit in the moon emitting light.
	Unknown — 2008	Chachoengsao Province	A rectangular crimson flag with the old provincial emblem in the center, depicting the ubosot of Wat Sothonwararam surrounded by Kanok patterns.
	Unknown — 2008	Chachoengsao Province	The crimson background represents sacrifice and unity from the struggles and victories of Naresuan during the Ayutthaya Kingdom and King Taksin the Great over enemies on land and water. The yellow signifies the royal color of King Bhumibol Adulyadej the Great. The floating pavilion symbolizes abundance, moisture, coolness, and the revered Luang Pho Phra Phutthasothon who floated down the Bang Pakong River.
	1942–1950s	Chumphon Province	
	c. 1950s — 1971	Thonburi Province	Dark blue flag with two yellow stripes. In the center is the provincial emblem featuring Wat Arun Ratchawararam Ratchawaramahawihan.
	1942 — c. 1950s	Khon Kaen Province	
	1942 — c. 1977	Lampang Province	
	c. 1970s	Lampang Province	
	1942 — c. 1950s	Lamphun Province	Sky blue rectangular flag with a white border. In the center is Phra That Hariphunchai, with the text "จังหวัดลำพูน" (Lamphun Province) below.
	1960s	Lamphun Province	Pink rectangular flag with a white border. In the center is Phra That Hariphunchai, with the text "จังหวัดลำพูน" (Lamphun Province) below.
	Unknown	Loei Province	
	Unknown	Lopburi Province	
	1942 — c. 1980s	Mae Hong Son Province	
	1950s	Nakhon Nayok Province	Rectangular flag divided into three horizontal stripes of light green, dark green, and light green. In the center is the provincial emblem depicting an elephant raising a rice stalk, with haystacks in the background.
	1942 — c. 1950s	Nakhon Phanom Province	Flag with two horizontal stripes of red and pink. The hoist side has a vertical brown stripe, featuring Phra That Phanom.
	1960s — 1980s	Nakhon Phanom Province	Flag with two horizontal stripes of orange and brown. In the center is the provincial emblem depicting Phra That Phanom diagonally.
	1942 — c. 1950s	Nakhon Pathom Province	Blue flag with Phra Pathom Chedi in the center, accompanied by the provincial name.
	1942 — c. 1950s	Nakhon Ratchasima Province	
	1942 — c. 1950s	Nakhon Sawan Province	Blue rectangular flag with an image of a three-tiered pavilion in the center, accompanied by the provincial name.
	c. 1950s — c. 1990s	Nakhon Sawan Province	Rectangular flag divided into three horizontal stripes of blue, light blue, and blue. In the center is an image of a three-tiered pavilion with the text "จังหวัดนครสวรรค์" (Nakhon Sawan Province).
	c. 1990s — c. 2000	Nakhon Sawan Province	Light blue rectangular flag with an image of a three-tiered pavilion in the center, with the text "จังหวัดนครสวรรค์" (Nakhon Sawan Province) in green.
	1957 — Unknown	Nan Province	
	1942 — 1969	Narathiwat Province	The hoist side is a yellow square containing the provincial emblem depicting a curved kriss blade and a Naga stretched on the ground. The rest of the flag consists of 7 horizontal stripes, 4 red and 3 white.
	1969 — 1977	Narathiwat Province	
	1942 — c. 1980s	Nong Khai Province	
	1942 — c. 1950s	Nonthaburi Province	Dark blue - blue flag divided vertically in half, with a decorative clay pot in the center accompanied by the provincial name.
	c. 1950s — 1966	Nonthaburi Province	Dark blue - blue flag divided vertically in half, with the provincial emblem depicting a decorative clay pot in the center.
	1966 — c. 1980s	Nonthaburi Province	Purple - blue flag divided vertically in half, with the provincial emblem depicting a decorative clay pot in the center.
	1942 — c. 1960s	Pattani Province	Yellow rectangular flag with small green stripes along the top and bottom edges. In the center is Phraya Tani Cannon, accompanied by the provincial name.
	c. 1960s — Before 1985	Pattani Province	Green flag with yellow borders on three sides, excluding the hoist side. In the center is Phraya Tani Cannon, accompanied by the provincial name.
	1942 — 2004	Phang Nga Province	Blue-yellow-pink flag divided vertically, with the old provincial emblem in the center, featuring only a mining dredge and Khao Chang.
	Unknown	Phatthalung Province	
	1942 — c. 1950s	Phrae Province	Vertical bi-color flag of purplish-pink and blue. In the center is Phra That Cho Hae on horseback, accompanied by the provincial name.
	c. 1950s — 2023	Phrae Province	Rectangular flag divided vertically in half. The hoist side is green, and the fly side is red. In the center is a blue circle, with the upper half depicting Wat Phra That Cho Hae Royal Temple and the lower half having the text "จังหวัดแพร่" (Phrae Province) in a curved semicircle.
	c. 1950s — 1971	Phra Nakhon Province	Dark blue flag with two red stripes. In the center is the provincial emblem featuring Chakri Maha Prasat Throne Hall.
	1942 — c. 1950s	Phuket Province	
	c. 1950s — 1985	Phuket Province	Blue flag with the old provincial emblem in the center, depicting Thao Thep Krasattri and Thao Si Sunthon with Thalang Island in the background.
	Unknown — 2004	Roi Et Province	Yellow flag with the provincial emblem of Roi Et in the center, depicting an island in Bueng Phlan Chai. In the center of the island is a pavilion housing a Constitution Pedestal. The lower part of the emblem has Kanok patterns.
	1942 — 1950s	Prachuap Khiri Khan Province	
	1942 — c. 1960s	Ranong Province	
	1942 — 1966	Ratchaburi Province	Flag with three horizontal stripes of white-blue-white. In the center is the provincial emblem depicting Khao Ngu (Snake Mountain).
	1942 — 1980s	Rayong Province	
	1950s — c. 1985	Sisaket Province	
	1957 — Unknown	Samut Prakan Province	
	Unknown	Saraburi Province	
	Unknown — 2021	Saraburi Province	
	Unknown — 2004	Sing Buri Province	Red flag with the old provincial emblem of Sing Buri in the center, depicting a stockade wall and battlements, referring to the Bang Rachan Camp.
	1942 — c. 1969	Sisaket Province	
	1942 — c. 1950s	Songkhla Province	
	c. 1950s — Before 1987	Songkhla Province	
	Unknown	Suphan Buri Province	
	1957 — Unknown	Surat Thani Province	
	1950s — Unknown	Tak Province	
	c. 1950s — c. 1970s	Trang Province	A plain blue rectangular flag with the provincial emblem in the center, depicting a lighthouse, national flag, port, and waves in the sea.
	c. 1960s — c. 1980s	Ubon Ratchathani Province	Rectangular flag with orange-pink-orange stripes. In the center of the pink stripe is the provincial emblem of Ubon Ratchathani, depicting both a closed and blooming lotus flower on a stem with leaves. Below, there is a Garuda and a ribbon containing the text "จังหวัดอุบลราชธานี" (Ubon Ratchathani Province). All of this is enclosed in a circular frame.
	1942 — 1960s	Udon Thani Province	Flag with two horizontal stripes of brown and orange. In the center is the image of Thao Wessuwan, accompanied by the provincial name.
	1942 — c. 1950s	Ang Thong Province	Flag with two horizontal stripes of blue and yellow. In the center is an image of a golden bowl (Ang Thong) and rice stalks.
	c. 1950s — 1990s	Ang Thong Province	Flag with two horizontal stripes of blue and yellow. In the center is the provincial emblem depicting a golden bowl (Ang Thong) and rice stalks.
	2000s — 2010s	Ang Thong Province	Flag with two horizontal stripes of green and yellow. In the center is the provincial emblem depicting a golden bowl (Ang Thong) and rice stalks.
	1942 — c. 1980s	Uthai Thani Province	Red-blue flag with a white stripe. In the center is the provincial emblem depicting Khao Pathawi emitting sunlight.
	1942 — c. 1950s	Uttaradit Province	Orange rectangular flag with a purple cross shifted towards the hoist side. In the center of the cross is an image of Phra Thaen Sila At, accompanied by the provincial name.

== See also ==
- Royal Flags of Thailand
- Royal Standard of Thailand
- List of Military flags of Thailand
- Seals of The Provinces of Thailand
