= Coronation of Vajiralongkorn =

2019 coronation in Thailand

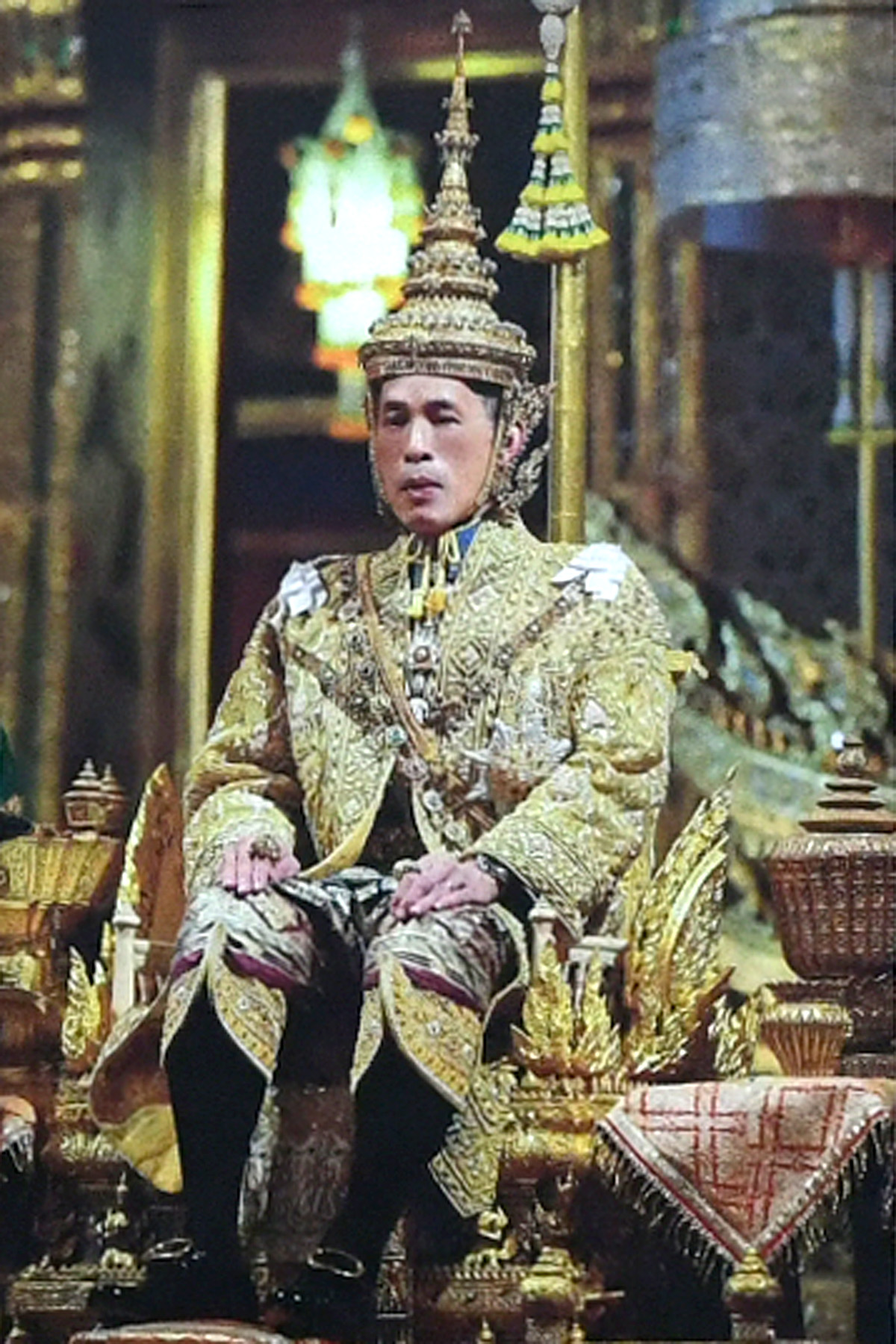
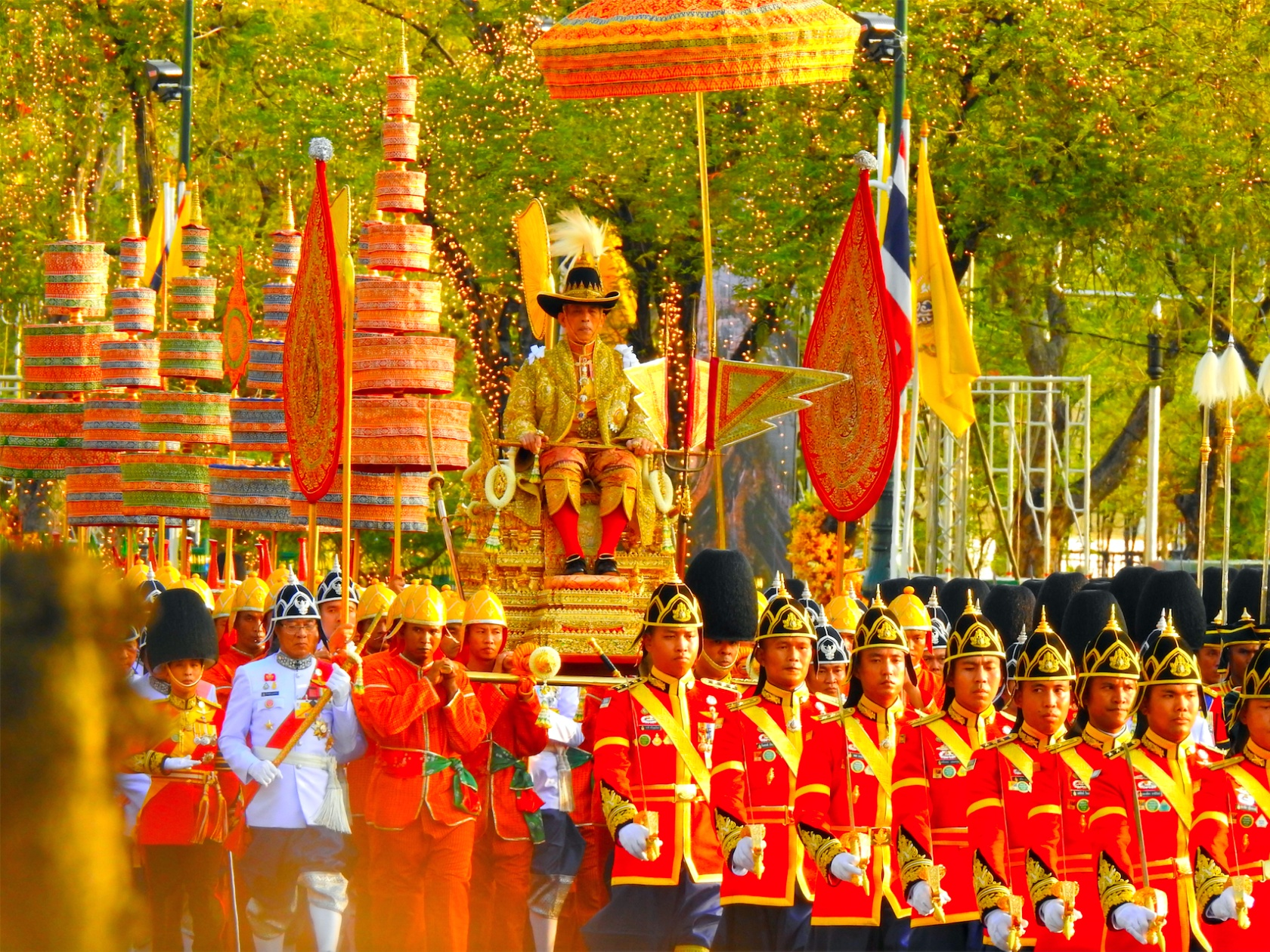
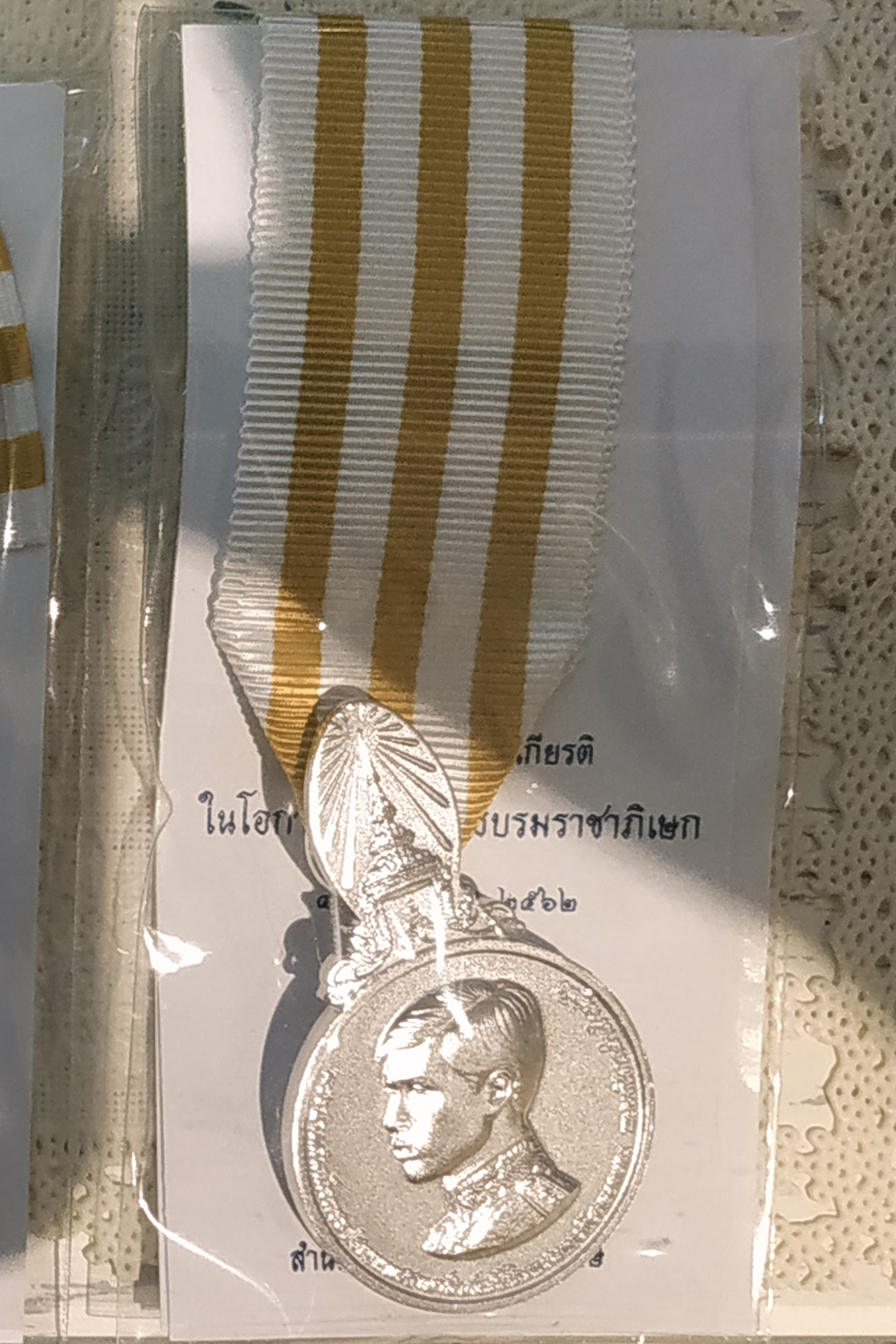
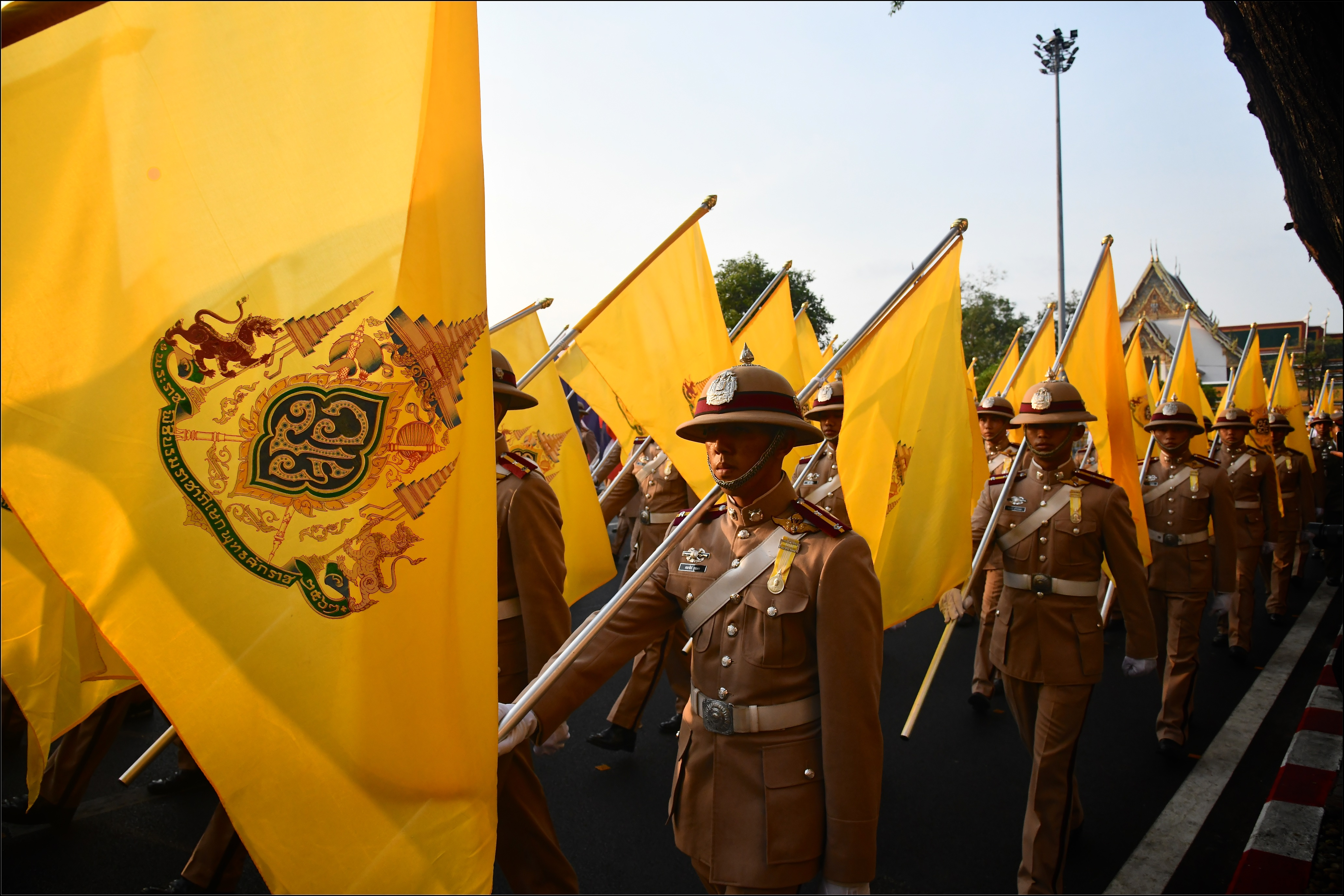
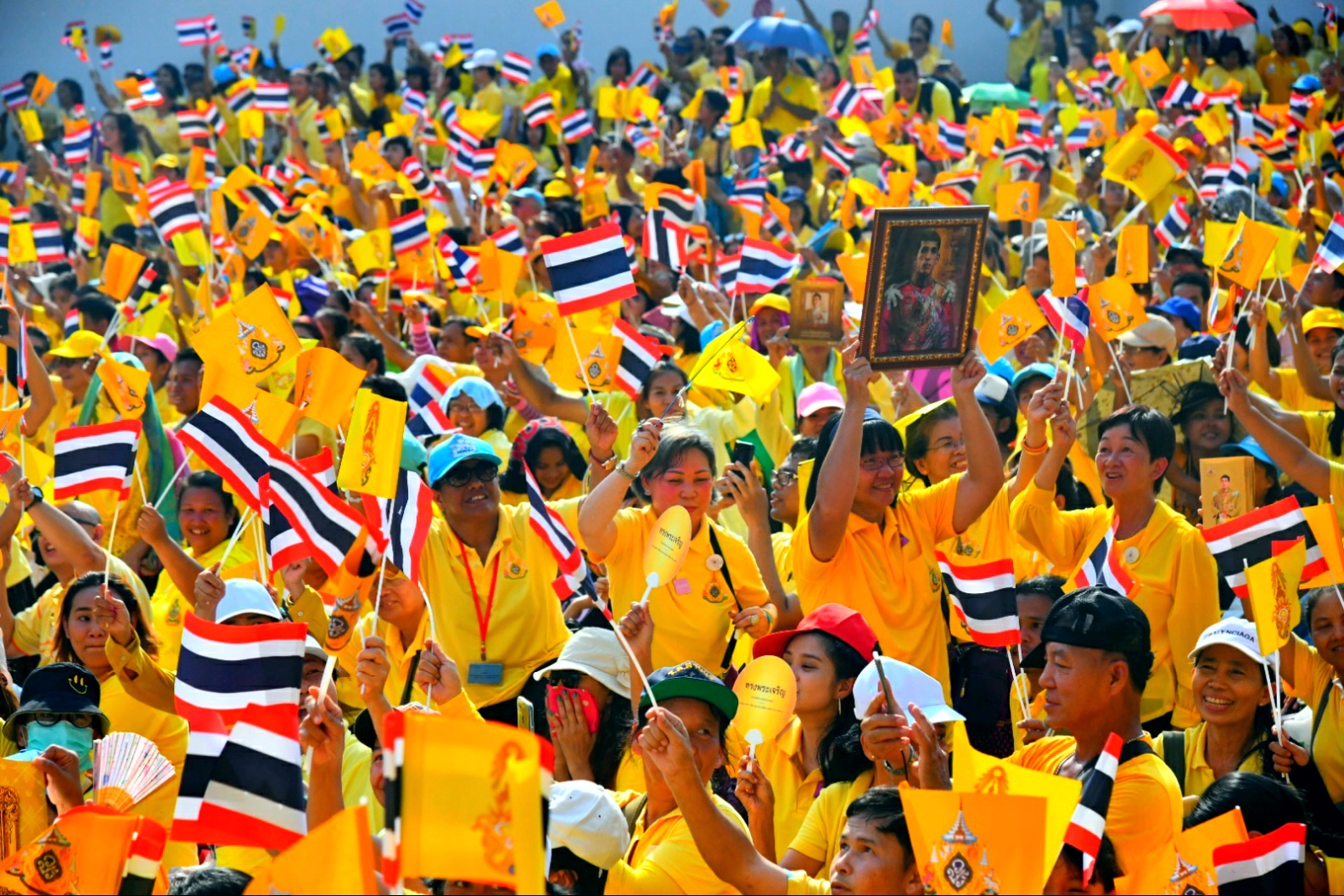
- From top, left to right: King Maha Vajiralongkorn in the Royal great audience, Royal land procession, Rama X Coronation Medal, police officers with coronation flags, people in the Royal public audience
- Date: 4 May 2019
- Venue: Grand Palace
- Location: Bangkok, Thailand
- Participants: Vajiralongkorn; Royal Family; Privy Council

The coronation of Vajiralongkorn (Rama X) as king of Thailand took place on 4 May 2019 at the Grand Palace, Bangkok. He ascended the throne at the age of 64 upon the death of his father, Bhumibol Adulyadej, on 13 October 2016, accepting the accession invitation by Prem Tinsulanonda, president of the Privy Council, on 1 December 2016. The coronation was held within just three years after his accession to the throne in 2016 because of an appropriate length of time to pass after the death and funeral of Bhumibol Adulyadej and the arrangement of the ceremony after the last such rite having been held in 1950.

The ceremonies of coronation, the first ever to be aired on television, were aired in both Thai and English by the Television Pool of Thailand. In an historic move, the broadcasts were also aired online through the Youtube and Facebook channels of Thai PBS and NBT English, the first livestreamed coronation in Thai history that enabled millions around the world to watch the ceremonies live regardless of location.

== Coronation arrangement ==
=== 6 April ===
The collection of water for use the ceremony took place on 6 April 2019, Chakri Day, in all 76 provinces and Bangkok. This event formally marked the official commencement of the preparatory activities to be held before the coronation day.

==== List of sacred water sources ====
Name	Thai name	District	Province
Phuttha Utthayan Reservoir	อ่างเก็บน้ำพุทธอุทยาน	Mueang Amnat Charoen	Amnat Charoen
Chao Phraya River, Wat Chaiyo Worawihan	แม่น้ำเจ้าพระยา, วัดไชโยวรวิหาร	Chaiyo	Ang Thong
Bueng Khong Long Wetland	พื้นที่ชุ่มน้ำบึงโขงหลง	Bueng Khong Long	Bueng Kan
Sacred Well, Tham Phra Cave	บ่อน้ำศักดิ์สิทธิ์ถ้ำพระ	Seka	Bueng Kan
Sacred Pond, Wat Klang	แหล่งน้ำศักดิ์สิทธิ์วัดกลาง	Mueang Buriram	Buriram
Paknam Jolo	ปากน้ำโจ้โล้	Bang Khla	Chachoengsao
Chao Phraya River, Wat Thammamun Worawihan	แม่น้ำเจ้าพระยา, วัดธรรมามูลวรวิหาร	Mueang Chai Nat	Chai Nat
Sacred Well, Wat Pairee Pinat	บ่อน้ำศักดิ์สิทธิ์วัดไพรีพินาศ	Mueang Chaiyaphum	Chaiyaphum
Bo Nam Chi Phut Well, Chi River	บ่อน้ำชีผุด แม่น้ำชี	Nong Bua Daeng	Chaiyaphum
Sacred Well, Wat Plup	บ่อน้ำชีผุด แม่น้ำชี	Mueang Chanthaburi	Chanthaburi
Narayana Stream	ธารนารายณ์	Mueang Chanthaburi	Chanthaburi
Sa Kaeo Pond	สระแก้ว	Tha Mai	Chanthaburi
Sacred Well, Wat Bupparam	บ่อน้ำศักดิ์สิทธิ์ วัดบุพพาราม	Mueang Chiang Mai	Chiang Mai
Ang Ka Luang	อ่างกาหลวง	Chom Thong	Chiang Mai
Khun Nam Mae Ping	ขุนน้ำแม่ปิง	Chiang Dao	Chiang Mai
Bo Nam Thip Well, Wat Phra That Doi Tung	บ่อน้ำทิพย์, วัดพระมหาชินธาตุเจ้า (ดอยตุง)	Mae Sai	Chiang Rai
Chao Khun Thao Pond, Wat Khao Phra Phutthabat Bang Sai	สระเจ้าคุณเฒ่า, วัดเขาพระพุทธบาท บางทราย	Mueang Chonburi	Chonburi
Bo Nam Thip Well, Tham Khao Plu Cave	บ่อน้ำทิพย์, ถ้ำเขาพลู	Pathio	Chumphon
Kud Nam Kin	กุดน้ำกิน	Mueang Kalasin	Kalasin
Bo Samsaen Well	บ่อสามแสน	Mueang Kamphaeng Phet	Kamphaeng Phet
Samprasob River	แม่น้ำสามประสบ	Sangkhla Buri	Kanchanaburi
Baray, Wat Ku Prapha Chai	บาราย วัดกู่ประภาชัย	Nam Phong	Khon Kaen
Wang Tewada	วังเทวดา	Mueang Krabi	Krabi
Bo Camadevi Well	บ่อน้ำเลี้ยงพระนางจามเทวี	Mueang Lampang	Lampang
Bo Nam Thip Well, Doi Khamo	บ่อน้ำทิพย์ ดอยขะม้อ	Mueang Lamphun	Lamphun
Tham Piang Din Cave	ถ้ำเพียงดิน	Mueang Loei	Loei
Sacred Well, Wat Kawi Sararam Ratcha Worawihan	บ่อน้ำศักดิ์สิทธิ์ วัดกวิศรารามราชวรวิหาร	Mueang Lopburi	Lopburi
Tham Pla–Namtok Pha Suea National Park	อุทยานแห่งชาติถ้ำปลา–น้ำตกผาเสื่อ	Mueang Mae Hong Son	Mae Hong Son
Nong Nam Dun Swamp	หนองดูน	Na Dun	Maha Sarakham
Khamcha-i Waterfall	น้ำตกศักดิ์สิทธิ์คำชะอี	Khamcha-i	Mukdahan
Khun Dan Prakarnchon Dam	เขื่อนขุนด่านปราการชล	Mueang Nakhon Nayok	Nakhon Nayok
Muang Boran Dong Lakhon City	เมืองโบราณดงละคร	Mueang Nakhon Nayok	Nakhon Nayok
Bueng Phra Achan Swamp	บึงพระอาจารย์	Mueang Nakhon Nayok	Nakhon Nayok
Chandra Pond, Sanam Chandra Palace	สระน้ำจันทร์ พระราชวังสนามจันทร์	Mueang Nakhon Pathom	Nakhon Pathom
Sa Murathapisek Pond	สระน้ำมุรธาภิเษก	That Phanom	Nakhon Phanom
Lam Takong Water Source, Khao Yai National Park	ต้นน้ำลำตะคอง อุทยานแห่งชาติเขาใหญ่	Pak Chong	Nakhon Ratchasima
Bueng Boraphet	บึงบอระเพ็ด	Mueang Nakhon Sawan	Nakhon Sawan
Sacred Well, Wat Na Phra Lan	บ่อน้ำศักดิ์สิทธิ์ วัดหน้าพระลาน	Mueang Nakhon Si Thammarat	Nakhon Si Thammarat
Sacred Well, Wat Sema Mueang	บ่อน้ำศักดิ์สิทธิ์ วัดเสมาเมือง	Mueang Nakhon Si Thammarat	Nakhon Si Thammarat
Sacred Well, Wat Samao Chai	บ่อน้ำศักดิ์สิทธิ์ วัดเสมาไชย	Mueang Nakhon Si Thammarat	Nakhon Si Thammarat
Sacred Well, Wat Pratu Khao	บ่อน้ำศักดิ์สิทธิ์ วัดประตูขาว	Mueang Nakhon Si Thammarat	Nakhon Si Thammarat
Sacred Well, Huai Khao Mahachai	บ่อน้ำศักดิ์สิทธิ์ ห้วยเขามหาชัย	Mueang Nakhon Si Thammarat	Nakhon Si Thammarat
Sacred Well, Huai Pak Nakkharat	บ่อน้ำศักดิ์สิทธิ์ ห้วยปากนาคราช	Lan Saka	Nakhon Si Thammarat
Bo Nam Thip Well, Wat Suan Tan	บ่อน้ำทิพย์ วัดสวนตาล	Mueang Nan	Nan
Khlong Nam Bang Canal	คลองน้ำแบ่ง	Su-ngai Padi	Narathiwat
Sacred Well, Wat Si Khun Muang	บ่อน้ำศักดิ์สิทธิ์ วัดศรีคูณเมือง	Mueang Nong Bua Lamphu	Nong Bua Lamphu
Sa Mucalinda Pond	สระมุจลินท์	Mueang Nong Khai	Nong Khai
Chao Phraya River, The Monument of King Nangklao (Rama III), Wat Chaloem Phra Kiat Worawihan	แม่น้ำเจ้าพระยา เบื้องหน้าพระบรมราชานุสาวรีย์พระบาทสมเด็จพระนั่งเกล้าเจ้าอยู่หัว วัดเฉลิมพระเกียรติวรวิหาร	Mueang Nonthaburi	Nonthaburi
Chao Phraya River, Wat San Chao	แม่น้ำเจ้าพระยา บริเวณหน้าวัดศาลเจ้า	Mueang Pathum Thani	Pathum Thani
Sa Wang Plai Bua Pond	สระวังพรายบัว	Nong Chik	Pattani
Bo Thong Well	บ่อทอง	Nong Chik	Pattani
Bo Chai Well	บ่อไชย	Nong Chik	Pattani
Bo Reu Si Well	บ่อฤษี	Nong Chik	Pattani
Sacred Well, Tham Nam Phud Cave	บ่อน้ำศักดิ์สิทธิ์ ถ้ำน้ำผุด	Mueang Phang Nga	Phang Nga
Chai Buri Cave	ถ้ำน้ำบนหุบเขาชัยบุรี	Mueang Phatthalung	Phatthalung
Sacred Pond, Wat Don Sala	สระน้ำศักดิ์สิทธิ์ วัดดอนศาลา	Ban Lat	Phatthalung
Sacred Well, Phra Bharomathat Khean Bang Kaew	บ่อน้ำศักดิ์สิทธิ์ พระบรมธาตุเขียนบางแก้ว	Khao Chaison	Phatthalung
Wat Tha Chaisiri	วัดท่าไชยศิริ	Ban Lat	Phetchaburi

=== 8 to 9 April ===
Buddhist monks in major temples consecrated the water collected in their respective provinces.

=== 10 to 11 April ===
The collected waters from the provincial temples were officially transported to the Ministry of Interior Building in Bangkok by their respective provincial governors or their representatives.

=== 12 April ===
At 13:00 (UTC+07:00), the Bangkok Metropolitan Administration transferred the holy water obtained from The Sattrakhom Hall in the Grand Palace to the Ministry of Interior Building.

=== 18 April ===
At 17:19 (UTC+07:00), all the holy water was taken in a procession from the Ministry of Interior Building to Wat Suthat for another consecration.

=== 19 April ===
At 7:30 (UTC+07:00), the holy water was taken in a procession to Wat Phra Kaew, where it was kept until coronation day.

=== 22 April ===
At 16:00 (UTC+07:00), ten monks who are abbots from several Thai Buddhist temples chanted prayers at Wat Phra Kaew to bless the ceremony and the Royal Plaques.

=== 23 April ===
At 9:25 (UTC+07:00), A ceremony was held at the ubosot of Wat Phra Kaew to record the king's horoscope and the official titles of the king and his family on the Royal Golden Plaques and to engrave the Royal Seal of State. Following the ceremony the Court Brahmins of the Devasathan Temple, led by the Chief Brahmin of the Royal Family of Thailand, blessed the plaques and the Seal.

The Royal Horoscope was engraved by the court astrologer Chatchai Pinngern, who was present during the ceremony.

=== 29 April ===
Tree plantings of yellow star trees, considered royal trees by the king, were conducted nationwide in every forest and national park in all 76 provinces.

=== 1 May ===
In a ceremony at the Amphorn Sathan Residential Hall the king officially married Gen Suthida Tidjai and officially designated her as Queen of Thailand. The ceremony was held with Princess Sirindhorn, the Princess Royal, and the President of Privy Council Prem Tinsulanonda as witnesses.

== Royal coronation ==
=== 2 May ===
At 16:09 (UTC+07:00), the King, Queen Suthida and Princess Bajrakitiyabha paid homage to the Equestrian statue of King Chulalongkorn and the Memorial of Rama I . He also paid respect to sacred icons placed at both the Phaisan Thaksin Throne Hall and Chakraphat Phimarn Royal Residence.

Nationwide, mass Buddhist monastic ordinations in honor of the coronation were organized by the National Office of Buddhism and the Sangha Supreme Council (Mahāthera Samāgama) in all 76 provinces together with their respective provincial and local governments, with 6,810 receiving their holy orders of monkhood, including personnel of the civil services, the armed forces and police.

=== 3 May ===
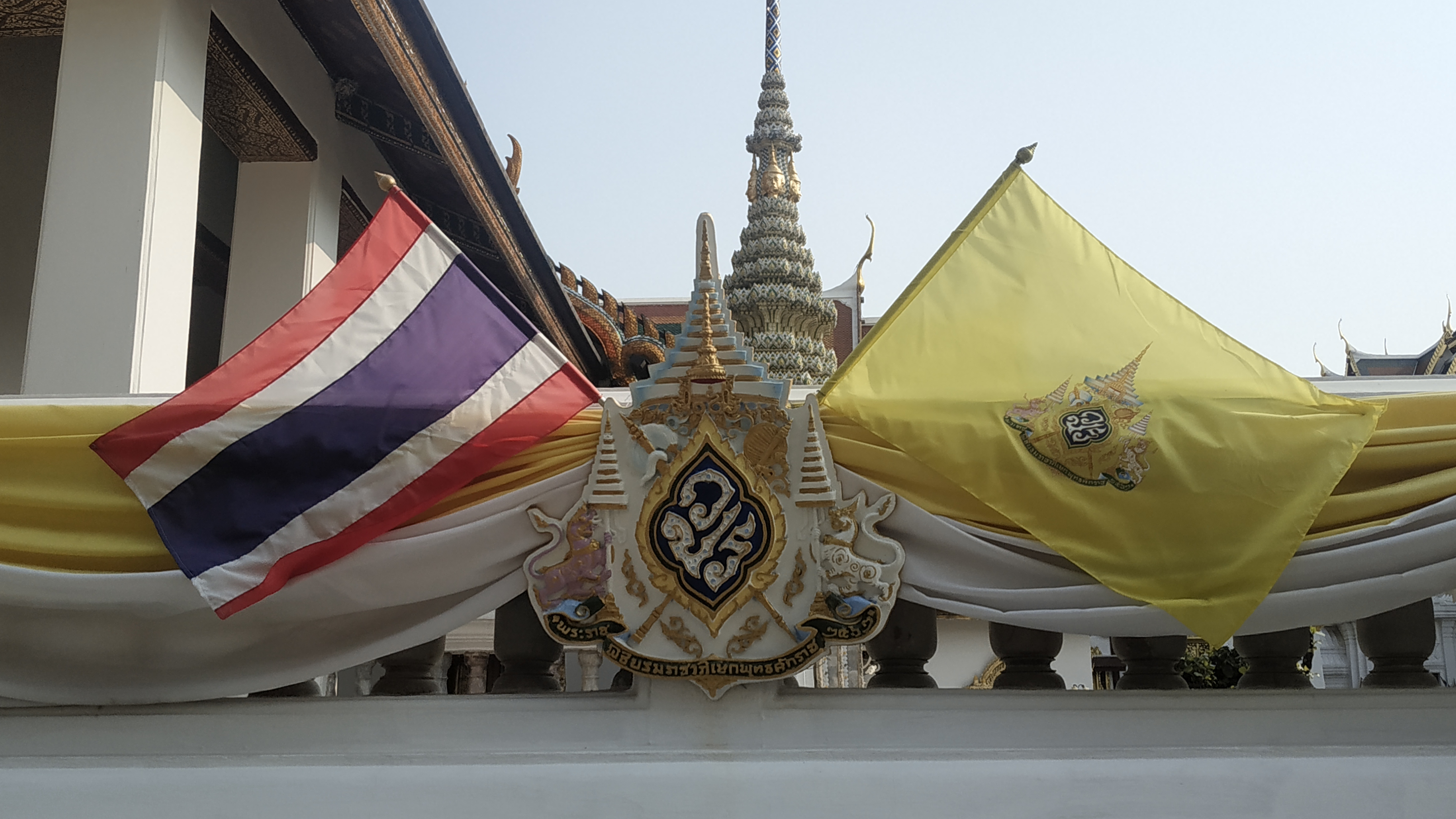
Flag and emblem of the coronation ceremony of King Vajiralongkorn.

At 10:00 (UTC+07:00), The Royal Golden Plaques and the Royal Seal of State were transferred from Wat Phra Kaew to Phaisan Thaksin Throne Hall (Phra Thinang Phaisan Thaksin) in procession, and they were placed into the hall by the Lord Chamberlain of the Chakri dynasty, Air Chief Marshal (ret) Satitpong Sukvimol, RTAF. The Weapons of Sovereignty were earlier transferred from the Temple to a special table in the hall.

In the late afternoon, Buddhist monks assembled for the benediction vigil chanted the traditional Paritta Suttas for the coronation and laid a protective thread around the buildings of the Phra Maha Monthien group within the wider Grand Palace complex as a precaution against evil spirits, preceded by a candle lighting ceremony and then, following the recitation of the Five precepts, by the lighting by Supreme Patriarch Ariyavongsagatanana (Amborn Ambaro) in the Amarin Winitchai Throne Hall (Phra Thinang Amarin Winitchai Mahaisuraya Phiman) of the Victory Candle (Candle of Victory, เทียนชัย) in the presence of the king, signifying the official commencement of the ceremony.

Following this, a senior monk formally declared the official commencement of the coronation ceremonies in both Pali and Thai (the sacred languages of the Buddhist religion in Thailand). 35 monks were stationed at the Phaisan Thaksin Throne Hall, where the soon to be crowned King was present as the presider of the vigil service, with another 5 being assigned to the Chakraphat Phimarn Royal Residence (Phra Thinang Chakraphat Phiman).

After the chanting the Chief Brahmin gave the King the leaves of certain trees, such as the Aegle marmelos, that were esteemed in ancient times for their supposed medicinal and purifying values, which, following being dipped in holy water, were brushed by him on the head and hair to symbolise purification and gave them back later to the Chief Brahmin before being burned. These leaves were earlier dipped by the Court Brahmin from the Devasathan Temple as part of a Hindu ceremony called the homa (sacrifices to fire).

After the monks departed, the king then gave offerings of flowers, each to the Hindu deities in Devasathan, to the sacred white royal nine-tiered umbrellas (five dotted around the various palaces), and to the images of the guardian spirits of the capital city at the city shrine, preceded by a second candle lighting rite paying respect to sacred Buddha images and guardians of the holy thrones in the palace. After this senior government officials took their places with persons of royal descent and the Court Brahmin around the Octagonal Throne where a ceremony was held to bless the throne.

Preceding the vigil, the king made a short visit to Wat Phra Kaew.

=== 4 May ===
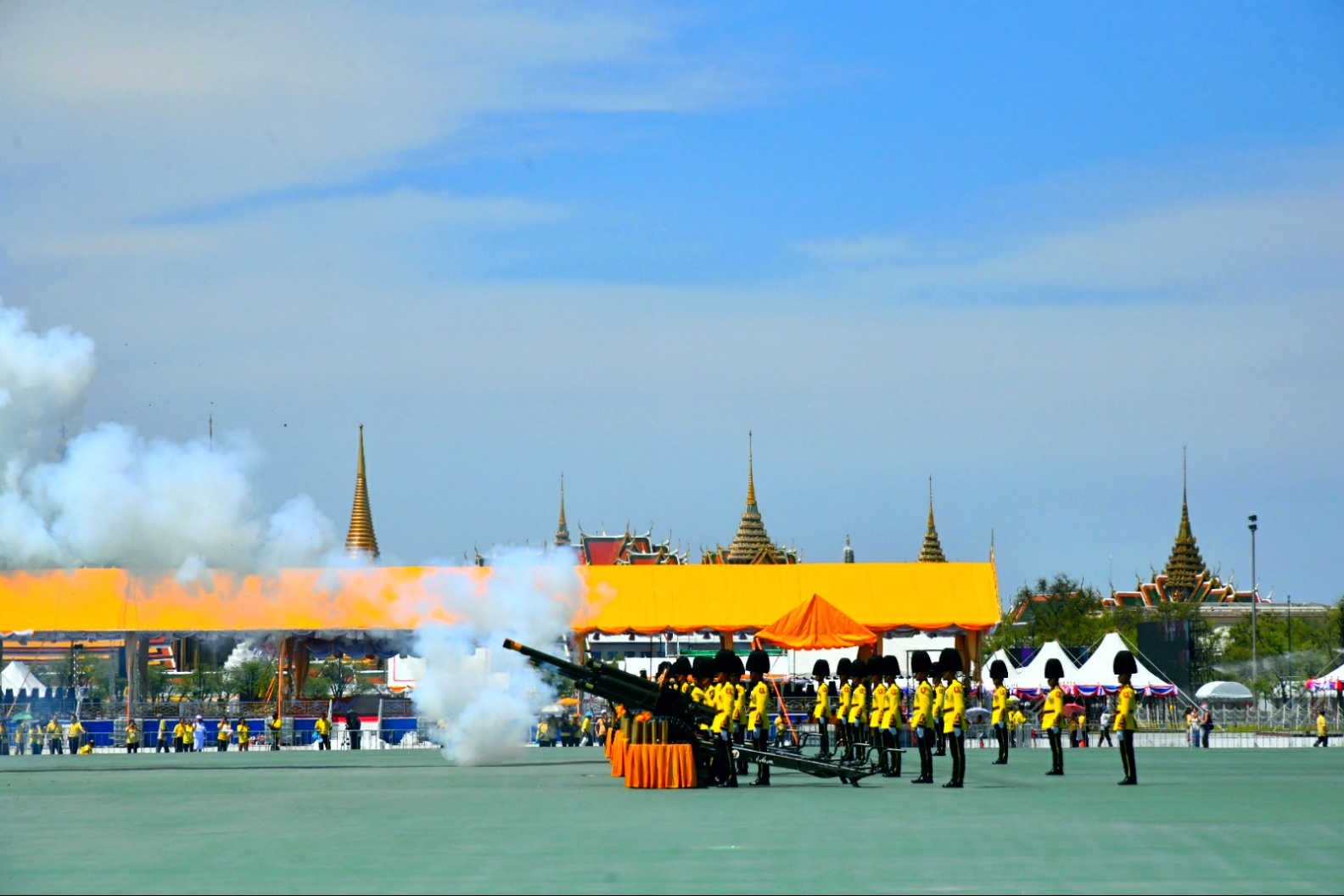
1st Battalion, 1st Field Artillery Regiment, King's Guard of the Royal Thai Army fired a 101-gun salute at Sanam Luang during the coronation ceremony.

At 10:09 (UTC+07:00), the Royal Purification, or the Song Muratha Bhisek Ceremony, took place at the Chakraphat Phimarn Royal Residence (Phra Thinang Chakraphat Phiman), in the presence of the Supreme Patriarch and the Chief Brahmin, preceded by the reading of the Five Precepts.

Shortly afterwards, King Maha Vajiralongkorn switched to a white dress trimmed with gold for purification ceremony. After making offerings and paying respects, the King sits in a specially erected pavilion. As a shower of sacred water poured upon his head, a 40-gun salute was fired and the prakhom band trumpeters sounded a fanfare. Within the precincts of the Palace, the Royal Guards played the Royal Anthem as monks recited their chants of benediction. Sacred water is also being given by the Supreme Patriarch, HSH Prince Pusan Svastivatana, HSH Prince Chulchern Yugala and the Chief Court Brahmin, Phra Maha Raja Guru Bidhi Sri Visudhigun. The King then cleansed himself with the waters collected earlier from all 76 provinces across Thailand.

The ablution rite was then followed by the Anointment Ceremony at the Phaisan Thaksin Throne Hall's Octagonal Throne, in which the King was presented with 9 bowls of consecrated water from the government officials and royal representatives who were present the previous night, representing the Thai people, the royal family and the state government, wherein he was formally granted the full authority of his kingship in accordance with the religious and historical traditions of the state and the Constitution. In each of the directions of the throne, the Chief Brahmin gave the king the bowl of water, in which he dipped his hands, and following the act the Royal Nine-Tiered Umbrella was presented to him after the Court Brahmin chanted a Hindu mantra. Only after the Royal Umbrella is presented which symbolises the full consecration of the King, the King from that point can be addressed as Phrabat Somdet Phra Chaoyuhua (Thai: พระบาทสมเด็จพระเจ้าอยู่หัว)

Then the king proceeded to the Phatharabit Throne and was seated under the Royal Nine-tiered Umbrella as the new consecrated sovereign, where, after paying homage and reciting the Tamil mantra "Opening the portals of Kailash" (from the Tiruvacakam), the Chief Brahmin presented him with the Royal Golden Plaque and other official royal regalia, during which the Royal Anthem was officially played, a fanfare sounded and a 101-gun salute from the Ceremonial Gun Battery, 1st Battalion, 1st Field Artillery Regiment, King's Guard of the Royal Thai Army fired at both the Grand Palace and the Sanam Luang Royal Plaza as similar salutes were fired in the provinces in saluting stations manned by personnel of the Royal Thai Armed Forces, while bells were rung in Buddhist temples nationwide. Distinctive blowing of conch shells were heard as the King crowned himself with the 7.3 kg Great Crown of Victory at 12:10 (UTC+7:00). After the Crowning and Investiture Ceremony, in response to the Chief Brahmin formally informing him of new royal title and the benediction that preceded it, the king presented the First Royal Command to the Court Brahmins and the Chief Brahmin of the Royal Family, in the following manner:

The King: From today, I shall continue, preserve, and build upon the royal legacy and shall reign with righteousness for the benefit and happiness of the people forever. The Chief Brahmin: Your Majesty, I do receive this the first command of yours, and will fulfill it to the best that I can do.

Following the exchange, he then poured water into a bowl as an offering to Phra Mae Thorani the goddess of earth in an ancient Hindu rite of ratification and confirmation for a good deed.

This was followed by the consecration and installation of Queen Suthida as Queen of Thailand, wherein following the proclamation of her installation he awarded her with the insignias of the Order of the Royal House of Chakri and the Order of the Nine Gems, while fanfare and music is played and a Buddhist benediction said. Following this the King scattered gold and silver flowers and coins among the Court Brahmin and members of the royal family as alms.

Minutes after the Victory Candle was extinguished at the Amarin Winitchai Throne Hall amidst the chanting of the monks in the presence of the king and queen.

At 13:19 (UTC+07:00), the ceremony of Assumption of the Royal Residence then followed at the Chakraphat Phimarn Royal Residence.

At 14:00 (UTC+07:00), The king held an audience with members of the Royal Family, the Privy Council, government officials, members of the diplomatic corps and representatives of public and private enterprises at the Phuttan Kanchanasinghat Throne inside the Amarin Winitchai Throne Hall, where he gave his first address to the nation as crowned sovereign of the people and nation of Thailand. The loyal address on behalf of members of the Royal Family was made by Princess Maha Chakri Sirindhorn, the Princess Royal, followed by the loyal address on behalf of the government, civil service, armed forces and police which will be taken by the Prime Minister of Thailand, Gen (ret) Prayut Chan-o-cha, RTA, and the Chief Justice of the Supreme Court, Judge Cheep Chulamon, and the loyal address on behalf of the people which was made by the President of the National Legislative Assembly of Thailand, Pornpetch Wichitcholchai. During the first playing of the Royal Anthem, another 21-gun salute was fired in Bangkok.

At 16:00 (UTC+07:00), the king proceeded to Wat Phra Kaew to proclaim himself the Royal Patron of Buddhism and be granted a final coronation blessing, following which, he ended the day with a sunset visit to the Dusit Maha Prasat Throne Hall to pay tribute to his royal ancestors. A short memorial service was held, wherein the new king offered orange robes to the presiding group of monks in gratitude for their presence.

==== Full order of government officials and royal representatives who gave consecrated holy water to the King at the Octagonal Throne ====
- His Serene Highness Prince Pusan Svastivatana
- His Serene Highness Prince Mongkolchalerm Yugala
- His Serene Highness Prince Chalermsuk Yugala
- Gen (ret) Prem Tinsulanonda, RTA, President of the Privy Council
- Gen (ret) Prayut Chan-o-cha, RTA, Prime Minister of Thailand
- Pornpetch Wichitcholchai, President of the National Legislative Assembly of Thailand
- Charas Suwanwela, Member of the Royal Society of Thailand
- Gen (ret) Anupong Paochinda, RTA, Minister of the Interior
- Judge Cheep Julamon, Chief Justice of the Supreme Court of Thailand

=== 5 May ===
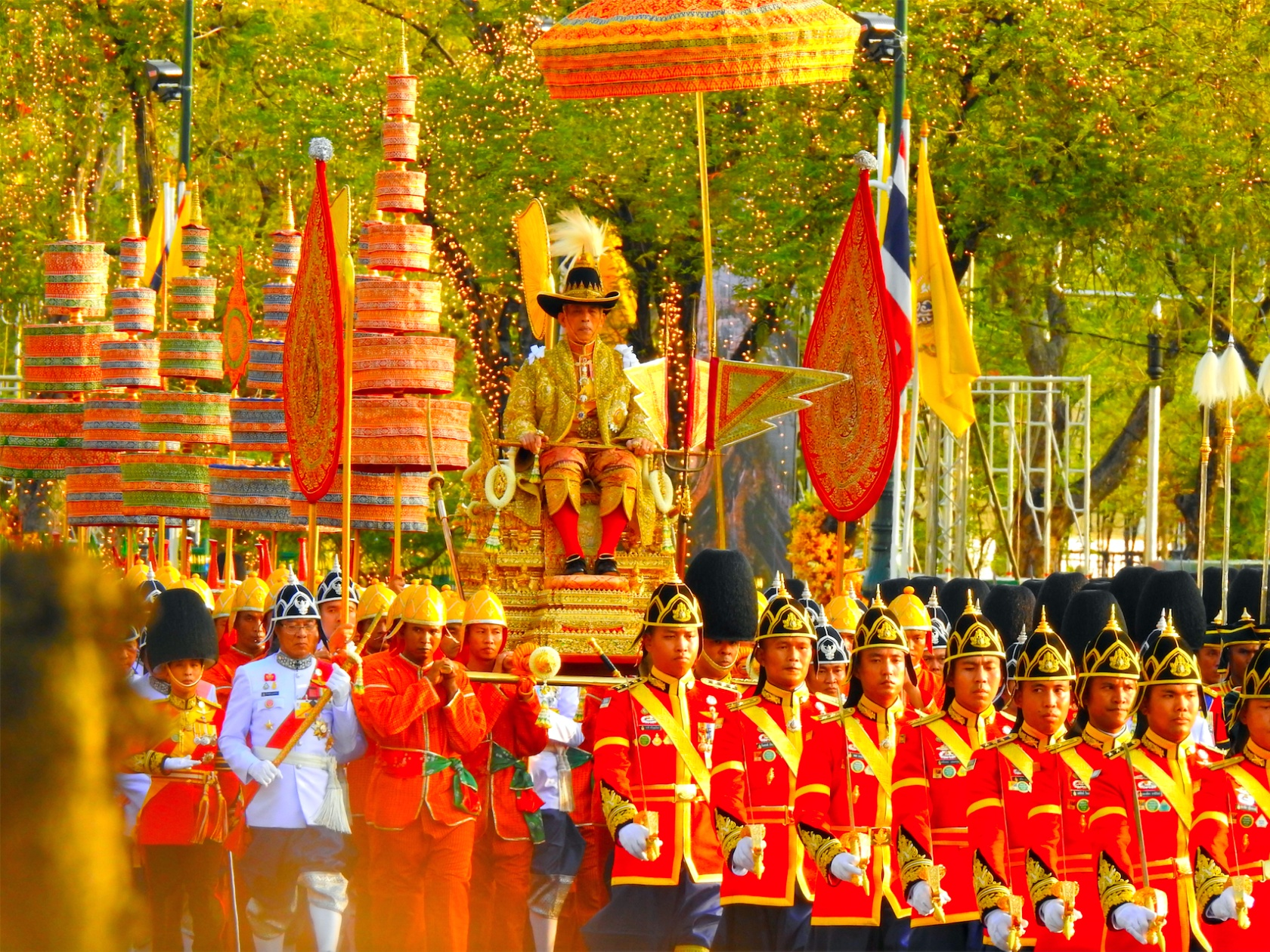
The Royal Land Procession for the coronation of Vajiralongkorn, Ratchadamnoen Nai Avenue, east side of Sanam Luang.

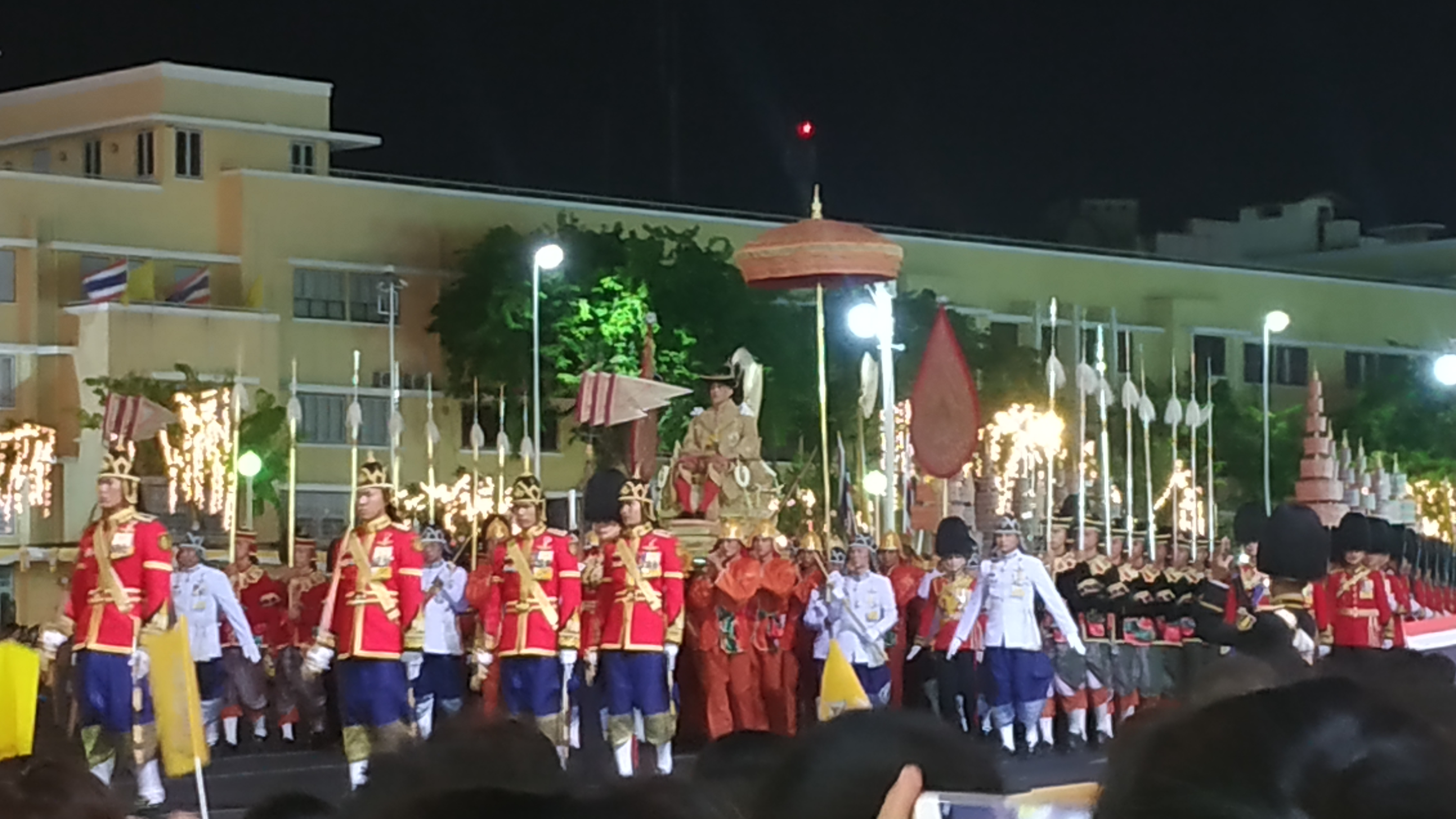
The Royal Land Procession for the coronation of Vajiralongkorn in night time, Ratchadamnoen Klang Avenue, near Democracy Monument.

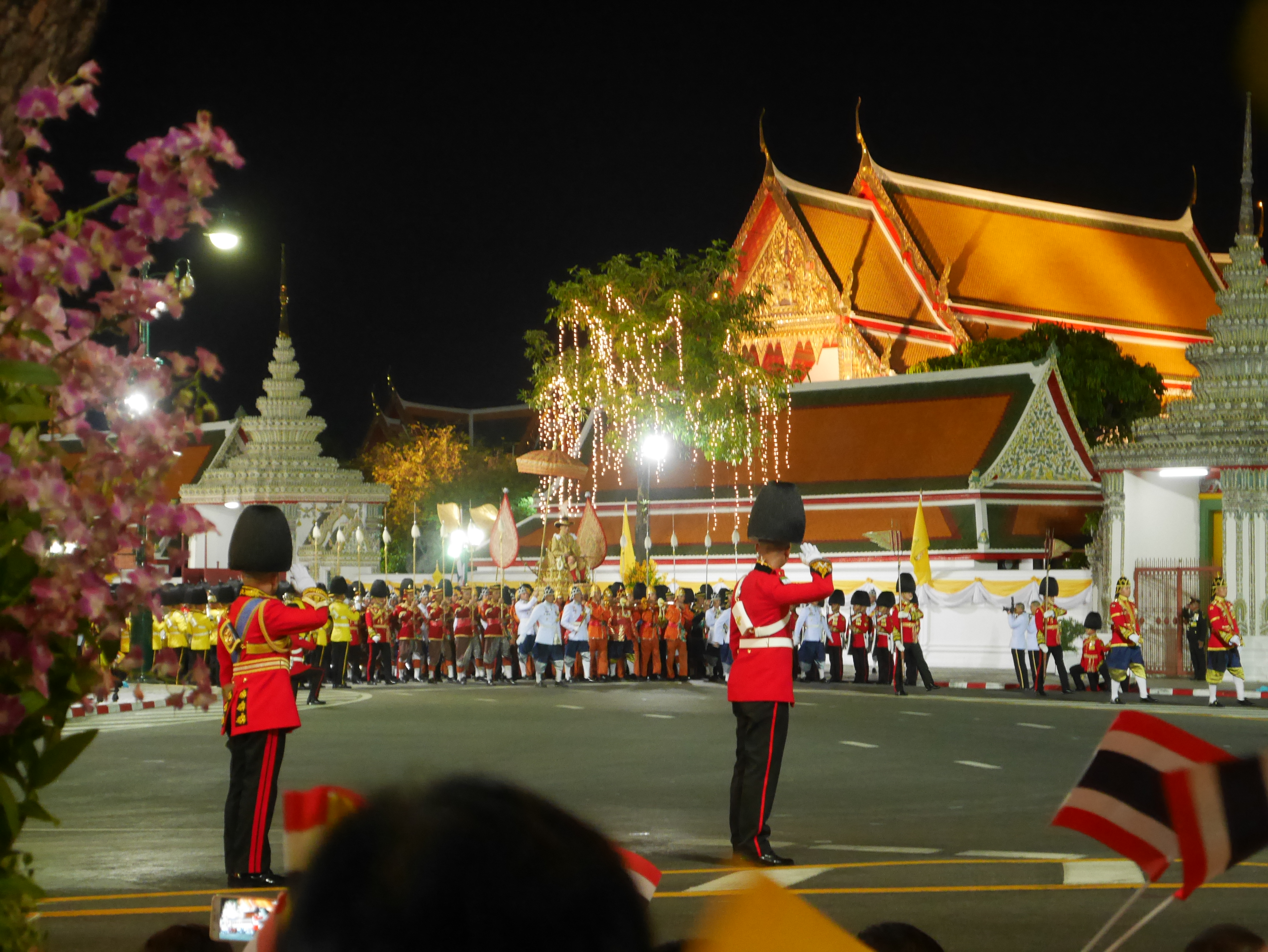
Arrival of King Vajiralongkorn at Wat Pho.

At 9:00 (UTC+07:00), the ceremony to bestow the king's Royal Cypher and Royal Title and to grant the royal ranks to members of the Royal Family and Privy Council took place at the Amarin Winitchai Throne Hall followed by a lunch service by Buddhist monks.

At 16:30 (UTC+07:00), the King rode in the Royal Palanquin in procession in the centre of the city. At each temple along the route, the king paid respects to the ashes of predecessor monarchs enshrined in these temples.

==== Full order of the Royal Land Procession through the streets of Bangkok ====
- Two cavalry troopers from the Royal Thai Police
- 1st Massed military bands of the 1st Division, King's Guard, First Army, RTA
  - Band of the 1st Battalion, 1st Infantry Regiment, King's Own Close Bodyguard
  - Band of the 2nd Battalion, 1st Infantry Regiment, King's Own Close Bodyguard
  - Regimental Band of the Chulachomklao Royal Military Academy
- Parade commander and staff
- 1st Guards Regiment
  - 1st Battalion, 1st Infantry Regiment, King's Own Close Bodyguard
- Royal Standard Bearers (carrying the War Flags of Garuda and Hanuman)
- Prakhom band from the Bureau of the Royal Household and Court Brahmins from Devasathan Temple
- Clapper
- Gen (Rtd) Prayut Chan-o-cha, RTA, the Prime Minister of Thailand, and Gen Pornpipat Benyasri, RTA, the Chief of Defence Forces, service commanders of the RTARF and the Chief of the General Staff
- 1st company of Royal umbrella bearers and the bearers of the Victory Flags of the Trimurti (Hindu Trinity)
- The Grand Royal Coronation Palanquin carrying the King, carried by 16 servicemen of the Royal Thai Army and escorted by 16 spearmen, the holders of the Weapons of Sovereignty and 48 Royal Guards
  - Delegation of the Royal Family escorting the King
    - General Queen Suthida
    - Major General Princess Bajrakitiyabha
- 2nd company of Royal umbrella bearers
- Bearers of the remainder of the Royal Regalia
- 2nd Massed military bands of the 1st Division, King's Guard, First Army, RTA
- 2nd Guards Regiment
  - 1st Battalion, 11th Infantry Regiment, King's Own Bodyguard

=== 6 May ===
Speech of King Vajiralongkorn in his public audience at Suthaisawan Prasat Pavilion Hall, 6 May 2019.

At 16:30 (UTC+07:00), the King granted a public audience on the main balcony of Suthaisawan Prasat Pavilion Hall in the Grand Palace to receive his well wishes from the people and address the nation on the prospects of his reign as sovereign of the country and people. As was during the Saturday audience, Gen (Ret) Prayut Chan-o-cha, RTA, the Prime Minister of Thailand, gave the day's loyal address in the name of the assembled crowds, members of the state government and the armed forces and police.

At 17:30 the king granted an audience at the Chakri Maha Prasat Throne Hall to members of the international diplomatic corps.

At 19:01 a special drone-flying exhibition in honor of the coronation, the final event of the day, was held at the Sanam Luang Royal Plaza with 300 drones taking part.

== After coronation ==
=== 7 May ===
A special elephant parade in honor of the recent coronation was held within the streets surrounding the Grand Palace organized by the Ayutthaya Elephant Palace and Royal Kraal Foundation, evoking memories of the Ayutthaya and Thonburi periods wherein the royal family and nobility rode elephants in the dirt roads of the old city. 11 elephants accompanied by their handlers marched on across Sanam Chai Road from the Territorial Defence Command Building to Wat Phra Kaew and vice versa. The Rice Department released five new rice varieties/cultivars in honour of the coronation, all numbered "...62" for BE2562. This is a continuation of the tradition of his ancestor, Chulalongkorn (Rama V), who founded the royal rice varieties competition.

=== 9 May ===
On this day, the king presides in his first national ceremony following his coronation as he leads the annual Royal Ploughing Ceremony at Sanam Luang Square, officially starting the traditional rice growing season in Thailand. The rice sown in this rite is sourced from the Chitralada Royal Villa grounds, where his late father lived.

=== 24 May ===
The king's first ever State Opening of the National Assembly as the newly crowned sovereign of the state will take place in Bangkok. It will be the first time the State Opening will be held there as the traditional venue, the Ananta Samakhom Throne Hall, is closed to the public.

=== 5 June ===
The company CP All - which operates the 7-Elevens in the country - led employees in planting Schoutenia glomerata subsp. peregrina and economic crop trees including Tectona grandis, Dalbergia cochinchinensis, Dalbergia latifolia, Pterocarpus macrocarpus, and bamboo along the Nong Kin Reservoir, Nong Kin Subdistrict, in the Mueang Nakhon Phanom District.

=== 28 July ===
In this first birthday as the crowned sovereign, the king will host a birthday banquet in the Grand Palace in his honor, one of many events to be staged in celebration of his birthday.

=== 12 December ===
The Royal Barge Procession, originally scheduled for October 2019, was rescheduled to 12 December 2019.

=== 18 January 2020 ===
A joint oath-taking ceremony by the Royal Thai Armed Forces and Royal Thai Police held to mark the Coronation and to coincide with the Royal Thai Armed Forces Day 2020 at Cavalry Centre of Adisorn Military Camp in Saraburi Province. This was the first time that King Maha Vajiralongkorn attends a military parade in his capacity as the Head of the Armed Forces and since his ascension to the Throne. General Gen. Pornpipat Benyasri, Chief of the Defense Force, led 6,812 military and police personnels in declaring faithful allegiance to the King.

== Royal guests ==
=== Immediate family ===
- The Queen, the King's wife and consort
  - Princess Bajrakitiyabha, the King's daughter
  - Princess Sirivannavari, the King's daughter
  - Prince Dipangkorn Rasmijoti, the King's son
- Princess Ubolratana Rajakanya, the King's sister
  - Dame Ploypailin Jensen and David Wheeler, the King's niece and her husband
    - Maximus Wheeler, the King's great-nephew
    - Leonardo Wheeler, the King's great-nephew
    - Alexandra Wheeler, the King's great-niece
  - Dame Sirikitiya Jensen, the King's niece
- The Princess Royal, the King's sister
- The Princess Srisavangavadhana, the King's sister
  - Princess Siribha Chudabhorn, the King's niece
  - Princess Aditayadorn Kitikhun, the King's niece
- The Princess Suddhanarinatha, the King's former wife (also maternal first cousin)
- Dame Dhasanawalaya Sornsongkram, the King's paternal first cousin
  - Captain Jitat Sornsongkram, the King's paternal first cousin once removed

=== Extended royal family ===
==== Descendants of King Rama IV ====
- Princess Prabhabandhu Kornkosiyakaj, the King's paternal second cousin once removed
- Princess Bandhuvarobas Svetarundra, the King's paternal second cousin once removed
- Princess Uthaikanya Bhanubandhu, the King's paternal second cousin once removed
- Prince Viangvadhana Jayankura, the King's paternal first cousin twice removed
- Princess Uthaithiang Jayankura, the King's paternal first cousin twice removed
- Prince and Princess Charuridhidej Jayankura, the King's paternal first cousin twice removed and his wife
- Prince and Princess Pusan Svastivatana, the King's paternal first cousin twice removed and his wife

==== Descendants of King Rama V ====
- Princess Bhanubandhu Yugala, widow of the King's paternal first cousin once removed
  - Prince and Princess Nawaphansa Yugala, the King's paternal second cousin and his wife
  - Princess Bhanuma and Meth Phiphitphokha, the King's paternal second cousin and her husband
- Prince and Princess Mongkolchalerm Yugala, the King's paternal second cousin and his wife
- Princess Srisavangvongse Bunjitradulya, the King's paternal second cousin
- Prince Chalermsuk Yugala, the King's paternal second cousin
- Prince and Princess Dighambara Yugala, the King's paternal second cousin and his wife
- Prince and Princess Chatrichalerm Yugala, the King's paternal second cousin and his wife
- Prince and Princess Chulcherm Yugala, the King's paternal second cousin and his wife
- Princess Nobhadol Chalermsri Yugala, the King's paternal second cousin

== See also ==
- Coronation of the Thai monarch
- Coronation of King Bhumibol Adulyadej
