= Virayudh Tishyasarin =

Thai former Royal Thai Air Force officer and aviation conservationist

- วีระยุทธ ดิษยะศริน
- Born: May 1, 1955 (age 71); Thailand
- Education: Royal Thai Air Force Academy
- Spouse(s): Chulabhorn (m. 1982; div. 1996)
- Children: Princess Siribha Chudabhorn; Princess Aditayadorn Kitikhun
- Relatives: Prayad Tishyasarin (father); Chaiyapruk Didyasarin (brother)
- Military career
- Allegiance: Thailand
- Branch: Royal Thai Air Force
- Rank: Group Captain
- Nickname: Tang
- Commands: Wing 41

Virayudh Tishyasarin (Thai: วีระยุทธ ดิษยะศริน; RTGS: Wirayut Dityasarin; born 1 May 1955) is a former Royal Thai Air Force officer and aviation conservationist. He served as president of the Royal Aeronautic Sports Association of Thailand and is chairman of the Foundation for the Conservation and Development of Thai Aircraft under Royal Patronage. He is known for his work in preserving and restoring Miss Siam, the first civil aircraft registered in Thailand. He was married to Chulabhorn, daughter of King Bhumibol Adulyadej, from 1982 until their divorce in 1996, making him a former son-in-law of the king.

== Early life and education ==
Virayudh was born on 1 May 1955. He attended Debsirin School, the Armed Forces Academies Preparatory School and the Royal Thai Air Force Academy. He later completed courses at the Royal Thai Air Force squadron commanders' school and the Air Command and Staff College. He also earned a Master of Arts in Social, Business and Political Leadership from Rangsit University.

== Royal Thai Air Force career ==
Virayudh served as a Royal Thai Air Force pilot. He was assigned to a propeller-driven fighter-attack flight unit and later served with Wing 112 in Chiang Mai. He subsequently commanded a squadron at Wing 41 in Chiang Mai, became deputy commander of the wing, and later served as its commander. He was also appointed military attaché in Washington, D.C.

After leaving active military service, Virayudh became involved in aviation preservation and air sports in Thailand.

== Aviation preservation ==
Virayudh is chairman of the Foundation for the Conservation and Development of Thai Aircraft under Royal Patronage. The foundation has worked to preserve historic aircraft and promote aviation education.

One of the foundation's major projects has been the restoration of Miss Siam, an aircraft with the early history of civil aviation in Thailand. Virayudh has been involved in preserving the aircraft and restoring it to flying condition. In 2003, he flew Miss Siam on a six-day flight retracing the route of the historic 1932 flight by pilot Luen Phongsobhon.

During the restoration project, Miss Siam was flown on commemorative flights tracing Luen's historic route. On one flight, strong winds forced Virayudh to make an emergency landing in a rice field in Saraburi Province; he escaped from the aircraft without injury.

In June 2024, the Civil Aviation Authority of Thailand presented models of Miss Siam to aviation organisations as commemorative items. At the event, Virayudh spoke about the restoration project and the difficulties involved in returning the aircraft to flying condition.

The foundation has also supported aviation education. In 2024, it lent a CASA 212-100 aircraft to Ubon Ratchathani Technical College for use in training students in aircraft maintenance.

== Air sports ==
Virayudh has been president of the Royal Aeronautic Sports Association of Thailand under Royal Patronage. The association organises air-sport competitions in Thailand, including paragliding and paramotoring events.

Under his leadership, Thailand hosted international paragliding competitions, including rounds of the Paragliding Accuracy World Cup. In 2023, Thailand hosted the first round of the competition in Nong Khai Province, with competitors from 16 countries.

In 2024, Virayudh served as manager of the Thai national paragliding team at the Paragliding Accuracy World Cup event in Lombok, Indonesia, where the Thai team won one gold and three silver medals.

In February 2026, the association hosted the fifth FAI Asian Paragliding Accuracy Championship in Nong Khai Province, with Virayudh serving as president of the association. The competition was a Category I event sanctioned by the Fédération Aéronautique Internationale (FAI).

== Family and marriage ==
Virayudh was born on 1 May 1955, the eldest son of Air Chief Marshal Prayad Tishyasarin, a former director-general of Thai Airways, and Khunying Wijitra Tishyasarin. He has two younger siblings: Parichat Tishyasarin Howatkun and Air Chief Marshal Chaiyapruk Didyasarin. His younger brother Chaiyapruk served as Commander-in-Chief of the Royal Thai Air Force from 2018 to 2019.

Virayudh married Chulabhorn, the youngest daughter of King Bhumibol Adulyadej and Queen Sirikit, on 7 January 1982 at the Grand Palace. At the time, he was serving as a Royal Thai Air Force officer. They had two daughters, Princess Siribha Chudabhorn and Princess Aditayadorn Kitikhun.

The couple divorced in 1996. Their daughters later received the titles Princess Siribha Chudabhorn and Princess Aditayadorn Kitikhun.

=== Dityasarin family name ===
"Dityasarin" is a surname bestowed by King Vajiravudh (Rama VI) on Captain To, commander of the 2nd Company, 1st Battalion, 11th Infantry Regiment (Royal Guard). It appears as the 1,389th entry in the Register of Surnames Bestowed by Us, where it is spelled "Dityasarin" and romanized as "Tishyasarin". However, the 17th Royal Grant of Surnames announcement, dated 6 June 1914, spells the surname "Dityasarin". This spelling has been used by the family ever since.
