= Suthida =

Queen of Thailand since 2019

- Queen Suthida in 2019

Queen consort of Thailand
- Tenure: 1 May 2019 – present
- Coronation: 4 May 2019
- Born: Suthida Tidjai; 3 June 1978 (age 48); Hat Yai, Thailand
- Spouse: Vajiralongkorn (Rama X) (m. 2019)
Names
- Suthida Bajrasudha Bimalalakshana
- House: Mahidol (by marriage)
- Dynasty: Chakri (by marriage)
- Father: Kham Tidjai
- Mother: Jangheang Tidjai
- Religion: Theravada Buddhism
- Military career
- Allegiance: Kingdom of Thailand
- Branch: Royal Thai Army; Royal Security Command
- Service years: 2010–present
- Rank: General; Admiral; Air Chief Marshal
- Commands: Special Operations Unit
- Sports career
Medal record
Sailing
Representing Thailand
SEA Games
Gold medal – first place	2025 Chonburi	Mixed keelboat SSL47

Suthida Bajrasudha Bimalalakshana (Note: Thai: สุทิดา พัชรสุธาพิมลลักษณ, RTGS: Suthida Phatcharasuthaphimonlak, pronounced [sùʔ.tʰíʔ.dāː pʰát.tɕʰa.ráʔ.sùʔ.tʰāː.pʰíʔ.mōn.lák]) (born Suthida Tidjai; (Note: Thai: สุทิดา ติดใจ) 3 June 1978) is Queen of Thailand as the fourth wife of King Vajiralongkorn. Before their marriage, she was a flight attendant. After joining the Royal Thai Armed Forces, she was promoted to King's bodyguard.

== Early life and education ==
Suthida was born on 3 June 1978 to the Tidjai family, Kham (father) and Jangheang (mother). Her nickname is Nui (นุ้ย).

She is ethnically Hokkien, coming from a Thai Chinese family. She graduated from Hatyaiwittayalai Somboonkulkanya Middle School and Assumption University with a bachelor's degree in communication arts in 2000. Suthida was formerly a flight attendant for JALways, a Japan Airlines' subsidiary, from 2000 to 2003 and later Thai Airways International in 2003 until 2008.

== Military service ==
Suthida was appointed commander of Crown Prince Vajiralongkorn's household guard, Royal Thai Armed Forces Headquarters in August 2014. In October of 2016, international media reports labeled her as the designated king's "consort", despite the palace never officially declaring their relationship.

On December 1st, 2016, she was appointed Commander of the Special Operations Unit of the Royal Security Command and promoted to the rank of general.

On June 1st, 2017, she was appointed acting commander of Royal Thai Aide-de-camp Department following the reorganization of the Royal Security Command.

On October 13th, 2017, she was named a Dame Grand Cross (First Class) of The Most Illustrious Order of Chula Chom Klao, which bestows the title Than Phu Ying (Thai: ท่านผู้หญิง). She is the first female officer to receive this honor since 2004 and the first in the reign of King Rama X.

She reached her present rank after only six years of service. She has successfully completed several military training courses.

On October 8th, 2026, Suthida flew her first solo flight in a Saab JAS 39 Gripen fighter jet, making her Thailand’s first female Gripen pilot. It was reported that the flight made Suthida the first reigning queen in the world to ever solo pilot a modern-day combat fighter jet.

== Queen consort ==
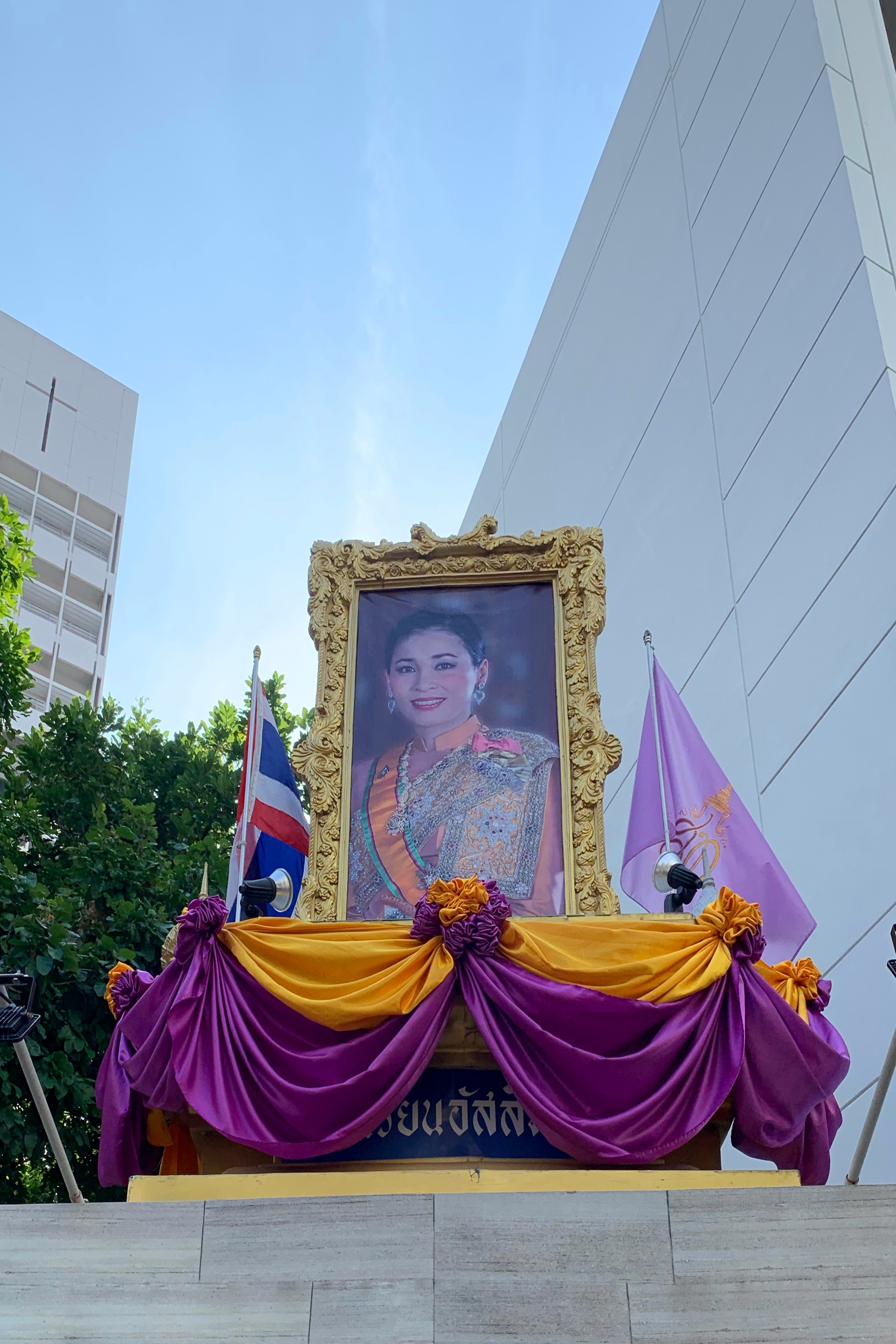
Suthida's portrait being put on display at Assumption College in Bangkok

On 1 May 2019, Suthida was made Queen of Thailand by King Vajiralongkorn, whose coronation took place in Bangkok on 4–6 May 2019. The marriage registration took place at the Amphorn Sathan Residential Hall in Bangkok, with her sister-in-law The Princess Royal Princess Maha Chakri Sirindhorn and President of Privy Council Prem Tinsulanonda as witnesses.

On 10 May 2024, King Vajiralongkorn and Queen Suthida presided over the Royal Ploughing Ceremony at Phra Meru Grounds (Sanam Luang) in Bangkok. They were accompanied by the other members of the royal family.

== Personal life ==
Queen Suthida has participated in Ice hockey and Sailing events in Thailand and has supported the sports.

During the 33rd SEA Games, in Pattaya Thailand the queen sailed as navigator on the Thai national teams SSL47 keelboat during the SEA Games. After the competition Queen Suthida appeared with King Maha Vajiralongkorn and earned a gold medal for her participation.

== Title, styles, honours and awards ==
Styles of Queen Suthida
- Reference style: Her Majesty
- Spoken style: Your Majesty

Royal monogram of Queen Suthida

Royal flag of Queen Suthida

- Since 4 May 2019: Her Majesty The Queen Suthida Bajrasudha Bimalalaksana (สมเด็จพระนางเจ้าสุทิดา พัชรสุธาพิมลลักษณ พระบรมราชินี; RTGS: Somdet Phra Nang Chao Suthida Patcharasuda Phimonlak Phra Borroma Rachini)

=== Honours ===
National

- Dame of The Most Illustrious Order of the Royal House of Chakri
- Dame of The Ancient and Auspicious Order of the Nine Gems
- Dame Grand Cross (First Class) of The Most Illustrious Order of Chula Chom Klao (13 October 2017)
- Dame Grand Cordon (Special Class) of The Most Exalted Order of the White Elephant
- Dame Grand Cordon (Special Class) of The Most Noble Order of the Crown of Thailand
- Royal Cypher Medal of King Rama IX
- Royal Cypher Medal of King Rama X
- King Vajiralongkorn's Court Medal

Foreign

- Dame Grand Cross of the National Order of Merit (France)

=== Military ranks ===
- 14 May 2010: Second Lieutenant
- 14 November 2010: First Lieutenant
- 1 April 2011: Captain
- 1 October 2011: Major
- 1 April 2012: Lieutenant Colonel
- 1 October 2012: Colonel
- 10 November 2013: Major-General
- 26 August 2016: Lieutenant-General
- 10 December 2016: General
- 6 March 2025: Admiral
- 6 March 2025: Air Chief Marshal

== Notes ==
Thai royalty
Vacant Title last held by Sirikit Kitiyakara	Queen consort of Thailand; 2019–present	Incumbent
Order of precedence
Preceded by The King	Thai order of precedence The Queen; 2nd position	Succeeded by The Princess Royal
Non-profit organization positions
Vacant Title last held by Sirikit	President of the Thai Red Cross Society; 2026–present	Incumbent
