= Siribha Chudabhorn =

Thai princess and artist

Siribha Chudabhorn; สิริภาจุฑาภรณ์
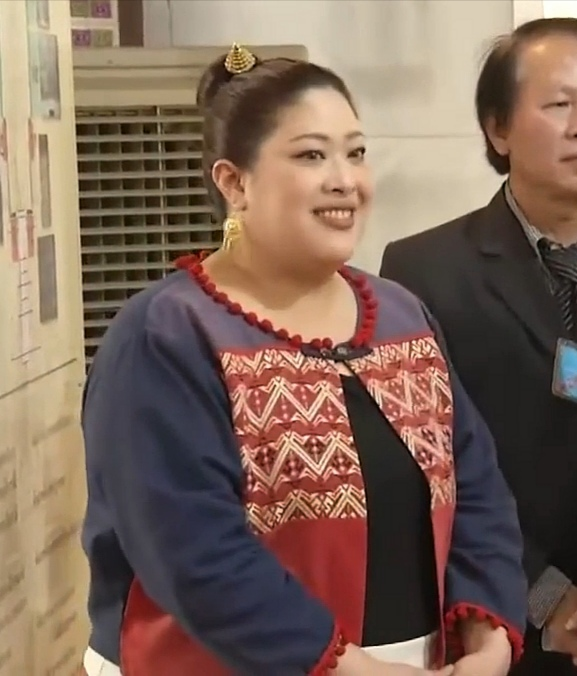
- Born: 8 October 1982 (age 44); Bangkok, Thailand
- House: Mahidol
- Dynasty: Chakri
- Father: Virayudh Tishyasarin
- Mother: Chulabhorn Walailak
- Religion: Theravada Buddhism
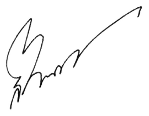
- Signature

Siribha Chudabhorn (Note: Thai: สิริภาจุฑาภรณ์, pronounced [sì.rì.pʰaː.tɕù.tʰaː.pʰɔːn]; RTGS: Siripha Chuthaphon}) (Note: Princess Siribha Chudabhorn does not normally use a surname, but when one is required, it may be Siribha Mahidol or Siripha Chuthaphon Didyasarin.) (born 8 October 1982), commonly known as Princess Ribha (Note: Thai: หริภา, pronounced [rì.pʰaː.]; RTGS: Ripha), is a Thai princess and artist. She is the elder daughter of Chulabhorn Walailak and Virayudh Tishyasarin, and the elder sister of Princess Aditayadorn Kitikhun.

On 5 May 2019, King Maha Vajiralongkorn changed her title from Phra Chao Lan Thoe Phra Ong Chao Siribha Chudabhorn to Phra Chao Worawong Thoe Phra Ong Chao Siribha Chudabhorn. She was also awarded the Order of Chula Chom Klao, First Class, and the King Rama X Royal Cypher Medal, First Class.

== Early life and education ==
Siribha Chudabhorn was born on 8 October 1982 in Bangkok. She attended Chitralada School before moving to the United States, where she studied at Holton-Arms School, Herbert Hoover Middle School and Walter Johnson High School. She later returned to Thailand and completed her secondary education at Chitralada School.

She studied at the Faculty of Painting, Sculpture and Graphic Arts, Silpakorn University, where she received a bachelor's degree with second-class honours and later a master's degree in Thai art.

== Art and cultural conservation ==
Siribha Chudabhorn has worked in painting and Thai art and has supported the conservation of historic buildings and murals. The Fine Arts Department has worked with her on projects involving the copying and conservation of mural paintings. In 2016, she visited Wat Pa Daet in Mae Chaem District, Chiang Mai, where she inspected the condition of the temple's murals and supported restoration and conservation work.

She was also involved in the restoration of Wat Thara Thip Chai Pradit in Chiang Mai. According to the Chiang Mai Public Relations Office, she became interested in the deteriorated temple and its murals while studying at Silpakorn University and later supported restoration work. She painted a mural depicting the Mahajanaka story and created a Buddha image named Siribha Niramit for the temple's main hall.

She has also supported activities at the Faculty of Painting, Sculpture and Graphic Arts at Silpakorn University and projects related to Thai arts and cultural preservation.

== Aviation and volunteer work ==
Siribha Chudabhorn has been involved in aviation and disaster-relief activities. She is president of the Siribha Chudabhorn Volunteer Aviation Operations Centre for Conservation and Rescue, which assists people affected by disasters. She has also held the position of honorary vice-chair of the Foundation for Conservation and Development of Thai Aircraft under Royal Patronage and honorary president of the Royal Aeronautic Sports Association of Thailand.

Her activities have included assistance for people affected by droughts, floods and other disasters, as well as projects under the Siribha Joint Rescue House initiative.

== Honours ==
Royal monogram

Royal flag of Princess Siribha Chudabhorn

Royal Title Style: “Her Royal Highness Princess”

- Thailand:
  - Dame Grand Cross of the Order of Chula Chom Klao, First Class (2019)
  - Dame Grand Cordon of the Order of the White Elephant
  - Dame Grand Cordon of the Order of the Crown of Thailand
  - Recipient of the King Bhumibol Cypher Badge Medal
  - Recipient of the Commemorative Medal on the Occasion of the Coronation of H.M. King Rama X
  - Recipient of the King Vajiralongkorn Royal Cypher Badge Medal

== See also ==
- King Bhumibol Adulyadej

== Notes ==
Siribha Chudabhorn House of Mahidol Cadet branch of the House of Chakri Born: 8 October 1982
Lines of succession
Preceded by The Princess Srisavangavadhana	Line of succession to the Thai throne 5th in line	Succeeded by Princess Aditayadorn Kitikhun
Order of precedence
Preceded by Prince Dipangkorn Rasmijoti	Thai order of precedence 9th position	Succeeded by Princess Aditayadorn Kitikhun
