= Chulabhorn =

Thai princess (born 1957)

Chulabhorn; จุฬาภรณ
- Princess Srisavangavadhana
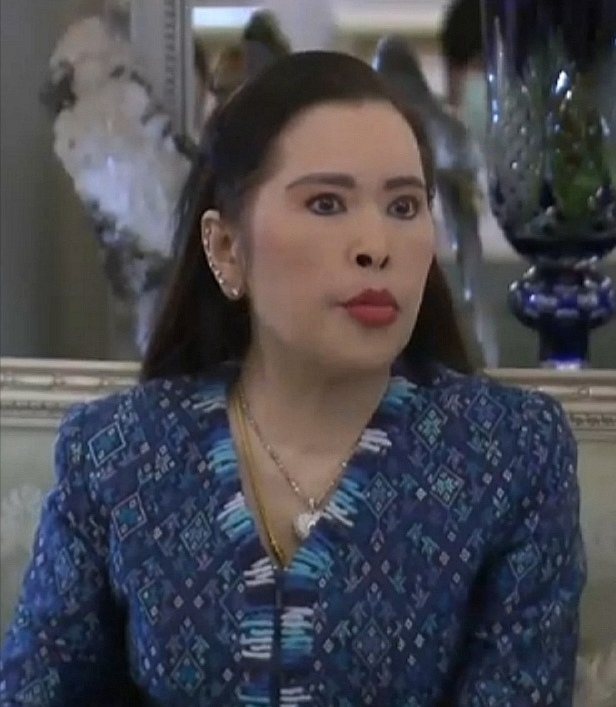
- Chulabhorn in 2020
- Born: 4 July 1957 (age 69); Bangkok, Thailand
- Spouse: Virayudh Tishyasarin (m. 1982; div. 1996)
- Issue: Siribha Chudabhorn; Aditayadorn Kitikhun
Names
- Chulabhorn Walailak Agrarajakumari
- House: Mahidol
- Dynasty: Chakri
- Father: Bhumibol Adulyadej (Rama IX)
- Mother: Sirikit Kitiyakara
- Religion: Theravada Buddhism

Chulabhorn, Princess Srisavangavadhana (Note: Thai: สมเด็จพระเจ้าน้องนางเธอ เจ้าฟ้าจุฬาภรณวลัยลักษณ์ อัครราชกุมารี กรมพระศรีสวางควัฒน วรขัตติยราชนารี, pronounced [sǒm.dèt.pʰráʔ.tɕâːw.nɔ́ːŋ.nāːŋ.tʰɤ̄ː tɕâːw.fáː.tɕù.lāː.pʰɔ̄ːn.wá.lāj.lák ʔàk.kʰrá.râːt.tɕʰā.kū.māː.rīː krōm.pʰráʔ.sǐː.sā.wǎːŋ.kʰā.wát wɔ̄ː.rā.kʰàt.tī.já.râːt.tɕʰā.nāː.rīː]) (born 4 July 1957) is a Thai princess. She is the youngest daughter of King Bhumibol Adulyadej (Rama IX) and Queen Sirikit, and the younger sister of King Vajiralongkorn (Rama X).

== Early life and education ==
Princess Chulabhorn was born on 4 July 1957 at Amphorn Sathan Residential Hall of the Dusit Palace in Bangkok. She studied chemistry and graduated in 1979 from the Faculty of Science at Kasetsart University, with a Bachelor of Science, First Class Honours. She continued to study Science at Mahidol University, where she received her Doctorate in 1985.

She is heavily involved in the promotion of scientific research, and regularly gives awards and prizes. She held the position of a guest lecturer in chemistry at the Mahidol University. She also serves as president of the Chulabhorn Research Institute. She was awarded the UNESCO Einstein Medal for her efforts in promoting scientific collaboration in 1986 and was the first Asian to be invited to join the Royal Society of Chemistry in the United Kingdom as an Honorary Fellow.

Later in 2019, she received a Ph.D. in Visual Arts from the Faculty of Painting, Sculpture and Graphic Arts, Silpakorn University.

== Personal life ==
On 7 January 1982, Chulabhorn married Royal Thai Air Force officer Group Captain Virayudh Tishyasarin (Thai: วีระยุทธ ดิษยะศริน; RTGS: Wirayut Dityasarin), a commoner, an Air vice-marshal. They have two children: Princess Siribha Chudabhorn and Princess Aditayadorn Kitikhun. According to royal custom, she would have lost her title upon marrying a man of lower rank. However, they divorced in February 1996, and she subsequently returned to the royal court.

She resides at Chakri Bongkot Palace.

== Official duties ==
The Princess visited Germany from 13 to 15 April 2010. During her visit she went to the German Cancer Research Center in Heidelberg to further her cancer research and to learn more about the developments the center had found. Princess Chulabhorn had visited the center already in 1986, 1995 and 2000.

In November 2016, Princess Chulabhorn visited Japan and met with then-Emperor Akihito and then-Empress Michiko at the Imperial Palace, Tokyo. The Imperial couple hosted a luncheon in her honor. During her visit to the country, The Princess went to Nagoya University, in Aichi Prefecture, to take part in a discussion between the "HRH Princess Chulabhorn College of Medical Science" in Thailand and the "School of Medicine" in the university.

In March 2023, Princess Chulabhorn officially visited Israel: during the visit she toured the Hadassah Ein Kerem hospital, in Jerusalem. Additionally, the Princess visited "Israel Diamond Exchange" with the Thai ambassador to Israel, Pannabha Chandraramya. At the event, Princess Chulabhorn discussed relations between Thailand and Israel. The president of the association, Boaz Moldawsky participated with the Princess in a ceremony in honor of the association. During her visit to the country, the Princess went to the Western Wall (also called as the Wailing Wall), in Jerusalem, to pray. She also learned the importance of that monument to the country.
In April 2023, Princess Chulabhorn visited the United States of America to attend the Health Summit for Pharmaceutical and Medical Development at Tufts University in Massachusetts. The Princess also toured the institute and subsequently visited the NCI Frederick Campus in Maryland.
In June 2023 Princess Chulabhorn also paid an official visit to Mongolia: during the visit she received an honorary Doctorate from the Mongolian University of Life Sciences, during the Princess's visit to the university headquarters in Ulaanbaatar.

== Health ==
On 6 September 2014, the Princess was admitted to Vichaiyut Hospital due to stomach inflammation: she was later diagnosed with gastritis and was advised to temporarily suspend royal duties.

On 9 October 2014, the Princess was diagnosed with a severe infection of the pancreas and swelling of the lymph glands: doctors concluded that she was suffering from an autoimmune disease called systemic lupus erythematosus, which she has since begun to treat. Doctors advised her to stop activities for three months. She had been in hospital since the previous September.

On 5 November 2015, Princess Chulabhorn underwent surgery at Vichaiyut hospital to remove seven polyps from her large intestine. A blood test had previously shown that the princess had a higher than normal level of carcinoembryonic antigen which indicated that she was likely to develop cancer.

In May 2016, the Princess was found to have a non-malignant tumor in her neck, and it was removed at Vichaiyut Hospital. She had to suspend her official duties to recover after the operation and to treat her pancreatitis, which she had been suffering from for a while and which was causing some health problems to her. As of July 2016, her pancreatitis was becoming intermittent and acute, a sign that it was worsening over time. To receive treatment, the Princess had to suspend her official commitments until she recovered.

In June 2017, the Princess was diagnosed with lung, liver and muscle inflammation and low blood oxygen levels: she went to Vichaiyuth Hospital due to fatigue, shortness of breath and other symptoms and doctors made the diagnosis, and subsequently administered medical treatment to her.

In February 2019, Princess Chulabhorn was admitted to Ramathibodi Hospital in Bangkok after developing back pain and blurred vision in both eyes. Doctors concluded that further tests were necessary and the Princess extended her stay in hospital.

In April 2019, Chulabhorn underwent surgery to remove cataracts (which had caused blurred vision) and underwent treatment for her newly diagnosed back infection (which caused back pain). Her recovery was confirmed a few days later.

On 30 September 2019, Chulabhorn went to Chulabhorn Hospital after experiencing numbness in her left hand. An MRI showed that the nerves under her left elbow had become compressed, and as a result the Princess had to remain in hospital for treatment and suspend royal duties. As a result of numbness in her left hand, Chulabhorn had to undergo microsurgery to remove the tissue causing the discomfort and remained in hospital until she fully recovered.

On 16 June 2020, Chulabhorn underwent surgery at Chulalongkorn Hospital due to numbness in the fingertips of her right hand, caused by a membrane compressing the nerve below her elbow. She was discharged approximately fifteen days later when she was judged to have recovered.

In early October 2024, she had to suspend her engagements and activities for a while in order to proceed with rehabilitation, due to a surgery underwent two months earlier because of pain in her left foot and ankle at Chulabhorn Hospital in Lak Si district.

== Titles, styles, honours, and awards ==
Styles of: Princess Chulabhorn; Princess Srisavangavadhana
- Reference style: Her Royal Highness
- Spoken style: Your Royal Highness

Title and styles

- 4 July 1957 – 5 May 2019 : Her Royal Highness Princess Chulabhorn Walailak Agrarajakumari
- 5 May 2019 – present : Her Royal Highness Princess Chulabhorn Walailak Agrarajakumari, Princess Srisavangavadhana

Royal monogram of Princess Chulabhorn Walailak

=== Military rank ===
- General, admiral and air chief marshal

=== Volunteer Defense Corps of Thailand rank ===
- Volunteer Defense Corps Colonel

=== Academic rank ===
- Professor of Navaminda Kasatriyadhiraj Royal Thai Air Force Academy (27 June 1986 – 1 October 1986)
- Professor Dr. in Organic Chemistry of Mahidol University

=== Foreign honours ===
- Japan: Paulownia Dame Grand Cordon of the Order of the Precious Crown
- (Kingdom of Nepal) Nepalese Royal Family: Member Grand Cross of the Most Glorious Order of the Benevolent Ruler
- Netherlands: Knight Grand Cross of the Order of Orange-Nassau
- Peru: Knight Grand Cross of the Order of Merit for Distinguished Services
- Spain: Knight Grand Cross of the Order of Isabella the Catholic
- Sweden: Member Grand Cross of the Royal Order of the Seraphim
- United Kingdom: Honorary Dame Grand Cross of the Royal Victorian Order

=== Other honours ===
Princess Chulabhorn received UNESCO's Einstein Medal for her years of work promoting scientific cooperation in the Asia - Pacific region. In 2009, she received the Adolf Windaus Medal.

Princess Chulabhorn has been an honorary member of the Society for Medicinal Plant and Natural Product Research since 1999.

== Taxon named in her honour ==
- Amblypharyngodon chulabhornae, the Princess Carplet, is a species of carplet in the family Cyprinidae from mainland south-east Asia.
Royal flag of Princess Chulabhorn

== Notes ==
Chulabhorn, the Princess Srisavangavadhana House of Mahidol Cadet branch of the House of Chakri Born: 4 July 1957
Lines of succession
Preceded by The Princess Royal	Line of succession to the Thai throne 4th in line	Succeeded by Princess Siribha Chudabhorn
Order of precedence
Preceded by The Princess Royal	Thai order of precedence 4th position	Succeeded by Princess Ubol Ratana
Educational offices
First	President of Chulabhorn Royal Academy Council; 2016–present	Incumbent
Non-profit organization positions
Preceded by Galyani Vadhana	President of Princess Mother's Medical Volunteer; 2008–present	Incumbent
