= Aditayadorn Kitikhun =

Princess of Thailand

Aditayadorn Kitikhun; อทิตยาทรกิติคุณ
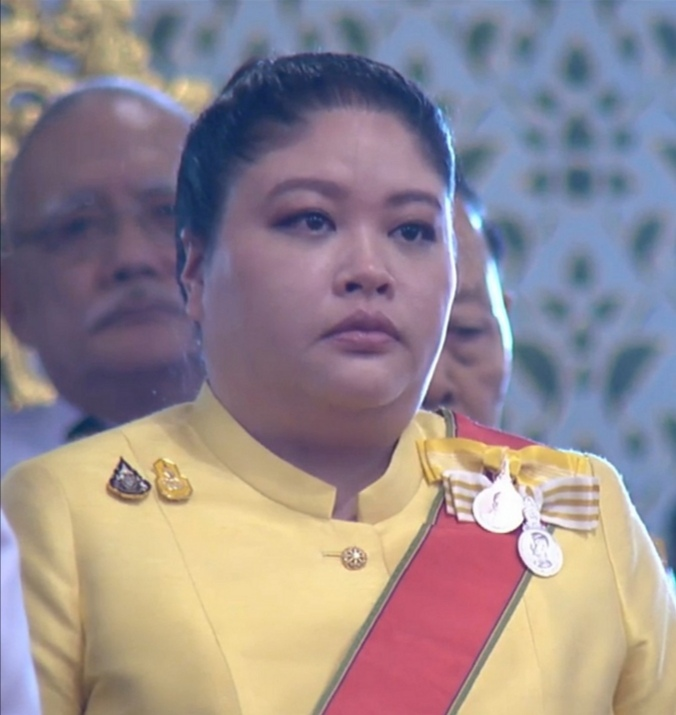
- Aditayadorn Kitikhun in 2019
- Born: 5 May 1984 (age 42); Bangkok, Thailand
- House: Mahidol
- Dynasty: Chakri
- Father: Virayudh Tishyasarin
- Mother: Chulabhorn Walailak
- Religion: Theravada Buddhism

Aditayadorn Kitikhun (Note: Thai: อทิตยาทรกิติคุณ, IPA: [àʔ.tʰít.tàʔ.jāːtʰɔːn.kì.tì.kʰun]; RTGS: Athittayathon Kitikhun) (Note: Princess Aditayadorn Kitikhun does not normally use a surname, but when one is required, it may be Aditayathorn Mahidol or Aditayathorn Kittikun Didyasarin.) (born 5 May 1984), commonly known as Princess Dita (Note: Thai: ติ๊ด; IPA: [tíd]), is the second daughter of Princess Chulabhorn Walailak and Virayudh Tishyasarin.

== Education ==
Princess Aditayadorn Kitikhun received a Bachelor of Arts degree in Communication Design from Mahidol University International College on 4 July 2011. Her graduating thesis titled "Redesign Packaging for Royal Chitralada Agricultural Products" was displayed at the annual Media Arts Exhibition at Bangkok Art and Culture Centre hosted by the Fine and Applied Arts division during 2–5 August 2011.

On 21 November 2017 she received the Graduate Certificate in the Department of Agricultural Technology of Rajamangala University of Technology (RMUT).

== National honours ==
Royal Monogram

Royal flag of Princess Aditayadorn Kitikhun

Royal Title Style: “Her Royal Highness Princess”

- Dame Grand Cross (First Class) of the Most Illustrious Order of Chula Chom Klao (2019)
- Dame Grand Cordon (Special Class) of the Most Exalted Order of the White Elephant
- Dame Grand Cordon (Special Class) of the Most Noble Order of the Crown of Thailand
- King Rama X Royal Cypher Medal (2019)
- King Rama X Coronation Medal (2019)

== See also ==
- King Bhumibol Adulyadej
- Queen Sirikit

== Notes ==
Aditayadorn Kitikhun House of Mahidol Cadet branch of the House of Chakri Born: 6 May 1984
Lines of succession
Preceded by Princess Siribha Chudabhorn	Line of succession to the Thai throne 6th in line	Succeeded by Prince Nawaphan Yugala
Order of precedence
Preceded by Princess Siribha Chudabhorn	Thai order of precedence 10th position	Succeeded by Dame Ploypailin Jensen
