= Flag of Thailand =

- Trairanga (Thai: ธงไตรรงค์, RTGS: thong trai rong), 'Tricolour flag'
- Use: National flag, civil and state ensign
- Proportion: 2:3
- Adopted: 28 September 1917; 109 years ago (standardised on 30 September 2017)
- Design: Five horizontal stripes of red, white, blue, white and red, the middle stripe twice as wide as the others
- Designed by: King Vajiravudh (Rama VI)
- Thai: ธงราชนาวี (RTGS: thong ratcha nawi), 'Royal Navy flag'
- Use: Naval ensign
- Proportion: 2:3
- Adopted: 28 September 1917 (de jure)
- Design: A red disc containing a white elephant (Airavata) in regalia centred on the national flag

The flag of Thailand (Thai: ธงไตรรงค์; RTGS: thong trai rong, meaning 'tricolour flag') consists of five horizontal stripes of red, white, blue, white and red, with the central blue stripe being twice as wide as each of the other four. The design was adopted on 28 September 1917, according to the royal decree issued by King Vajiravudh (Rama VI). Since 2016, that day is a national day of importance in Thailand celebrating the flag.

The colours are said to stand for nation-religion-king, an unofficial motto of Thailand, red for the land and people, white for religions and blue for the monarchy, the last having been the auspicious colour of Rama VI. As the king declared war on Germany that July, some note the flag now bore the same colours as those of the UK, France, Russia and the United States.

== Design ==
The Flag Act of BE 2522 (1979) stipulates the design of the national flag as "rectangular in shape with 6 part width and 9 part length, divided into five stripes throughout the length of the flag; with the middle stripe being 2 part wide, of deep blue colour, and the white stripes being 1 part wide next to each side of the deep blue stripes, and the red stripes being 1 part wide next to each side of the white stripes. The National Flag shall also be called the Tri-Rong flag".

The flag is almost identical to the Flag of Costa Rica because they both feature five horizontal stripes of red, white, and blue, with the centre stripe being twice as thick as the others. However, the colour orders are reversed.

=== Colour standards ===
The colours of the flag were standardised in an announcement of the Office of the Prime Minister dated 30 September 2017, on the occasion of the 100th anniversary of its adoption. It gives recommended values for determining the standard colours of physical cloth flags, defined in the CIELAB colour space under Illuminant D65. RGB, HEX and CMYK values are derived by NSTDA.

Colour	CIELAB D65				Other colour values		
Colour	L*	a*	b*	ΔE*	RGB	HEX	CMYK
Red	36.4	55.47	25.42	≤1.5	165-25-49	#A51931	C24-M100-Y83-K18
White	96.61	-0.15	-1.48	≤1.5	244-245-248	#F4F5F8	C3-M2-Y1-K0
Blue	18.63	7.89	-19.45	≤1.5	45-42-74	#2D2A4A	C87-M85-Y42-K43

Using official CMYK colours

=== Construction Sheet ===
flag construction sheet

== History ==
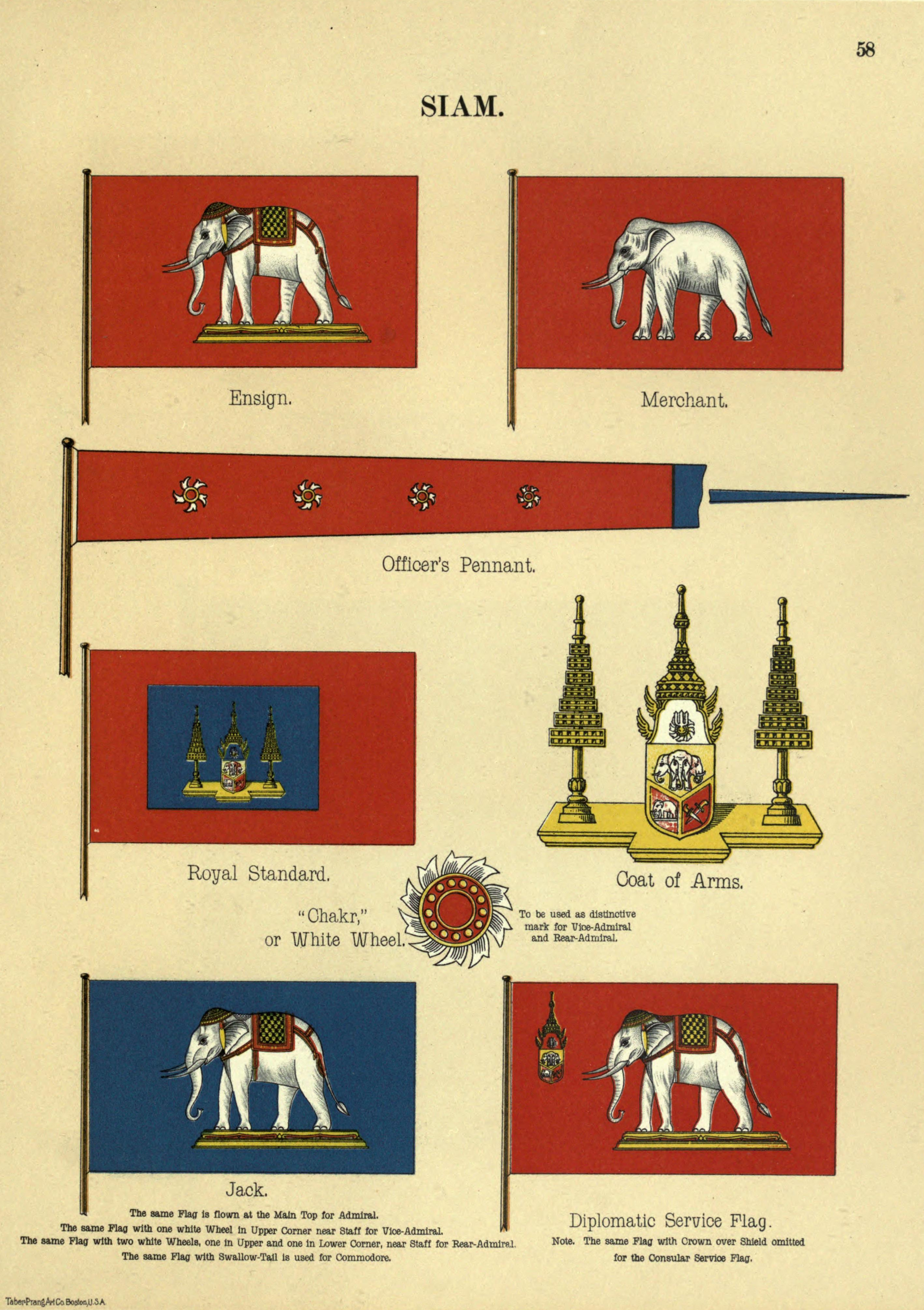
Flags of Siam in 1899

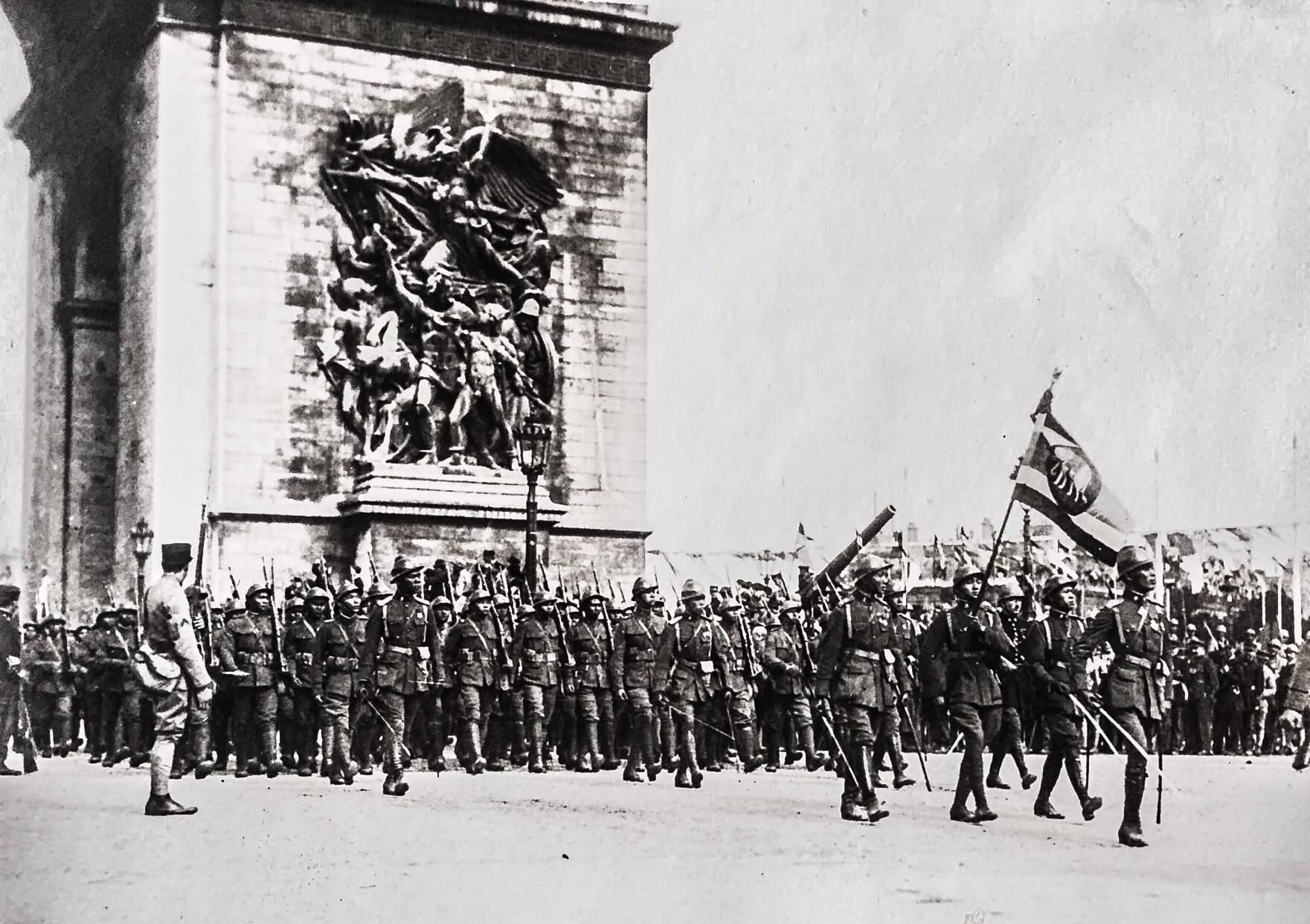
The Siamese Expeditionary Force during World War I with the unit colours in Paris, 1919

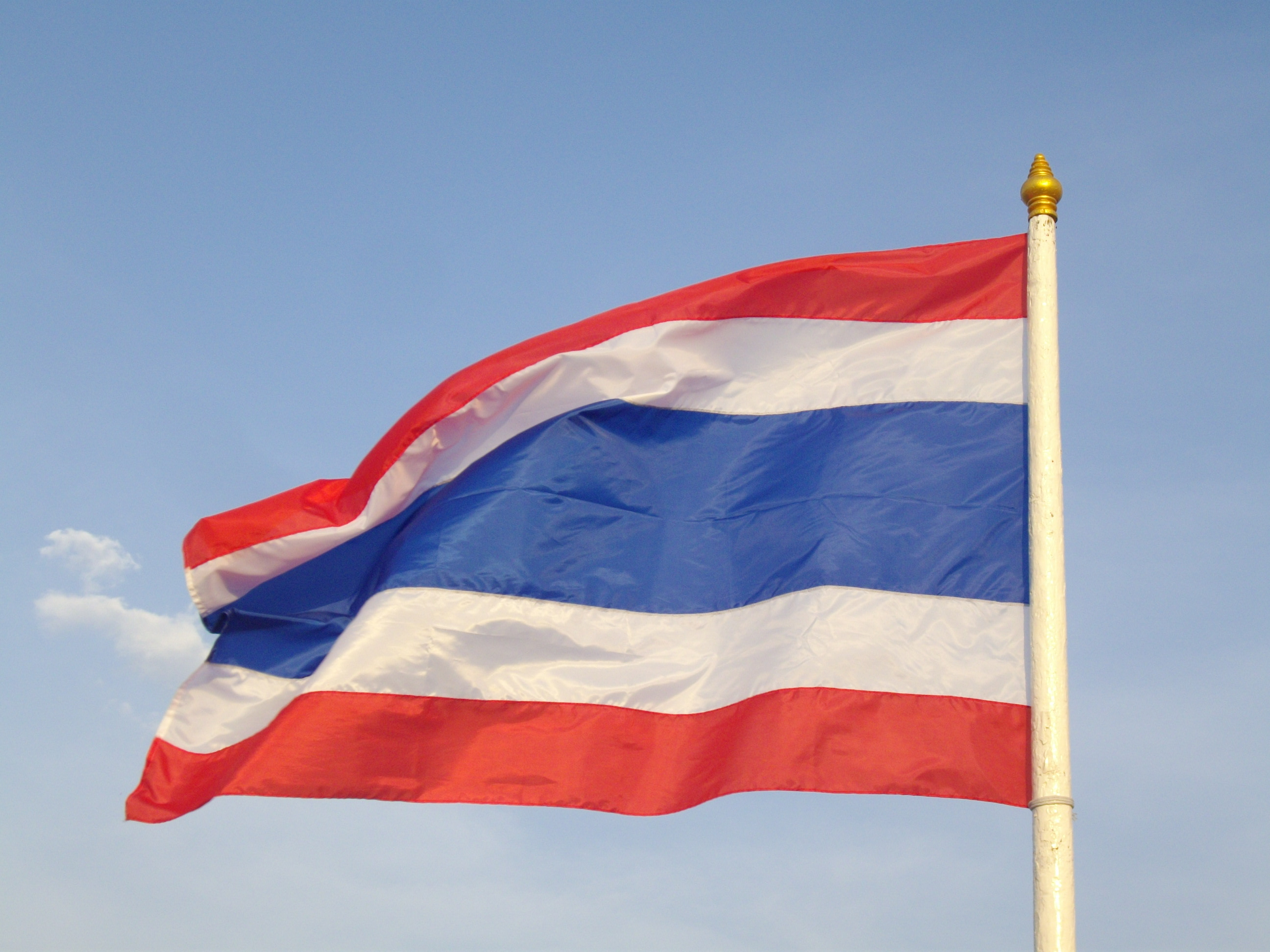
National flag of Thailand being flown in 2009

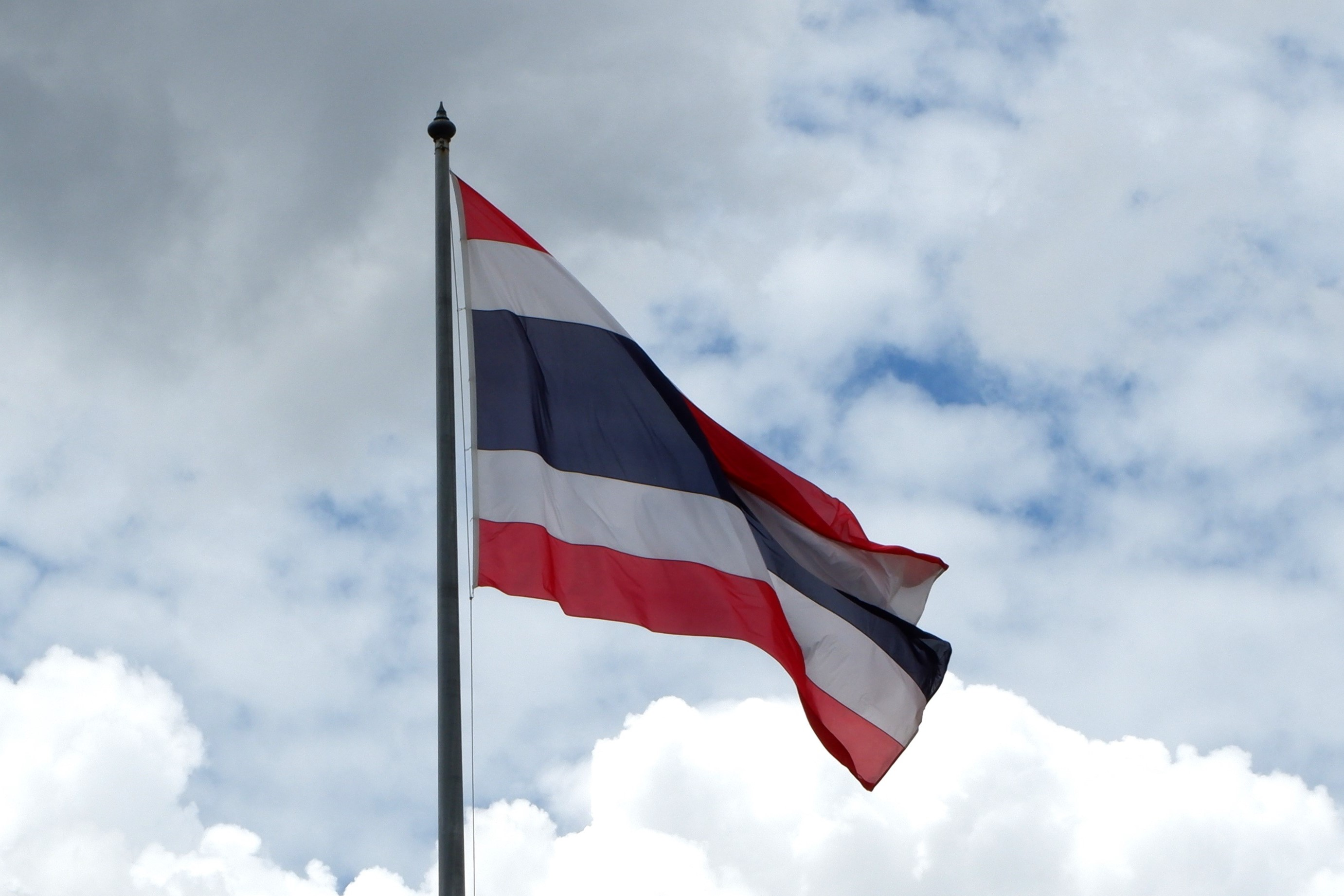
Flag of Thailand flown in front of the Ministry of Defence in 2019

The first flag used for Siam was probably a plain red one, first used under Narai (1656–1688). Naval flags later used different symbols on the red ground—a white chakra, or the Hindu mythological elephant Airavata inside the chakra.

Officially the first flag was created in 1855 by Mongkut (Rama IV), showing a white elephant on red ground, as the plain coloured flag was not distinct enough for international relations.

In 1916 the flag was changed to show a white elephant in royal regalia. In 1916, the current design, but with the middle colour being the same red as the outer stripe, was defined as the civil ensign. According to a popular legend, king Vajiravudh (Rama VI) was appalled when he saw the elephant flag flown upside down by one of his subjects by accident, which caused him to order the creation of a vertically symmetrical design. Initially (1916/17), this was a purely red and white design of five horizontal stripes. Later in 1917, the middle colour was changed to dark blue, which was similar in tone to indigo or purple, which at the time was regarded as the auspicious colour for Saturday, the day Vajiravudh was born. According to other sources, the blue was also chosen to show solidarity with the Allies of World War I, which also had the colours blue-red-white in their flags.

=== Historical national flags ===
Flag	Date	Use	Description
	c. 1680 – c. 1782	National ensign during late Ayutthaya and Thonburi periods	A red plain rectangular flag.
	c. 1782–1855	Civil ensign prior to 1855	A red plain rectangular flag.
	c. 1782 – c. 1817	State and naval ensign decreed by Phutthayotfa Chulalok (Rama I)	Red flag with a white chakra, presumably to represent the Chakri dynasty.
	c. 1817–1855	Change instituted by Phutthaloetla Naphalai (Rama II)	Red flag with a white elephant inside the chakra.
	c. 1843–1855	Alternative civil ensign from 1843 to 1855	A white elephant, facing the hoist, centred on a red field. Thai: ธงช้างเผือก (Thong Chang Puak)
	1855–1893	National ensign decreed by Mongkut (Rama IV)	A white elephant, facing the hoist, centred on a red field. Thai: ธงช้างเผือก (Thong Chang Puak)
	1893–1916	Civil ensign until 1916	A white elephant, facing the hoist, centred on a red field. Thai: ธงช้างเผือก (Thong Chang Puak)
	1893–1898	State and naval ensign, to be displayed defaced with the flyer's emblem on the upper hoist corner	A white elephant in regalia, facing the hoist, centred on a red field
	1898–1912	State and naval ensign	A white elephant in regalia, facing the hoist, centred on a red field
	1912–1917	State flag and ensign, decreed by Vajiravudh (Rama VI)	A white elephant in regalia, facing the hoist, centred on a red field
	1916–1917	Civil ensign	Red flag with two horizontal white stripes one-sixth wide, one-sixth from the top and bottom
	1917–present	National flag, civil and state ensign	Flag with horizontal blue stripe one-third wide between white stripes one-sixth wide, between red stripes one-sixth wide, known as the Trairanga.

== Maritime flags ==
Naval ensign of Thailand

Naval jack of Thailand

The naval ensign of the Royal Thai Navy (RTN) is the national flag with a red circle in the middle that reaches as far as the red stripes at the top and bottom. In the circle stands a white elephant, in full caparison, facing the hoist. The kingdom's naval jack is the national flag defaced with the emblem of the Royal Thai Navy in the middle. The regimental colours of the RTN is as same as this flag; both ensigns were adopted in 1917.

== See also ==
- List of Thai flags
- Royal Standard of Thailand
- Royal Flags of Thailand
- List of Military flags of Thailand
- Flags of Costa Rica, similar designs (but the red and blue colours are reversed)
- Flag of India, which has a similar name "Tiranga"
- Flag desecration in Thailand

== Sources ==
- Macharoen, Chawingam (2002). Thong Thai Laem 1. Bangkok. ISBN 974-419-454-5.
