= Royal standard of Thailand =

Flag of the King of Thailand

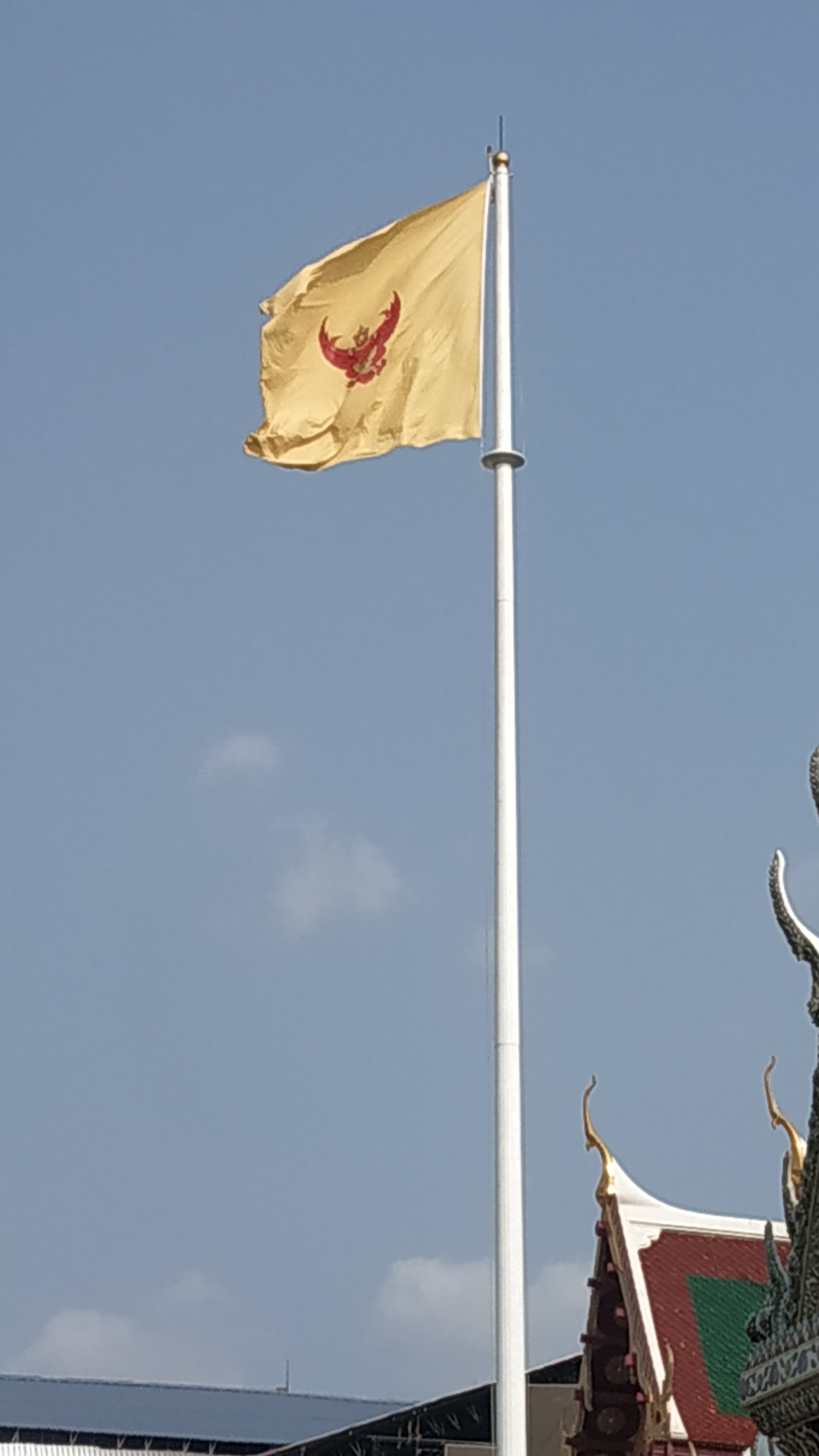
Royal Standard at the Grand Palace.

The Royal Standard of Thailand (Thai: ธงมหาราช; BGN/PCGN: Thong Maharat) is the official flag of the King of Thailand. The present form was adopted in 1910 under Vajiravudh (Rama VI), superseding the first Royal Standard created by Mongkut (Rama IV) in 1855. In 1979, the designs were codified by law; specifically in Article 2 of the Flag Act of 1979 (พระราชบัญญัติธง พ.ศ. ๒๕๒๒), which also regulated Thailand's other flags. The standard is currently used by Maha Vajiralongkorn, also known as Rama X, since 2016.

== Description ==
The Royal Standard consists of a bright yellow square with a red Royal Garuda at the center. The Hindu and Buddhist god, the Garuda, is the national emblem and the official symbol or 'arms' of the King. The Garuda has been the symbol of the monarchy since Ayutthaya. Readopted in 1910, Rama VI decided to replace all of the Royal Standards to feature the Garuda.

== Uses ==
The standards are usually hoisted at the King's palace of residence, sea or land vehicles and as an emblem on the side of the royal aircraft. The standard is also used on ceremonial occasions and official business by the King. The use of these standards are reserved exclusively to the monarchy and are not commonly seen. Unlike the King's personal flag which are commonly seen all over Thailand, usually flying alongside the National flag.

== Other members of the royal family ==
The Law also adopted flags for other members of the royal family as well as the regent of Thailand.

Standard	Dates	Use	Details
	1910–present	Standard of the Queen of Thailand (ธงราชินี: Thong Rajini)	Similar to the Royal Standard in the ratio of 2:3 with swallow-tail end. Currently used by Queen Suthida.
	1979–present	Standard for other senior members of the Royal Family (Most recently used by the Princess Srinagarindra, The Princess Mother) (ธงบรมราชวงศ์: Thong Boromrajawong)	Equal in ratio to the Standard of the Queen in the ratio of 2:3 with swallow-tail end. The blue middle square depicts the Royal Crown atop two bowls on a table flanked by two five-tiered royal umbrellas. Currently not in use.
	1910–present	Standard of the Crown Prince of Thailand (ธงเยาวราชฝ่ายหน้า: Thong Yaowarat Fai Na)	A dark blue square flag with the smaller Royal Standard in the center. Currently not in use.
	2019–present	Standard of Princess Maha Chakri Sirindhorn (ธงสมเด็จพระกนิษฐาธิราชเจ้า: Thong Somdet Phra Kanishthadhiraj Chao)	Dark blue rectangle with the ratio of 2:3 defaced with the Royal Standard. The flag is swallow-tail and has the royal monogram of Princess Maha Chakri Sirindhorn at the canton.
	2019–present	Standard of Princess Chulabhorn Krom Phra Srisavangavadhana (ธงสมเด็จเจ้าฟ้า ฯ กรมพระศรีสวางควัฒน วรขัตติยราชนารี: Thong Somdet Chao Fa Krom Phra Srisavangavadhana Vorakhattiya Rajanari)	Dark blue rectangle defaced with yellow circle. The circle features the red Garuda. At the canton of the blue field has the royal monogram of Princess Chulabhorn Walailak. The flag is swallow-tail
	1910–present	Standard for the Royal Consort of the Crown Prince of Thailand (ธงเยาวราชฝ่ายใน: Thong Yaowarat Fai Nai)	Dark blue rectangle with the ratio of 2:3 defaced with the Royal Standard. The flag is swallow-tail. Currently not in use.
	1910–present	Standard for the King's sons and brothers (ธงราชวงศ์ฝ่ายหน้า: Thong Rajawong Fai Na)	Dark blue square defaced with yellow circle. The circle features the red Garuda. Currently in use for Prince Dipangkorn Rasmijoti.
	1910–present	Standard for the King's daughters and sisters (ธงราชวงศ์ฝ่ายใน: Thong Rajawong Fai Nai)	Similar to the Standard for the male royalty in the ratio of 2:3 with swallow-tail end. Currently used by Princess Sirivannavari and other princesses.
	1936–present	Standard for the Regent of Thailand (ธงผู้สำเร็จราชการแทนพระองค์: Thong Phu Samret Rajakarn Thaen Phra Ong)	A white plain square flag with the Garuda on top of a shield depicting the National Flag in the center. Recently used for Prem Tinsulanonda.

== Gallery ==
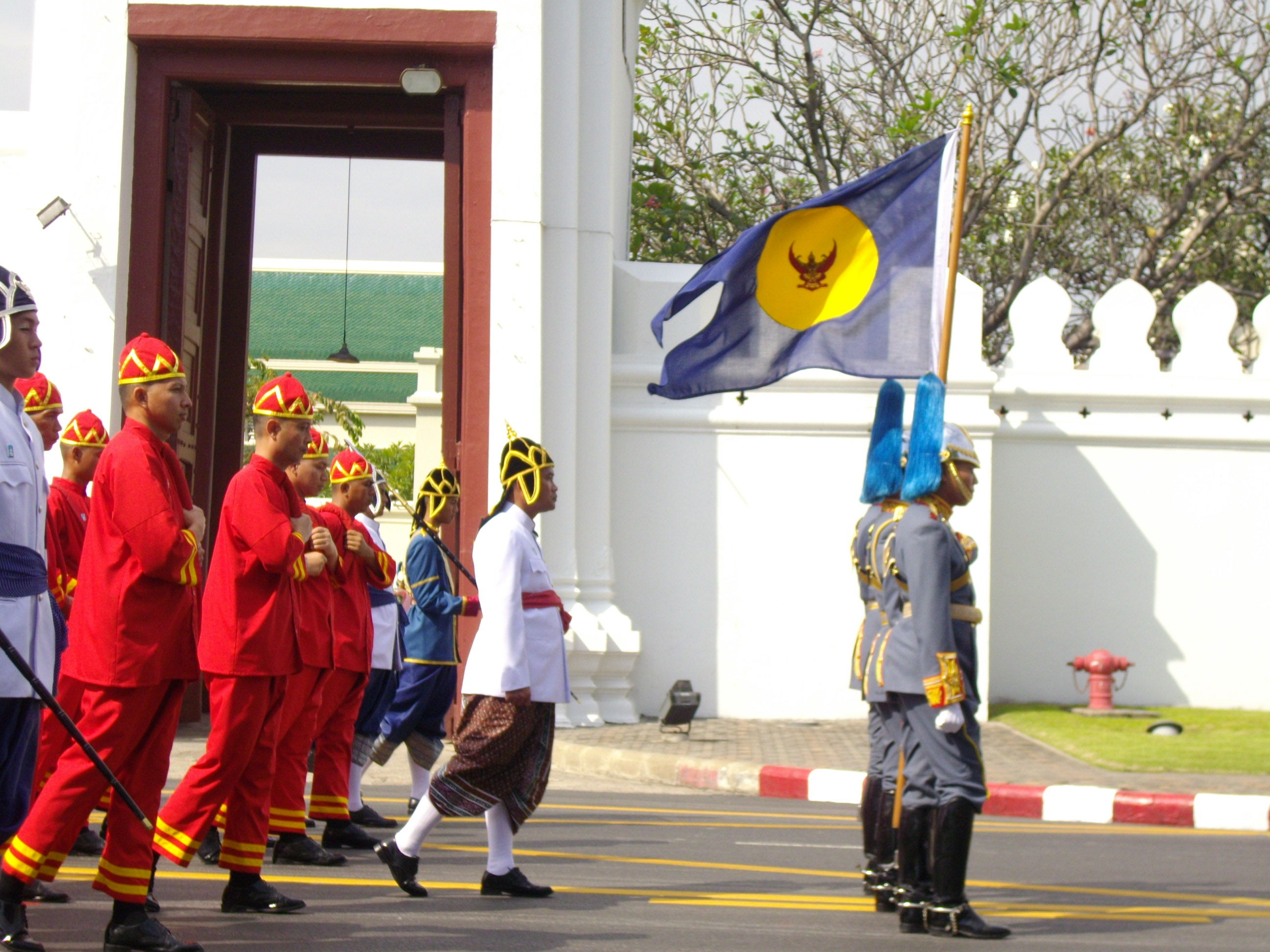
The Standard for the Princess of Thailand was carried by royal guards during the funeral procession of Princess Galyani Vadhana in 2008.

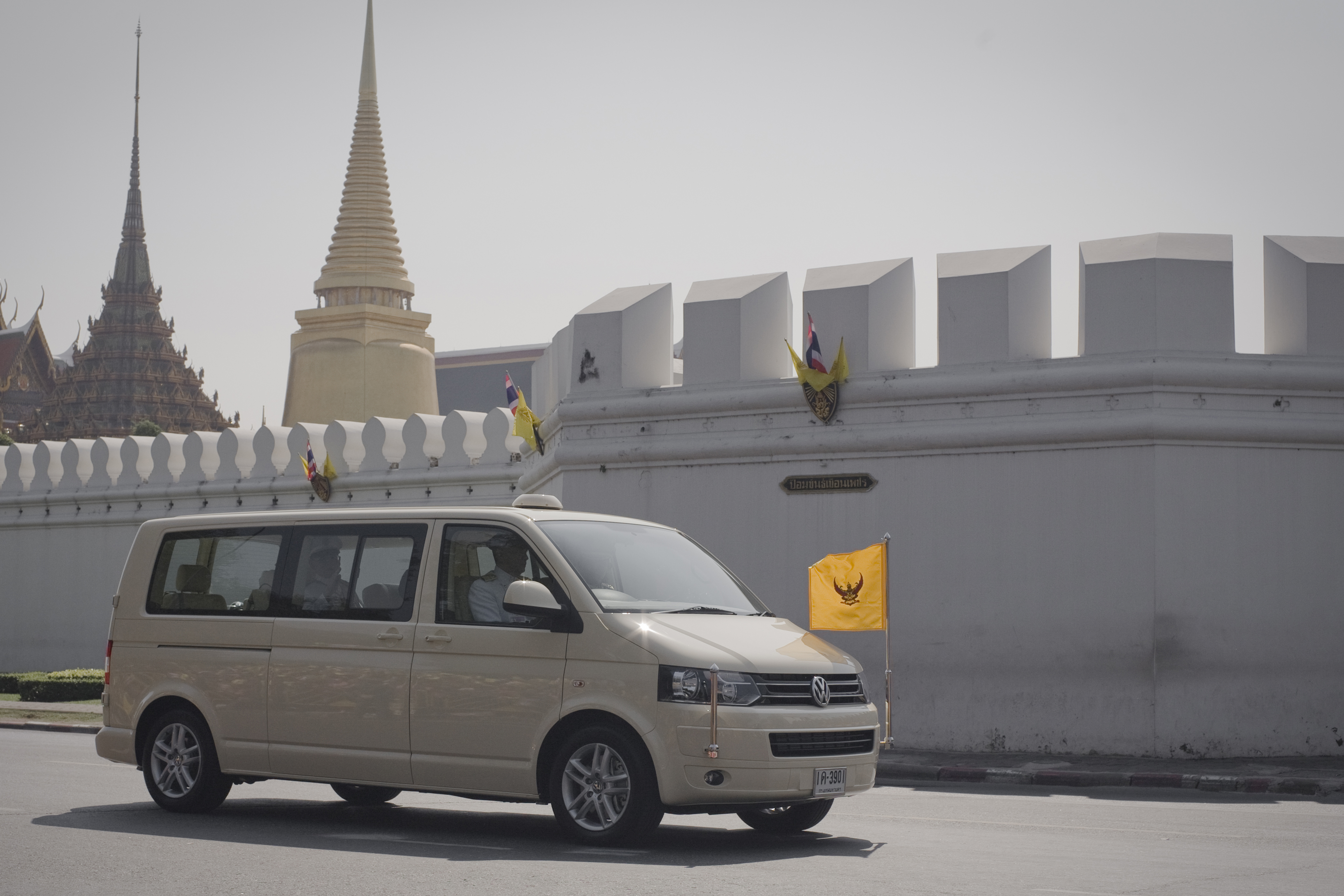
The royal standard at King Rama IX's car in his 83rd birthday anniversary ceremony, December 5, 2010.

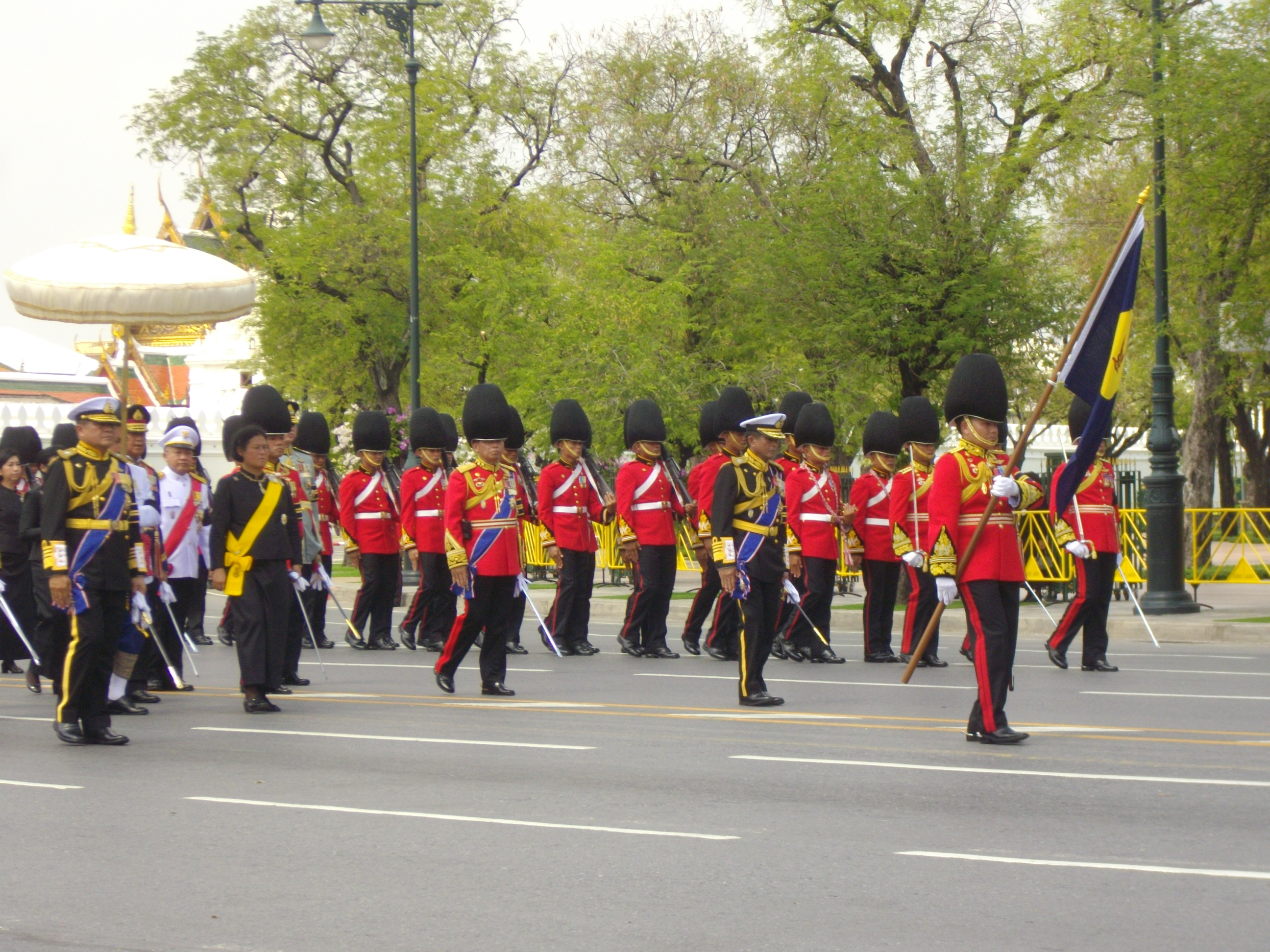
The Standard for the Princess of Thailand in the procession of Princess Maha Chakri Sirindhorn in 2012.

== Historical standards ==
King Mongkut's Privy seal.

=== Fourth reign ===
Mongkut (Rama IV) felt the need to create a Royal standard to distinguish his royal barge from other vessels during his many travels around the Kingdom and to fly above the Grand Palace when he is in residence. In 1855 a Royal Standard was created called the 'Thong Chom Klao' (ธงจอมเกล้า).

The standard featured a red rectangular flag with a smaller dark blue rectangle inside. Within the dark blue rectangle depicts the Great Crown of Victory on a stand flanked by two seven-tiered Royal Umbrellas. The Crown itself is derived from the King's personal seal, which in itself is a canting of both his given name and ceremonial name: Mongkut (มงกุฎ) and Chom Klao (จอมเกล้า) both meaning 'Crown' in Thai. The crown and the umbrellas are situated on a golden platform.

However the sight of an empty flagpole when the King was not in residence at the palace was considered inauspicious, therefore a second flag was ordered to be hoisted during the King's absence. This flag is called the 'Thong Airapot' (ธงไอยราพต), the rectangular red flag depicts a mythical three-headed white elephant (Airavata) in full regalia standing on a golden base with a golden pavilion on its back. Within the pavilion is the Thai symbol for Aum or Unalom. The elephant is then flanked on two sides are two seven-tiered Royal Umbrellas.

'Thong Chom Klao' (ธงจอมเกล้า), Standard of King Mongkut

'Thong Airapot' (ธงไอยราพต), 'Absence' standard (used when the King is not in residence).

=== Fifth reign ===
In 1891, King Chulalongkorn (Rama V) decided to promulgate a new law to reform the Royal Standard and create for the first time ranks flags for members of the Royal Family. The Royal Standard was changed by adding the new Arms of Dominion, which is a golden shield divided into three parts. The first in yellow depicts a three-headed mythical elephant representing Siam, the second quarter in red depicts a single white elephant for Laos (Lan Xang) and the third quarter in pink depicts two crossed Krisses for the Malay suzerainty (Siam was later forced to relinquish these territories by the French and British, respectively). Inside the crown the symbol for the Chakri dynasty is added; it depicts an intertwined Chakra and Trisula. The flag ratio is 5:6 The name of the Royal Standard was then changed to 'Thong Boromrajathawat Maha Siaminthra' (ธงบรมราชธวัชมหาสยามินทร์), A few years later in 1897 the name was permanently changed to 'Thong Maharat'.

The King retained the second colours by replacing the Unalom with his own royal cypher (จ ป ร, derive from "จุฬาลงกรณ์ ปรมราชาธิราช": Chulalongkorn Paramarajadhiraja; equivalent to Chulalongkorn Rex), which in turn is topped by the Royal Coronet or Phra Kiao (พระเกี้ยว). The name of this flag was also changed to the 'Thong Chudhathipathai' (ธงจุฑาธิปไตย).

'Thong Boromrajathawat Maha Siaminthra' (ธงบรมราชธวัชมหาสยามินทร์), the King;'s standard in 1891–1897.

'Thong Chudhathipathai' (ธงจุฑาธิปไตย), 'Absence' standard, with the Royal Cypher of King Rama V

'Thong Maharat' (ธงมหาราช), the King's standard in 1897–1910.

King Rama V's royal cypher "จ ป ร," topped by the royal coronet.

==== Other members of the royal family ====
Standard	Dates	Use	Details
	1887–1897	Standard of the Crown Prince of Siam	A red flag with the white pillow with the royal coronet above.
	1891–1897	Standard for other members of the Chakri dynasty (ธงเยาวราชธวัช: Thong Yaowaratthawat)	A red flag with the Royal Shield with the Chakra and Trisula above.
	1897–1910	Standard of the Queen of Siam	Similar to the Royal Standard in the ratio of 2:3 with swallow-tail end.
	1897–1910	Standard of the Crown Prince of Siam	A dark blue flag with the Royal Arms with the Crown, Chakra and Trisula in the center on a platform with two Royal Five-tiered Umbrellas to the side.
	1897–1910	Standard for the Consort of the Crown Prince of Siam	Dark blue rectangle with the ratio of 2:3. Similar to the Crown Prince's Standard, the flag is however swallow-tail.
	1897–1910	Standard for the King's sons and brothers	Dark blue square with the Royal Arms with the Crown, Chakra and Trisula in the center.
	1899–1910	Standard for the King's daughters and sisters	Similar to the Standard for the male royalty in the ratio of 2:3 with swallow-tail end.

=== Sixth reign ===
In 1910 Vajiravudh replaced the Royal Standard and Royal rank flags to mirror the change of the national emblem from the Coat of Arms of Siam to the Royal Garuda. These flags are retained and in use to this day. Six years later he also redesigned the national flag and naval ensigns.

== See also ==
- Royal flags of Thailand - Personal flags of the various members of the Thai Royal Family
- Emblem of Thailand
- Monarchy of Thailand
- Royal Standard
- List of Thai flags
