= Royal flags of Thailand =

Flown to honor the king and royal family

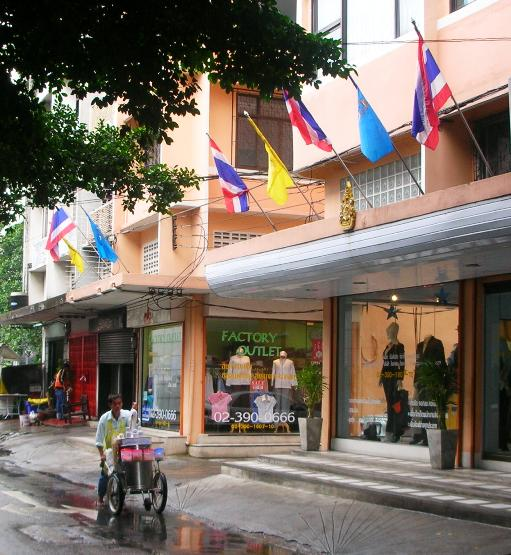
Usual display of royal flags alternating with the flag of Thailand on a street in Bangkok

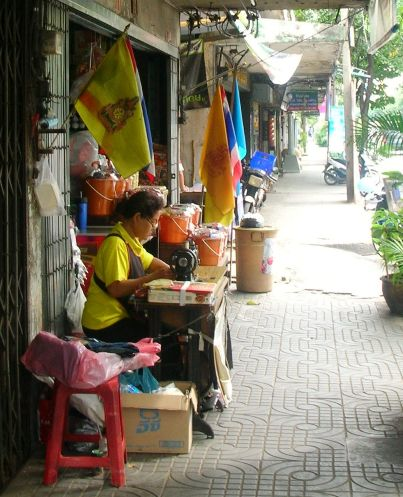
Shop selling flags in Thailand. This picture taken around 2006.

The royal flags of Thailand (Thai: ธงประจำพระองค์) are personal royal flags that are usually flown in Thailand, along with the national flag, to honor the King and royal family. Unlike the royal standards displayed only in special ceremonies and in particular locations, the royal flags are seen throughout Thailand. They are not commonly seen outside the country.

== Description ==
The main royal flags are that of the king of Thailand, Maha Vajiralongkorn, known as the "Tenth king" (Rama X), and his consort Queen Suthida. The flag of the previous monarch, King Bhumibol Adulyadej, and the flag for late Queen Mother Sirikit are still widely used. These flags are in plain colors with their respective royal cyphers. Other members of the royal family, such as Princess Maha Chakri Sirindhorn and Princess Chulabhorn, also have their own plain-color flags, but these are not seen very often, except at ceremonies personally led by them.

The royal flags are not only used officially, but also unofficially. They are displayed by Thai citizens of any social class or background at any location, usually beside the Thai flag, as a homage to their king. Honoring the royal family is a characteristic feature of Thai culture.

These flags are sold at most small stores and grocery stores in every town and village of Thailand. They come in many different sizes. Usually the symbol is printed only on one side of the flag.

== Flag of the King ==
=== King Rama X and King Rama IX ===
The King's flag are in yellow, the color of Monday, the day of his birth. It always has a symbol in the middle. There are a variety of symbols, but recently most king's flags have different symbols, such as the symbol marking King Bhumibol's 80th birthday, symbol commemorating the 60th anniversary of King Bhumibol's accession to the throne, or the one commemorating the 6th cycle of King Vajiralongkorn's birthday.

Both emblems in the center of the flag are quite complex, involving Buddhist iconography and ancient royal symbols of authority as well, such as the multi-tiered white umbrella. The king's symbols are always topped by the royal crown. Sometimes light rays are emanating from the top of the crown, these are also an element of royal symbology. In simplified versions of the flag the central symbol may come simply outlined in red.

Yellow is the color identified with the king in Thailand (as well as the previous king, both were born on a Monday). Many Thais like to wear yellow shirts as an informal homage to their king, especially on Mondays, the day of his birth.

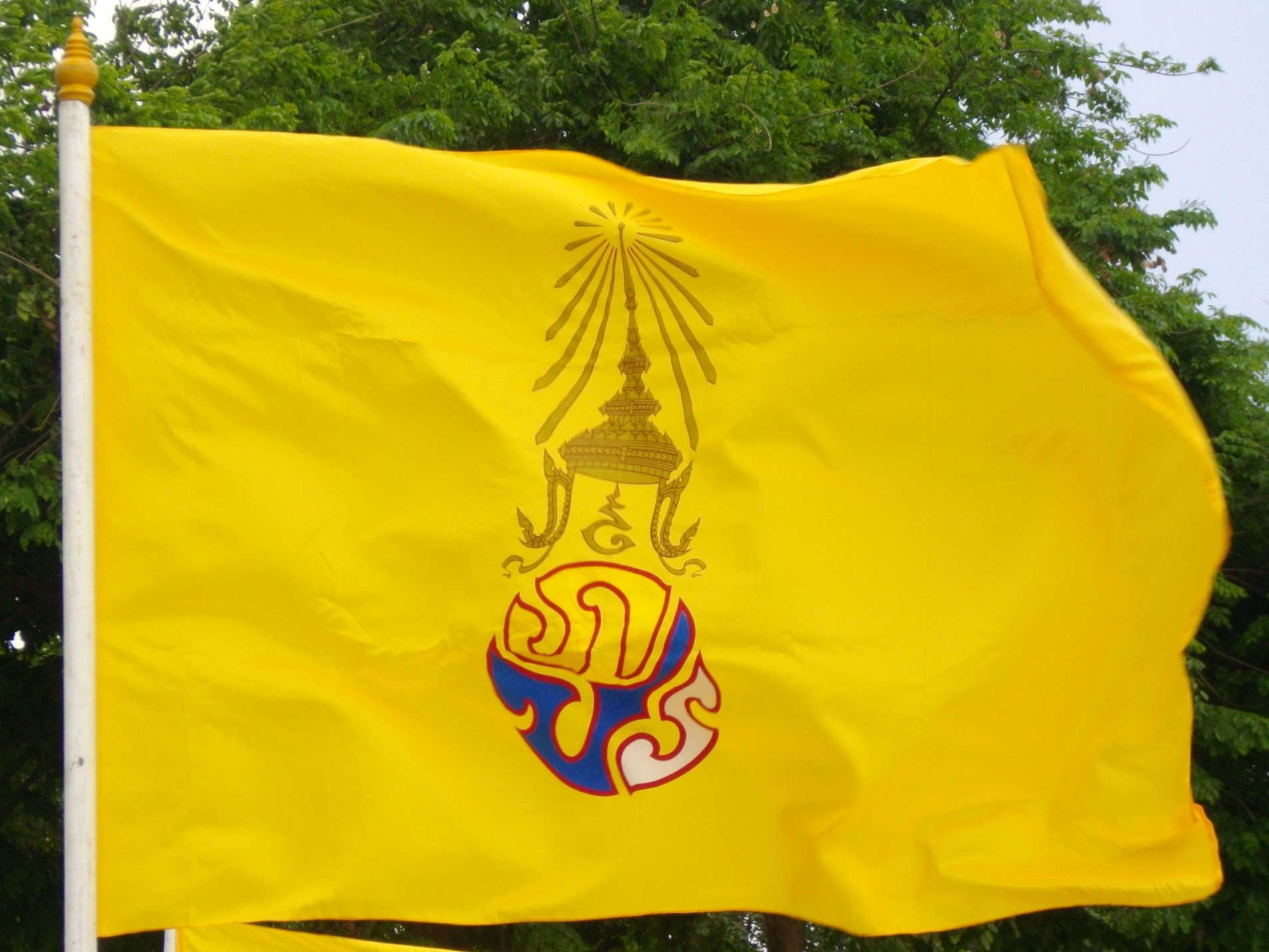
Royal flag of King Rama IX. The flag was yellow with personal monogram in the middle.

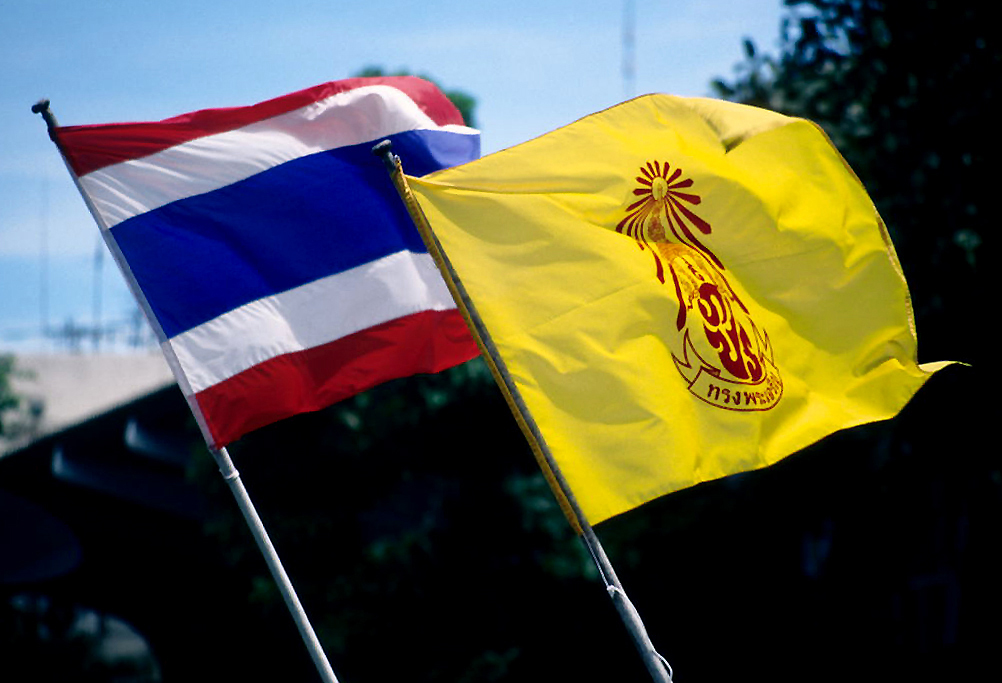
The national flag display along with the simplified version of the royal flag of King Rama IX.

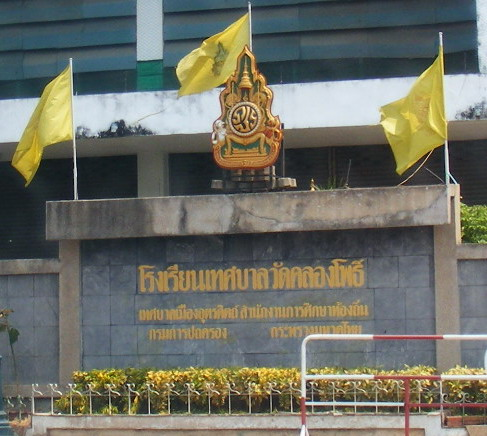
Flag on the 60th anniversary of King Bhumibol's ascension to the throne in 2006.

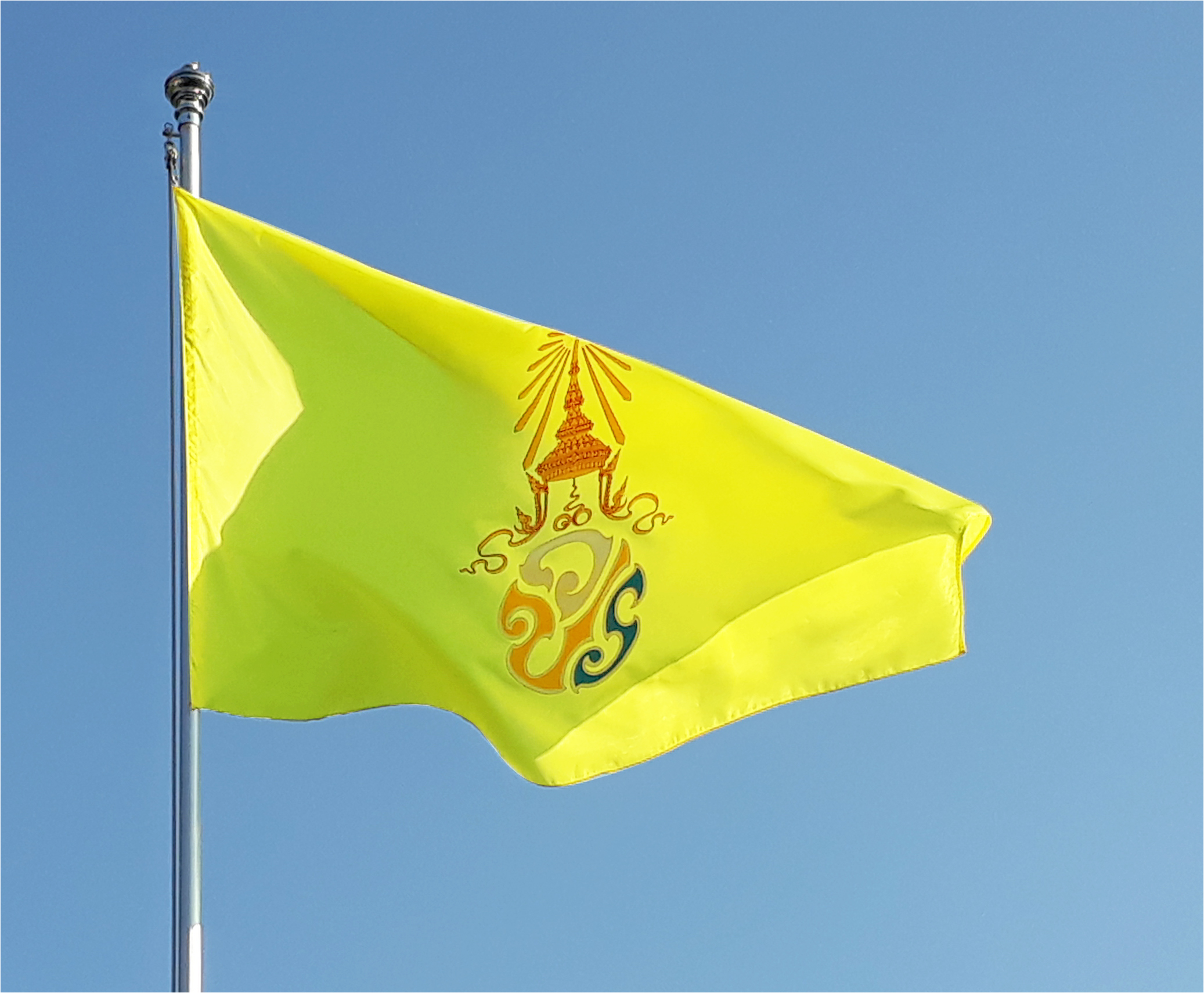
Royal flag of King Vajiralongkorn. The flag is yellow with personal monogram in the middle.

== Flag of the Queen ==
=== Queen Suthida ===
Queen Suthida's flag is purple. It is the color of Saturday, and on her birthday, there is a symbol "ส.ท." in the middle. The symbol is the abbreviation of Queen Suthida (ส.ท.: สุทิดา) under the Royal Crown. This flag has been in effect from June 2019 until now, after the royal coronation ceremony. This flag is mostly displayed around June, the month of the Queen's birth.

=== Queen Sirikit The Queen Mother ===
The Queen Mother's flag is in blue, the color of Friday, the day of her birth. Unlike the flag of the king, her flag has always the same symbol in the middle. The symbol is he personal cypher (ส.ก.: สิริกิติ์), the white letter intertwined with the dark blue letter, below a yellow or golden royal crown, sometimes with a scroll with Thai writing underneath. In simplified versions of the flag this symbol may come simply outlined in white on the blue ground. This flag is mostly displayed around August, the month of the Queen Mother's birth.

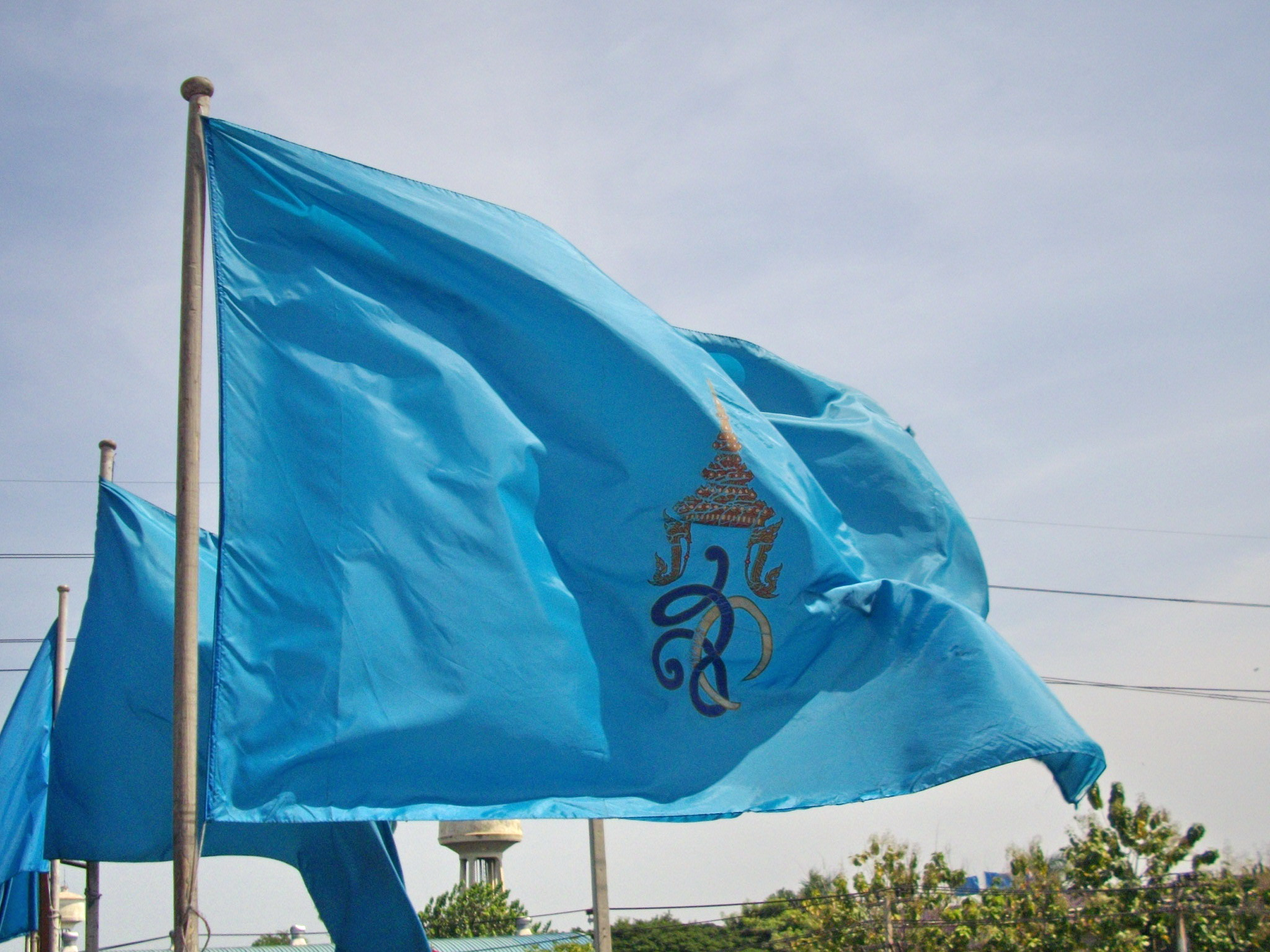
Royal flag of Queen Sirikit. The flag was blue with personal monogram in the middle.

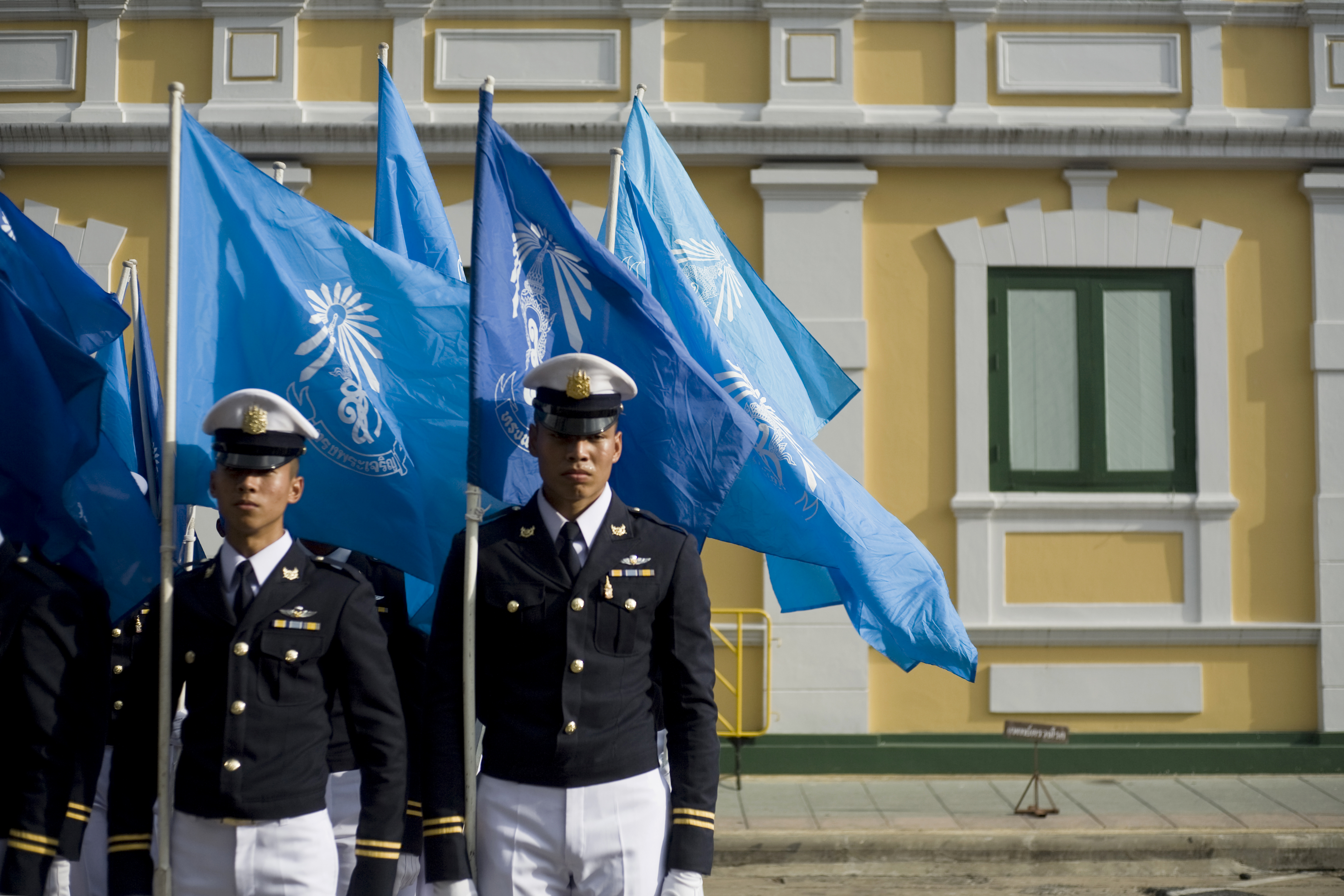
The simplified version of the royal flag of Queen Sirikit.

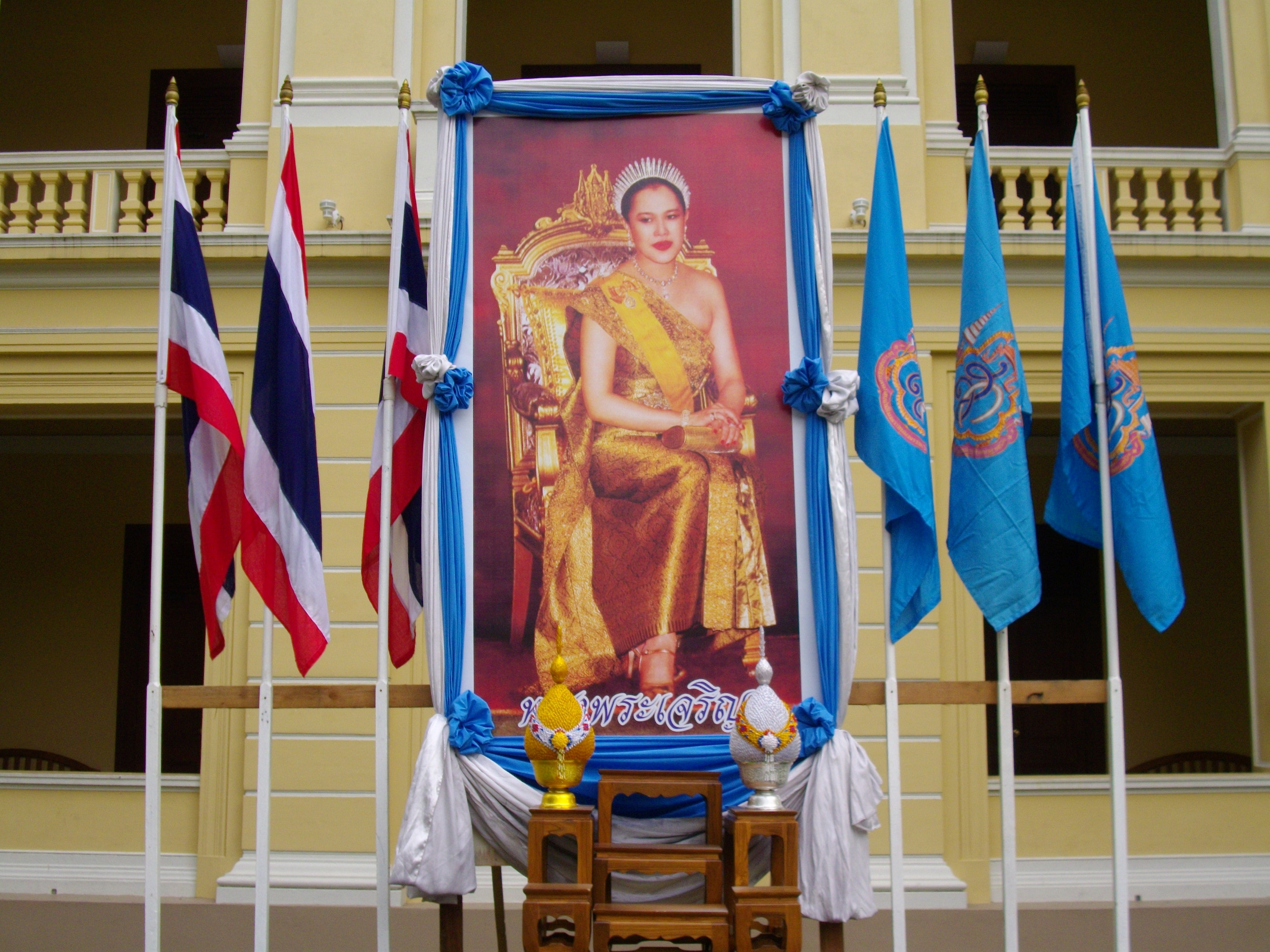
The displays of the national flag along with the Flag of the Royal Ceremonial of the Queen's 6th Cycle Birthday Anniversary.

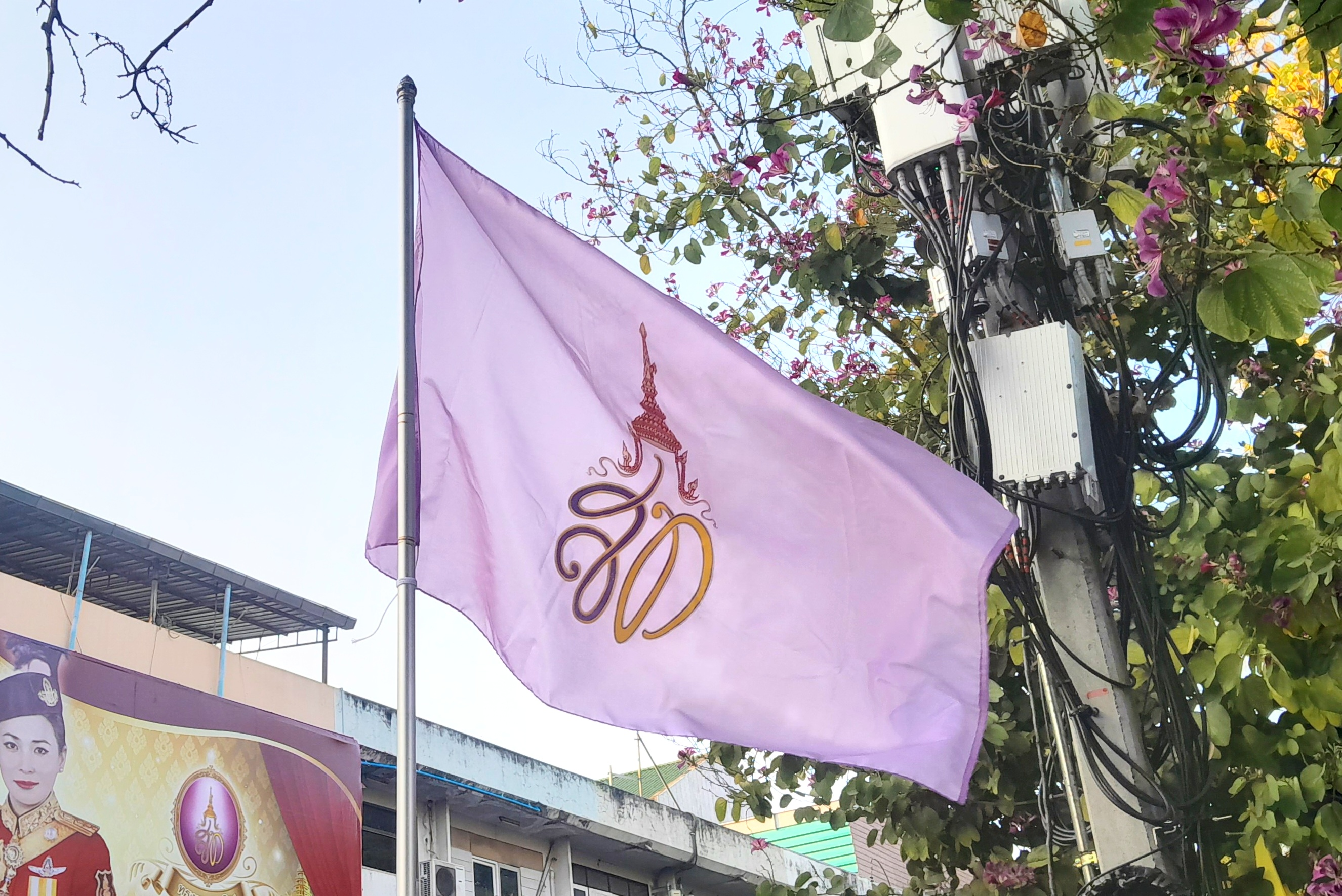
Royal flag of Queen Suthida. The flag was purple with personal monogram in the middle.

== List of royal flags ==
=== In use flags ===
Royal flag	Dates	Use	Details
	2016–	Personal flag of King Maha Vajiralongkorn	Yellow flag (the King's birthday colour), the middle the depicts the royal cypher "ว.ป.ร.", topped by the Great Crown of Victory, in between is the Thai symbol for the numeral 10, signifying his rule as Rama X.
	2019–	Personal flag of Queen Suthida	Purple flag (the Queen's birthday colour), the middle is Queen Suthida's royal cypher, topped by the Crown.
	1977–	Personal flag of Princess Maha Chakri Sirindhorn	Purple flag (the Princess' birthday colour), the middle is the royal cypher, topped by the medium crown.
	1982–	Personal flag of Princess Chulabhorn	Orange flag (the Princess' birthday colour), the middle is the royal cypher, topped by the simplified crown.
	2001–	Personal flag of Princess Ubol Ratana	Red flag (the Princess' favourite colour), the middle is the royal cypher, but not topped by the simplified crown.
	1999–	Personal flag of Princess Soamsawali	Purple flag (the Princess' birthday colour), the middle is the royal cypher, under the Buddhist/Hindu sacred sign of "Unalome".
	2019–	Personal flag of Princess Sirivannavari	Orange flag (the Princess' birthday colour), the middle is the royal cypher, topped by the simplified crown.
	2019–	Personal flag of Prince Dipangkorn Rasmijoti	Blue flag (the Prince's birthday colour), the middle is the royal cypher, topped by the simplified crown.
	1982–	Personal flag of Princess Siribha Chudabhorn	Blue flag (the Princess' birthday colour), the middle is the royal cypher, topped by the glowing tiara.
	2016–	Personal flag of Princess Aditayadhorn Kitikhun	Purple flag (the Princess' birthday colour), the middle is the royal cypher.
	2017-	Personal flag of Ariyavongsagatanana (Amborn Ambaro), The Supreme Patriarch	White flag (symbolize the pure of the Buddhism), the middle is the cypher, topped by the three-tiered umbrella.

=== Discontinued flags ===
Royal flag	Dates	Use	Details
	1946–2016	Personal flag of King Bhumibol Adulyadej	Yellow flag (the King's birthday colour), the middle the depicts the royal cypher "ภ.ป.ร.", topped by the Great Crown of Victory, in between is the Thai symbol for the numeral 9, signifying his rule as Rama IX. Sometimes still displayed.
	1950–2025	Personal flag of Queen Mother Sirikit	Blue flag (the Queen Mother's birthday colour), the middle is Queen Sirikit's royal cypher, topped by the Crown of the Great Lady.
	1904–1984	Personal flag of Rambai Barni	Square-shaped pink flag (the Queen's birthday colour), the middle is the royal cypher, topped by the crown.
	1900–1995	Personal flag of Princess Srinagarindra	Red flag (the Princess birthday colour), the middle is the royal cypher in white variation.
	1972-?	Personal flag of Maha Vajiralongkorn, the Crown Prince	Blue flag (Represent the blue blood), the middle is the royal cypher topped by the crown.
	1972–1998	Personal flag of Maha Vajiralongkorn, the Crown Prince	Yellow flag (the Prince's birthday colour), the middle is the royal cypher topped by the crown in the blue background.
	1972–1998	Personal flag of Maha Vajiralongkorn, the Crown Prince	Yellow flag (the Prince's birthday colour), the middle is the royal seal.
	1998–2016	Personal flag of Maha Vajiralongkorn, the Crown Prince	Yellow flag (the Prince's birthday colour), the middle is the royal cypher topped by the crown in the blue background. in between is the royal emblem.
	2019–2026	Personal flag of Princess Bajrakitiyabha	Orange flag (the Princess' birthday colour), the middle is the royal cypher, topped by the simplified crown.
	1925–2011	Personal flag of Princess Bejaratana Rajasuda	Pink flag (the Princess birthday colour), the middle is the royal cypher topped by the crown. in between is the Thai symbol for the numeral 6. signifying her status as the princess of Rama VI.
	1995–2008	Personal flag of Princess Galyani Vadhana	Navy-blue flag. The personal symbol of the Princess, her acronym surmounted by a simplified crown, is in the middle of the flag. Unlike the other royal flags, which have the color of the day of birth as a background, this flag was in the Princess' favourite colour.
	???	Personal flag of Princess Ubol Ratana	Red flag (the Princess' birthday colour), the middle is the royal cypher, but not topped by the simplified crown.
	1980s-1991	Personal flag of Princess Soamsawali, Royal Consort to the Crown Prince of Thailand.	Blue flag (the Princess favourite colour), the middle is the royal cypher within a 2-layer pink oval frame.
	1991-1999	Personal flag of Princess Soamsawali	Blue flag (the Princess favourite colour), the middle is the royal cypher within a 1-layer gold oval frame.
	2001–2014	Personal flag of Princess Srirasmi, Royal Consort to the Crown Prince of Thailand.	Orange flag (the Princess birthday colour), the middle is the royal cypher.
	1998-1999	Personal flag of Princess Bajrakitiyabha.	Orange flag (the Princess birthday colour), the middle is the royal cypher on the blue oval and the gold frame.
	1999–2019	Personal flag of Princess Bajrakitiyabha.	Orange flag (the Princess birthday colour), the middle is the royal cypher.
	1998-1999	Personal flag of Princess Sirivannavari.	Orange flag (the Princess birthday colour), the middle is the royal cypher on the blue oval and the gold frame.
	1999–2019	Personal flag of Princess Sirivannavari.	Orange flag (the Princess birthday colour), the middle is the royal cypher.
	2006–2019	Personal flag of Prince Dipangkorn Rasmijoti.	Blue flag (the Prince's birthday colour), the middle is the royal cypher.
	2013–2014	Personal flag of Princess Aditayadorn Kitikhun	Plain red flag.
	2014–2016	Personal flag of Princess Aditayadorn Kitikhun	Plain purple flag (the Princess birthday colour).
	1989–2013	Personal flag of Vajirañāṇasaṃvara, the Supreme Patriarch	White flag (symbolize the pure of the Buddhism), the middle is the cypher, topped by the three-tiered umbrella.

== Special commemoration flags ==
=== In use flags ===
Special commemoration flags	Use	Details	Period
	Personal flag of King Maha Vajiralongkorn	Yellow flag (the King's birthday colour), the middle depicts the Royal Emblem of the Coronation of King Rama X.	1 January 2019–31 August 2019
	Personal flag of King Maha Vajiralongkorn	Yellow flag (the King's birthday colour), the middle depicts the Royal Ceremonial Emblem of the King's 6th Cycle Birthday.	1 January 2024–31 December 2024
	Personal flag of Princess Maha Chakri Sirindhorn	Purple flag (the Princess birthday colour), the middle depicts the Royal Emblem of the 60th Anniversary of Princess Maha Chakri Sirindhorn.	1 January 2015–31 August 2015

=== Discontinued flags ===
Special commemoration flags	Use	Details	Period
	Personal flag of King Bhumibol Adulyadej	Yellow flag (the King's birthday colour), the middle depicts the Royal Emblem of the Royal Ceremonial on the 5th Cycle Birthday of the King.	1 January 1987–31 December 1987
	Personal flag of King Bhumibol Adulyadej	Yellow flag (the King's birthday colour), the middle depicts the Royal Ceremonial Emblem marking the longest reign in Thai history.	1988
	Personal flag of King Bhumibol Adulyadej	Yellow flag (the King's birthday colour), the middle depicts the Royal Ceremonial Emblem on the 50th Anniversary of the King's Accession to the Throne or the Golden Jubilee.	1996
	Personal flag of King Bhumibol Adulyadej	Yellow flag (the King's birthday colour), the middle depicts the Royal Ceremonial Emblem of the King's 6th Cycle Birthday.	1 January 1999–31 December 1999
	Personal flag of King Bhumibol Adulyadej	Yellow flag (the King's birthday colour), the middle depicts the Royal Ceremonial Emblem on the 60th Anniversary of the King's Accession to the Throne.	1 December 2005–31 December 2006
	Personal flag of King Bhumibol Adulyadej	Yellow flag (the King's birthday colour), the middle depicts the Royal Emblem in Commemoration of the Celebrations of the King's 80th Birthday.	1 January 2007–31 December 2007
	Personal flag of King Bhumibol Adulyadej	Yellow flag (the King's birthday colour), the middle depicts the Royal Emblem in Celebration of the King's 7th Cycle Birthday.	1 January 2011–31 December 2011
	Personal flag of King Bhumibol Adulyadej	Yellow flag (the King's birthday colour), the middle depicts the Royal Ceremonial Emblem on the 70th Anniversary of the King's Accession to the Throne.	9 June 2016–31 December 2017. (Display along with the Flag of the Royal Ceremonial of the Queen's 7th Cycle Birthday.) (Discontinued on 13 October 2016 after his death.)
	Personal flag of Queen Sirikit	Blue flag (the Queen's birthday colour), the middle depicts the Royal Ceremonial Emblem of the Queen's 5th Cycle Birthday.	1992
	Personal flag of Queen Sirikit	Blue flag (the Queen's birthday colour), the middle depicts the Royal Ceremonial Emblem of the Queen's 6th Cycle Birthday.	2004
	Personal flag of Queen Sirikit	Blue flag (the Queen's birthday colour), the middle depicts the Royal Emblem of the Celebrations of Queen Sirikit's 80th Birthday.	2012
	Personal flag of Queen Sirikit	Blue flag (the Queen's birthday colour), the middle depicts the Royal Ceremonial Emblem of Her Majesty the Queen's 7th Cycle Birthday Anniversary.	1 January 2016–31 December 2016. (Display along with the Flag of the Royal Ceremonial on the 70th Anniversary of the King's Accession to the Throne)
	Personal flag of Queen Mother Sirikit	Blue flag (the Queen's birthday colour), the middle depicts the Royal Emblem of the Celebrations of Queen Sirikit the Queen Mother's 90th Birthday.	1 August 2022–31 August 2022
	Personal flag of Princess Srinagarindra	White flag, the middle depicts the emblem of the 100th year celebration of Princess Srinagarindra's birth.	1 January 2000–31 December 2000
	Personal flag of Maha Vajiralongkorn, the Crown Prince	Yellow flag (the King's birthday colour), the middle depicts the Royal Emblem of the 5th Cycle Birthday Anniversary of the Prince.	2012
	Personal flag of Princess Bejaratana Rajasuda	Pink flag (the Princess birthday colour), the middle depicts the Royal Emblem of the 7th Cycle Birthday Anniversary of the Princess.	2009

== See also ==
- Monarchy of Thailand
- Royal Standard of Thailand
- List of Thai flags
- List of flags of the Royal Thai Armed Forces
