= Colors of the day in Thailand =

Colours determined by ruling planets

Figure of colors.

According to ancient customs in Thailand, there is an astrological rule (which has influence from Hindu mythology) that assigns a color to each day of the week based on the color of the God who protects the day or Navagraha. For example, the God of Sunday is Surya who has the color red. These colors of the day are traditional Thai birthday colors. As King Bhumibol and his son, Rama X were born on Mondays, Thailand is decorated with yellow on their birthdays, people in Thailand often wear clothes corresponding to the color of the day.

Day	Thai name	Transcription	Color of the day	Celestial Body	God of the day
Sunday	วันอาทิตย์	wan athít /wan ʔaː tʰít/	Red	Sun	Surya
Monday	วันจันทร์	wan chan /wan tɕan/	Yellow or Cream	Moon	Chandra
Tuesday	วันอังคาร	wan angkhan /wan ʔaŋ kʰaːn/	Pink	Mars	Mangala
Wednesday	วันพุธ	wan phút /wan pʰút/	Green	Mercury	Budha
Thursday	วันพฤหัสบดี	wan phrúehàtsàbodi /wan pʰrɯ́ʔ hàt sà bɔː diː/	Orange	Jupiter	Brihaspati
Friday	วันศุกร์	wan sùk /wan sùk/	Light Blue	Venus	Shukra
Saturday	วันเสาร์	wan sǎo /wan sǎw/	Purple	Saturn	Shani

== In other cultures ==
In cultures outside of Thailand, there is also the concept of colors of the seven days, but the colors are not fixed. There are also some cultures that represent the colors of the seven days in the spectral order of the rainbow, such as the lighting ceremony of Taipei 101.

== See also ==
- Thai solar calendar
- Royal Flags of Thailand
