= Monarchy of Thailand =

King of Thailand
- พระมหากษัตริย์ไทย
- Royal Standard

Incumbent
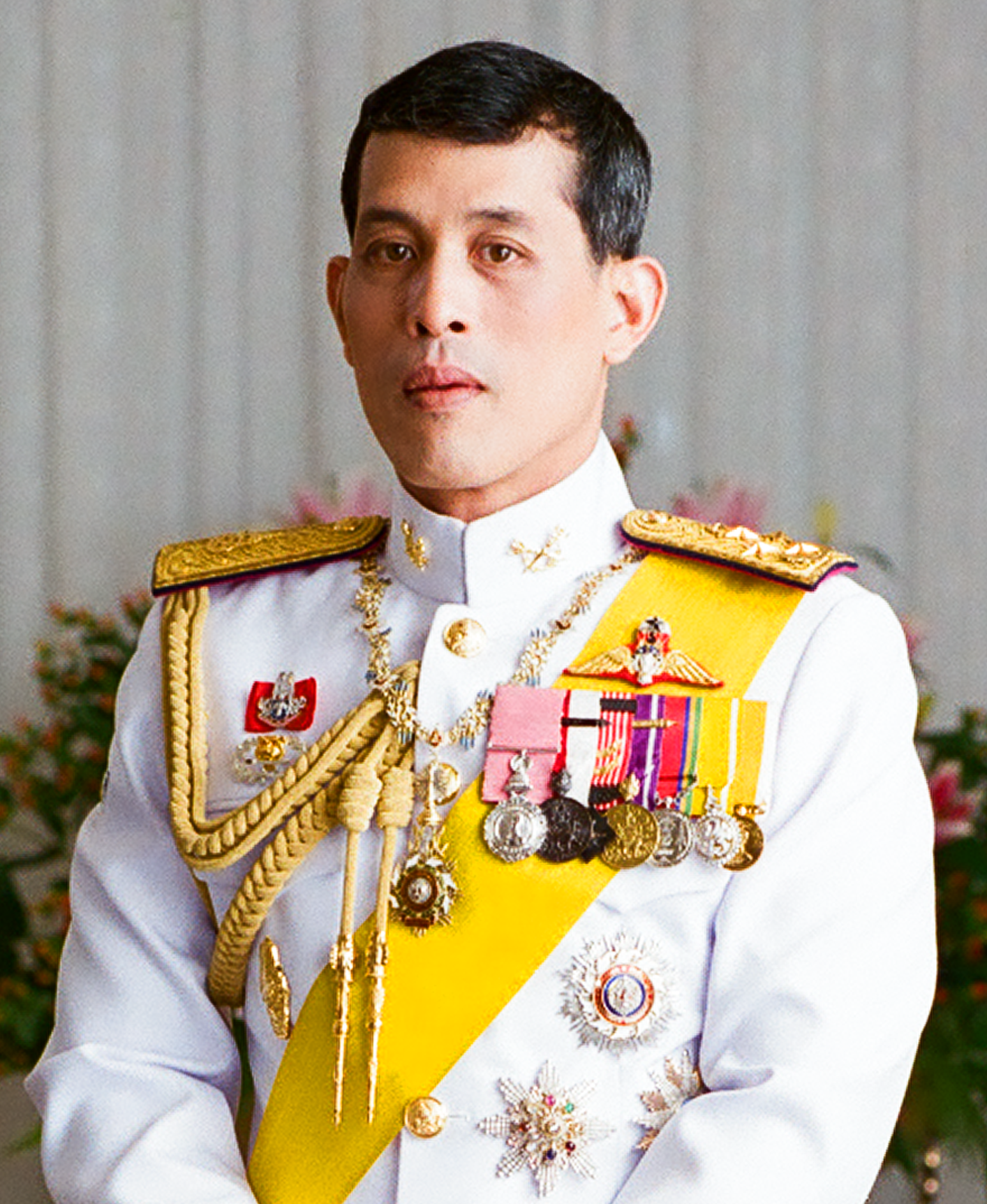
- Vajiralongkorn (Rama X) since 13 October 2016

Details
- Style: His Majesty
- Heir presumptive: Dipangkorn Rasmijoti
- First monarch: Si Inthrathit
- Formed: 1238; 788 years ago
- Residences: Grand Palace (ceremonial); Dusit Palace (residential)
- Website: royaloffice.th

The monarchy of Thailand is the constitutional form of government of Thailand (formerly Siam). The king of Thailand (Thai: พระมหากษัตริย์ไทย, RTGS: Phra Maha Kasat Thai, pronounced [pʰrá(ʔ) má.hǎː kà.sàt tʰāj], historically the king of Siam; Thai: พระเจ้ากรุงสยาม, RTGS: Phrachao Krung Sayam, pronounced [pʰrá(ʔ).tɕâːw krūŋ sà.jǎːm]) is the head of state and head of the ruling Chakri dynasty.

Although the current Chakri dynasty was founded in 1782, the existence of monarchy in Thailand is traditionally considered to have its roots in the founding of the Sukhothai Kingdom in 1238, with a brief interregnum from the death of Ekkathat to the accession of Taksin in the 18th century. The institution was transformed into a constitutional monarchy in 1932 after the bloodless Siamese Revolution of 1932. The monarchy's official ceremonial residence is the Grand Palace in Bangkok, while the private residence has been at the Dusit Palace. The king of Thailand is head of state, Highest Commander of the Royal Thai Armed Forces, adherent of Buddhism and upholder of religions.

== History ==
=== Origin ===
Thai kingship evolved through 800 years of autocracy. The first king of a unified Thailand was the founder of the Sukhothai Kingdom, King Si Inthrathit, in 1238. This early kingship is said to be based on two concepts derived from Hinduism and Theravada Buddhist beliefs. The first concept is based on the ancient Indian Kshatriya (Thai: กษัตริย์ RTGS: Kasat pronounced [kà.sàt]), or warrior-ruler, in which the king derives his powers from military might. The second is based on the Buddhist concept of Dhammaraja (Thai: ธรรมราชา RTGS: Thammaracha pronounced [tʰām.má.rāː.tɕʰāː]), Buddhism having been introduced to Thailand around the 6th century CE. The concept of the Dhammaraja (or kingship under Dharma) is that the king should rule his people justly, ethically, and in accordance with the Dharma (Buddhist teachings).

These concepts were briefly replaced in 1279, when King Ram Khamhaeng ascended the throne. Ramkhamhaeng departed from tradition and created instead a concept of "paternal rule" (Thai: พ่อปกครองลูก), in which the king governs his people as a father would govern his children. This is reinforced in the title and name of the king, as he is still known today, Pho Khun Ram Khamhaeng (Thai: พ่อขุนรามคำแหง) meaning 'Father Ruler Ram Khamhaeng'. This lasted briefly. By the end of the kingdom, the two old concepts returned as symbolized by the change in the style of the kings: "Pho" was changed to "Phaya" or Lord.

=== Kings of Ayutthaya ===
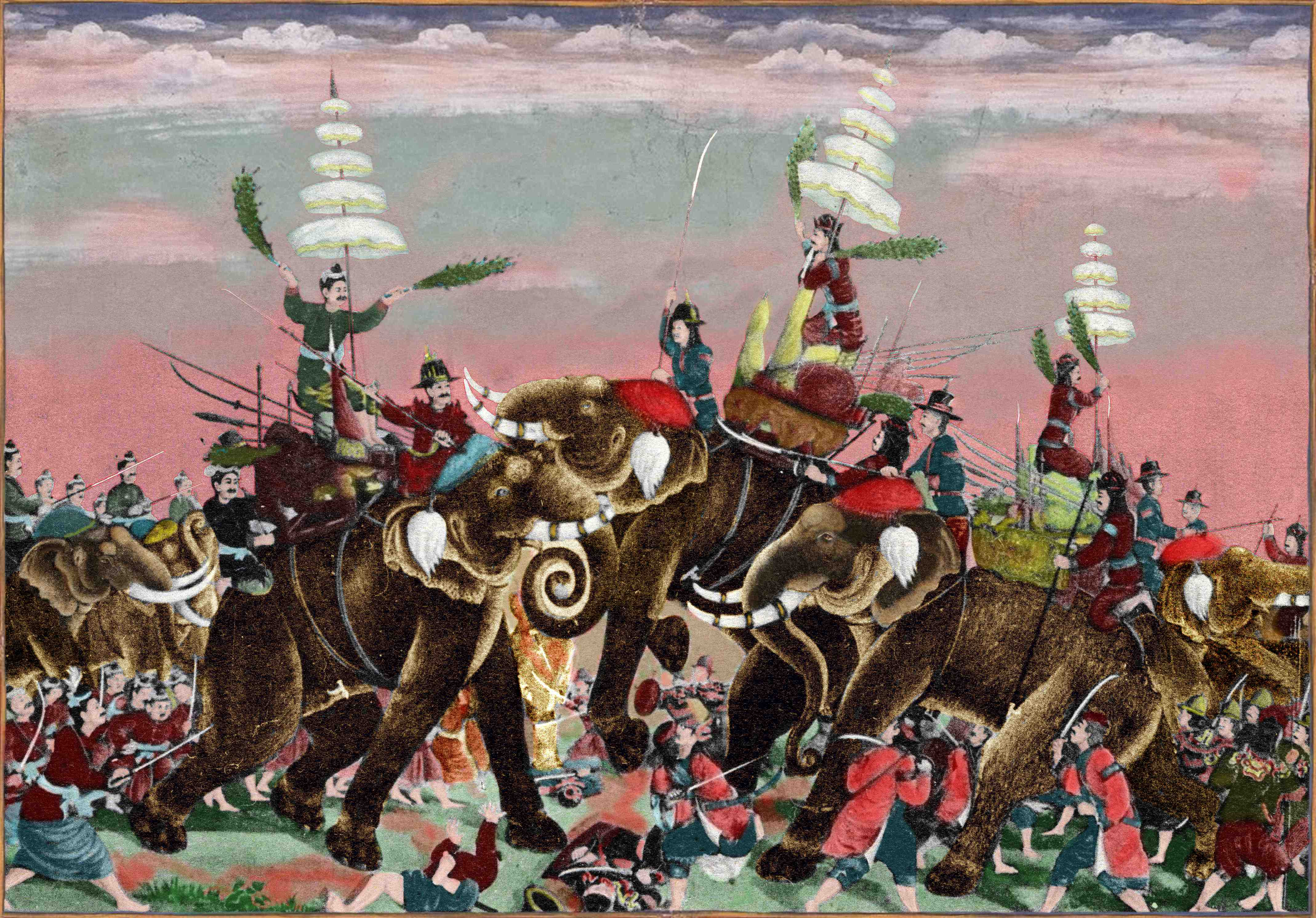
King Naresuan of Ayutthaya fought several wars against the Burmese Toungoo dynasty to preserve Siamese independence.

The Sukhothai Kingdom was supplanted by the Ayutthaya Kingdom, which was founded in 1351 by King Ramathibodhi I. During the Ayutthayan period, the concept of kingship changed. Due to ancient Khmer tradition in the region, the Hindu concept of kingship was applied to the status of the leader. Brahmins took charge in the royal coronation. The king was treated as a reincarnation of Hindu gods. Ayutthaya historical documents show the official titles of the kings in great variation: Indra, Shiva and Vishnu, or Rama. Seemingly, Rama was the most popular, as in "Ramathibodhi." However, Buddhist influence was also evident, as many times the king's title and "unofficial" name "Dhammaraja", the Pali form of the Buddhist Dharmaraja. The two former concepts were re-established, with a third, older concept taking hold. This concept was called "Devaraja" (Thai: เทวราชา) (or "divine king"), which was a concept adopted by the Khmer Empire from the Hindu-Buddhist kingdoms of Java, especially a scholar class based on Hindu Brahmins. The concept centered on the belief that the king was an incarnation (avatar) of the god Vishnu and that he was a Bodhisattva (enlightened one), therefore basing his autocratic power on his religious, moral, and royal lineage.

The king, portrayed by state interests as a semi-divine figure, then became—through a rigid cultural implementation—an object of worship and veneration to his people. From then on the monarchy was largely removed from the people and continued under a system of absolute rule. Living in palaces designed after Mount Meru ("home of the gods" in Hinduism), the kings turned themselves into a "Chakravartin", where the king became an absolute and universal lord of his realm. Kings demanded that the universe be envisioned as revolving around them, and expressed their powers through elaborate rituals and ceremonies. For four centuries these kings ruled Ayutthaya, presiding over some of the greatest period of cultural, economic, and military growth in Thai history.

==== Sakdina and Rachasap ====
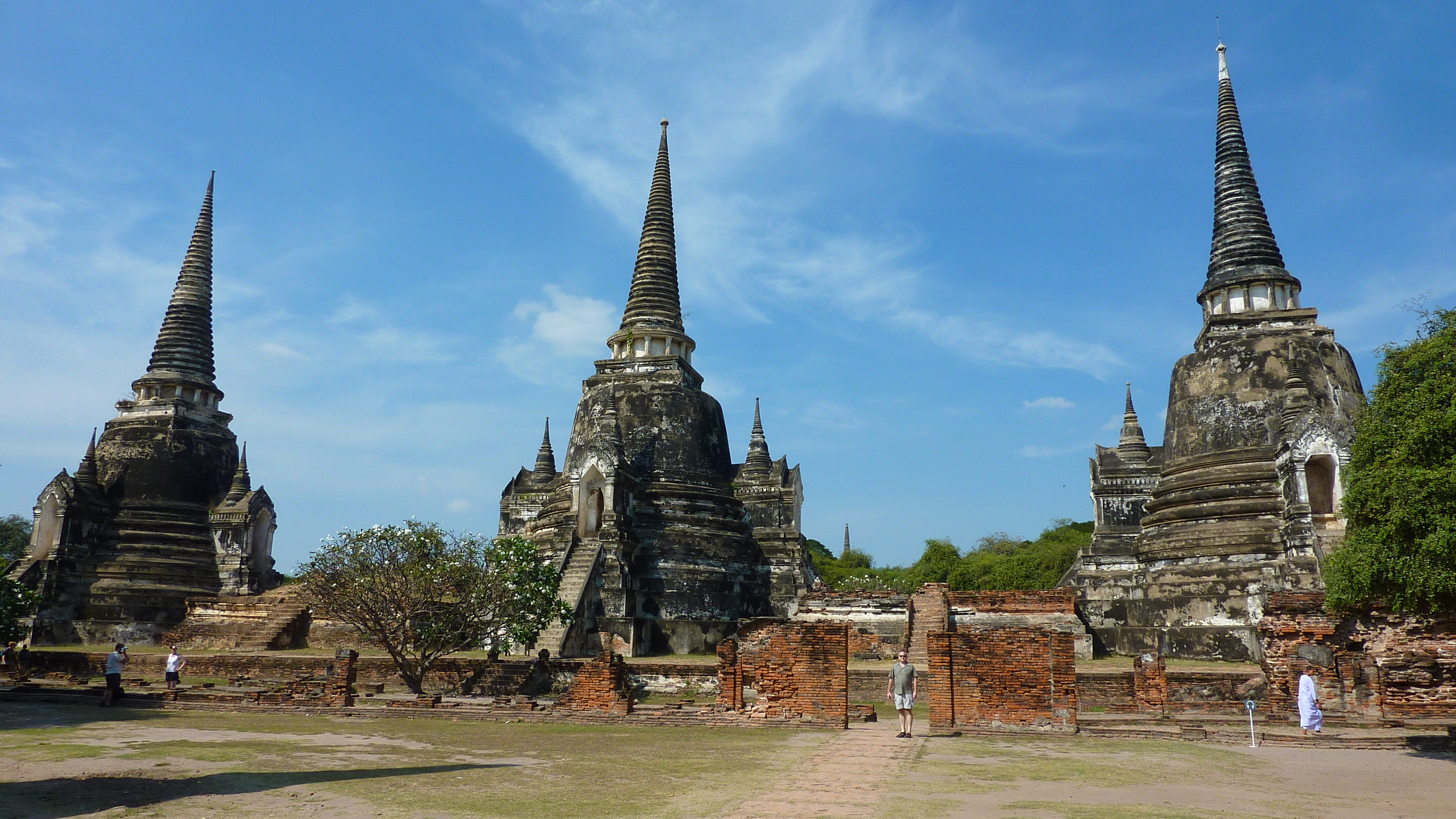
Wat Phra Si Sanphet next to the king's palace was the most sacred Ayutthayan temple.

Family tree of the Kings of Thailand

The Kings of Ayutthaya created many institutions to support their rule. Whereas feudalism developed in the European Middle Ages, Ayutthayan King Trailokanat in the 15th century instituted sakdina, a system of social hierarchy which ranked the king's subjects according to the amount of land they were entitled to, according to their rank and position.

Rachasap is required by court etiquette as an honorific register consisting of a special vocabulary used exclusively for addressing the king, or for talking about royalty.

==== Royal authority ====
The king was the established chief administrator, chief legislator, and chief judge, with all laws, orders, verdict and punishments theoretically originating from his person. The king's sovereignty was reflected in the titles "Lord of the Land" (พระเจ้าแผ่นดิน Phra Chao Phaen Din) and "Lord of Life" (เจ้าชีวิต Chao Chiwit). The king's powers and titles were seen by foreign observers as proof that the king was an absolute monarch in the European sense. However, in Siamese tradition, the duty and responsibility of the king was seen as developed from the ancient Indian theories of royal authority, which resemble enlightened absolutism, although the emphasis is not on rationality but on Dhamma. This was disrupted in 1767, when Thai digests of the dhammasāt (ธรรมศาสตร์) were lost when a Burmese army under the Konbaung dynasty invaded, sacked and burned the city of Ayutthaya.

=== Kingdom restored ===
An interlude filled by a short civil war was ended when Taksin restored the country under what has been called the Thonburi Kingdom. Kingship during the Thonburi period saw the adoption of the 'personal kingship' system that was previously administered under Naresuan (but abandoned after his death). Taksin treated the concept of kingship by abandoning the shroud of mysticism usually adopted by many Ayutthayan monarchs; he often revealed himself to the common folk by partaking in public activities and traditional festivities. He did little to emphasize his new capital, Thonburi, as the spiritual successor to Ayutthaya. He also emphasized the building of moats and defensive walls in Thonburi.

=== Chakri kings ===
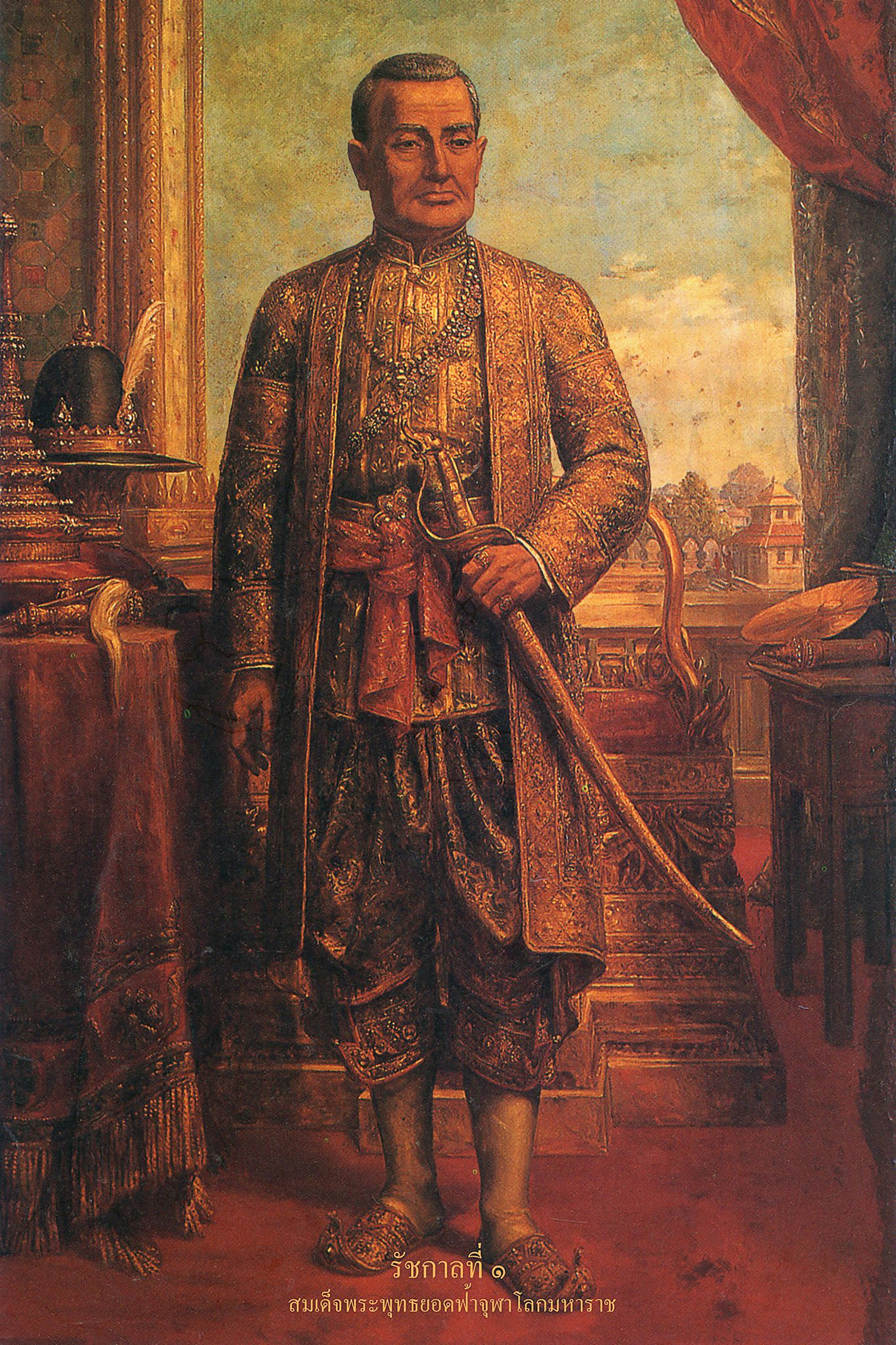
Thongduang, later King Rama I of Siam, founded the Chakri dynasty in 1782.

In 1782, Phutthayotfa Chulalok (Rama I) ascended the throne and moved the capital from the Thonburi side to the (Krung Thep) Bangkok side of the Chao Phraya River. There he established the House of Chakri, the current ruling dynasty of Thailand. (This first reign was later designated as that of Rama I in the list of Rama Kings of Thailand.) He also established the office of Supreme Patriarch as the head of the Sangha, the order of Buddhist monks.

During the Rattanakosin period the Chakri kings tried to continue the concepts of Ayutthayan kingship once again emphasizing the connection between the sovereign and his subjects. On the other hand, they continued to not relinquish any authority of the throne. Kings Phutthaloetla Naphalai (Rama II) and Nangklao (Rama III) created a semblance of a modern administration by creating a supreme council and appointing chief officers to help with the running of the government.

Mongkut (Rama IV) marked a significant break in tradition when he spent the first 27 years of his adult life as a Buddhist monk during which time he became proficient in the English language, before ascending the throne. As king, he continued the appointment of officers to his supreme council, the most notable being Somdet Chao Phraya Prayurawongse and Si Suriyawongse, both of whom acted as Chief Ministers for King Mongkut (and the latter as regent, from the king's death in 1868 until 1873).

Chulalongkorn (Rama V) ascended the throne as a minor at age 15 in 1868, and assumed full duties on 16 November 1873. As a prince, he had been tutored in Western traditions by the governess, Anna Leonowens. (Note: This tutelage has been the source for several fictionalised accounts in the media, most notably the films The King and I (1956) and Anna and the King (1999), both of which have been banned in Thailand as being disrespectful to the king.) Intent on reforming the monarchy along Western lines, during his minority he traveled extensively to observe western administrative methods. He transformed the monarchy along Western lines of an "enlightened ruler". He abolished the practice of prostration in front of the monarch, and repealed many laws concerning the relationship between the monarch and his people, while continuing many of the ancient aspects and rituals of the old kingship. In 1874, he created a privy council copied from the European tradition, to help him rule his Kingdom. During his reign Siam was pressured to relinquish control of its old tributaries of Laos and northern Malaya to Western powers, Siam itself narrowly avoided becoming a colony. In 1905, 37 years after his coronation, Chulalongkorn ended slavery with the Slave Abolition Act. In 1867 slaves accounted for one-third of the Siamese population.

His son, Vajiravudh (Rama VI), ascended to the throne in 1910 and continued his father's zeal for reform to bring the monarchy into the 20th century. The perceived slow pace of reform resulted in the Palace Revolt of 1912. In 1914, Vajiravudh determined that the act providing for invoking martial law, first promulgated by his father in 1907, was not consistent with modern laws of war, nor convenient for the preservation of the security of the state, so it was amended to a more modern form that, with minor amendments, continued in force through subsequent changes in government.

Prajadhipok (Rama VII) succeeded his brother in 1925. The Eton and Sandhurst educated monarch created a council similar to a cabinet, where the most important government officials could meet to decide state affairs. This advisory and legislative council, styled the Supreme Council of State of Siam (Thai: อภิรัฐมนตรีสภา) was founded on 28 November 1925 and existed until 1932.

=== Constitutional monarchy ===
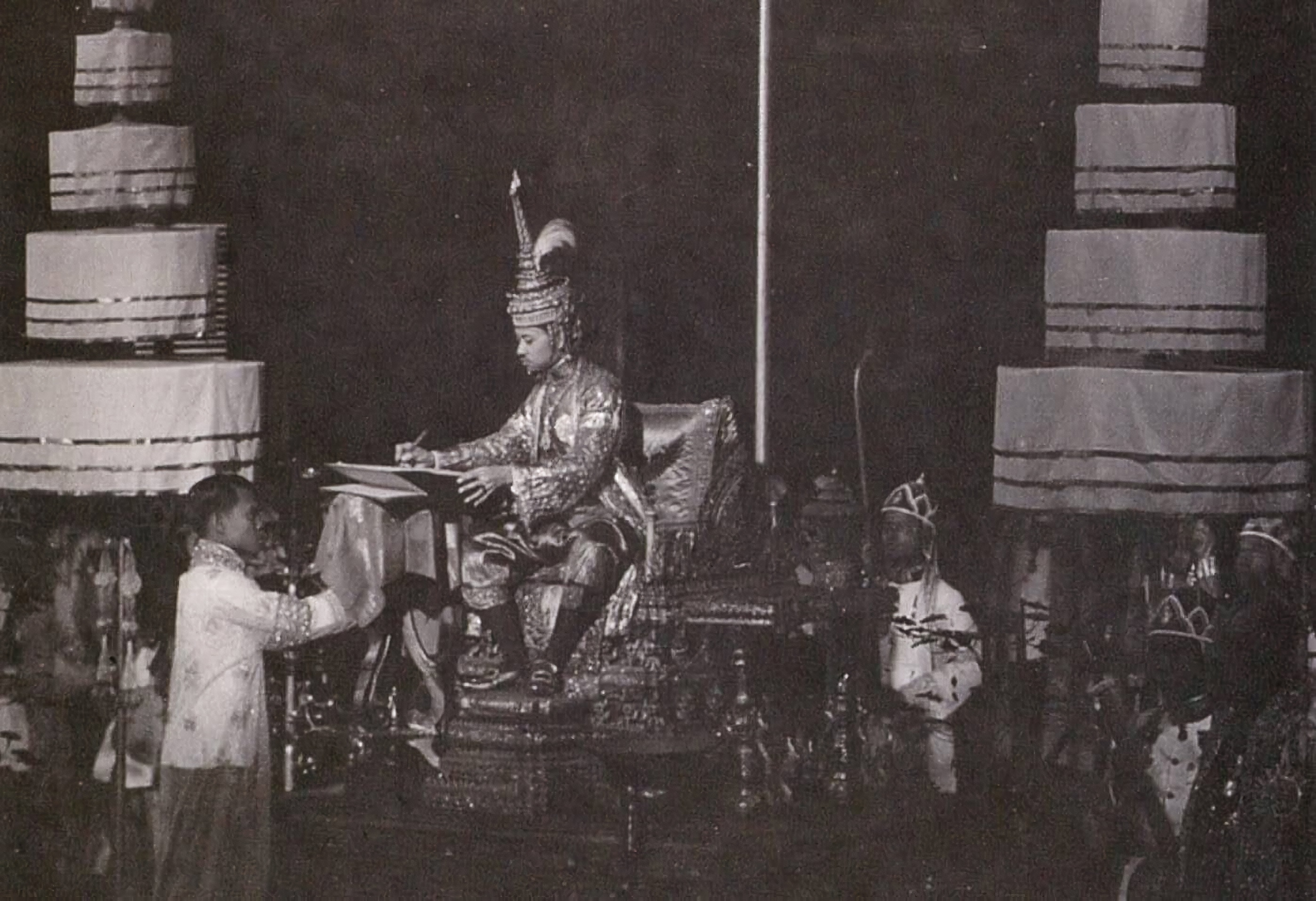
King Prajadhipok signing the Constitution of Siam, 10 December 1932.

In June 1932, a group of foreign-educated students and military men called "the promoters" carried out a bloodless revolution, seized power and demanded that King Prajadhipok grant the people of Siam a constitution. The king agreed and in December 1932 the people were granted a constitution, ending 150 years of absolute Chakri rule. From then on the role of the monarch was relegated to that of a symbolic head of state. His powers from then on were exercised by a prime minister and the national assembly.

In 1935 Prajadhipok (Rama VII) abdicated the throne, following disagreements with the government. He lived in exile in the United Kingdom until his death in 1941. The king was replaced by his young nephew Ananda Mahidol (Rama VIII). The new king was 10 years old and was living abroad in Switzerland. A council of regents was appointed in his place. During this period the roles and powers of the king were entirely usurped by the fascist government of Plaek Phibunsongkhram, who changed the name of the kingdom from Siam to Thailand, and aligned it on the side of the Axis powers in the Pacific theatre of World War II. By the end of the war Phibunsongkhram was removed and the young king returned. The Free Thai movement provided resistance against Japan during the war and helped rehabilitate Thailand after the war.

After Rama VIII's sudden death from a bullet wound in 1946, Bhumibol Adulyadej (Rama IX), aged 19 years old, became the new monarch. In establishing his rule, the king was aided by the efforts of the US government, who used the monarchy as a bulwark against communist gains in Southeast Asia.

King Bhumibol was one of the world's longest-reigning monarchs at the time of his death on 13 October 2016, at the age of 88, having reigned for 70 years and 126 days.

=== Contemporary monarchy ===
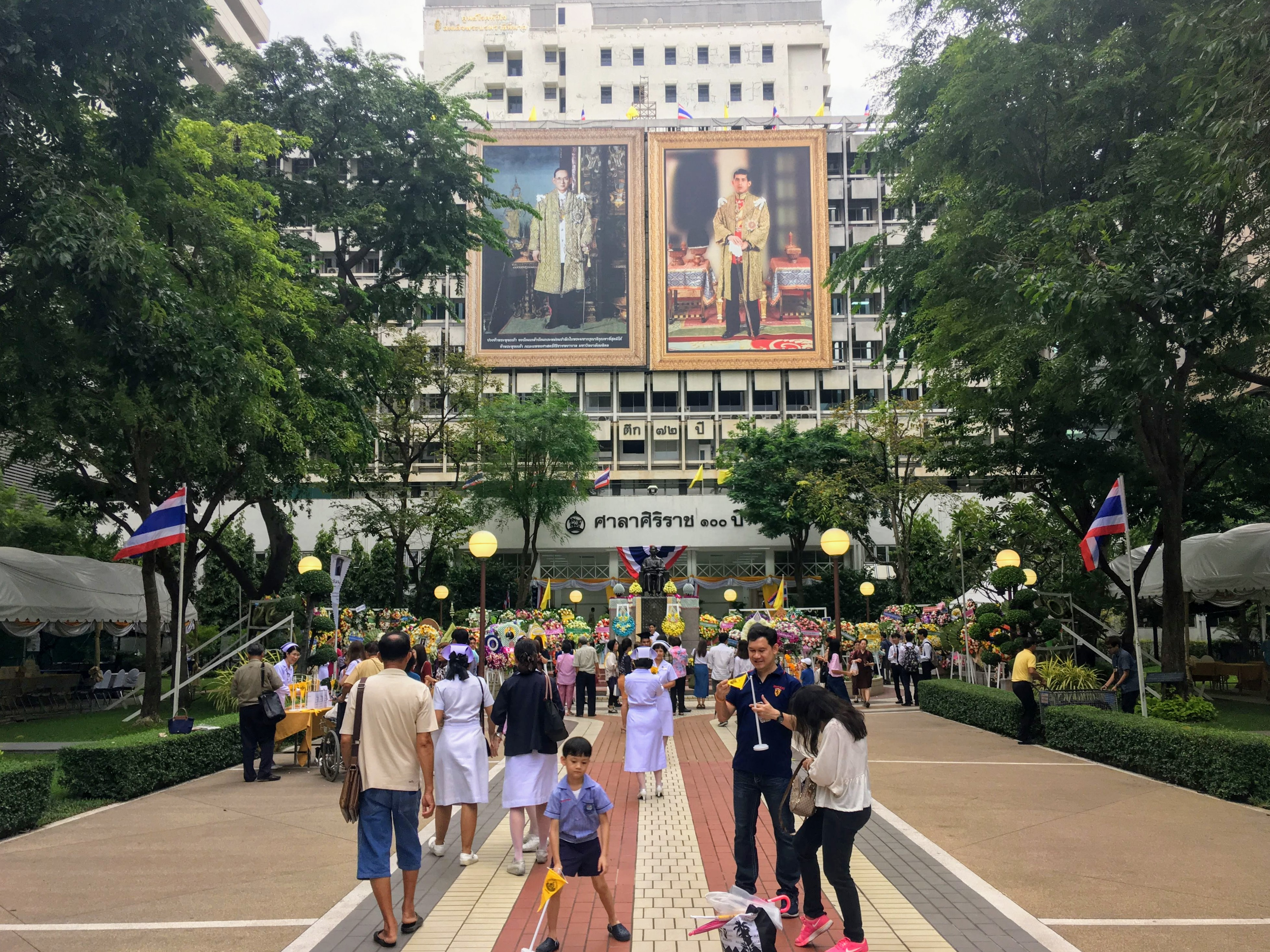
The king's image appears in every town and in many prominent locations

Since 2000, the role of the Thai monarchy has been increasingly challenged by scholars, students, media, observers and traditionalists, and as pro-democracy interests began to express their speech. Many deemed that a series of laws and measures relating to lèse majesté in Thailand are hindrances to freedom of expression. Dozens of arrests, hundreds of criminal investigations and multiple imprisonments have been made based on these laws. King Bhumibol Adulyadej's speech in his 2005 national birthday broadcast could have been interpreted as a suggestion that he welcomed criticism.

The lèse-majesté law is part of Thailand's criminal-law code and has been described as the "world's harshest lèse majesté law" and "possibly the strictest criminal-defamation law anywhere". Political scientist Giles Ungpakorn noted that "the lèse-majesté laws are not really designed to protect the institution of the monarchy. In the past, the laws have been used to protect governments and to shield military coups from lawful criticism. This whole [royal] image is created to bolster a conservative elite well beyond the walls of the palace." The Thai activist and magazine editor Somyot Prueksakasemsuk, who was sentenced to eleven years' imprisonment for a violation of lèse-majesté laws in 2013, is a designated prisoner of conscience by Amnesty International.

The king is assisted in his work and duties by the Private Secretary to the King of Thailand and the Privy Council of Thailand, in consultation with the head of the cabinet, the Prime Minister. In accordance with the country's constitution, the king is no longer the originator of all laws in the kingdom; that prerogative is entrusted to the National Assembly of Thailand. All bills passed by the legislature, however, require his royal assent to become law. The monarchy's household and finances are managed by the Bureau of the Royal Household and the Crown Property Bureau respectively, these agencies are not considered part of the Thai government and all personnel are appointed by the king.

The junta that took power in 2014 was aggressive in jailing critics of the monarchy. In 2015, it spent US$540 million, more than the budget of the Ministry of Foreign Affairs, on a promotional campaign called "Worship, protect and uphold the monarchy." The campaign includes television commercials, seminars in schools and prisons, singing contests, and competitions to write stories and films praising the king. "This is not propaganda," Prayut Chan-o-cha, the leader of the junta, said. "The youth must be educated on what the king has done."

In its fiscal year (FY) 2016 budget, the ruling military government has increased its expenditure for "upholding, protecting and preserving the monarchy" to 18 billion baht (US$514 million), an increase of 28 per cent for this budget line item since 2014 when it took power. Budget allocations to support the monarchy in FY2020 amount to 29.728 billion baht, or 0.93% of the total budget.

== Royal regalia ==
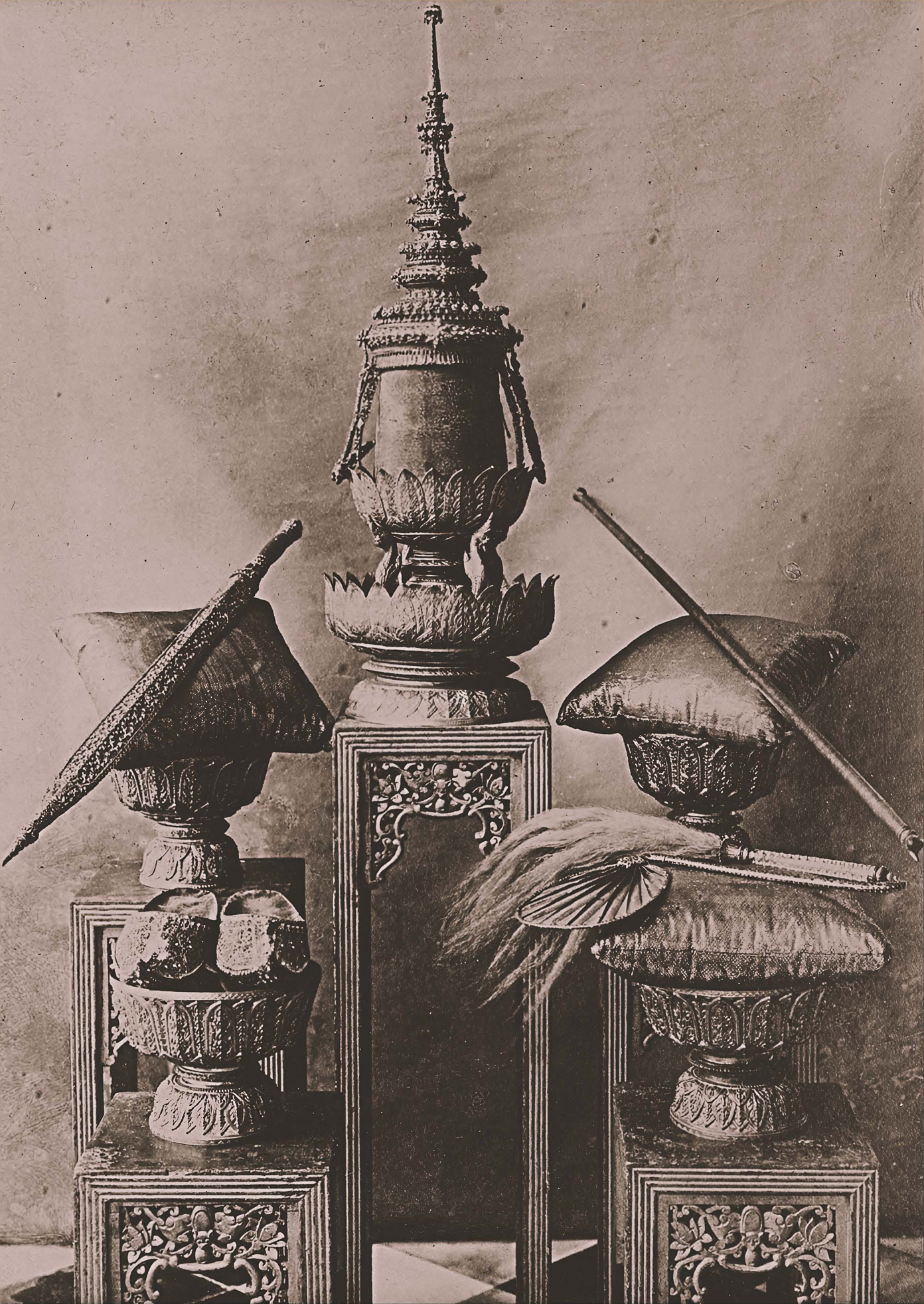
The royal regalia of Thailand consists of five principal items.

The present set of the royal regalia of Thailand (Thai: เครื่องราชกกุธภัณฑ์, RTGS: Khrueang Raja Kakudhabhand) together with the royal utensils, was created mostly during the reigns of King Rama I and King Rama IV, after the previous set was lost during the sack of Ayutthaya by the Burmese in 1767. The regalia are used mainly during the king's coronation ceremony at the beginning of each reign. The regalia are presently on display in the museum of the Grand Palace in Bangkok.

- Royal Nine-Tiered Umbrella (Phra Maha Swetachatra; พระมหาเศวตฉัตร) – the most important regalia. Currently there are seven, distributed among various palaces.
- Great Crown of Victory (Phra Maha Phichai Mongkut; พระมหาพิชัยมงกุฎ) – the official headgear.
- Sword of Victory (Phra Saeng Khan Chai Si; พระแสงขรรค์ชัยศรี) – found at Tonlé Sap in 1784; the sword represents military power.
- Royal Staff (Than Phra Kon; ธารพระกร) – a symbol of justice.
- Royal fan and fly-whisk (Walawijani; วาลวีชนี) – the royal fan is made of gold, and the fly-whisk is made from the tail of a white elephant.
- Royal slippers (Chalong Phra Bat; ฉลองพระบาท) – official footwear made of gold.

The Thai royal utensils (Phra Khattiya Rajuprapoke; พระขัตติยราชูปโภค) are also for the personal use of the monarch, comprising:

- the betel set
- a water urn
- a libation vessel
- a receptacle

These objects are traditionally placed on either side of the king's throne or seat during royal ceremonies.

=== Other symbols of kingship ===
- Royal white elephant – usually one representing each reign; the current one resides at Dusit Zoo, and the king also has 10 others.
- Royal Garuda – emblem of the king and of Thailand.
- Royal Standard of Thailand – official standard of the king.
- Royal flags – personal flags of the king and the royal family.
- Sansoen Phra Barami – the royal anthem.
- Traditional Band of the Royal Family of Thailand – a traditional marching band that uses Thai instruments; it accompanies the royal family and performs at ceremonies presided over by a member of the royal family.

== Royal ceremonies ==
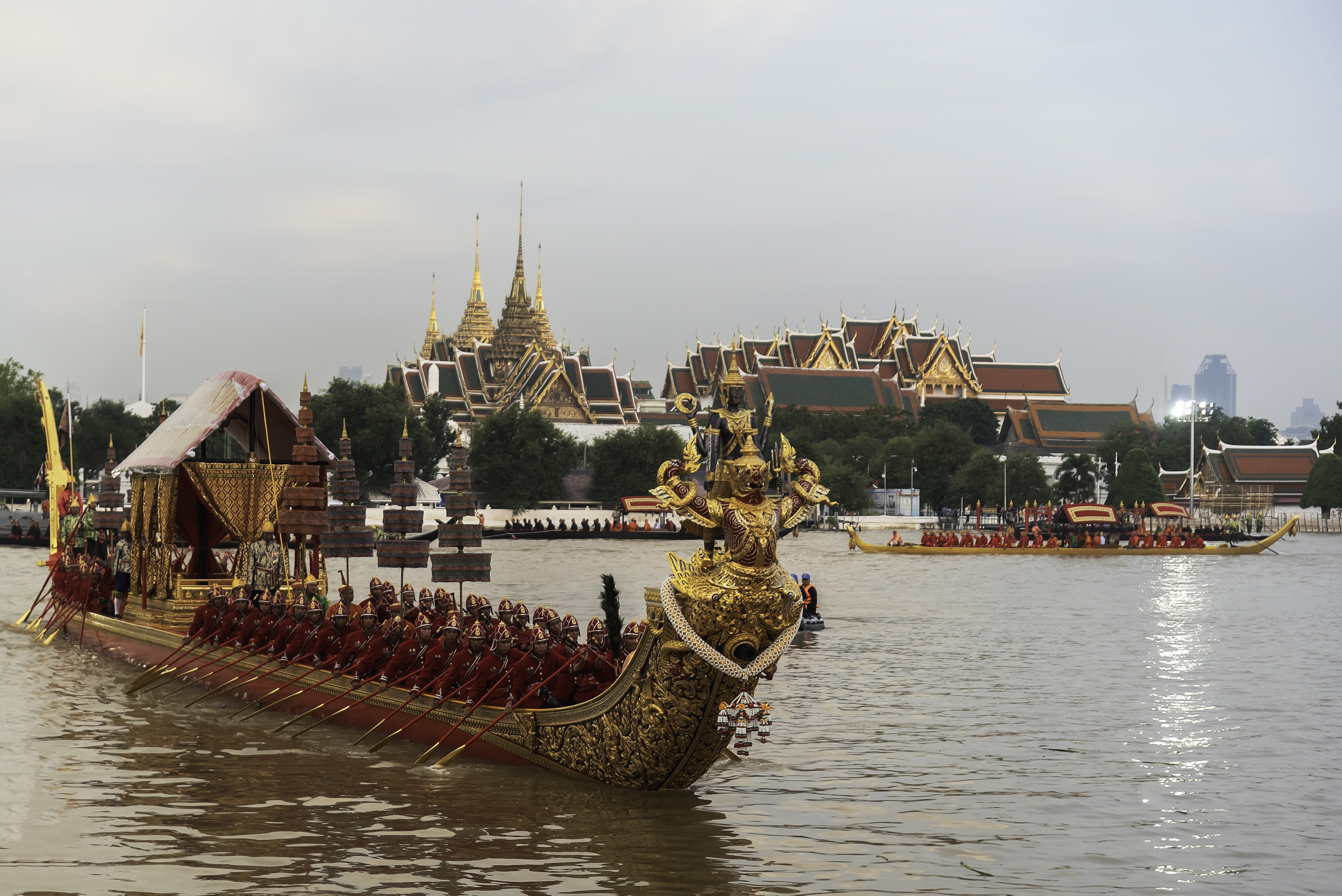
Royal Barge Procession rehearsal at Grand Palace, 2024

The king and other members of the royal family carry out many royal ceremonies annually, some dating from the 13th century.

- Royal coronation ceremony
- Royal Barge Procession
- The Changing of the Robes of the Emerald Buddha
- Trooping the Colours and Armed Forces Pledge of Loyalty
- Military Colours Consecration and Pledge Taking Ceremony
- Oath of Allegiance Ceremony
- Speech from the Throne to the National Assembly of Thailand
- Royal Funeral Ceremony

== Royal orders and decorations ==
The king is sovereign of several Royal Orders and Decorations, the prerogative to appoint and remove any persons from these orders are at the king's discretion. However, sometimes recommendations are made by the Cabinet of Thailand and the Prime Minister. There are twelve Royal Orders and some of these have separate classes.

- The Most Auspicious Order of the Rajamitrabhorn: Established on 11 June 1962 by King Rama IX to be bestowed upon foreign heads of state.
- The Most Illustrious Order of the Royal House of Chakri: Established in 1882 by King Rama V of the Kingdom of Siam (now Thailand) to commemorate the Bangkok Centennial.
- The Ancient and Auspicious Order of the Nine Gems: Established in 1851 by King Rama IV of the Kingdom of Siam (now Thailand). The order is bestowed upon the members of the Thai royal family and distinguished high-ranking officials who have given service to the kingdom and who are Buddhist.
- The Most Illustrious Order of Chula Chom Klao: Established on 16 November 1873 by King Rama V of The Kingdom of Siam (now Thailand) to commemorate the 90th Jubilee of the Chakri dynasty, and bears his name.
- The Ratana Varabhorn Order of Merit: Established on 1 August 1911 by King Rama VI of The Kingdom of Siam (now Thailand) to reward personal service to the sovereign.
- The Honourable Order of Rama: Established on 22 July 1918 (B.E. 2461) by King Rama VI of the Kingdom of Siam (now Thailand), to be bestowed onto those who have rendered special military services either in peace or in wartime.
- The Most Exalted Order of the White Elephant: Established in 1861 by King Rama IV of the Kingdom of Siam. Along with the Order of the Crown of Thailand, it is regularly awarded to government officials for each five years of service, making it Thailand's most-awarded order.
- The Most Noble Order of the Crown of Thailand: Established in 1869 by King Rama V of The Kingdom of Siam (now Thailand) for Thais, the royal family, governmental employees, and foreign dignitaries for their outstanding services to the Kingdom of Thailand.
- The Most Admirable Order of the Direkgunabhorn: Established by King Rama IX on 22 July 1991 (B.E.2534) to be bestowed upon those who have rendered devotional services to the Kingdom of Thailand.
- The Vallabhabhorn Order: Established on 22 March 1919 (B.E. 2461) by King Rama VI of The Kingdom of Siam (now Thailand).
- The Order of Ramkeerati: Established on 26 November 1987 (B.E. 2530) by King Rama IX of Thailand to be bestowed onto those who have rendered constant service and support to Boy Scout activities for at least five consecutive years.
- The Vajira Mala Order: Established on 28 May 1911 (B.E. 2454) by King Rama VI of the Kingdom of Siam (now Thailand).

== See also ==
- Succession to the Thai throne
- List of Thai monarchs
- Network monarchy
- Rajabhakti Park
- Sacred king
- King's Cup Sepaktakraw World Championship

== Bibliography ==
- The Constitution of the Kingdom of Thailand (2007) – Wikisource.
- Aryan, Gothan (15 – 16 September 2004), Thai Monarchy, International Institute for Democracy and Electoral Assistance, Retrieved on 5 July 2006, presented in Kathmandu, Nepal.
- Kullada Kesboonchoo Mead, The Rise and Decline of Thai Absolutism, RoutledgeCurzon, 2004.
