= Coronation of the Thai monarch =

Formal investiture and crowning ceremony

The coronation of the Thai monarch is a ceremony in which the monarch of Thailand is formally consecrated by anointment and crowning. The ceremony is divided into two main events: the coronation rites and the celebration of the Assumption of the Residence. The coronation rites are a blend of Hindu and Buddhist traditions dating back several centuries. The rites included the purification bath of the king, the anointing of the king (based on the ancient ritual of Abhisheka), the crowning of the king, and the investiture of the royal regalia, the royal utensils, and the royal weapons of sovereignty. The Assumption of the Residence is a private housewarming celebration by members of the royal family at the Grand Palace.

Historically, the coronation usually took place as soon as possible after the death of the previous monarch. This followed the custom that an unconsecrated king cannot bear certain regalia nor carry out any religious functions. However, in the last century this tradition has been replaced by a mourning period of about a year after the succession as their powers and legitimacy are already guaranteed by the constitution. The most recent coronation of Vajiralongkorn was held on 4 May 2019.

== Symbolism ==
The Thai language term for the coronation is Rachaphisek (ราชาภิเษก) or Rajyabhisheka (राज्याभिषेक), a Vedic term for an anointment (see Abhisheka) of a monarch. The term preserves the fact that the anointment was once the most essential component of the ceremony. Today, however, the Thai coronation ceremony incorporates many rites including the anointment, the enthronement, the crowning, and the investiture of the monarch.

The succession of a Thai king is not automatic, and was not formally codified until the 1924 Palace Law of Succession. Prior to this, the right of succession was based on many factors and was not always natural. Usurpation and violence were commonly employed to obtain the throne. As a result, the rite of coronation is important in legalising and legitimising the claimant's accession to kingship.

Ancient custom dictates that the heir to the last king rule only as a regent and not as a king until he is officially consecrated. An unconsecrated king is not considered qualified to carry out the divine and priestly function of a Devarāja (or God-king). Until the coronation rites are completed the new king must exclude the prefix Phrabat (พระบาท) from his royal title, he cannot enact a royal command, nor sit under the nine-tiered umbrella (he must make do with only seven tiers). As a result, it was customary for a king to go through the coronation ceremonies as soon as he had succeeded to the throne.

== History ==
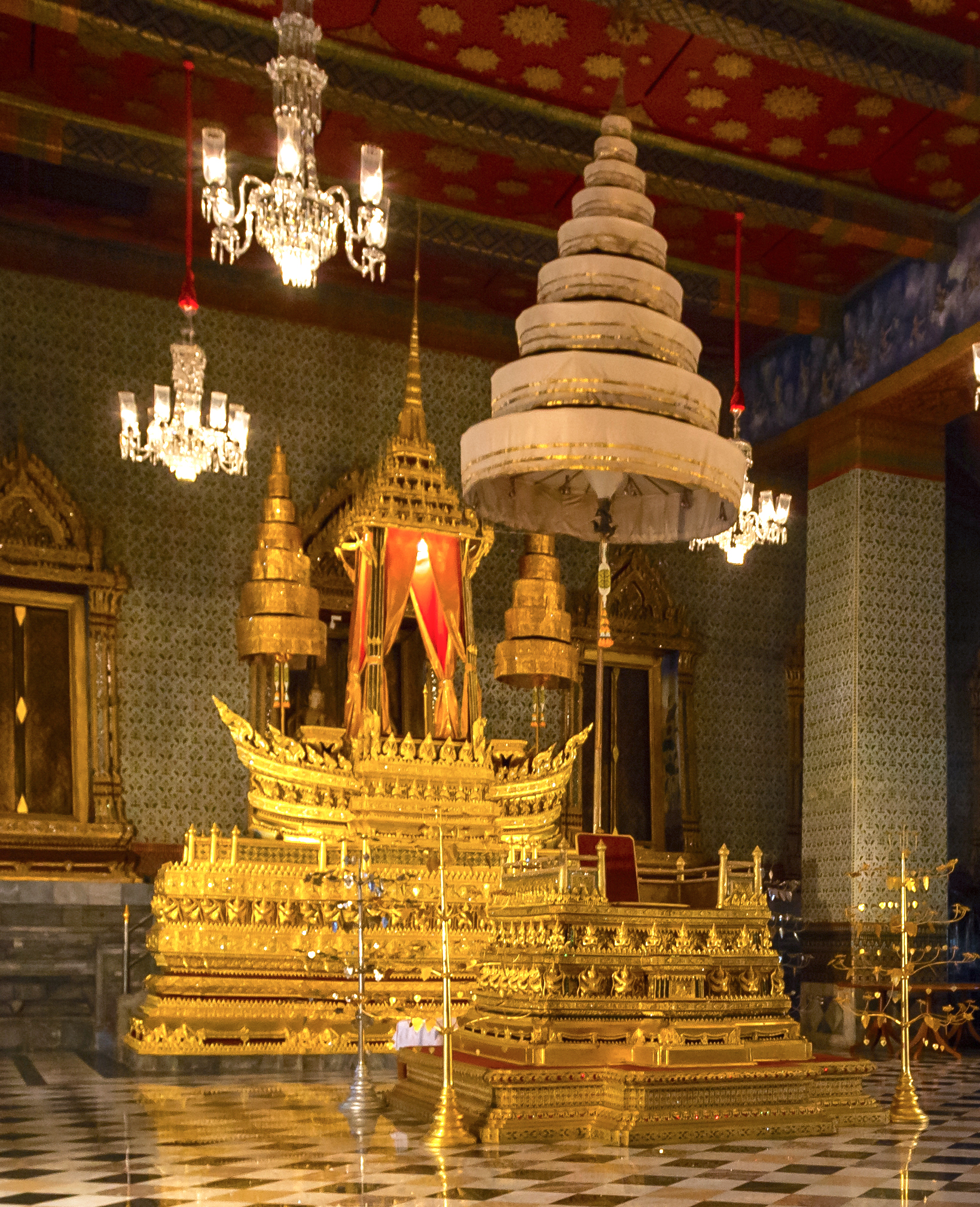
The Royal Nine-Tiered Umbrella over the throne inside the Amarin Winitchai throne hall, Grand Palace. The umbrella is an ancient symbol of kingship dating back to ancient India.

=== Ancient ceremony ===
The earliest forms of coronation in Southeast Asia were derived from those of ancient India. The present Thai coronation ceremony is a blend of Hindu and Buddhist traditions, which were transferred to the Initial states of Thailand from three different sources: the Hindu civilisations of Srivijaya from the 8th to 12th centuries; the Khmer Empire from the 9th to the mid-14th century; and the Mon Buddhist Thaton Kingdom from the 3rd century BC to the 11th century.

The Sukhothai Kingdom (13th century to 15th century), which seceded from the Khmer Empire in 1238, mentioned the process of anointment (Abhisheka) of their first monarchs, explaining that Si Inthrathit (then titled Pho Khun Bang Klang Hao) was anointed by Pha Mueang, who had himself had been anointed earlier by Indravarman II, the Khmer king.

Despite the growth of Buddhism as the main religion of the Thai kingdoms, the existence of Hinduism and the exalted role of the Brahmin caste was not diminished. Although the kings were Buddhists they surrounded themselves with the accoutrements of Khmer royalty, including the services of court Brahmins. Buddhism was considered the religion of the people, while Hinduism (in particular Shaivism) was suitable only for royalty. However, the king must defend both.

=== Ayutthaya Kingdom ===
The Sukhothai state was absorbed into the Ayutthaya Kingdom (14th century to 1767) around the 15th century. During this period the coronation of the kings of Ayutthaya was sometimes termed an Indraphisek (อินทราภิเษก) to emphasize the religious aspects of the anointment, where the god Indra was invited to manifest into the person of the king. This ceremony was undoubtedly Hindu and was performed by the court Brahmins. The ceremony also included elements of a Rajasuya. After the anointment, the chief nobles would then present the king with the different elements of his realm, namely the people, the capital city, the troops, the boats, the paddy fields and the treasury. The term Abhisheka itself was first used in the Royal Chronicle in 1480. The ceremony was supposedly held over twenty-one days, excluding a month of theatrical performances, which showed its importance.

When the capital city was sacked in 1767 by the Burmese troops of the Konbaung dynasty in the war of 1765, most of the records about royal ceremonies were destroyed. The successive Thonburi Kingdom (1768–1782) had little time for royal ceremony, and its only monarch, King Taksin, never had a coronation ceremony. Nevertheless, the king tried to restore some of the old rites when he invited some Brahmins from Nakhon Si Thammarat to his court.

=== Early Rattanakosin ===
When King Phutthayotfa Chulalok (Rama I) established the Rattanakosin Kingdom with Bangkok as the capital in 1782, he performed a provisional coronation ceremony, often referred to in historical records as a Prapdaphisek (ปราบดาภิเษก). This was described as the anointment of someone who had obtained power successfully by force. The King was intent on recovering the lost royal traditions of the Ayutthaya Kingdom. A royal decree about royal ceremonies in 1782 laid out how the King wished things to be done: "His Majesty wishes that things be carried out as in [the time of] King Borommakot, and not like Phraya Taksin." Under the stewardship of Chao Phraya Bibidhabijai (เจ้าพระยาเพชรพิชัย), a former official of the King of Ayutthaya, a committee of officials and monks created a manual of the royal ceremonies of the court, including the coronation ceremony. At the same time, he ordered the creation of a new set of the royal regalia and utensils. In 1785, after the construction of the Grand Palace was finished, a second full coronation ceremony was completed in accordance with tradition. It is on this ceremony that all subsequent coronations are modelled. The king also established the Devasathan or the Brahman temple, near Wat Suthat, as a religious centre so the Brahmins could continue to perform and officiate royal ceremonies at the court.

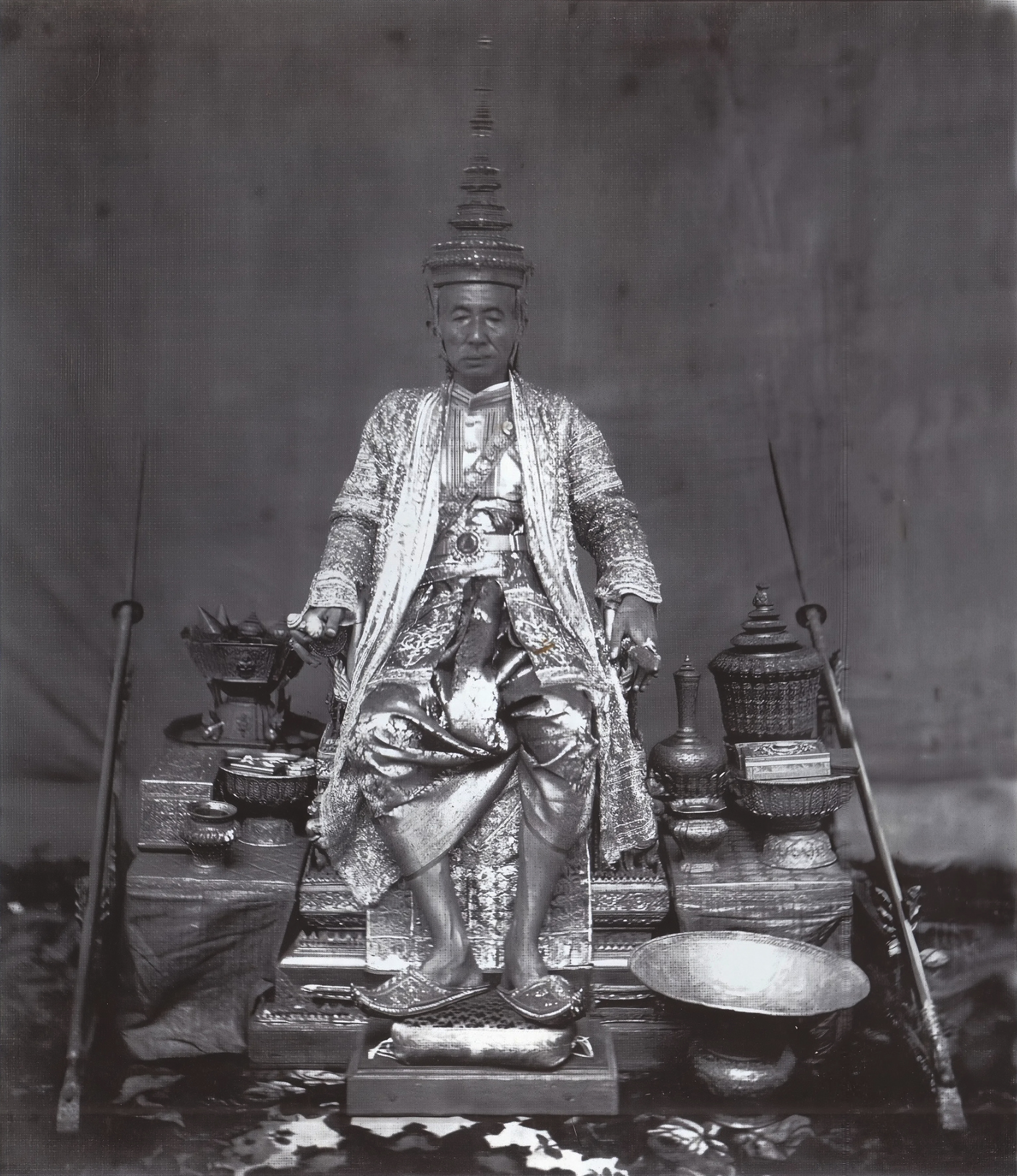
King Mongkut (Rama IV) seated on the throne wearing the royal regalia, was the first Thai king to be photographed.

The coronations of King Phutthaloetla Naphalai (Rama II) and King Nangklao (Rama III), in 1809 and 1824, followed closely those of Rama I, with no deviation recorded. When King Mongkut (Rama IV) came to the throne in 1851, new elements were included in the coronation ceremony. Since ancient times, the anointment ceremony alone was considered the supreme event of the coronation. Under King Rama IV, the crowning of the monarch became its equal, if not more important. This was due to the influence of European coronations. The King also increased the role of the Buddhist Sangha within the ceremony by incorporating the recitation of the Paritta Suttas into the hitherto Hindu ceremony. Of note was a letter to the editor of The Straits Times written by Dan Beach Bradley, an American missionary living in Bangkok, that in 1851, before his coronation, the King, "...styles himself now the President or Acting King of Siam."

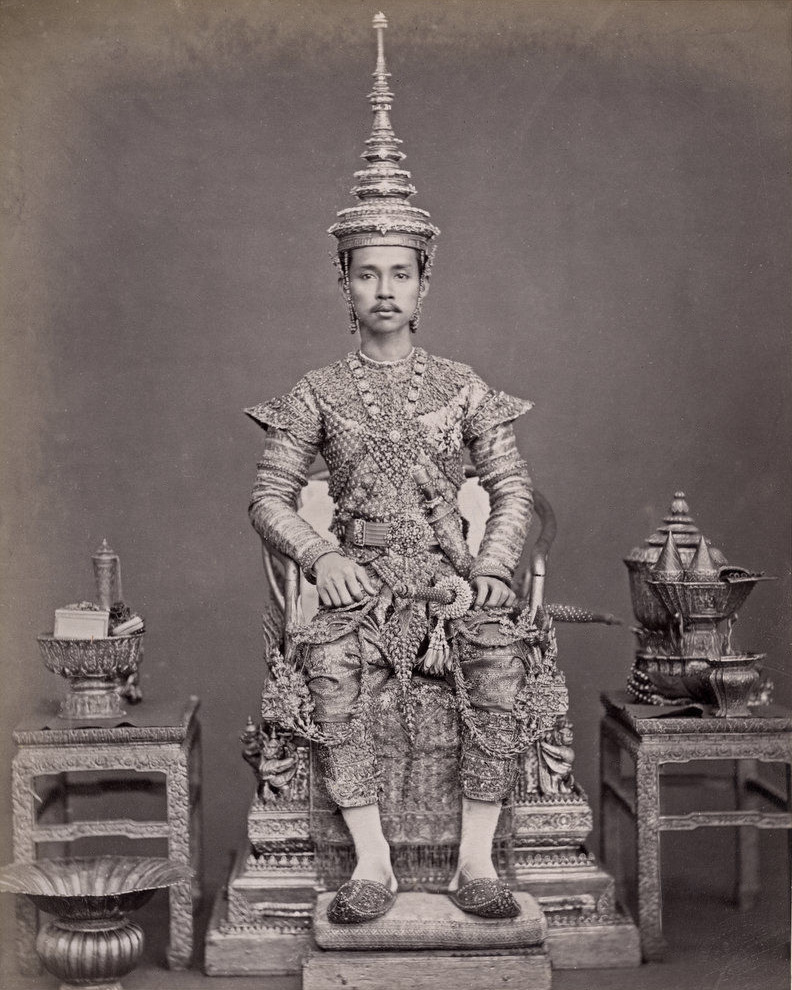
King Chulalongkorn (Rama V) seated on the throne after his second coronation in 1873 upon attaining majority

King Chulalongkorn (Rama V) ascended to the throne at the age of 15, under the regency of Somdet Chaophraya Sri Suriwongse. He was given no political power, but was crowned with a full ceremony on 11 November 1868, only a month after the death of King Rama IV. When he attained majority at the age of 20, the King underwent another coronation ceremony on 16 November 1873. For King Rama V, the second coronation was vital in legitimising his reign, not only in the eyes of the populace and the nobility, but also to those of the Western colonial powers. The King took the opportunity of the general audience at the end of his second coronation to make a remarkable announcement, as recalled by Sir Andrew Clarke, the governor of the Straits Settlements: "The King delivered an address and, at the end of it, announced the abolition of the practice at his Court of kowtowing and lying down in the royal presence. As the words passed his lips, the recumbent figures rose, and the effect was described by those present as most impressive."

=== Modern coronations ===
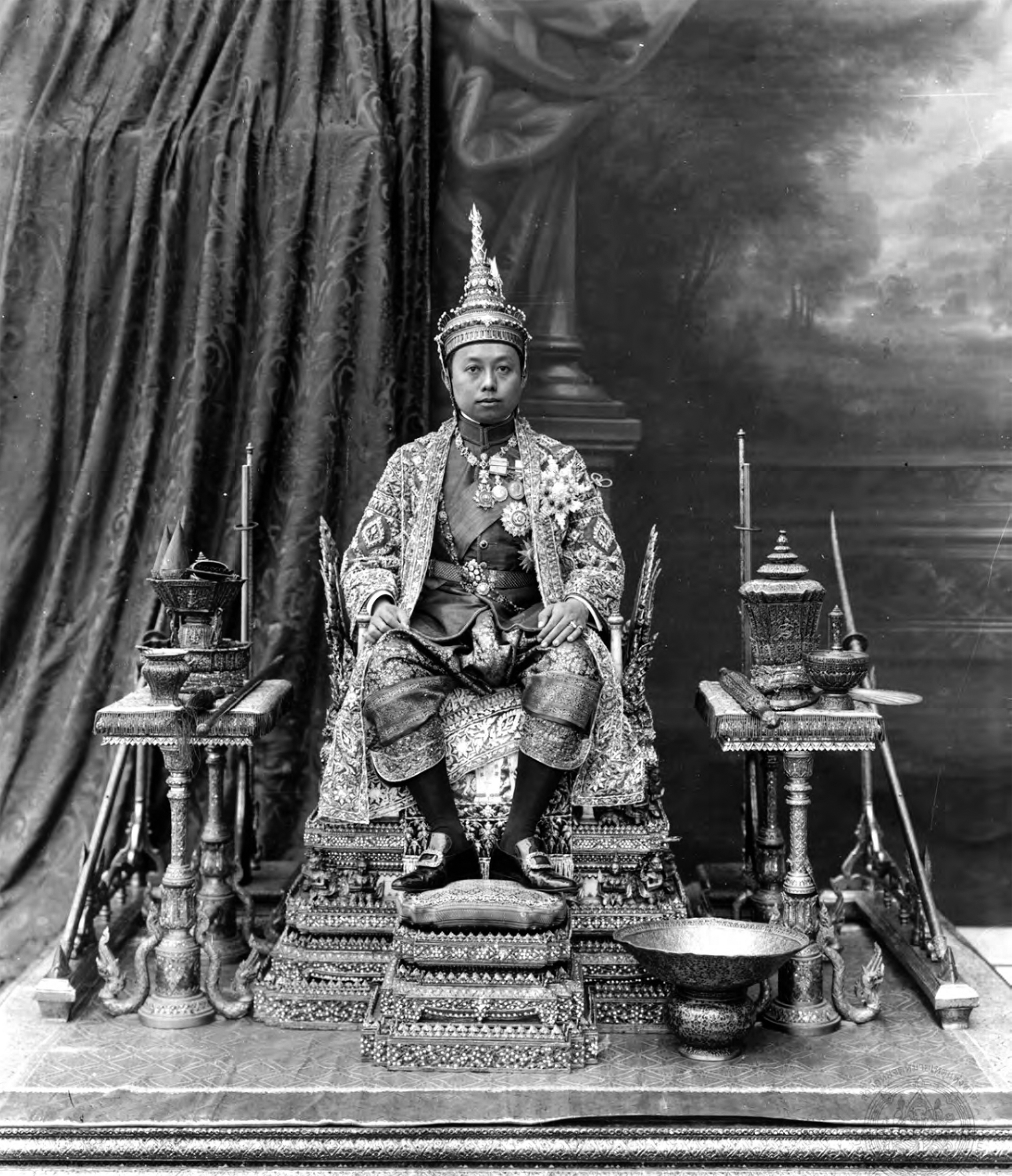
King Vajiravudh (Rama VI) seated on the throne after his second coronation in 1911

King Rama V died on 23 October 1910. On 11 November, his son King Vajiravudh (Rama VI) decided to have a solemn ceremony, stripped to its bare essentials, with the anointment and the crowning at the apex of the coronation. The King had decided beforehand to host another coronation ceremony in a year's time. He wanted to invite members of foreign royal families to join him, and to enjoy the festivities without disturbing the customary period of mourning for his father. The second coronation began on 28 November 1911 and continued for thirteen days. Representatives from fourteen different countries attended, including Prince Alexander of Teck of Great Britain, Grand Duke Boris of Russia, Prince Nicholas of Greece, Prince Valdemar of Denmark, Prince Wilhelm of Sweden, and Prince Fushimi-no-miya of Japan. The second event was a much more elaborate affair, including the state progress by land and water, banquets for foreign guests, and parades and fairs for the public. The event cost the state ฿4,884,676 or 20.87 billion baht adjusted for inflation (originally budgeted at only ฿500,000 or 2.13 billion baht adjusted for inflation), while the first coronation cost only ฿100,000 or 427 million baht adjusted for inflation. The colossal sum spent was double the cost of the coronation of King George V of the United Kingdom, held earlier the same year. Despite this, the festivities were judged a success and were lauded by the foreign press.

King Prajadhipok (Rama VII)'s coronation ceremony was scheduled for 25 February 1926. Unlike his predecessors, he wanted to wait until after the royal funeral and mourning period of the previous king (his brother had died on 26 November 1925) had come to an end. The coronation ceremony took three days, the state progress on land then took place on 1 March and the state progress on water on 3 March. Prince Devawongse Varopakarn wrote to the Japanese ambassador that King Rama VII's coronation ceremony: "Will only be one ceremony, for reasons of economy, and it will be on a simpler scale than hitherto. Special envoys from foreign countries have not been invited, but there will be no objection to the foreign envoys already in this country being so appointed for the occasion." Nevertheless, envoys from forty-seven different countries attended, and the ceremonies were completed in full. For the first time a book and several photographs of the ceremony were published by the Royal Household. An 11 minutes and 8 second silent film of the coronation ceremonies was made by the Royal State Railways of Siam with intertitles in both Thai and English.

=== Constitutional monarchy ===
After the revolution of 1932, the system of government was changed from that of an absolute to a constitutional monarchy. Three years later King Rama VII abdicated after violent disagreement with the new government led by the Khana Ratsadon (the "People's Party"). His nephew, Prince Ananda Mahidol, ascended to the throne as King Rama VIII. In 1935 the King was only eight years old and was considered too young to be crowned. His family moved him to Switzerland to be educated and for his health. The country was undergoing a massive transformation and was considered unsafe for the young King. By 1938 the government decided to invite the King to return to Bangkok. No coronation ceremony was to take place during his short visit. It was not until December 1945, after the end of the Second World War, that the King, now aged 20, was able to return permanently. A coronation was tentatively planned, despite the chaotic political situation and post-war malaise. On 9 June 1946, the King was found dead by a bullet wound to the forehead. His younger brother, Prince Bhumibol Adulyadej, was later proclaimed king as Rama IX. As he was only 19 years old, a regency council was to rule in his stead. King Rama VIII was never formally crowned, so only a seven-tiered umbrella was hung above his funerary urn. However, on 13 August, the government declared that the nine-tiered umbrella and other regalia should be presented to his remains and his regnal title changed posthumously by adding the prefix Phrabat, making him a fully consecrated king.

In late 1946, King Rama IX left Thailand and returned to Switzerland, not to return until 1950. During his absence, political crises gripped the country, precipitating a coup d'état in 1947, when the military seized power from the civilian government. Despite entreaties for the King to return to Bangkok, he refused several times. In October 1948 the King was seriously injured in a car accident near Lausanne. In early 1950 he eventually returned for the cremation ceremony of his brother, King Rama VIII. Afterwards, the King celebrated his wedding to Sirikit Kitiyakara, and the date of his coronation was set for 5 May 1950. As the first Thai monarch to be crowned under a constitutional system, albeit under military control, several new innovations were added to his coronation ceremony. Due to the King's poor health, the customary three days of benediction before the coronation was shortened to just one day. The royal pandits who were to hand the King the anointment water, formerly drawn from the ranks of the nobility, were to be replaced by members of the House of Representatives, representing the provinces of the kingdom. The coronation took place over three days. The state progressions on land and water were delayed until 1963. In 2016, King Bhumibol celebrated his Platinum Jubilee, seventy years on the throne, the longest in Thai history. He died later the same year on 13 October.

=== Recent coronation ===
On 1 December 2016 the President of the National Assembly formally invited Crown Prince Vajiralongkorn to ascend to the throne as king. Later that night Prime Minister Prayuth Chan-ocha said in a televised statement that the coronation would "be at [the King's] discretion" and would not take place until after 26 October 2017, when the royal cremation of his father was planned. For most Thai people it was the first coronation in living memory. The date of the King's coronation was widely expected to signal the resumption of politics following a year-long mourning period for King Rama IX, with an election to follow soon after. The date for a general election, in which the ruling junta, National Council for Peace and Order (who took power through a coup d'état in 2014), promised in a "road map" to civilian rule was to be postponed indefinitely until after the coronation ceremony was supposed to take place. However, some voiced doubts over this timeline and others were highly critical of the government's use of the coronation as a tool to delay the election, which was initially supposed to happen in 2016. Throughout 2018 several anti-government protests were held by various groups demanding an election as soon as possible, as the government had not set a firm date for the coronation and, subsequently, the election.

It was not until 1 January 2019 that the government announced an official date for the coronation, which was to take place later that year from 4–6 May; a palace statement said: "His Majesty deems it fit to hold the coronation ceremony per royal traditions for the good fortune of the nation and the kingdom, to be enjoyed by the hopeful people". Over the three-day coronation, on 4 May, the King was to be anointed and crowned; on 5 May, a royal procession takes place; and on 6 May, the King grants an audience for the public and foreign dignitaries. This announcement and the subsequent delay in the election prompted more protests. "There will be an election before coronation," Prime Minister Chan-ocha assured reporters by saying "We have to organize both things together, but we must give time to the coronation preparation first." Despite promising not to delay the election date further, the planned election date was postponed from 29 February to 24 March. After the highly contentious general election was finally held, with the unofficial results showing no clear winner, the pro-military Palang Pracharat Party announced that it would not seek to negotiate with other parties to forge a coalition government because it wants to focus on the coronation. In April, the government announced that Songkran festivities were to be scaled down in order to avoid clashes with the coronation.

== Royal regalia ==
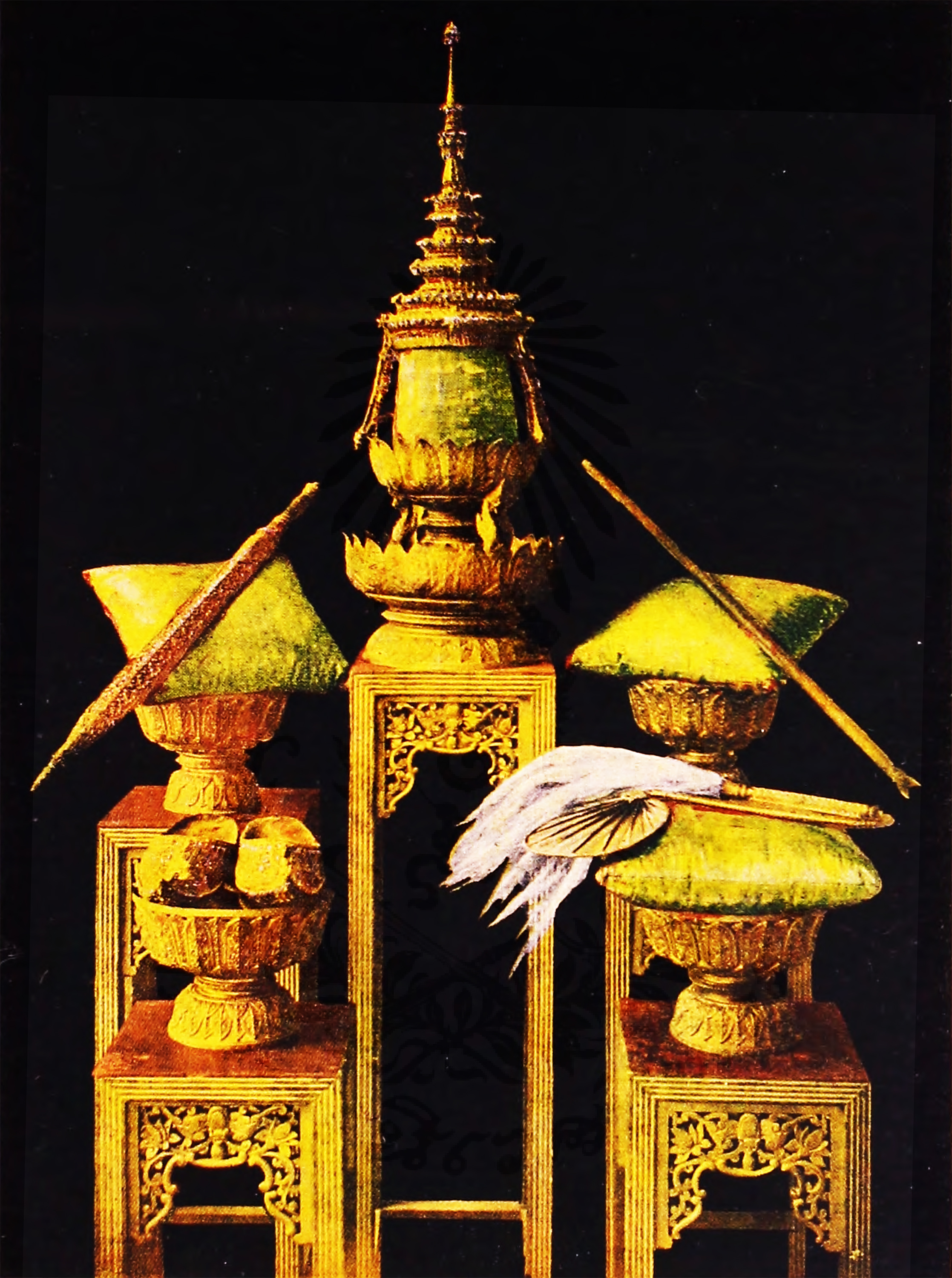
The five items of the Royal Regalia of Thailand

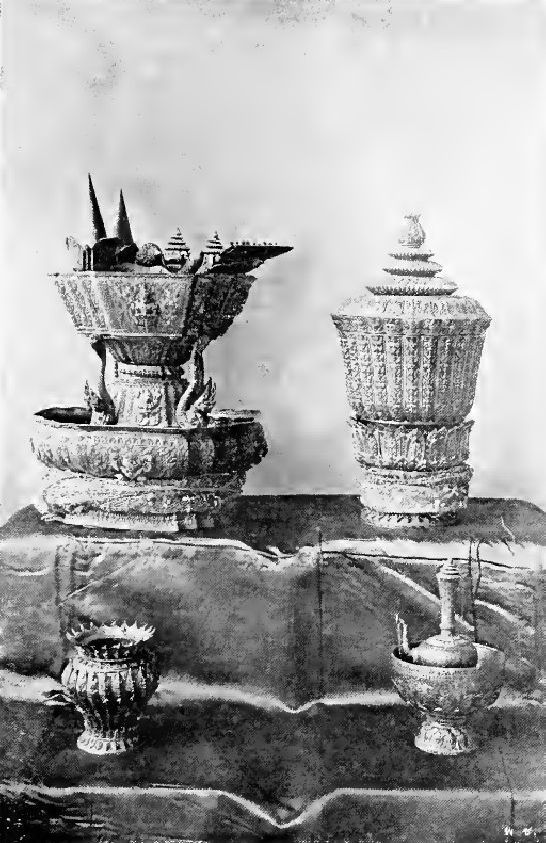
The four Royal Utensils of Thailand

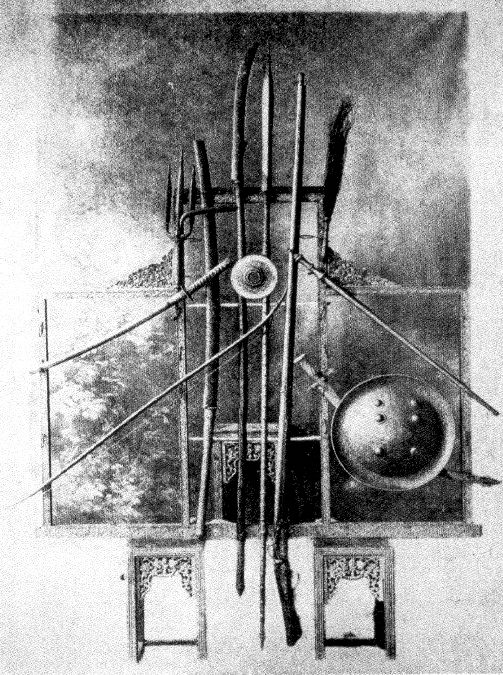
The eight Royal Weapons of Sovereignty

The royal regalia of Thailand (เครื่องราชกกุธภัณฑ์แห่งประเทศไทย) are objects accumulated by the kings of Thailand for use during their coronation ceremonies. Most were assembled around 1785 for the second coronation ceremony of King Rama I. The combination of these regal and practical objects, and their symbolism, trace back to the ancient Indian subcontinent and are replicated by many monarchies within the Greater Indian cultural sphere.

=== Nine-Tiered Umbrella ===
The Royal Nine-Tiered Umbrella (นพปฎลมหาเศวตฉัตร) is considered the most sacred and ancient of the royal regalia. The umbrella (also called a chatra) consists of many tiers, five for the crown prince (or the viceroy), seven for an unconsecrated king, and nine for a fully sovereign king. The shades are made of white silk trimmed with gold, attached to a gilded golden stem. The umbrellas are usually displayed above an important throne in the royal palace (similar to a baldachin). The umbrellas themselves are considered sacred objects and receive offerings from the king on the anniversary of his coronation day. There are currently seven such umbrellas, with six distributed at the various throne halls in the Grand Palace, and one in the Dusit Palace. Derived from ancient Hindu beliefs, the umbrella symbolises the spiritual and physical protection the king can give to his subjects. The multiple tiers symbolise the accumulation of honour and merit the king may possess.

=== Great Crown of Victory ===
The Great Crown of Victory (พระมหาพิชัยมงกุฏ) is the principal item of the five traditional royal regalia of Thailand (เบญจราชกกุธภัณฑ์). The crown is of a distinctive Thai design called mongkut. This royal crown, unlike those in the West, takes the form of a tall conical tapering spire with ear pieces that hang to the sides. Made on the orders of King Rama I, the crown is over 66 cm (26 in) in height and weighs over 7.3 kg (16 lb). Made of gold, enamelled and studded with diamonds and other precious stones, the crown is topped by a brilliant white diamond called the Phra Maha Wichian Mani (พระมหาวิเชียรมณี), bought and added later by King Rama IV.

=== Sword of Victory ===
The blade of the Sword of Victory (พระแสงขรรค์ชัยศรี) was supposedly found by a fisherman in the waters of the Tonlé Sap, Cambodia in 1784, and presented to King Rama I. He had a scabbard and hilt of gold made for the blade. Both are inlaid with diamonds and precious stones. The sword's blade measures 64.5 cm (25 in) long, while the hilt measures 25.4 cm (10 in) long. When placed in its scabbard, the sword is 101 cm (40 in) long and weighs 1.9 kg (4 lb). The sword is an ancient symbol of sovereignty and military power. The king's sword thus symbolises his role as a warrior with a duty to defend his kingdom. This harkens back to ancient times, when the king was not merely a titular, but the actual warrior-in-chief of his subjects.

=== Royal Staff ===
The Royal Staff (ธารพระกร) is made of cassia wood covered with gold gilt. The staff is 118 cm (46 in) long, and has a knob at one end and three prongs at the other. The staff or sceptre is a symbol of regal authority in many cultures.

=== Royal Fan and Flywhisk ===
The fan and flywhisk (พัดวาลวิชนี และ พระแส้หางจามรี) are items used to comfort and cool, an important accessory for a divine king especially in a tropical country. The Royal Fan (พัดวาลวิชนี) was created by order of King Rama I. The fan is gilded with gold, the handle enamelled in green and red. Traditionally a fan was made by bending a talipot palm's frond at a right angle; the royal fan mimics this traditional form. The Royal Flywhisk of the yak's tail (พระแส้หางจามรี) was made in the reign of King Rama IV to augment the five items of the regalia. Evidently associated with the same idea of divine comfort as the fan, it is actually derived from the ancient chāmara of India. According to tradition, the fly-whisk was used by the king to repel any maleficent forces that might bring discomfort to his subjects. The hair on the royal fly-whisk has since been replaced by those of a white elephant.

=== Royal Slippers ===
The Royal Slippers (ฉลองพระบาทเชิงงอน) take the form of an open-heeled slipper with the front curling upwards into a point. The exterior is decorated with diamonds and jewels, the insoles are lined with red velvet, and the soles are made of pure sheet gold. Wearing footwear was rare in ancient Southeast Asia and was probably reserved only for royalty. The importance of royal footwear can be traced back to the epic Ramayana, when a pair of Rama's sandals was chosen by Bharata to govern the kingdom in his stead, after the former was forced into exile.

=== Royal Utensils ===
The Royal Utensils (เครื่องราชูปโภค) is a separate category of items. The four items are made of gold: the Betel Nut Set (พานพระขันหมาก), the Water Urn (พระมณฑปรัตนกรัณฑ์), the Libation vessel (พระสุพรรณราช), and the Spittoon (พระสุพรรณศรี). By possessing such ordinary items, which were all made from precious materials, the king can show off his wealth and status to his subjects. The utensils are always placed at either side of the king's throne during royal ceremonies. These items are of a personal nature, and are regarded as insignia of rank, not just for the king, but for his officials as well. Once an individual is given high rank by the king, a replica set of these items would be given to him on the occasion of his promotion.

=== Weapons of sovereignty ===
The eight weapons of sovereignty (พระแสงอัษฎาวุธ) are: the Long spear (พระแสงหอกเพชรรัตน์), the Long-handled sword (พระแสงดาบเชลย), the Trident (พระแสงตรี), the Chakra (พระแสงจักร), the Short sword with Buckler (พระแสงเขนมีดาบ), the Bow (พระแสงธนู), the Elephant goad spear (พระแสงของ้าวพลพ่าย), and the Gun of Satong (พระแสงปืนคาบชุดแม่น้ำสโตง). Some of the oldest items of regalia in ancient India are weapons, the main four being the bow, the spear, the trident, and the chakra. The weapons are symbolic of the divine weapons of Shiva and Vishnu, mentioned in the Shatapatha Brahmana. The current set of weapons were all created during the reign of King Rama I, as reproductions of lost originals. Apart from the sacred weapons, the others are symbolic of the martial exploits of King Naresuan of Ayutthaya.

== Scene of the ceremonies ==
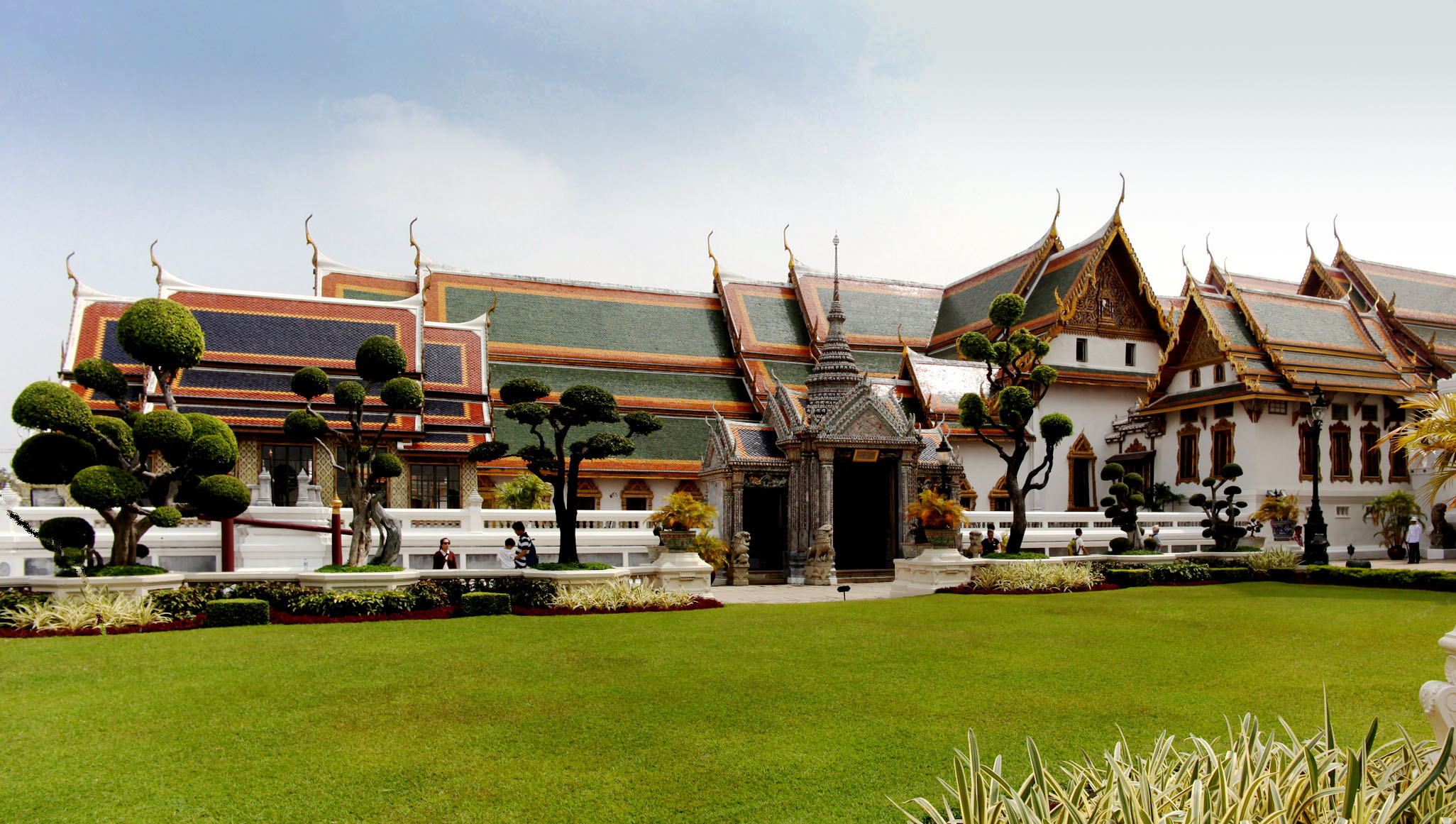
The Maha Montien or Chief Residence of the Grand Palace, is where most of the coronation ceremony takes place. From left to right: Amarin Winitchai Throne Hall, Phaisan Thaksin Hall, Chakkraphat Phiman Residence.

Most of the coronation rituals take place within the enclosure of the Phra Maha Montien (พระมหามณเฑียร) group of buildings, translated as the "chief residence". The buildings are in the Middle Court of the Grand Palace, the oldest part of the palace, having been built by King Rama I in 1782. The first three kings of the Chakri dynasty used these buildings as their primary place of residence. The building is separated into three sections, from north to south; the Amarin Winitchai throne hall, the Phaisan Thaksin hall, and the Chakkraphat Phiman residence.

The Amarin Winitchai throne hall is the grand throne room, and has two thrones. This is where the king grants his public audiences, and holds state ceremonies in front of the royal court. The Phaisan Thaksin hall is a much smaller rectangular room directly behind. It was used as a private presence chamber by previous kings. The hall also has two thrones, one at either end of the hall, and these are used only during the coronation ceremony. The last section is the Chakkraphat Phiman residence—not one but a series of connected buildings forming the king's personal apartments. The residence contains the state bedroom and the canopy bed of King Rama I, as well as other tables and couches for royal use. The back of the residence opens into the Inner Court of the palace, formerly the residence of the king's polygamous household.

== The coronation ==
=== Preliminary rites ===
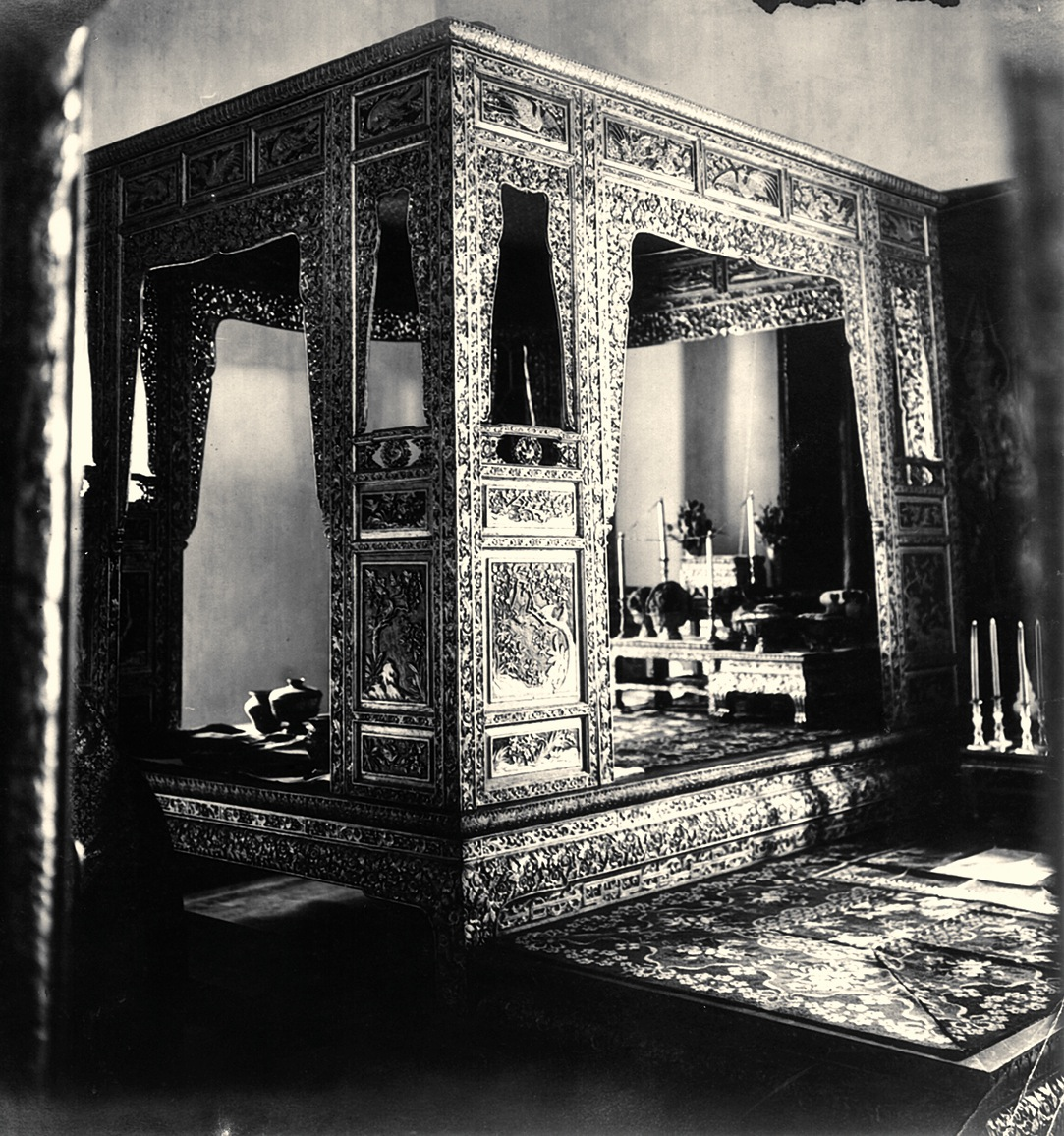
Canopy bed of King Rama I is shown inside the Chakkraphat Phiman residence. A service of benediction is usually held within these rooms prior to the coronation ceremony.

Several preliminary ceremonies are held before coronation day. The first introductory rite of the coronation is the inscribing of the new king's full ceremonial styles and titles on a golden tablet called a Phrasupphanabat (พระสุพรรณบัฏ). One day before the actual inscription ceremony, a benediction is performed by several Buddhist monks in the main chapel of the Wat Phra Kaew, or the Temple of the Emerald Buddha. On the day of the ceremony itself, a royal scribe engraves the royal styles and titles (Thai kings usually receive a new ceremonial name upon accession) on a thin rectangular gold sheet. Another sheet of gold with the king's horoscope is also engraved. The king's personal seal is also carved by a royal artisan. All of this is done with fanfare from conch trumpets and musical instruments in the presence of the monks who had officiated the previous day, and in the presence of a representative of the king (usually a senior member of the royal household). Both tablets are then wrapped in red silk, tied with several colourful cords, and finally placed inside a box, which is placed on a golden tray, which is then placed upon the altar of the Emerald Buddha together with the other items of royal regalia. This rite is usually concluded several days or a week before the main ceremony.

Usually starting around the same time, but separately, is the ancient Hindu ritual called the homa or sacrifices to fire (พิธีศาสตรปุณยาชุบโหมเพลิง). The ritual is performed by the royal court's Chief Brahmin (พระราชครูวามเทพมุนี), who is also the High Priest of Shiva, and his followers, the court Brahmin (พราหมณ์หลวง). A ceremonial pavilion is erected specifically for this purpose inside the palace. The images of the three Hindu deities (the Trimurti) are placed on three altars. Before them is placed a copper stove inscribed with the appropriate yantra, and nine basins of water each containing a small silver coin. After the usual purification rites, the citing of the yantra of worship to the eight directions and to the deities on the altar, the Brahmin will, with great ceremony, dip the leaves of certain trees, such as the Aegle marmelos, that were esteemed in ancient times for their supposed medicinal and purifying values, into the water. The leaves are offered to the king during the imminent service of benediction. The king will then brush himself on the head and hair to symbolise purification and give them back to the Chief Brahmin, who will then ceremonially burn each of the leaves.

Before the coronation day, a service of benediction (เจริญพระพุทธมนต์) will take place in all three sections of the Phra Maha Montien group of buildings. Depending on the king, the benediction service could be longer and can last over three days. The king will preside over these ceremonies himself from inside the Phaisan Thaksin hall. With the king is a chapter of thirty monks, with another forty-five monks inside the Chakkraphat Phiman residence. The king begins the ceremony by the lighting of candles. From these candles a taper is lit and given to the Supreme Patriarch of Thailand, who will proceed to the Amarin Winitchai throne hall to light a special candle called the Candle of Victory (เทียนชัย). This candle will stay lit until the end of the coronation ceremony. A senior monk will then read out a proclamation signalling the start of the coronation ceremonies. The entire assemblage of monks, following the recitation of the Five Precepts, will chant the Paritta Suttas and lay a protective thread around the buildings to ward off evil spirits. The service concludes with the monks leaving the palace. They will return for the coronation service the next day. Before the end of the day the king will also send offerings of flowers to the Hindu deities in the Brahman temple, to the sacred white royal nine-tiered umbrellas (five dotted around the various palaces), and to the images of the guardian spirits of the capital city at the city shrine.

On the same day the covered tablets of the royal seal, titles and horoscope are officially transferred from the Temple of the Emerald Buddha to the Phaisan Thaksin hall.

=== Purification bath ===
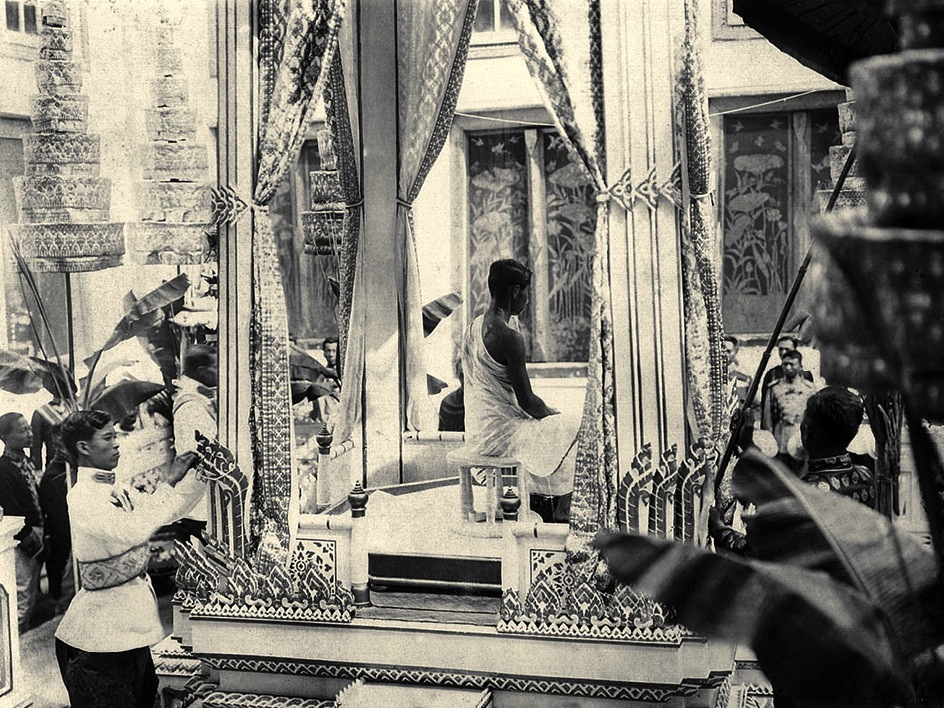
The 1926 purification bath of King Prajadhipok (Rama VII). He is wearing a white robe, similar in appearance to those worn by Buddhist monks.

The first coronation rite is the purification bath of the king (พระราชพิธีสรงพระมูรธาภิเษก). On the morning of the coronation day, the king will arrive at the Amarin Winitchai throne hall in the uniform of a field marshal of the Royal Thai Army. He will first light a candle and make a special offering to the Buddha images inside the hall, and then proceed to the Phaisan Thaksin Hall. After performing a brief prayer (repeating the Five Precepts), and receiving a blessing from the assembled monks inside the hall, at the auspicious time the Chief Brahmin will invite the king to take a ceremonial bath. The king will change into a white robe, symbolic of purity (similar to a monk's Kasaya). Prior to taking the bath, the king will pause at an altar erected in the courtyard to light candles and make offerings to Hindu deities.

The water used in this ceremony is collected from the five principal rivers of the kingdom: the Chao Phraya, the Pa Sak, the Mae Klong (or Rachaburi), the Phetchaburi, and the Bang Pakong. This mirrors the five ancient Indian rivers, the Ganges, the Mahi, the Yamuna, the Sarayu, and the Achiravati. Also included is water from the four ancient ponds of Suphanburi and consecrated water from important Buddhist temples around the kingdom. A specially constructed pavilion is erected on a courtyard between the Phaisan Thaksin and Chakkraphat Phiman Halls. Once the king is seated inside the pavilion, some of the water will be given to him in a small golden bowl. The king will dip his hand into this water and rub the top of his head with it. A rope will then be pulled, which releases a shower of water from a canopy above. The king will be offered the water in small bowls by members of the Buddhist clergy, the royal family, government ministers, and other officials as an act of blessing.

This rite is the equivalent of many Hindu and particularly Brahmanic traditions, whereby before an important religious ceremony is to occur, one must ritually purify oneself through ablution. This is not to be confused with the rite of anointment, which is the next ceremony the king undertakes.

While the ceremonial bath is in progress, a fanfare of drums, trumpets and traditional Thai music is played. Elsewhere, ancient artillery fires a 101-gun salute within the precinct of the Grand Palace and at Sanam Luang. A mantra of benediction is recited by eighty monks inside the Chakkraphat Phiman residence. After he has finished receiving the water from high officials, the king will return to his private apartments in the Chakkraphat Phiman residence before reappearing in full regal vestments in the Phaisan Thaksin Hall for the anointing ceremony.

=== Anointing ===
The royal anointing ceremony (พระราชพิธีถวายน้ำอภิเษก) begins after the king is changed into his regal vestments. This elaborate and highly decorated traditional Thai costume is composed of a golden embroidered jacket, traditional silk shirt and pha nung lower garment. The king proceeds from his private apartments to the Octagonal Throne, at the east end of the Phaisan Thaksin hall, led by royal pandits and Brahmins in a specific order.

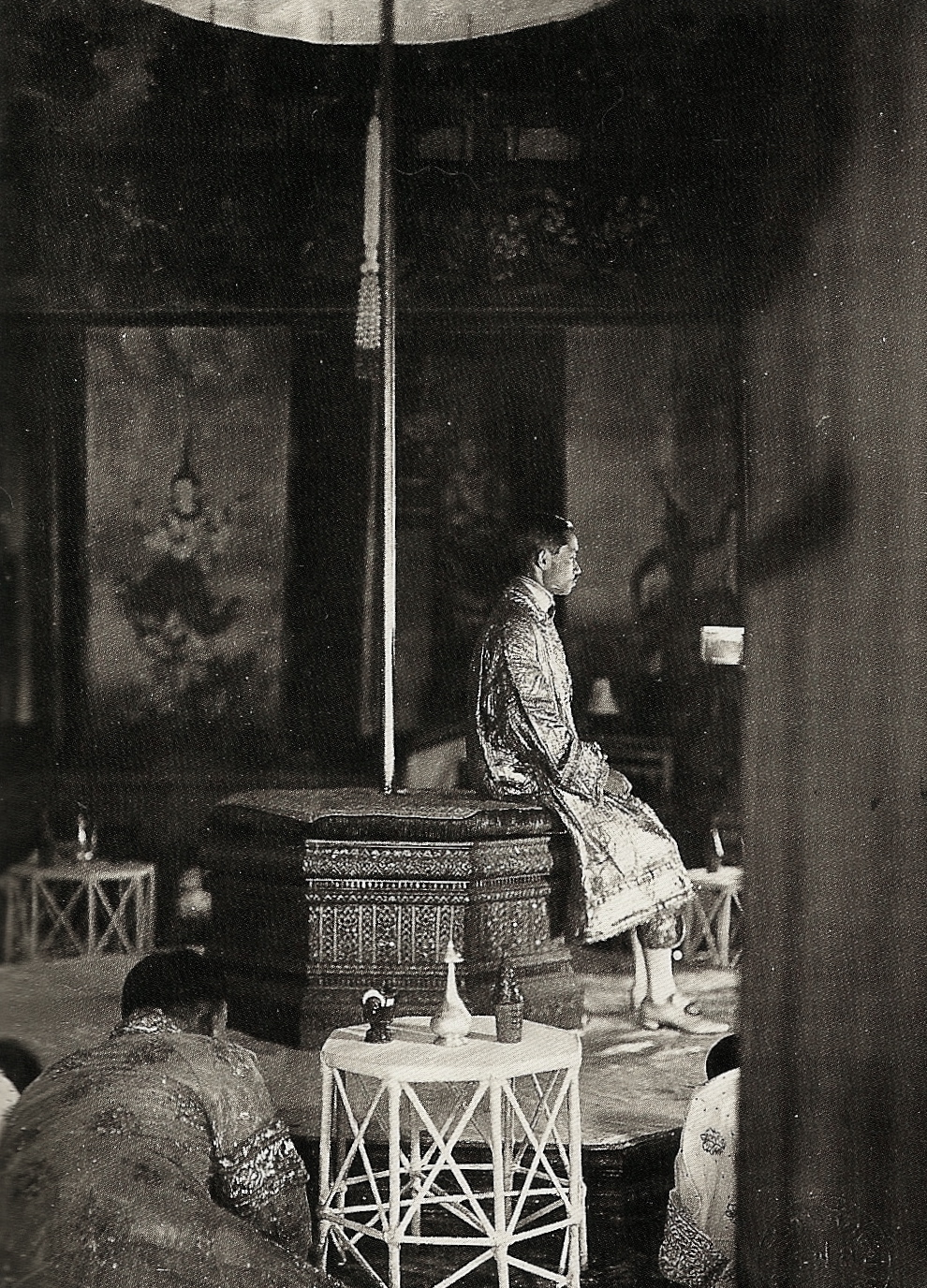
King Prajadhipok shown on the Octagonal Throne, receiving homage from royal pandits, 1926.

The Octagonal Throne (พระที่นั่งอัฐทิศอุทุมพรราชอาสน์) was made of Indian fig wood or udumbara (the Ficus racemosa) in the shape of an octagonal prism and covered in gold. This unusually shaped throne was placed here by the orders of King Rama I specifically for use in this part of the coronation ceremony. Before the ceremony is completed, the throne is topped with the seven-tiered white umbrella, the symbol of an unconsecrated king.

Opposite the eight sides of the throne are eight small tables on which the sacred images of various guardians are placed, with space for the anointment water vessels and conch shells. The anointment water used for this ceremony is taken from eighteen shrines and temples around the country, as divided into eight quadrants in accordance with the eight cardinal directions of the compass, with Bangkok being at the centre. These temples were selected based on their significance, either for being located at a surviving centre of an ancient civilisation, or near a modern centre of administration. The consecrated water is conveyed by urns to arrive in Bangkok several days before, and some is mixed in with the water gathered in the Grand Palace beforehand.

The king will first sit facing the east, the pandit in charge over that direction will advance and after paying homage (by the act of prostrating in front of the king) will address him in Pali (a spoken form of the ancient Magadhi Prakrit language), and then again in Thai:

The Eastern Pandit: May it please your Majesty! May the Sovereign here give me leave to pronounce his victory. May the Sovereign, turning now towards the East, seated upon his royal throne, extend his protection and exercise his royal authority over all those realms situated to (the east) and all beings that therein dwell. May he remain on earth further protecting this kingdom, as well as her Buddhist religion and her people. May he remain long in sovereignty, without ills, accomplishing success, and may his years number a hundred. May the Sovereign Guardian of the East, renowned as Dhṛtarāṣṭra, gently protect the King and his realms. Whoever create evil in this eastern quarter may the Sovereign, through his might, triumph over them all in a righteous manner.

The eastern pandit will then advance to the foot of the throne and hand a cup of water from the eastern provinces to the king, while reciting the following prayer:

The Eastern Pandit: Through the power of the Triple Gems (the Buddha, the Dharma and the Sangha), and through this water poured down upon him may the King be awarded success in the way heretofore invoked.

The king then dips his fingers into the cup and wipes his face with the water, he replies:

The King: Your auspicious speech, going right to the heart of kings, I fain accept. May it come to pass as you have said. I shall extend my protection and exercise my royal authority over all those realms to the East and all beings that dwell therein. I shall remain on earth further protecting this kingdom, and her Buddhist religion and her people. The Eastern Pandit: Good, my Lord.

The king then turns to the southeast, where the same Pali and Thai language dialogues will be repeated with changes to the name of the direction and of the corresponding celestial guardian of that direction. The eight guardians of the directions are derived from the traditional Buddhist idea of Hindu mythology, including the four heavenly kings: Dhṛtarāṣṭra (east), Virūḍhaka (south), Virūpākṣa (west) and Vaiśravaṇa (north), also known as Kubera; and the four subsidiary beings: Bhuta (southeast), Deva (southwest), Nāga (northwest) and Yaksha (northeast).

The king then continues clockwise, repeating the dialogue and anointment, eight times overall, until finally returning to the east. The pandit of the east will then sum up the anointment with a similar speech as above, with appropriate replies from the king. The Chief Brahmin will then approach the king and hand him the great royal nine-tiered white umbrella, the symbol of a consecrated king. The king will accept it and hand it over to a royal page. A mantra is then invoked by the Brahmin, to fanfare and music. The king will then rise from the throne and proceed to the crowning.

=== Crowning ===
Proceeding to the west end of the Phaisan Thaksin hall to begin the crowning and investiture ceremony (พระราชพิธีถวายเครื่องสิริราชกกุธภัณฑ์), the king sits on another throne called the Phatharabit Throne (พระที่นั่งภัทรบิฐ). This gilded chair is flanked by two high tables. Over the throne is another seven-tiered white umbrella, this umbrella is replaced immediately by the nine-tiered royal umbrella as the king has now been consecrated. He is led in procession by the court Brahmins and followed behind by royal pages bearing items of the royal regalia, royal utensils, and the weapons of sovereignty, these having been transported in state from the Wat Phra Kaew earlier in the morning.

Once seated, the king will receive homage from the Chief Brahmin, who will then recite a mantra called "Opening the portals of Kailash" (from the Tiruvacakam). This Tamil language mantra is an invitation for the deities, chiefly Shiva, to come to earth and merge in the person of the consecrated king. After this is finished the high priest directly addresses the king, first in Pali and then in Thai, while handing him the golden tablet of his style and title. He then says:

The Chief Brahmin: May it please Your Majesty to grant me leave to address Your Majesty! Since Your Majesty has received full anointment and become His Majesty the King of Siam, we therefore beg in unanimity to present to Your Majesty Your full style and title as engraved upon the tablet of gold as also to hand to Your Majesty these regalia befitting Your high dignity. May Your Majesty be known by that style and accept these regalia. Having done so, may Your Majesty take upon Yourself the business of government, and, for the good and happiness of the populace, reign on in righteousness! The King: Be it so, Brahmin.

The Chief Brahmin then takes the Great Crown of Victory from its bearer and hands it to the king. The king will then crown himself with it. At that moment a fanfare of instruments (performed by the Prakhom band of the royal court) is played inside the palace, while the royal anthem is also played by a military band outside. A 40-gun salute by artillery is fired simultaneously outside the palace walls. Elsewhere inside the royal residence the monks waiting within begins to chant a blessing. The Brahmin then hands the king the other items of the royal regalia, royal utensils, and the weapons of sovereignty. He accepts each in succession and then hands them to a page who displays them on two tables on either side of the throne. At the conclusion of the presentation, the entire group of Brahmin will render homage to the king with the Chief Brahmin kneeling in front of the group while pronouncing the final benediction:

The Chief Brahmin: May His Majesty, the Supreme Lord, Who now reigns over the kingdom here, triumph over all and everywhere always.

The king will then pronounce his first command:

The King: Brahmans, now that I have assumed the full responsibility of government, I will reign with righteousness, for the benefit and happiness of the Siamese people. I extend my royal authority over you and your goods and your chattels, and as your sovereign do hereby provide for your righteous protection, defence and keeping. Trust me and live at ease. The Chief Brahmin: I do receive the first command of Your Majesty.

Now being fully crowned, the king will scatter gold and silver flowers and coins among the Brahmins as alms. The king will then pour water into a bowl as an offering to Phra Mae Thorani the goddess of earth. This is an ancient Hindu rite of ratification and confirmation for a good deed.

The king then removes his crown as a sign of humility and devotion and proceeds to the Chakkraphat Phiman residence with chamberlains and pages bearing the royal regalia following him. Waiting for him is a chapter of monks, who had officiated the night before. The king will then receive a formal blessing from the Supreme Patriarch himself and then a blessing from the entire congregation of monks. An offering of yellow robes is made by the king to all the monks. The benediction service will then conclude with the extinguishing of the Candle of Victory by a senior monk. With the religious part of the coronation finished the monks retire from the palace.

=== General audience ===
With the main coronation rituals completed, the king is ready to grant an audience, and receive the homage of the royal princes, state officials and diplomats in the Amarin Winitchai throne hall. The King's Guard forms a guard of honour around the throne hall. The king's royal and sacred white elephant and the royal charger, both fully covered in decorative cloth, are tethered outside the throne hall. These animals are important symbols dating back to ancient India, and are two of the 'jewels' every great king should possess. Meanwhile, outside the Grand Palace the royal barge is moored at the royal pier.

The king in his regal vestments, wearing the Great Crown of Victory, makes his way from the residence behind and sits on the Phuttan Kanchanasinghat throne (พระที่นั่งพุดตานกาญจนสิงหาสน์). This highly ornamental throne is shaped like a step pyramid; the different tiers are decorated with the figures of Devatas and Garudas. Above the throne is the nine-tiered royal umbrella. The throne is situated near to the south side of the hall. At this point a heavy gold curtain separates and obscures the enthroned king from his audience on the northern side of the hall. When the king is ready a fanfare will begin, a salute is rendered and with three taps of two ivory blocks (as a signal), the curtain is suddenly drawn back to reveal to the waiting audience the king in state.

The audience is made up of members of the royal family, government ministers, members of the legislature, judiciary, state officials, foreign guests, and members of the diplomatic corps—all in their finest state uniforms and decorations. Behind the throne are the royal pages bearing all the regalia and other items that the king has just received from the Brahmins. Once the curtain is open the royal anthem is played outside the throne hall. An address is then made to the king. Before 1950, a royal prince, who was also a senior member of the government, made this address. However this task has now been delegated to the prime minister of Thailand on behalf of the government, civil servants, and members of the armed forces and police. The speech is formulaic and usually begins by referring to the successful completion of the coronation and then wishing the king a long and auspicious reign. An additional speech is also made by the president of the National Assembly on behalf of the people. Afterwards the king replies with his own address, thanking the dignitaries, and urging those present to continue discharging their duties as before. With a bow from the audience at the end of the speech, a fanfare is sounded and the curtain is immediately closed as the royal anthem is played once again.

=== Installation of the queen ===
After the end of the general audience, the king will return to the Phaisan Thaksin hall and conduct another audience, this time with the royal ladies of the court (referred to as Fai Nai: ฝ่ายใน; literally "those on the inside" of the palace). Prior to the 20th century, the ladies of the court were made up of the king's polygamous household and all the female members of the royal family. A formal presentation is usually made to the king of the twelve maidens who will join his household as royal consorts. However, since the coronation of King Rama VII in 1926, this occasion has been superseded by the ceremony of the installation of the queen instead. Traditionally Thai kings possessed many wives but raised few of them to the rank of queen. This changed on 25 February 1926, when King Rama VII gave the title of queen to his only consort Rambai Barni immediately after his own coronation, and ending the practice of royal polygamy. On 5 May 1950 King Rama IX followed this tradition by giving his consort Sirikit Kitiyakara the title of Somdet Phra Borommarachini (สมเด็จพระบรมราชินี).

The ceremony of installation begins when a proclamation is read announcing that the king, who is now consecrated and empowered, has decided to raise the rank of his consort to queen. The king, sitting on the Phatharabit Throne and still in his regal vestments, will anoint his consort with sacred water from a conch shell as she prostrates in front of him. This is a smaller replica of the king's own anointment. However, the role of the Brahmin is undertaken by the king himself, who is now fully able to carry out this divine and priestly function. Furthermore, there is a long-standing taboo against the touching of female royalty. The king will then decorate the queen with the insignias of the Order of the Royal House of Chakri and the Order of the Nine Gems, while fanfare and music is played. The queen then rises and takes her seat on a royal chair, beside the king. Together they receive the congratulations and homage from the female members of the court. After a customary reply from the king, the royal couple then retires to the residence while scattering coins along the way.

=== Defender of the Buddhist religion ===
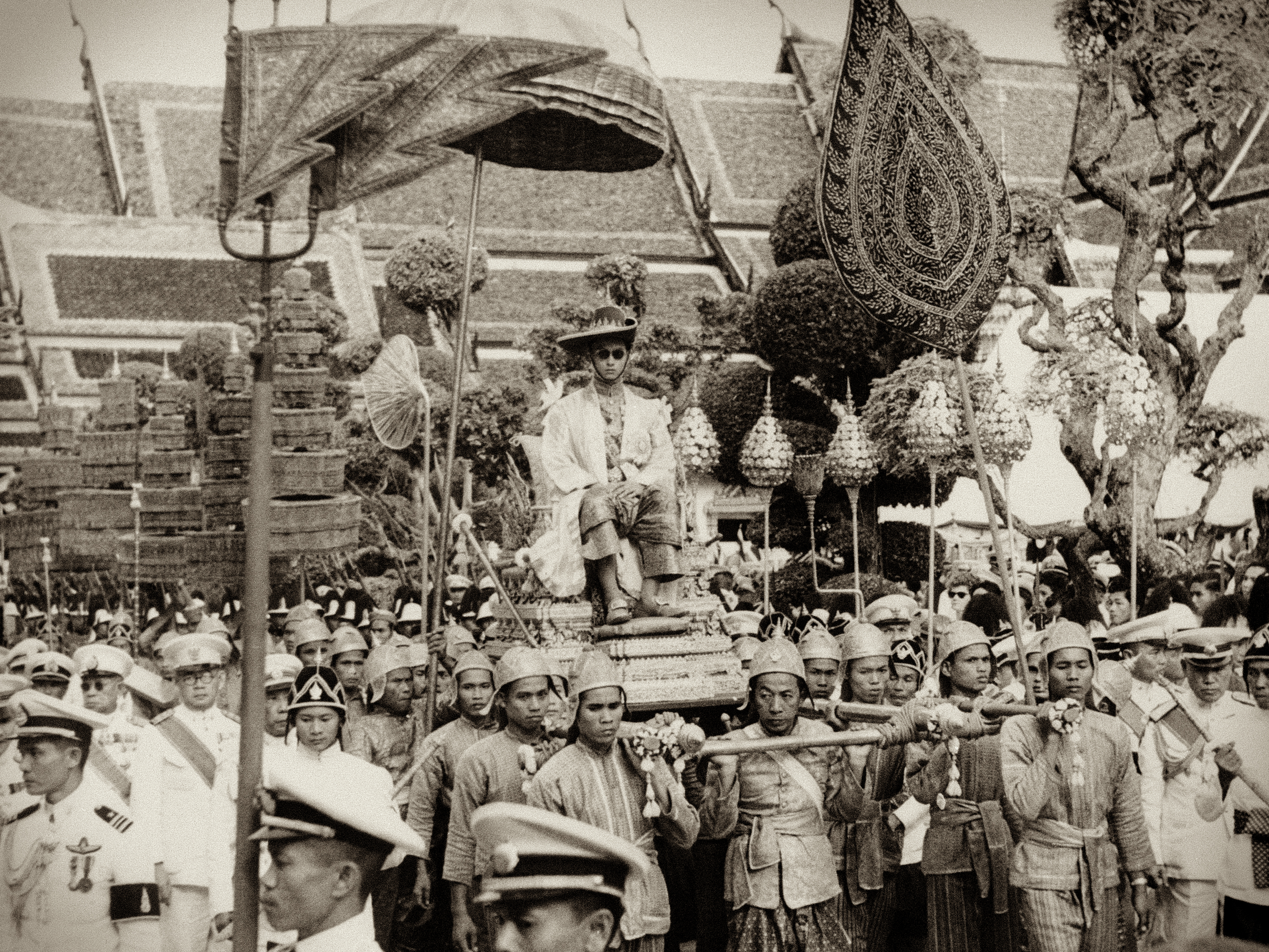
King Bhumibol Adulyadej is being carried on a royal palanquin to the Wat Phra Kaew to vow to defend the Buddhist religion in 1950. The king wears a wide-brimmed hat and sunglasses.

The king will then make a visit to the Wat Phra Kaew, the royal chapel of the palace. Travelling the short distance from the royal residence to the temple in state, the king will sit on a royal palanquin with many retainers in procession. Once arriving at the temple precinct he will travel on foot. Inside the chapel in front of the Emerald Buddha, the king will offer silver and gold flowers and then light candles in front of sacred images, in the full presence of a chapter of monks already seated inside. It is here that he will make a formal declaration of his faith, and state his willingness to become the 'Defender of the Faith' (อัครศาสนูปถัมภก) in the following speech:

The King: My Lords! Whereas being a believer and one pleased (with the religion of the Buddha), having taken refuge in the Triple Gems in due form, and now having been anointed in sovereignty, I therefore give myself up to the Buddha, the Dharma, and the Sangha; I shall provide for the righteous protection, defence and keeping of the Buddhist Religion. If agreeable, my Lords, may the Brotherhood recognise me as 'Defender of the Buddhist Faith'. Monks: Sadhu! Sadhu! Sadhu!

The whole chapter of monks then signifies their acceptance by chanting a benediction. At the end, the king will return to the palace. This purely Buddhist ceremony was included by King Rama VI, who wanted to reinforce the role of Buddhism as the national religion, and to reinforce the idea of Buddhist kingship in the minds of the people. Since the first Thai constitution in 1932, the king is expected to be a Buddhist. He is also constitutionally required to be the 'upholder' or 'defender' of the Buddhist religion.

=== Homage to the royal ancestors ===
From the temple the king travels by state palanquin to the Dusit Maha Prasat throne hall. Here the king will light candles and make a short homage in memory of his royal ancestors in the presence of Buddhist monks. The urns containing the relics of past kings and queens are displayed on a throne. The homage is the final public ceremony of the day. After candles are lit in front of the urns, he is then seated, following which he gives new robes to the monks presiding over the service before returning to his seat. The monks then, in response, utter a mantra of benediction, and after the benediction he departs, formally ending the service.

== Assumption of the residence ==
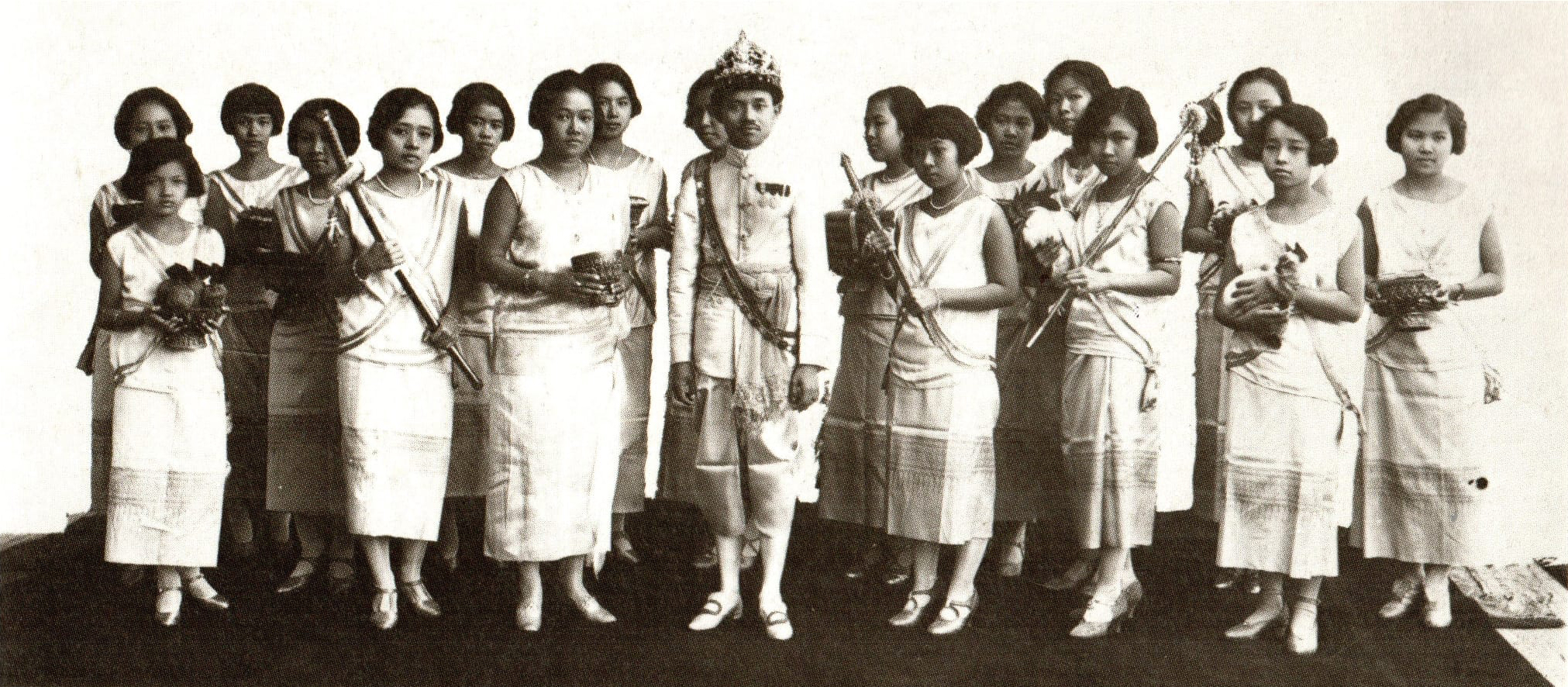
King Prajadhipok and Queen Rambai Barni are surrounded by princesses for the ceremony of the Assumption of the Residence in 1926. The princess (second from the right), who was one of the king's nieces, is holding a siamese cat to symbolise domesticity.

The ceremony of the assumption of the residence (พระราชพิธีเฉลิมพระราชมณเฑียร) is essentially a private housewarming celebration by members of the royal family. It is usually conducted a day after the coronation. The ceremony formalises the king taking up his official residence in the Grand Palace. The royal apartments of the Chakkraphat Phiman, which have already been blessed by monks prior to the coronation, is made ready for the king to inhabit. Once the coronation is over, the king can now legitimately enter the residence and claim his rightful inheritance. At an auspicious time, the king and queen will make their way to the state bedchamber within the Chakkraphat Phiman residence, followed by young ladies of the royal family, each bearing an article of domestic use or relics of past magical rites. These include an image of the Buddha (the religion of the household), a white rooster (signifying stateliness), a cat (signifying domesticity), a pestle or grinding stone (signifying firmness), a cucumber (signifying coolness, therefore happiness) and all sorts of grains, peas, and sesame seeds (signifying fertility). Two senior female members of the royal family will welcome them and gift to the king a fly-whisk made from a white elephant's tail and a bunch of areca flowers. Another royal lady, who is also an official of the palace will then hand the king a golden key, symbolic of his ownership of the residence.

After accepting these gifts, the king then lies down formally on the bed and receives a blessing from the two senior ladies. This part of the ceremony is very similar to a bedding ceremony. In this case the value of such a ceremony is to impress upon the king his responsibility as the guardian, not only of the people and the country, but also of the private institutions of the monarchy. That the ceremony is taking place inside the bedchamber of his ancestors is significant. Furthermore, the ceremony itself is presided over by the senior female members of his family, whose safety and welfare is now his responsibility.

== Aftermath ==
=== Additional events ===
Speech of King Vajiralongkorn in his public audience at Suthaisawan Prasat Pavilion Hall, 6 May 2019.

After the coronation ceremony is finished, several important receptions are held by the king. A banquet or an audience for the diplomatic corps and royal envoys is held. Furthermore, a grand public audience might also be held by the king, appearing on a balcony in a pavilion over the walls of the Grand Palace; the king usually gives a speech to the waiting public below. A special Buddhist service might also be held in the Amarin Winitchai throne hall where the king, now with newly acquired priestly powers, could present letters patent appointing abbots and give ranks to monks from the various Buddhist sects within Thailand.

=== State progresses ===
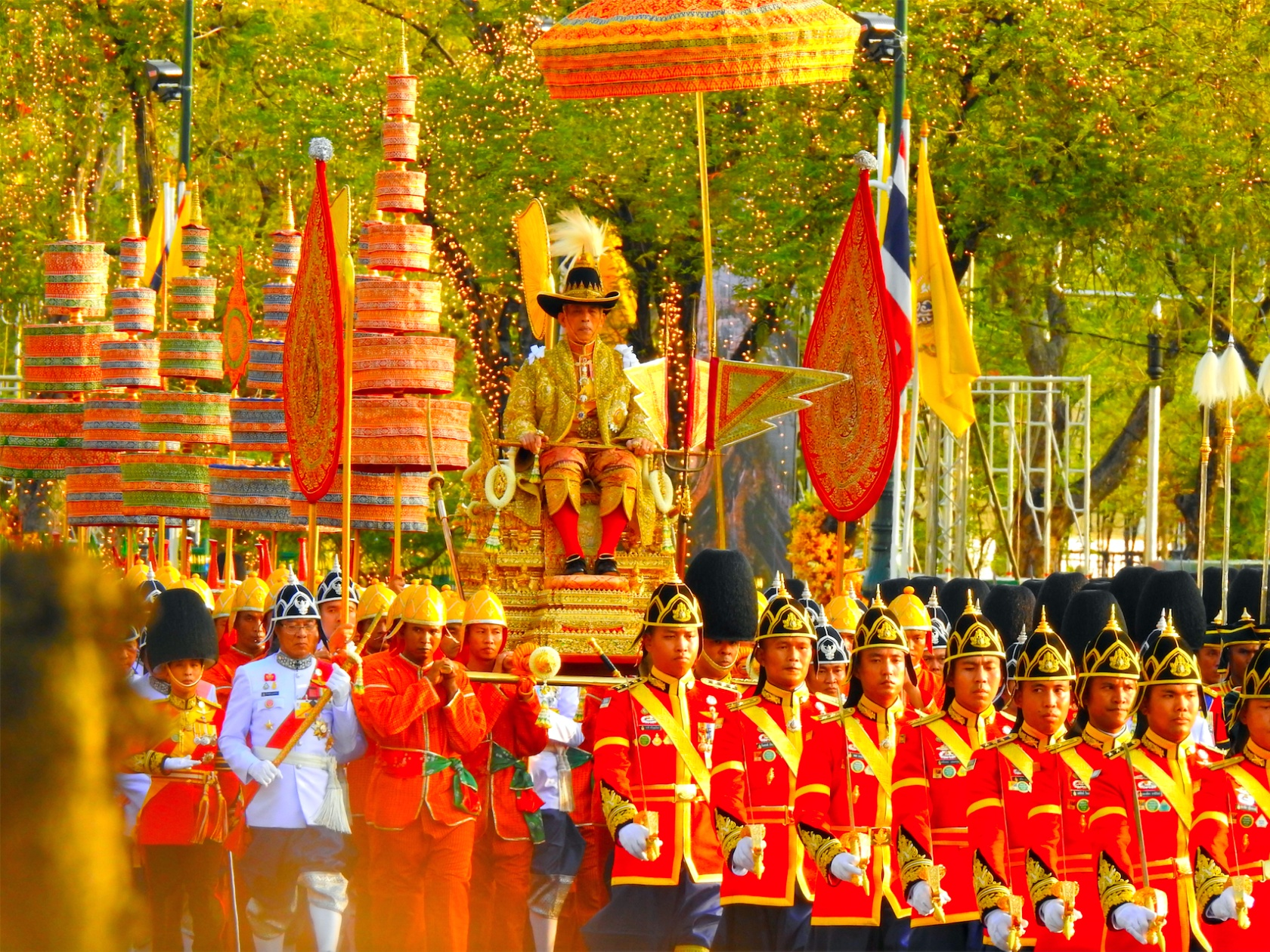
The state progress on land for the coronation of King Maha Vajiralongkorn, 5 May 2019.

Two state progresses of the king outside the palace usually take place soon after the end of the coronation ceremony. Often referred to as a circumambulation of the capital city (เลียบเมือง) the progresses were made by the king as a way of displaying himself before the people. This act of circumambulation is based on the ancient practice of Parikrama, whereby the worshiper travels clockwise around a holy place or shrine. The state progress on land would entail the king sitting on a palanquin being led in procession by his retainers traveling with the Grand Palace on his right shoulder, around the city walls of Bangkok. King Rama IV adjusted the progress on land by including several stops in order to visit important temples in the city along the way. The king would dismount his palanquin and worship at the principal Buddha image and offer robes to the monks of each temple. The state progress on water is a royal barge procession travelling along the Chao Phraya river, taking the king from the Grand Palace south to Wat Arun. In the past, the royal barge surrounded by hundreds of other stately barges would then return the king back to the palace, after he had worshiped at the principal shrine at Wat Arun, today the King, following his disembarking from the royal barge, leaves Wat Arun following his visit en route to the palace via a motorcade procession.

=== Commemorations ===
The day of the coronation is commemorated with an anniversary celebration every year thereafter. The date is made a public holiday and is known as the Coronation Day (วันฉัตรมงคล) or literally 'the day of the blessing of the umbrella' and involves the king himself carrying out certain rites in remembrance of his consecration. The main ceremony is a benediction service by monks inside the Amarin Winitchai throne hall, where the royal regalia, royal utensils and royal weapons are displayed on the Phuttan Kanchanasinghat throne. The court Brahmin would then chant a mantra, in the presence of the king, and perform a circumambulation of the nine-tiered umbrella. Gold and silver flowers will then be offered to the spirits protecting the throne, followed by the tying of a strip of red cloth around the umbrella's stem, and ending the service by the sprinkling of lustral water on the royal regalia. For the late King Rama IX the celebration usually involved a general audience, where he appeared in state seated on the throne under the nine-tiered umbrella to receive well wishes. After his death the public holiday (on 5 May) was cancelled by the government in 2017.

== List of coronations (1782–present) ==
Portrait	Monarch's name	Reign	Coronation date	Notes
	King Rama I	6 April 1782 – 7 September 1809	10 June 1782	First abbreviated coronation ceremony.
	King Rama I	6 April 1782 – 7 September 1809	17 June 1785	Second coronation with full ceremony—rites based on instructions compiled by a royal committee—new items of royal regalia created.
	King Rama II	7 September 1809 – 21 July 1824	17 September 1809	Complete coronation ceremony.
	King Rama III	21 July 1824 – 2 April 1851	1 August 1824	Complete coronation ceremony.
	King Mongkut (Rama IV)	2 April 1851 – 1 October 1868	15 May 1851	Complete coronation ceremony, with new elements—first time foreign guests are invited to participate.
	King Chulalongkorn (Rama V)	1 October 1868 – 23 October 1910	11 November 1868	First coronation ceremony, under the regency of Sri Suriwongse.
	King Chulalongkorn (Rama V)	1 October 1868 – 23 October 1910	16 November 1873	Second coronation ceremony after attaining majority—Regency ends formally on the same date.
	King Vajiravudh (Rama VI)	23 October 1910 – 26 November 1925	11 November 1910	Complete coronation ceremony—only the basic elements.
	King Vajiravudh (Rama VI)	23 October 1910 – 26 November 1925	28 November 1911	Second coronation ceremony with more festivities and participation of foreign royals.
	King Prajadhipok (Rama VII)	26 November 1925 – 2 March 1935	25 February 1926	Complete coronation ceremony—Rambai Barni installed as the Queen. The first coronation ceremony to be filmed officially.
	King Bhumibol Adulyadej (Rama IX)	9 June 1946 – 13 October 2016	5 May 1950	Complete coronation ceremony, with minor changes in line with constitutional monarchy and the shortening of some of the rites—Sirikit installed as the Queen.
	King Vajiralongkorn (Rama X)	13 October 2016 – present	4 May 2019	Complete coronation ceremony—Suthida installed as the Queen. The first coronation ceremony to be broadcast on television and streamed online worldwide.

== See also ==
- Monarchy of Thailand
- Rama (Kings of Thailand)
- Grand Palace
- Coronations in Asia
- Rājyābhiṣeka
- Abhisheka
- Royal Nine-Tiered Umbrella
- Thai royal funeral
