= Udumbara (Buddhism) =

Term in Buddhism

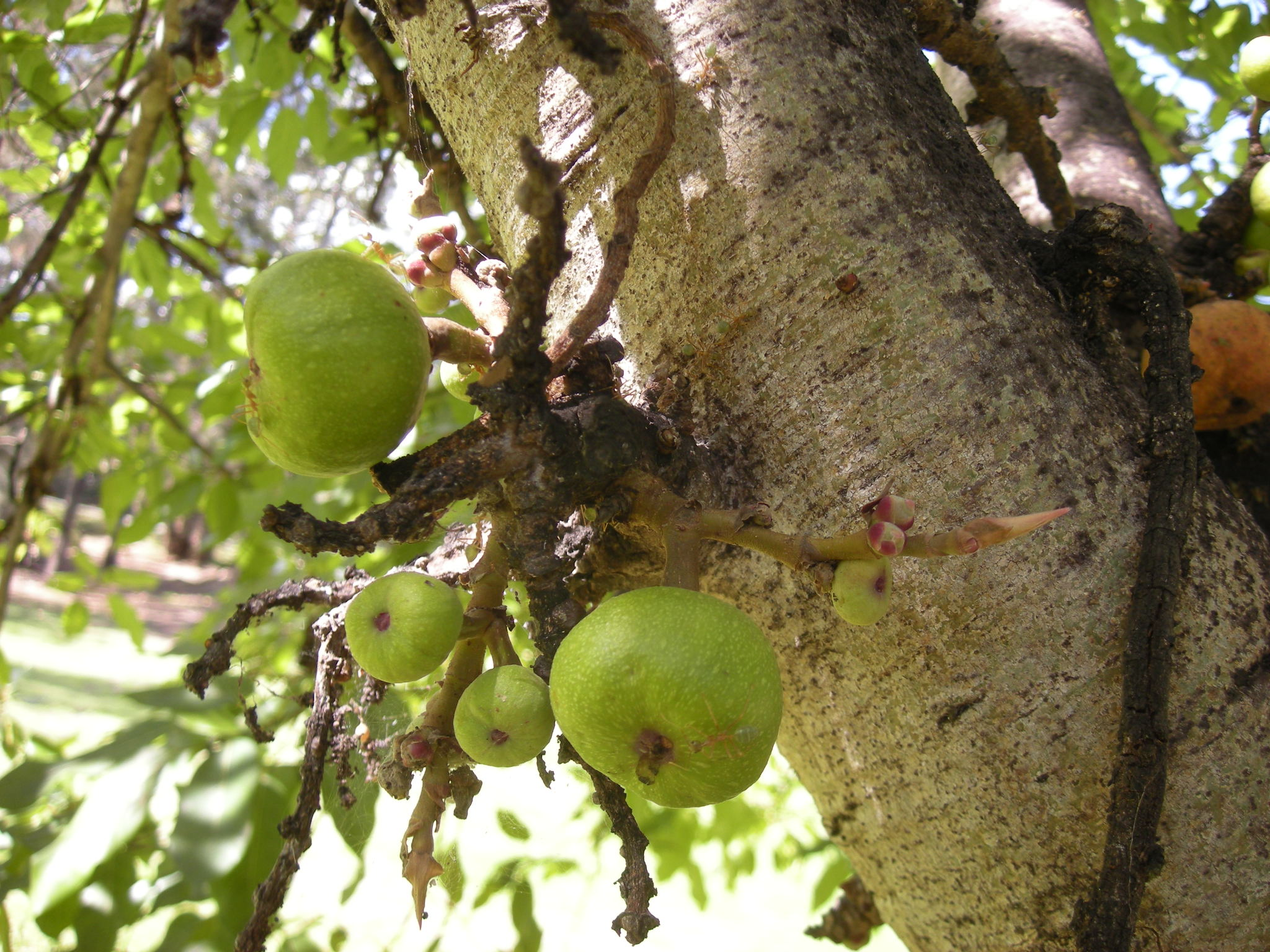
Ficus racemosa fruit

In Buddhism, udumbara (Pali, Sanskrit; lit. 'auspicious flower from heaven') refers to the tree, flower and fruit of the Ficus racemosa (syn. Ficus glomerata). In Buddhist literature, this tree or its fruit may carry the connotation of rarity and parasitism. It is also mentioned in Vedic texts as the source of wood for rituals and amulets.

The uḍumbara is also used to refer to the flower of the blue lotus (Nymphaea caerulea Sav.).

== Buddhist symbolism ==
=== Flowers ===
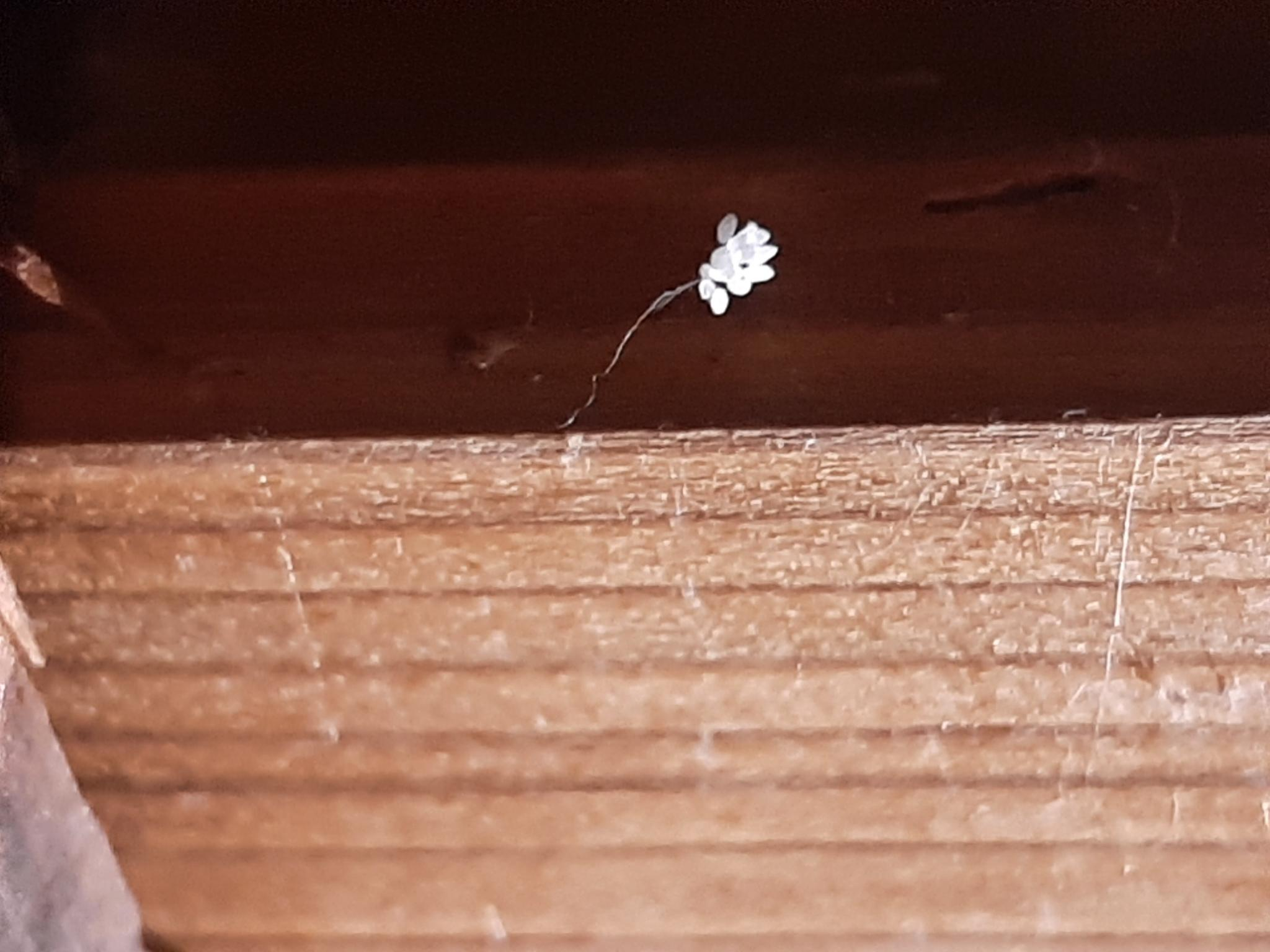
Alleged udumbara flower in Lyon, France

In some Buddhist texts, the flowers of the uḍumbara are enclosed within its fruit, as in all figs (see fig pollination and fig fruit). Because the flower is hidden inside the fruit, a legend developed to explain the absence (and supposed rarity) of the visual flower: in Buddhism, the flower was said to bloom only once every 3000 years and thus came to symbolize events of rare occurrence, such as the advent of a wheel-turning king or a Buddha. In early medieval Japan and possibly elsewhere this flower is believed to be capable of saving the lives of those dying from disease. It is mentioned in the Heian Japanese classic Utsubo Monogatari.

Allusions to this symbolism can be found in texts such as Theravada Buddhism's Uraga Sutta (Sn 1.1, v. 5) and Mahayana Buddhism's Lotus Sutra, both described further below.

A recent sighting of this flower in 2010 was reported by a Chinese nun, who could distinguish them from assuming it to be lacewing eggs because they omitted fragrance of sandalwood.

=== Strangling figs ===
The uḍumbara is one of several trees known as "strangler figs" due to their often developing as seeds dropped on the branches of a host tree (by animals eating the fig tree's fruit) and, as the branch-borne fig tree grows, it envelops its host tree with its own roots and branches, at times crushing and replacing the host tree. Based on this life cycle, the Mahārukkha Sutta (SN 46.39) likens "sensual pleasures" (kāma) to such fig trees, causing their human hosts to become "bent, twisted, and split" (obhaggavibhaggo vipatito seti).

== Sanskrit literature ==
According to Bhikkhu Bodhi, Vedic sacrifices used uḍumbara wood for many different ritual purposes such as a ladle and post, as well as amulets made of uḍumbara wood are mentioned in Vedic texts.

It is mentioned as the name for the Ficus racemosa in the Atharvaveda, Taittiriya Samhita, Aitareya Brahmana, Shatapatha Brahmana and the Mahabharata. In the Hindu medical text, Sushruta Samhita, uḍumbara is a name given to a type of leprosy with coppery spots. In other texts, it is a measure that equals "two tolas".

== Pali literature ==
In the Pali literature, the uḍumbara tree and its flowers are used concretely (as the tree beneath which a former Buddha gained enlightenment), metaphorically (as representative of a caste) and symbolically (evoking the insubstantiality of things and self).

=== Former bodhi tree ===
In both the Digha Nikaya and Buddhavamsa, the uḍumbara tree is identified as the tree under which the Koṇāgamana Buddha attained enlightenment.

=== Egalitarian emancipation ===
In the Majjhima Nikaya's Kaṇṇakatthala Sutta (MN 90), the Buddha uses the uḍumbara tree in a metaphor to describe how the member of any of the four castes is able to achieve the same quality of spiritual "emancipation" or "release" (vimutti) as a member of another caste:

[Buddha]: "I tell you, great king, that there would be no difference among them [the four castes] with regard to the release of one and the release of another. Suppose that a man, taking dry sala wood, were to generate a fire and make heat appear. And suppose that another man, taking dry saka (teak?) wood ... another man, taking dry mango wood ... another man, taking dry fig [udumbara] wood, were to generate a fire and make heat appear. Now what do you think, great king: among those fires generated from different kinds of wood, would there be any difference between the glow ..., the color ..., the radiance of one and the radiance of another?"

[King Pasenadi:] "No, lord."

[Buddha]: "In the same way, great king, in the power that is kindled by persistence and generated by exertion, I say that there is no difference with regard to the release of one and the release of another."

=== Archetype of nonsubstantiality ===
In the Pāli Canon's Sutta Nipata, the uḍumbara fig tree is used as a metaphor for existence's ultimate insubstantiality (in English and in Pali):

He who does not find core or substance in any of the realms of being,

like flowers which are vainly sought in fig trees that bear none,
— such a monk gives up the here and the beyond,
just as a serpent sheds its worn-out skin.

Yo nājjhagamā bhavesu sāraṃ
vicīnaṃ pupphamīva udumbaresu,
So bhikkhu jahāti orapāraṃ
urago jiṇṇamiva tacaṃ purāṇaṃ.

In the post-canonical Visuddhimagga (XXI, 56), the uḍumbara tree is again used to symbolize the "emptiness of all formations" (sabbe saṃkhārā suññāti, Vsm XXI,53):

Just as a reed has no core, is coreless, without core; just as a castor oil plant, an udumbara (fig) tree, a setavaccha tree, a palibhaddaka tree, a lump of froth, a bubble on water, a mirage, a plantain trunk, a conjuring trick, has no core, is coreless, without core, so too materiality ... feeling ... perception ... formations ... consciousness ... eye ... ageing-and-death has no core, is coreless, without core, as far as concerns any core of permanence, or core of lastingness, or core of pleasure, or core of self, or as far as concerns what is permanent, or what is lasting, or what is eternal, or what is not subject to change.

== Lotus Sutra ==
The uḍumbara flower of the Ficus racemosa tree appears in chapters 2 and 27 of the 3rd century Lotus Sutra, an important Mahayana Buddhist text. The symbolic nature of the uḍumbara is used in the Lotus Sutra to compare the unique occurrence of its bloom with the uncommon appearance of the Buddha and its doctrine in the world:

All Buddhas come into the world

But rarely, and are hard to meet;
And when they appear in the world,
It’s hard for them to speak the Dharma.
Throughout countless ages, too,
It’s difficult to hear this Dharma.
And those who can hear this Dharma--
Such people too, are rare,
Like the udumbara flower,
In which all take delight,
Which the gods and humans prize,

For it blooms but once in a long, long time.

Thích Nhất Hạnh places the flower in the context of enlightenment:

To see a fully awakened person, a Buddha, is so rare that it is like seeing an udumbara flower. In the Tu Hieu Monastery in Hue, there is a scroll which says: "The udumbara flower, although fallen from the stem, is still fragrant." Just as the fragrance of the udumbara flower cannot be destroyed, our capacity for enlightenment is always present. The Buddha taught that everyone is a Buddha, everyone is an udumbara flower.

== Udonge ==
The Japanese word udonge (優曇華) was used by Dōgen to refer to the flower of the uḍumbara tree in chapter 68 of the Shōbōgenzō ("Treasury of the Eye of the True Dharma"). Dōgen places the context of the udonge flower in the Flower Sermon given by Gautama Buddha on Vulture Peak. The udonge flower may be symbolic of mind to mind transmission between the teacher and the student, in this case, Gautama Buddha and Mahākāśyapa.

Udonge is also used to refer to the eggs of the lacewing insect. The eggs are laid in a pattern similar to a flower, and its shape is used for divination in Asian fortune-telling.

== See also ==
- Ficus racemosa - includes tree's representation in Vedic/Hindu texts
- Ficus religiosa - another significant fig tree in Indian religions
