= Betel chewing in Thailand =

Thai cultural tradition

Betel quid chewing has always been an important part of Thai culture and tradition. In the past, betel chewing was a popular daily activity among Thais all over the country. Betel comes from the plant known as Areca catechu, which grows wild all over Thailand and is known as หมาก (maak).

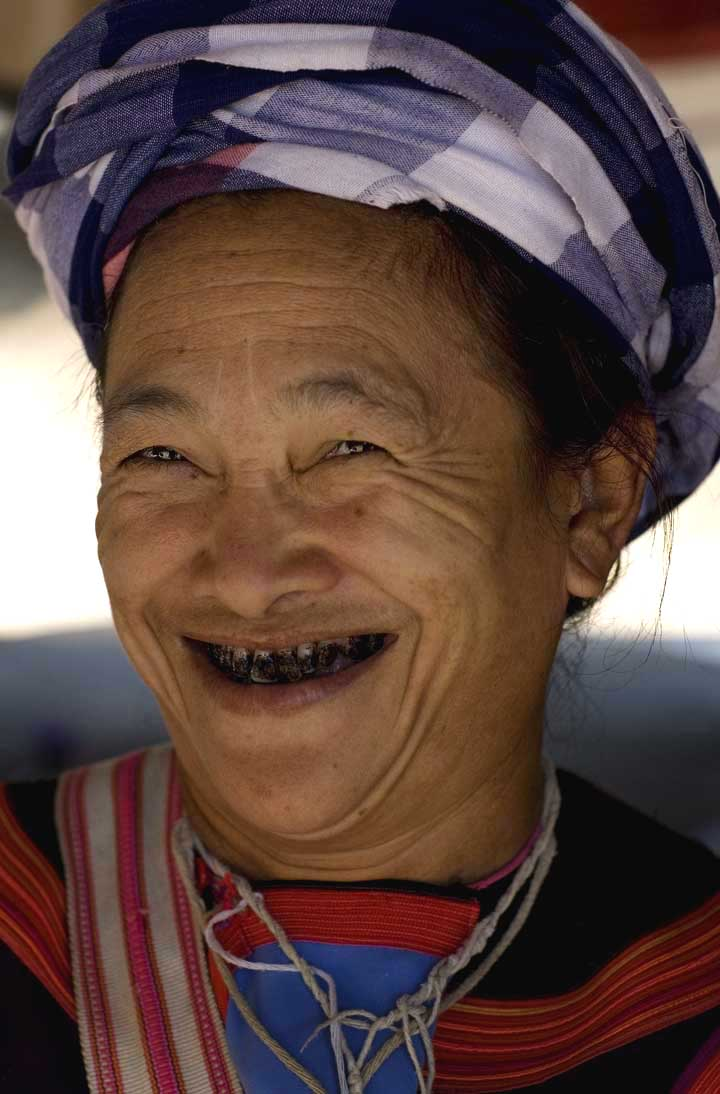
In a rural hill tribe in Northern Thailand, a villager smiles with stained teeth from her Betel Chew.

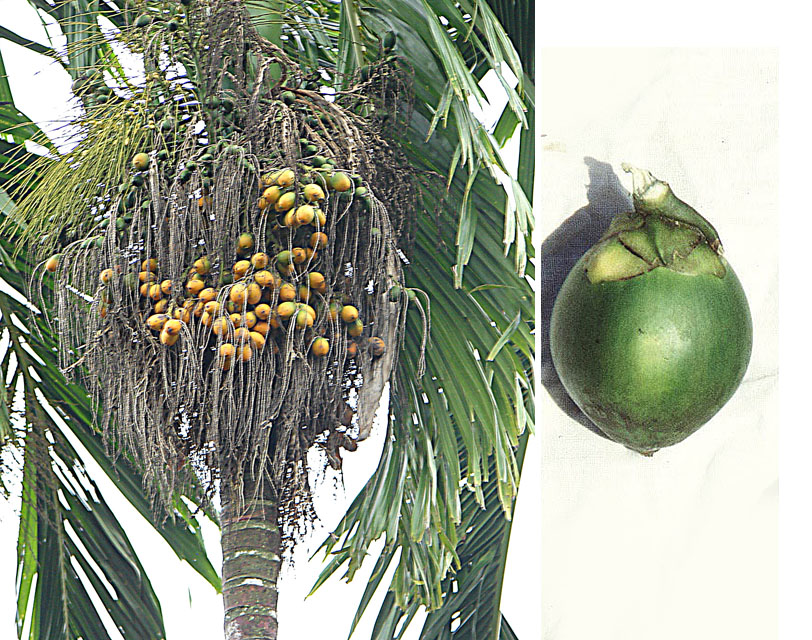
Areca Catechu (Betel plant), Betel nut

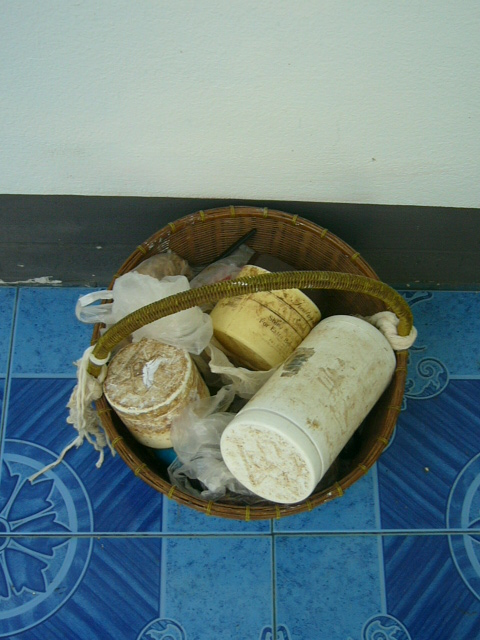
A kin mak basket

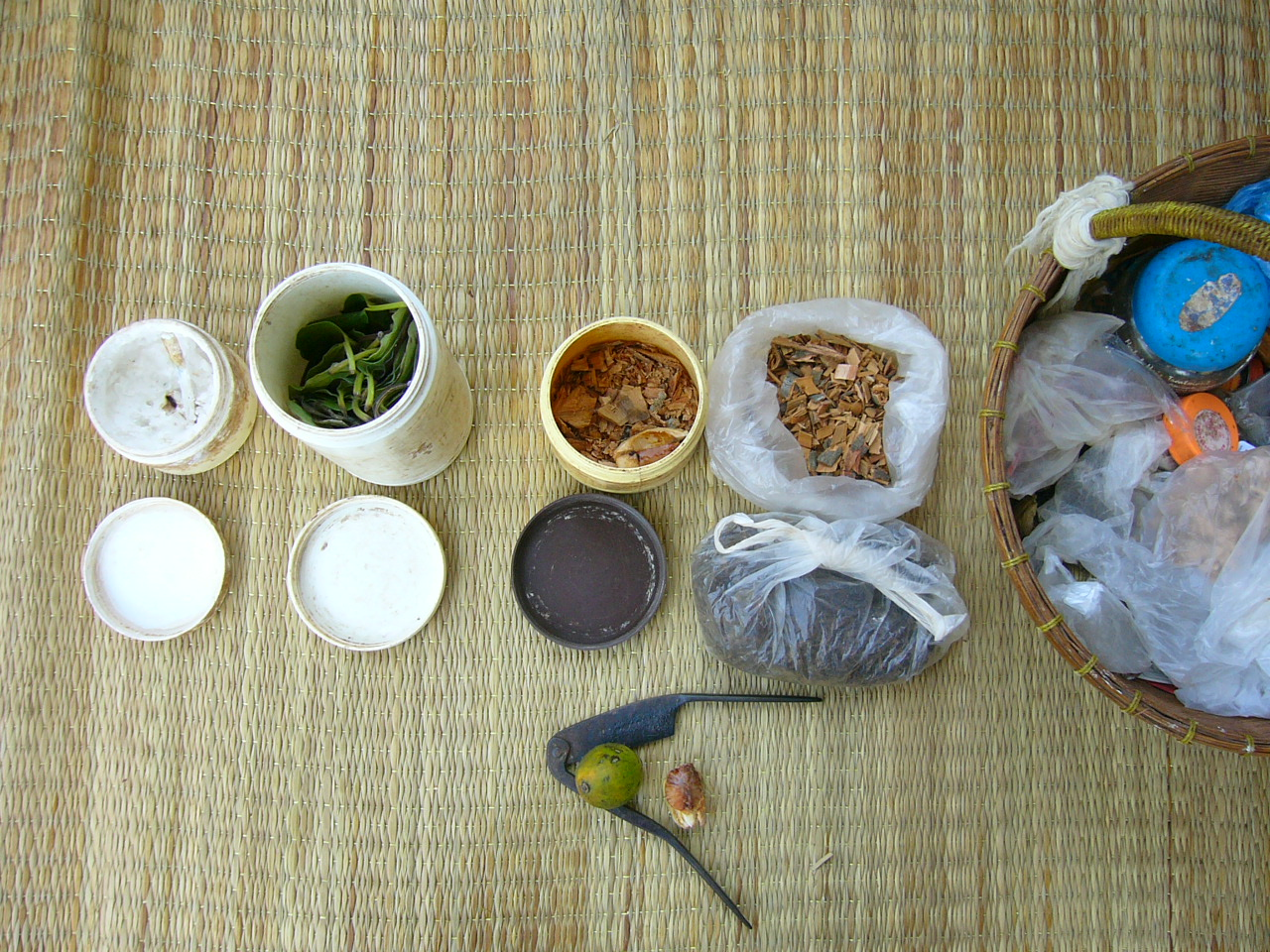
The picture above shows a betel kit and the main ingredients needed for a traditional Thai chew.

== Preparation ==
In order to chew maak the traditional Thai way, three main ingredients are needed: betel leaf, betel nut and red limestone paste. Before a betel chew, the betel nut is boiled, sliced and dried. A popular method is to cut the betel nut into four smaller sections before solar drying, since betel nut can be very strong. After the betel nuts have dried, they are normally laced on a string (usually as long as 50 cm) and hung around the house to use as needed; this is a popular method because the dried betel nut can be stored longer. Additionally, other ingredients can be added such as Plai (Zingiber Cassamunar) or Tobacco.

Before chewing on betel most Thais mix all the ingredients together. Many elders (with no or weak teeth) mix and pound all the ingredients to use without it being wrapped by betel leaf.

== Equipment ==
Chian maak is a betel kit, which consists of equipment essential for betel chewing. It comes in different shapes, sizes and material. In the past, it was a way of showing wealth and social class. Materials such as brass, silver, gold, and carved wood were popular among the rich, while peasants and common workers used baskets made from cheaper materials such as rattan.

A full betel kit has the following equipment:

- Mortar and pestle – used for pounding and combining ingredients together. This is popular among older people, since their teeth are weaker.
- Areca nut cutter
- Storage for ingredients (betel leaf, betel quid, limestone paste, etc.)
- Box for water residue

== Different names ==
The betel nut can go by different names such as: ‘หมาก' (maak) or ‘หมากพลู' (maak ploo). Maak is a Thai word, which traditionally meant fruit. Ten betel nuts laced on string is referred to as: ‘หมากไหม' (maak mai) or ‘หมากเสียบ' (maak sieb). Betel nut strings tied together: ‘หมากหัว' (maak hua) or ‘หมากพัน' (maak pun). Ten maak hua tied together is called ‘หมากหมื่น' (maak muen) or ‘หมากลุน' (maak loon).

== Thai traditions and ceremonies ==
Maak also plays a major role in Thai traditions and ceremonies such as:

- Life prolonging ceremony: There is a belief amongst Thais that maak can prolong life. This ceremony entails taking a small betel tree and casting spells on it before planting it at a temple or in a public area.
- ขันตั้ง/ขันครู (Kan Tung/ Kan Kru): Kan tung is a decorated tray that holds maak and other offerings during a ceremony where students show respect and gratitude toward teachers from both past and present.
- Buddhist rituals: Maak is used as an offering for spirit houses and during the ordination of Buddhist monks. Only leaves from male betel palm are used in Buddhist offerings.
- "Kan maak" (Wedding ceremony): According to Thai tradition, a couple becomes engaged during a ceremony called "Kan maak" which is held during a wedding. Kan maak is a decorated tray on which maak features predominantly.

== Tradition ==
Maak chewing has been a part of Thai tradition since the kingdom of Sukhothai (1238–1583). During the Lanna kingdom (1292), maak chewing was used as a form of flirting among the younger men and women. The red/brown stains on the teeth of those who chewed maak were considered beautiful. Other uses of the maak tree include the following. A common use of a maak tree is to use the branch for children to play with. A popular game is called ชักลาก (chuk lark), meaning pull and drag. This is a game where one person pulls on one end while another sits down on the wide end of the branch. The branch of a maak tree is strong; therefore people would use it for a hand fan. Another important use of the maak tree is to wrap food—such as rice. The tree branch is also used as an insulator to keep the moisture and warmth within the food. Additionally, the soft layer of the branch is also used to roll tobacco. Finally, Maak is also used as natural medicine among Thais. It is used to cure coughing, a sore throat or a rash.

== Declining trend ==
Plaek Phibunsongkhram, a former prime minister of Thailand promoted a campaign in 1940 to encourage citizens to quit the habit of chewing betel quid. He also ordered to cut down all the maak trees throughout the country. Maak chewing was also banned in government buildings. This started an anti-betel chewing trend; those who chewed Maak in government buildings were declined services from the government. This was to promote modern society and clean up the city because the people would spit red residue out onto the streets, which stained the cities and roads which was seen as dirty and unhygienic.

A detailed case study by Reichard et al. was made in 1979-84 of several hill tribes in northern Thailand, about habits of betel chewing in Thailand. The study suggested a preference ranging from 5-44% men and 9-46% women chewing maak. Very few villagers below the age of 35 participated in the chewing of betel quid, which was once a universal custom among Thais. This showed that betel quid chewing in Thailand was decreasing, which made it the only country in Southeast Asia to record such a trend. Maak chewing in big cities like Bangkok and Chiang Mai has almost completely vanished, although in rural provinces, betel chewing is still popular amongst elders.
