= Death and funeral of Bhumibol Adulyadej =

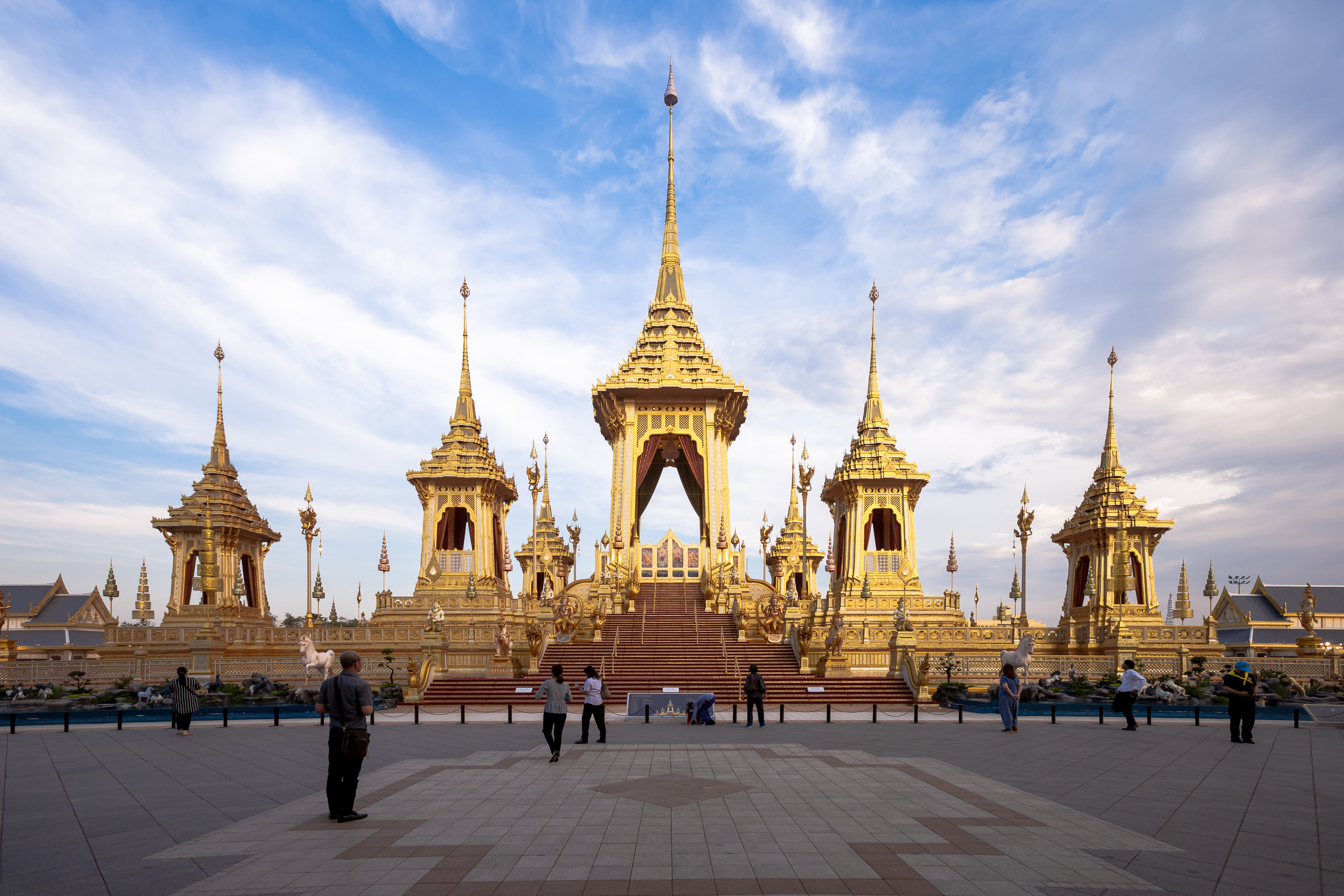
- Royal crematorium of Bhumibol Adulyadej
- Date: 13 October 2016, at 15:52 (ICT) (death); 14 October 2016 (bathing rite); 19 October 2016 (ceremony to mark 7 days since death); 27 October 2016 (ceremony to mark 15 days since death); 1 December 2016 (ceremony to mark 50 days since death); 20 January 2017 (ceremony to mark 100 days since death); 13 October 2017 (ceremony to mark one year since death); 26 October 2017 (cremation); 28 October 2017 (royal relics and ashes service of merit)
- Location: Siriraj Hospital (death); Phiman Rattaya Hall, Grand Palace (bathing rite); Dusit Maha Prasat Throne Hall, Grand Palace (funeral); Royal Crematorium, Sanam Luang (cremation); Phra Si Rattana Chedi, Wat Phra Kaew (temporary placement of the royal ashes); Chakri Maha Prasat Throne Hall, Grand Palace (interment of the royal relics); Phra Ubosot, Wat Ratchabophit (interment of the royal ashes); Phra Ubosot, Wat Bowonniwet Vihara (interment of the royal ashes)
- Participants: See § Participants

Bhumibol Adulyadej (Rama IX), King of Thailand, died at Siriraj Hospital in Bangkok on 13 October 2016 (B.E. 2559), at the age of 88. Bhumibol had suffered from ill health for several years and was the world's longest-reigning monarch at the time of his death. A year-long period of mourning was subsequently announced.

His royal cremation ceremony took place over five days at the end of October 2017. The actual cremation, which was not broadcast on television, was held in the late evening of 26 October 2017. Following cremation his remains and ashes were taken to the Grand Palace and were enshrined at the Chakri Maha Prasat Throne Hall (royal remains), the Royal Cemetery at Wat Ratchabophit and Wat Bowonniwet Vihara (royal ashes). Following burial, the mourning period officially ended on midnight of 30 October 2017 and Thais resumed wearing colours other than black in public.

== Illness and death ==
External videos
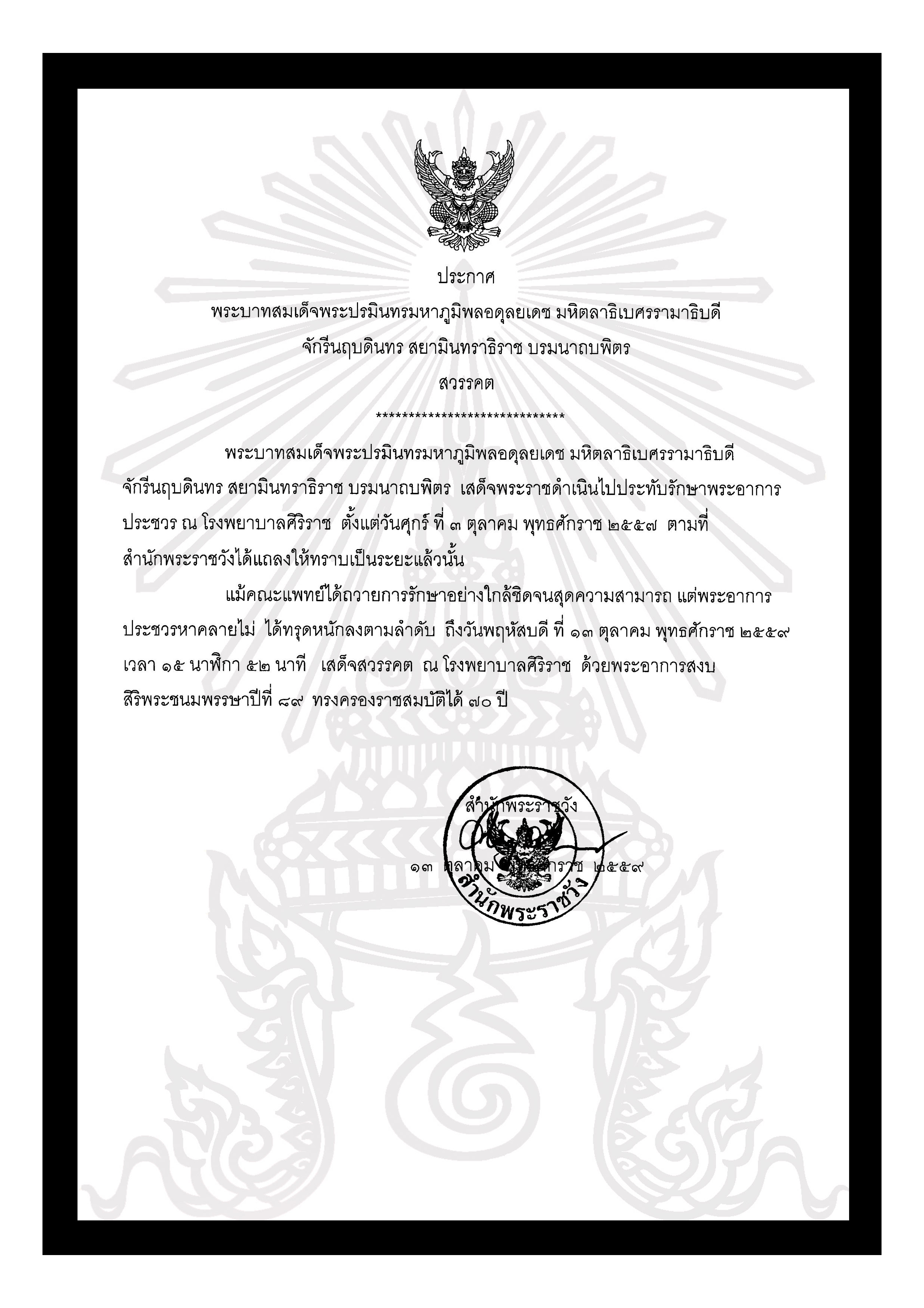
- Announcement of the death of the King by the Television Pool of Thailand (in Thai)

Bhumibol had been treated at Siriraj Hospital intermittently since 2009, and had resided at the hospital since October 2014. He developed a high fever due to sepsis in February 2016, which improved following antibiotics treatment.

On 1 October 2016, the palace released a bulletin stating that after recovering from a fever, Bhumibol underwent tests that revealed a blood infection and an X-ray found inflammation on his left lung, along with water in his lungs. He had been in kidney failure for some time and received dialysis. By 9 October, he had been placed on a ventilator and doctors pronounced him "not yet stable", recommending him to suspend his official duties. Crowds of well-wishers, many dressed in pink symbolising good health and luck, gathered outside Siriraj Hospital and the Grand Palace to offer prayers and support.

By 12 October, his condition became significantly unstable due to evolving acute hepatitis. The royal children had arrived at Siriraj Hospital and Crown Prince Vajiralongkorn had met with the prime minister. There were some internal concerns about the succession of the crown prince, in that he was not perceived to be as well-respected as his father and it was speculated that some palace elites, responding to the people's admiration for Princess Maha Chakri Sirindhorn, might try to position her to take the throne.

Bhumibol died at 15:52 ICT (UTC+07:00) on 13 October 2016. The Bureau of the Royal Household officially announced his death at 18:45, less than three hours later, although Scottish journalist and author Andrew MacGregor Marshall reported the death several hours before the official announcement by the royal palace.

== Funeral proceedings ==
Bhumibol's remains were carried by an autocade to the Grand Palace on the day after his death. His body left Gate 8 of the hospital around 16:30. As the cortege passed Arun Ammarin Road, Phra Pin Klao Bridge, and Ratchadamnoen Road, crowds of Thais, most clad in black and many openly sobbing, paid homage. Led by Somdej Phra Vanarata (Chun Brahmagutto), the abbot of Wat Bowonniwet Vihara, the autocade entered the palace via Thewaphirom Gate. Upon arrival at the palace, the body was given the bathing rite, presided over by the late king's son, King Vajiralongkorn. The event was broadcast live by the Television Pool of Thailand.

The general public were allowed to take part in a symbolic bathing rite in front of the king's portrait at Sahathai Samakhom Pavilion within the Grand Palace later that day.

=== Lying in state ===
The king's body lay in state at the Dusit Maha Prasat Throne Hall of the Grand Palace for a period of one year, with daily rites for a period of 100 days. As in the funerals of the king's mother and sister, the king's body was not physically placed in the royal funerary urn (kot) as was customary; instead, the coffin which housed the body was placed behind the pedestal displaying the royal urn. Special rites attended by King Vajiralongkorn were held to mark the 7th, 15th, 50th and 100th days since the king's death. After the fifteenth day, the public were allowed to pay their respects and attend the lying-in-state in the Grand Palace. By the end of the allowed public attendance on 30 September 2017 (later pushed forward to 5 October the same year), over 12 million people had paid their respects in person, a historic record crowd that, including foreign tourists and expats living in Thailand, broke all-time attendance records and left an estimated 890 million Thai baht in donations for the royal charity activities.

Special nationwide services in all Buddhist temples together with a general 100th day memorial service were held to mark the 100 day mark since his death on 20 January 2017 with King Vajiralongkorn presiding over the national service.

On 28 February 2017, a special Royal Kong Tek Chinese Buddhist ceremony was held, presided by King Vajiralongkorn at the Dusit Maha Prasat Throne Hall and was led by monks from the Thai Teochew Chinese Buddhist community in the Bangkok area. The service was in keeping with Chinese Buddhist rites and customs regarding the dead. The Kong Tek ceremony was a Buddhist religious ceremony unique to the Chinese wherein the deceased, together with his personal effects and clothing, was transferred ceremonially to the next life, with special prayers and chants sung by monks. The event was unprecedented since it was the first time such a ritual was held for any member of the Thai royal family in an official capacity.

== Cremation ==
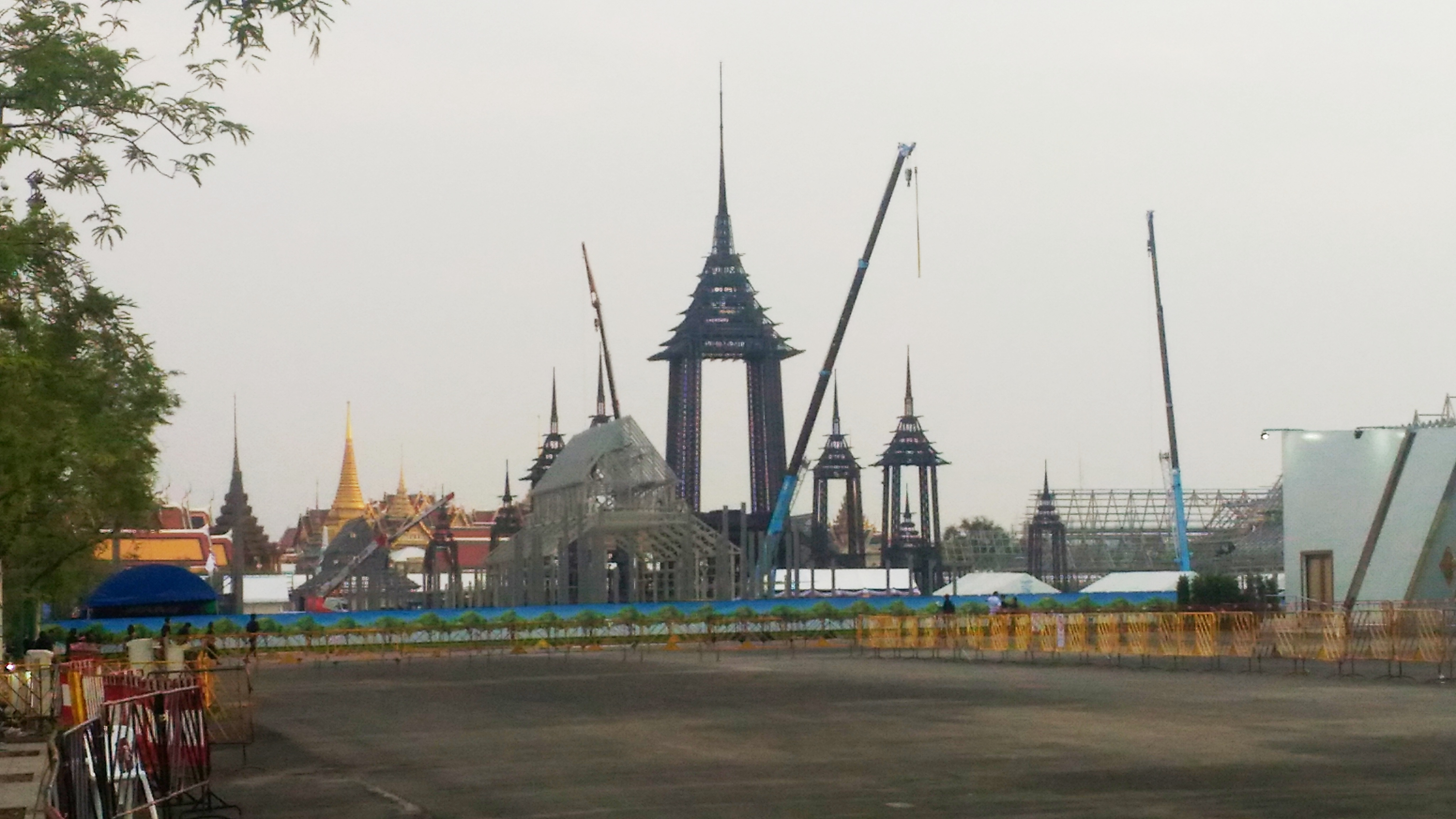
Bhumibol's crematorium under construction, as seen on 27 April 2017

The cremation took place at Sanam Luang, where the construction of an elaborate, temporary crematorium began in early 2017 and was completed in eight months. The government granted one billion baht, deducted from central budget, to cover its construction.

Designs for the cremation complex were officially unveiled on 28 October 2016, and a special ceremony was held on 19 December for the royal funeral chariots to be used at the Bangkok National Museum. The crematorium, known as the "Golden Crematorium" or Phra Merumas, was the largest and tallest since the state cremation rites for King Chulalongkorn (Rama V) in 1911.

On 19 November, the Ministry of Culture's Fine Arts Department head Anant Chuchote visited Nakhon Pathom, where the royal funeral urns have been manufactured for centuries out of old sandalwood trees. He asked for public support and assistance for the making of the royal urn alongside 150 artisans from the Traditional Arts Office. The department issued a job hiring call in the middle of January 2017 for prospective workers in the Sanam Luang royal crematorium complex and for the needed chariot repair and upgrading works.

As of 12 February 2017, the government pavilion and the Buddhist chapel were under construction. Concurrently, the Royal Thai Army began manufacturing a new royal cannon chariot for the state cremation ceremonies, a first after many years, timed to be completed in April 2017 for delivery to the Fine Arts Department of the Ministry of Culture. The designs of the buildings combine both Thai traditional and modern building design and construction methods.

The construction work for the complex officially commenced on 27 February 2017. A ceremony was held to mark the beginning of the construction process in the presence of Prime Minister Prayut Chan-o-cha. The crematorium's central steel beam was hoisted using a crane towards its spot in the plaza worksite after a Brahmin blessing was bestowed on it.

By 1 April, the crematorium complex area had seen construction work faster than the usual practice for royal cremations, with all buildings in the middle of the construction phrase earlier than expected. The FAD had also been tasked to undergo a major design remodelling for the main royal urn to be used in the ceremonies and an October date is expected to be chosen for the events. The cannon chariot, which was based on those used in British state and royal funerals, was officially finished by the end of the month and delivered to the FAD so that the decoration process can begin in time for their debut in the funeral events later in the year.

The national cremation in the Sanam Luang Plaza took place on 26 October 2017, one year and 13 days after the king's death. Just as in past state cremations since 1995, a special Khon performance was held in the plaza grounds, organised by The Foundation of the Promotion of Supplementary Occupations and Related Techniques of Her Majesty Queen Sirikit of Thailand (SUPPORT) and the Bunditphatthanasilpa Institute. Given the huge importance of such an event, the official practice runs for this began as early as 15–16 May with the RTA Ordnance Division spearheading the runs simulating the funeral procession of the major chariots at Saraburi province, with two military vehicles to serve as simulators. For the royal puppet show, it was the first ever to feature a woman performer in keeping with the modern age – Ancharika Noosingha, 43 years old, who was the first female royal puppeteer in history, keeping a historic tradition from the Ayutthaya period. The Fine Arts Department Royal Music and Drama Office organised the puppet play and its personnel form part of the cast who were scheduled perform on the cremation night.

The Nation reported on 11 May that the funeral crematorium and the monastic pavilion were almost ready for an early completion, the fastest yet for royal funerals in the modern era, and the prefabrication processes for the decorations to be used in the buildings were at the final stage. At the same time, the sandalwood corn flowers used for state funerals were made to be used by citizens and foreign attendants attending the services, as the kalamet flowers, protected by law, would only be used in the royal crematorium. The practice of making flowers from corn leaves was a modern practice which began in 1925 during the state funeral of King Vajiravudh (Rama VI).

As of 24 September more than 5,500 people signed up to volunteer to serve during the cremation. To encourage greater public participation, several Thai provincial capitals built replica crematoriums to serve people who were unable to travel to Bangkok to pay their last respects on the cremation date while both the public and tourists joining the events were offered free trips via the Bangkok MRT system and the BTS Skytrain lines, as well as the public ferries at Khlong Phadung Krung Kasem (Hua Lamphong-Thewarat Market) and Khlong Pasicharoen (Phetchkasem 69-Pratunam Pasicharoen) and the Bangkok BRT. The Ministry of Public Health was expected to deploy huge numbers of medical personnel to serve the public and foreign visitors during the cremation ceremonies and provide medical assistance. Media outlets were only allowed to relay live coverage from the state-run Television Pool of Thailand.

In early August, plans were finalised to open the cremation site for public and tourist visitation after the cremation ceremonies. The crematorium was intended to be eventually demolished in January 2018.

== Timeline of the royal cremation ==
- 15 May to 29 September – Practice runs for the chariot carriers, drivers and rope holders in Saraburi and later in Bangkok
- 23 May – 1st Service of Holy Merit at the Royal Plaza, Bangkok
- 9 June – 2nd Service of Holy Merit at the Royal Plaza, Bangkok
- 22 August – 3rd Service of Holy Merit at the Royal Plaza, Bangkok
- 21 September – National rededication ceremonies for the royal funeral carriages at the Bangkok National Museum
- 5 October – Final day for public visitation to the Royal Urn and coffin at the Dusit Maha Phasat Throne Hall of the Grand Palace, Bangkok
- 7 October – 1st General practice run of the funeral procession in Bangkok (from the Grand Palace to the Sanam Luang Royal Plaza)
- 13 October – National remembrance services in honour of the 1st anniversary of the death of King Bhumibol Adulyadej (Rama IX).
- 15 October – 2nd General practice run of the funeral procession in Bangkok
- 18 October – The ceremonial installation of the Royal Nine-Tiered Umbrella over the royal crematorium by King Vajiralongkorn (Rama X)
- 21 October – 3rd general practice run of the funeral procession in Bangkok
- 22 October – 4th and final practice run of the funeral procession in Bangkok and final practice run for the cremation services
- 25 October
  - 15:01 (UTC+07:00): Final afternoon and night vigil services before the Royal Urn and Coffin at the Dusit Maha Phasat Throne Hall of the Grand Palace, Bangkok
- 26 October – National cremation services
  - 07:00: Morning services of merit and farewell ceremony of the Royal Urn and Coffin
  - 09:00 – 14:00: Funeral procession from the Dusit Maha Phasat Throne Hall to the Royal Crematorium at the Sanam Luang Royal Plaza
  - 16:45: Afternoon memorial merit service
  - 17:30: Ceremonial first lighting of the funeral pyre and final honours by the 3rd Battalion, 1st Infantry Regiment, King's Own Bodyguard and the 1st Artillery Battalion, King's Guard on behalf of the Royal Thai Armed Forces (three-volley salute and 21-gun salute)
  - 22:00: Royal cremation proper and outdoor Khon and Nang yai performances, puppet show, musical concert and ballet performance starting at 1800h
    - Note: The cremation itself was not transmitted and was only made public by a press statement, although recordings of the cremation by mourners were subsequently uploaded on YouTube and Facebook.
- 27 October: Day of the removal of the royal ashes and relics
  - 07:00: Removal of the royal ashes and relics from the crematorium followed by a breakfast service
  - 08:30: Royal procession of the transfer of the royal ashes and relics to the Dusit Maha Phasat Throne Hall of the Grand Palace and the Temple of the Emerald Buddha
- 28 October
  - 17:30: Final service of merit before the royal relics and ashes and dinner
- 29 October – Official final day of the mourning period
  - 09:00: Morning service of merit followed by breakfast
  - 11:00: Departure honours of the royal relics and remains and procession
  - 11:35: Ceremony of interment of the royal relics to the Heavenly Abode Room, Chakri Maha Prasat Throne Hall of the Grand Palace
  - 16:00: Departure honours of the royal ashes
  - 17:40: Interment service of the royal ashes at the Royal Cemetery at Wat Ratchabophit followed by a procession to the Wat Bowonniwet Vihara Royal Temple and a final memorial interment service

=== Broadcast schedule for the Television Pool of Thailand ===
was livestreamed both in Thai and English via the official funeral website and FB page, NBT World and the Thai PBS and Channel 9 MCOT HD YouTube pages

- Wednesday, 25 October
  - 14:00 (UTC+07:00): Official beginning of the marathon bilingual coverage
  - 15:01: Final afternoon and night vigil services before the Royal Urn and Coffin at the Dusit Maha Phasat Throne Hall of the Grand Palace, Bangkok
- Thursday, 26 October
  - 07:00: Morning services of merit and farewell ceremony of the Royal Urn and Coffin
  - 09:00 - 11:30: Funeral procession from the Dusit Maha Phasat Throne Hall to the Royal Crematorium at the Sanam Luang Royal Plaza
  - 16:50: Afternoon memorial merit service
  - 17:31: Ceremonial first lighting of the funeral pyre and final honours by the 3rd Battalion, 1st Infantry Regiment, King's Own Bodyguard and the 1st Artillery Battalion, King's Guard on behalf of the Royal Thai Armed Forces (three-volley salute and 21-gun salute)
  - 18:00: Outdoor Khon and Nang yai performances, puppet show, musical concert and ballet performance
    - Spilt coverage across all channels and online:
      - Outdoor Khon and Nang yai performances: Channel 9 MCOT HD, RTA Channel 5 and Thai Global Network, TNN24, Spring News, Voice TV, Nation TV, Amarin TV and PPTV
      - Puppet show and Lakhon nai: Channel 3, Thai PBS and Thai PBS YouTube, Thairath TV, New TV, Workpoint, Now26, True4u and Thai Parliament Television
      - Musical concert and ballet: NBT and NBT World, Channel 7, Channel 8, Mono TV, One Channel, GMM25 and Bright TV
  - 22:01: Royal cremation proper
    (As stated earlier, not broadcast by the Television Pool nor live streamed)
- Friday, 27 October
  - 07:00: Removal of the royal ashes and relics from the crematorium followed by a breakfast service
  - 08:30: Royal procession of the transfer of the royal ashes and relics to the Dusit Maha Phasat Throne Hall of the Grand Palace and the Temple of the Emerald Buddha
- Saturday, 28 October
  - 17:00: Final service of merit before the royal relics and ashes and dinner
- Sunday, 29 October - Official final day of the mourning period
  - 09:00: Morning service of merit followed by breakfast
  - 11:00: Departure honours of the royal relics and remains and procession
  - 11:35: Ceremony of interment of the royal relics to the Heavenly Abode Room, Chakri Maha Prasat Throne Hall of the Grand Palace
  - 16:00: Departure honours of the royal ashes
  - 17:40: Interment service of the royal ashes at the Royal Cemetery at Wat Ratchabophit followed by a procession to the Wat Bowonniwet Vihara Royal Temple and a final memorial interment service

== Full order of the funeral procession towards Sanam Luang ==
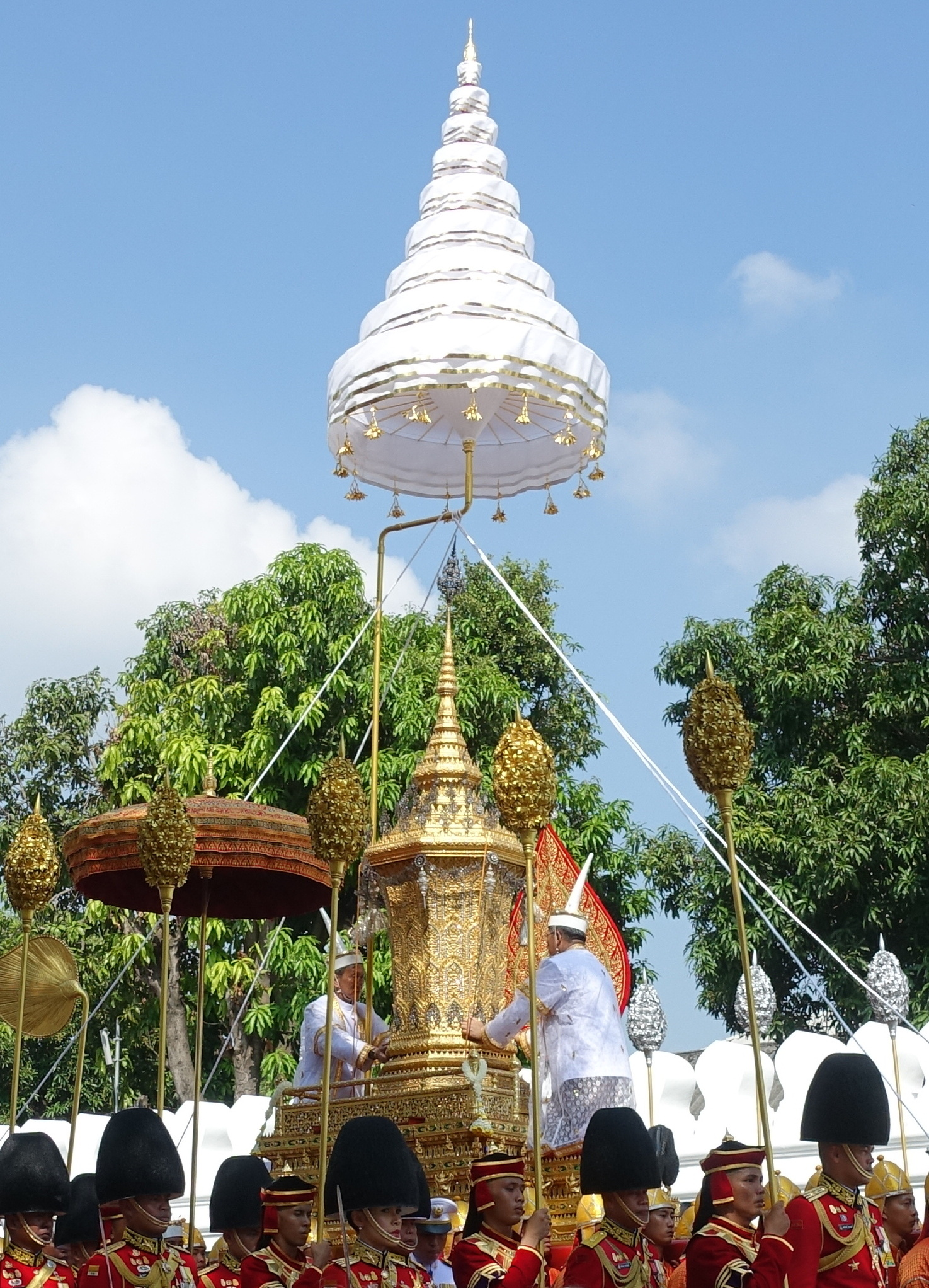
Royal urn of Bhumibol Adulyadej, being transported upon the Golden Palanquin with Three Poles (Phra Yannamas Sam Lam Khan), in the first procession of the king's royal cremation ceremony on 26 October 2017

=== From the Deva Phirom gate towards the southeastern end of the Grand Palace walls ===
- Two cavalry troopers from the Royal Thai Police
- Prakhom band from the Bureau of the Royal Household and 4 Court Brahmins from Devasathan Temple
- Clapper
- Gen (Rtd) Prayut Chan-o-cha, RTA, the Prime Minister of Thailand and representatives of the national royal funeral committee and Gen Thanchaiyan Srisuwan, RTA, the Chief of Defence Forces
- Parade commander and staff
- The Royal Funeral Palanquin (Phra Saliang Kleebbua) carrying the designated representative of Ariyavongsagatanana IX, the Supreme Patriarch of Thailand, carried by 16 servicemen of the Royal Thai Army
- Royal regalia and flower bearers
- Standard bearer of the Royal Flag of King Bhumibol Adulyadej (Rama IX)
- The Triple-Poled Royal Funeral Palanquin Carriage (Phra Yannamat Sam Lam Khan) carrying the symbolic Royal Urn, handled by 60 servicemen of the RTA and escorted by 48 Royal Guards and 16 pole bearers carrying gold and silver flower offerings, 8 on each side of the palanquin
- Delegation of the Royal Family of Thailand escorted by personnel of the 1st Infantry Regiment, King's Own Bodyguard
  - Royal Standard Bearers (The War Flags of Garuda and Hanuman)
  - King Maha Vajiralongkorn (Rama X)
  - Princess Maha Chakri Sirindhorn, the Princess Royal
  - Princess Bajrakitiyabha
  - Princess Sirivannavari Nariratana
  - Prince Dipangkorn Rasmijoti
  - Royal pages and assistants to the Royal Family
  - Chirayu Isarangkun Na Ayuthaya, Lord Chamberlain of the Royal Family and Household of Thailand
- Massed military bands of the 1st Division, King's Guard, First Army, RTA

=== From the Wat Pho Temple to the Royal Crematorium at Sanam Luang ===
- Two cavalry troopers from the Royal Thai Police
- 1st Massed military bands of the 1st Division, King's Guard, First Army, RTA
  - Band of the 1st Battalion, 1st Infantry Regiment, King's Own Bodyguard
  - Band of the 3rd Battalion, 1st Infantry Regiment, King's Own Bodyguard
  - Band of the 1st Battalion, 11th Infantry Regiment, King's Guard
  - Regimental Band of the Chulachomklao Royal Military Academy
- Parade commander and staff
- 1st Guards Regiment (Cadets)
  - 1st Battalion, Chulachomklao Royal Military Academy Cadet Regiment, King's Guard (Cadet students of the Royal Military Academy)
  - 1st Battalion, Naval Cadet Regiment, King's Guard (Cadet students of the Royal Naval Academy)
  - 1st Squadron, Air Cadet Regiment, King's Guard (Cadet students of the Royal Air Force Academy)
- Prakhom band from the Bureau of the Royal Household and 4 Court Brahmins from Devasathan Temple
- Royal horses and their handlers
- The Supreme Patriarch's Minor Royal Carriage (Ratcharoth Noi) carrying the designated representative of Ariyavongsagatanana IX, the Supreme Patriarch of Thailand, carried by 74 RTA servicemen and escorted by 16 fan holders, 8 on each side
- Royal regalia and flower bearers
- Gen (Rtd) Prayut Chan-o-cha, RTA, the Prime Minister of Thailand and representatives of the national royal funeral committee, and Gen Thanchaiyan Srisuwan, RTA, the Chief of Defence Forces
- Standard bearer of the Royal Flag of King Bhumibol Adulyadej (Rama IX)
- The Grand Royal Funeral Carriage/Royal Great Victory Carriage (Phra Maha Phichai Ratcharoth) carrying the symbolic Royal Urn, pulled by 216 servicemen of the RTA and escorted by 48 Royal Guards and 16 pole bearers carrying gold and silver flower offerings, 8 on each side of the wheeled chariot
- Delegation of the Royal Family of Thailand escorted by personnel of the 1st Infantry Regiment, King's Own Bodyguard
  - Royal Standard Bearers
  - King Maha Vajiralongkorn (Rama X)
  - Princess Maha Chakri Sirindhorn, the Princess Royal
  - Princess Bajrakitiyabha
  - Princess Sirivannavari Nariratana
  - Royal pages and assistants to the Royal Family
  - Chirayu Isarangkun Na Ayuthaya, Lord Chamberlain of the Royal Family and Household of Thailand
  - Other officials of the BRH
- 2nd Massed military bands of the 1st Division, King's Guard, First Army, RTA
- Representatives of schools and business establishments with royal patronage and of the late King's royal projects
- 2nd Guards Regiment
  - 2nd Battalion, 1st Infantry Regiment, King's Own Bodyguard
  - 5th Battalion, 11th Infantry Regiment, King's Guard

=== Procession at the Royal Crematorium at Sanam Luang ===
- Prakhom band from the Bureau of the Royal Household and 4 court Brahmins from Devasathan Temple
- Clapper
- Gen (Rtd) Prayut Chan-o-cha, RTA, the Prime Minister of Thailand and representatives of the national royal funeral committee and Gen Thanchaiyan Srisuwan, RTA, the Chief of Defence Forces
- Parade commander and staff
- The Royal Funeral Palanquin (Phra Saliang Kleebbua) carrying the designated representative of Ariyavongsagatanana IX, the Supreme Patriarch of Thailand, carried by 16 servicemen of the Royal Thai Army
- Royal regalia and flower bearers
- Standard bearer of the Royal Flag of King Bhumibol Adulyadej (Rama IX)
- The Royal Funeral Gun Carriage (Rajarot Puen Yai) carrying the symbolic Royal Urn, handled by 60 servicemen of the RTA and escorted by 48 Royal Guards and 16 pole bearers carrying gold and silver flower offerings, 8 on each side of the gun carriage
- Delegation of the Royal Family of Thailand escorted by personnel of the 1st Infantry Regiment, King's Own Bodyguard
  - Royal Standard Bearers (The War Flags of Garuda and Hanuman)
  - King Maha Vajiralongkorn (Rama X)
  - Princess Maha Chakri Sirindhorn, the Princess Royal
  - Princess Ubolratana Rajakanya
  - Princess Soamsawali
  - Princess Bajrakitiyabha
  - Princess Sirivannavari Nariratana
  - Prince Dipangkorn Rasmijoti
  - Princess Siribhachudabhorn
  - Princess Aditayadornkitikhun
  - Khun Ploypailin Jensen and Mr. David Wheeler
  - Khun Sirikitiya Jensen
  - Royal pages and assistants to the Royal Family
  - Chirayu Isarangkun Na Ayuthaya, Lord Chamberlain of the Royal Family and Household of Thailand
- Massed military bands of the 1st Division, King's Guard, First Army, RTA

== Participants ==
=== Foreign dignitaries at the Lying in state ===
Foreign dignitaries who visited the Grand Palace during the period of lying in state were as follows (by order of their visit):

Country	Title	Name	Date
Bhutan	King	Jigme Khesar Namgyel Wangchuck	16 October 2016
Bhutan	Queen	Jetsun Pema	16 October 2016
Bahrain	Prime Minister	Khalifa bin Salman Al Khalifa	18 October 2016
Singapore	Prime Minister	Lee Hsien Loong	21 October 2016
Maldives	Special Envoy of the President	Mohamed Saeed	21 October 2016
Malaysia	Prime Minister	Najib Razak	22 October 2016
Cambodia	Prime Minister	Hun Sen	22 October 2016
Cambodia	Deputy Prime Minister	Tea Banh	22 October 2016
China	Special Envoy of the President	Li Yuanchao	22 October 2016
Laos	Prime Minister	Thongloun Sisoulith	24 October 2016
Singapore	President	Tony Tan	24 October 2016
Indonesia	President	Joko Widodo	25 October 2016
Gambia	Special Envoy of the President	Bala Garba Jahumpa	25 October 2016
Vietnam	Prime Minister	Nguyễn Xuân Phúc	28 October 2016
Sri Lanka	President	Maithripala Sirisena	30 October 2016
Lesotho	King	Letsie III	2 November 2016
Myanmar	President	Htin Kyaw	9 November 2016
Philippines	President	Rodrigo Duterte	9 November 2016
Belgium	Special Envoy of the King	Nicolas Nihon	9 November 2016
India	Prime Minister	Narendra Modi	10 November 2016
Bangladesh	Special Envoy of the President	Tarana Halim	15 November 2016
Tonga	Crown Prince	Tupoutoʻa ʻUlukalala	15 November 2016
Timor Leste	Special Envoy of the President	Hernâni Coelho	16 November 2016
Russia	Special Envoy of the President	Andrey Klishas	30 November 2016
Bhutan	Queen Grandmother	Kesang Choden	20 December 2016
Bhutan	Princess	Pema Lhaden	20 December 2016
Japan	Emperor	Akihito	5 March 2017
Japan	Empress	Michiko	5 March 2017
Bahrain	King	Hamad bin Isa Al Khalifa	5 May 2017
Nepal	President	Bidya Devi Bhandari	12 May 2017
Lithuania	President	Dalia Grybauskaitė	14 May 2017
Chile	Special Envoy of the President	Eduardo Frei Ruiz-Tagle	1 June 2017
New Zealand	Minister of Trade	Todd McClay	24 July 2017
Australia	Minister for Foreign Affairs	Julie Bishop	3 August 2017
Hong Kong	Chief Executive	Carrie Lam	4 August 2017
United States	Secretary of State	Rex Tillerson	8 August 2017
Tonga	King	Tupou VI	27 September 2017
Tonga	Queen	Nanasipauʻu Tukuʻaho	27 September 2017
Bhutan	Queen Mother	Tshering Yangdon	6 October 2017
Bhutan	Queen Mother	Sangay Choden	6 October 2017

=== Dignitaries at the Cremation ceremony ===
==== Royal family and relatives ====
===== Thai royal family =====
- The King and Thanphuying Suthida Vajiralongkorn, the late King's son and his partner
  - Princess Bajrakitiyabha, the late King's granddaughter
  - Princess Sirivannavari Nariratana, the late King's granddaughter
  - Prince Dipangkorn Rasmijoti, the late King's grandson
- Princess Ubol Ratana, the late King's daughter
  - Khun Ploypailin Jensen and David Wheeler, the late King's granddaughter and grandson-in-law
  - Khun Sirikitiya Jensen, the late King's granddaughter
- The Princess Royal, the late King's daughter
- Princess Chulabhorn, the late King's daughter
  - Princess Siribha Chudabhorn, the late King's granddaughter
  - Princess Aditayadorn Kitikhun, the late King's granddaughter
- The late Princess of Naradhiwas's family:
  - Thanphuying Dhasanawalaya Sornsongkram, the late King's niece
    - Captain Jitat Sornsongkram, the late King's great-nephew
- Princess Soamsawali, the late King's niece by marriage (also former daughter-in-law)

===== Descendants of King Chulalongkorn =====
- The Hon. Sirina and Piya Chittalan, the late King's niece and her husband
  - Thara Chittalan, the late King's great-niece
- The Hon. Sarali Kitiyakara, the late King's niece
  - Suthakit Chirathivat, the late King's great-nephew
  - Sithikit Chirathivat, the late King's great-nephew
- Thanphuying Suthawan and Professor Surakiart Sathirathai, the late King's niece and her husband
  - Santithan Sathirathai, the late King's great-nephew
- Princess Bhanubandhu Yugala, widow of the late King's first cousin
  - Prince and Princess Nawaphansa Yugala, the late king's first cousin once removed and his wife
  - Princess Bhanuma and Meth Pipitpoka, the late king's first cousin once removed and her husband
- Prince and Princess Mongkolchalerm Yugala, the late king's first cousin once removed and his wife
  - Phra Mongkolsutdhiwong, the late king's first cousin twice removed
- Princess Srisavangvongse and Sakda Bunjitradulya, the late king's first cousin once removed and her husband
- Prince Chalermsuk Yugala, the late king's first cousin once removed
- Prince and Princess Dighambara Yugala, the late king's first cousin once removed and his wife
- Princess Malinimongkol Amatayakul, the late king's first cousin once removed
- Princess Padmonrangsi Senanarong, the late king's first cousin once removed
- Prince and Princess Chatrichalerm Yugala, the late king's first cousin once removed and his wife
  - The Hon. Padmanatda Yugala, the late king's first cousin twice removed
  - The Hon. Mongkolchai and Monrada Yugala, the late king's first cousin twice removed and his wife
  - The Hon. Srikhamrung Yugala and Major General Phatchara Rattakul, the late king's first cousin twice removed and her husband
  - The Hon. Chalermchatri Yugala, the late king's first cousin twice removed
- Prince and Princess Chulcherm Yugala, the late king's first cousin once removed and his wife
- Princess Nobhadol Chalermsri Yugala, the late king's first cousin once removed
- Princess Vudhichalerm Vudhijaya, the late king's first cousin

===== Descendants of King Mongkut =====
- Princess Prabhabandhu Kornkosiyakaj, the late king's second cousin
- Princess Bandhuvarobas Svestarundra, the late king's second cousin
- Princess Uthaikanya Bhanubandhu, the late king's second cousin
- Prince Viangvadhana Jayankura, the late king's first cousin once removed
- Princess Uthaitiang Jayankura, the late king's first cousin once removed
- Prince and Princess Charuridhidej Jayankura, the late king's first cousin once removed and his wife
- Prince Bhisadej Rajani, the late king's second cousin
- Prince and Princess Pusan Svastivadhana, the late king's first cousin once removed and his wife

===== Tishyasarin family =====
- Group Captain Virayudh and Chitsirin Tishyasarin, the late king's former son-in-law and his wife
- Air Chief Marshal Chaiyapruk Tishyasarin, former brother-in-law of the late King's daughter

==== Former vassal states royalty ====
- The Prince of Chiang Mai
- The Prince of Lampang
- The Prince and Princess of Lamphun, the late king's second cousin once removed and his wife
- The Princess of Nan
- Prince Vorachak of Kengtung

==== Privy Council ====
- General Prem Tinsulanonda, President of the Privy Council, Regent of Thailand (Oct–Dec 2016), Prime Minister of Thailand (1980–1988)
  - General Surayud Chulanont, Privy counsellor, Prime Minister of Thailand (2006–2008)
  - Phalakorn Suwannarat, Privy counsellor, the late king's second cousin once removed
  - General Thirachai and Lieutenant General Bunraksa Nakwanich, Privy counsellor, the late king's second cousin once removed and his wife
  - Air Chief Marshal Chalit Pukbhasuk, Privy counsellor, Acting Chairman of the Council for National Security of Thailand (2007–2008)
  - Suphachai Phu-ngam, Privy counsellor, President of the Supreme Court of Thailand (2004–2005)
  - Jaranthada Karnasuta, Privy counsellor, the late king's first cousin twice removed
  - Professor Kasem Watthanachai, Privy counsellor
  - Professor Atthanit Ditsatha-amnat, Privy counsellor
  - General Phaibun Khumchaya, Privy counsellor
  - General Daphong Ratanasuwan, Privy counsellor
  - Wirat Chinwinitkun, Privy counsellor
  - General Kampanat Rutdit, Privy counsellor
  - Admiral Phongthep Nuthep, Privy counsellor
  - Thanin Kraivichien, Former Privy counsellor, Prime Minister of Thailand (1976–1977)
  - Chao Nasriwan, Former Privy counsellor
  - Air Chief Marshal Kamthon Sinthawanon, Former Privy counsellor
  - General Phichit Kullavanich, Former Privy counsellor
  - Aumphon Senanarong, Former Privy counsellor
  - Admiral Chumphon Patchusanon, Former Privy counsellor

==== Royal Household ====
- Associate Professor Chirayu Isarangkun Na Ayuthaya, Lord Chamberlain
- Krit Kanchanakunchon, Director-General of the Department of Royal Secretariat
- Air Chief Marshal Sathitphong Sukwimon, Private secretary of the King

==== Executive ====
- General Prayut Chan-o-cha, Prime minister of Thailand, Leader of the National Council for Peace and Order of Thailand
  - Anand Panyarachun, husband of the late king's first cousin once removed, Prime Minister of Thailand (1991–Apr 1992; Jun-Sep 1992)
  - Chuan Leekpai, Prime minister of Thailand (1992–1995; 1997–2001)
  - General Chavalit Yongchaiyudh, Prime minister of Thailand (1996–1997)
  - Somchai Wongsawat, Prime minister of Thailand (Sep–Dec 2008)
  - Second lieutenant Abhisit Vejjajiva, Prime minister of Thailand (2008–2011)
  - Chavarat Charnvirakul, Acting Prime minister of Thailand (3–17 Dec 2008)
  - Niwatthamrong Boonsongpaisan, Acting Prime minister of Thailand (7–22 May 2014)
  - General Sonthi Boonyaratglin, President of the Council for National Security of Thailand (2006–2007)
- General Prawit Wongsuwon, Deputy Prime Minister, Minister of Defence
- General Thanasak Patimaprakorn, Deputy Prime Minister, Deputy Leader of the National Council for Peace and Order of Thailand
- Professor Wissanu Krea-ngam, Deputy Prime Minister
- Air Chief Marshal Prajin Juntong, Deputy Prime Minister, Deputy Leader of the National Council for Peace and Order of Thailand
- Admiral Narong Pipathanasai, Deputy Prime Minister, Deputy Leader of the National Council for Peace and Order of Thailand
- Professor Somkid Jatusripitak, Deputy Prime Minister
- Ormsin Chivapruck, Minister Attached to the Prime Minister's Office
- Suvit Maesincee, Minister Attached to the Prime Minister's Office
- Apisak Tantivorawong, Minister of Finance
- Don Pramudwinai, Minister of Foreign Affairs
- Kobkarn Wattanavrangkul, Minister of Tourism and Sports
- Police General Adul Seangsingkeaw, Minister of Social Development and Human Security, Deputy Leader of the National Council for Peace and Order of Thailand
- Atchaka Sibunruang, Minister of Science and Technology
- General Chatchai Salikulya, Minister of Agriculture and Cooperatives
- Arkhom Termpittayapaisith, Minister of Transport
- General Surasak Kanchanarat, Minister of Natural Resources and Environment
- Pichet Durongkaveroj, Minister of Digital Economy and Society
- General Anantaphon Kanchanarat, Minister of Energy
- Aphiradi Tantraphon, Minister of Commerce
- General Anupong Paochinda, Minister of Interior
- Suwaphan Tanyuvardhana, Minister of Justice
- General Sirichai Ditthakul, Minister of Labour
- Veera Rojpojanarat, Minister of Culture
- Teerakiat Jaroensettasin, Minister of Education
- Professor Piyasakon Sakonsattayathon, Minister of Public Health
- Uttama Savanayana, Minister of Industry

==== Legislative ====
- Professor Pornpetch Wichitcholchai, President of the National Assembly of Thailand
  - Surachai Liangbunlertchai, Vice President of the National Legislative Assembly of Thailand
  - Phirasak Phochit, Vice President of the National Legislative Assembly of Thailand
- Meechai Ruchuphan, Chairman of the Constitution Drafting Commission, Acting Prime minister of Thailand (May–Jun 1992), President of the National Assembly of Thailand (2006–2008)

==== Judicial ====
- Chip Chunlamon, President of the Supreme Court of Thailand
- Piya Patangtha, President of the Supreme Administrative Court of Thailand
- Nurak Mapraneet, President of the Constitutional Court of Thailand

==== Military ====
- General Thanchaiyan Srisuwan, Chief of Defence Forces
  - General Chalermchai Sitthisart, Commander-in-chief of the Royal Thai Army
  - Admiral Naris Pratumsuwan, Commander-in-chief of the Royal Thai Navy
  - Air Chief Marshal Johm Rungsawang, Commander-in-chief of the Royal Thai Air Force

==== Provincial Governors ====
- Police General Aswin Kwanmuang, Governor of Bangkok
  - The Hon. Sukhumbhand Paribatra, the late king's first cousin once removed, Governor of Bangkok (2009–2016)
- Sirirat Chumupakan, Governor of Amnat Charoen
- Wirawut Putraserani, Governor of Ang Thong
- Phisut Busayaphanphong, Governor of Bueng Kan
- Anuson Keawkangwan, Governor of Buriram
- Anukun Tangkhananukun, Governor of Chachoengsao
- Ronnaphop Luangphairot, Governor of Chai Nat
- Narong Wunsiw, Governor of Chaiyaphum
- Withurat Srinam, Governor of Chanthaburi
- Pawin Chamniprasat, Governor of Chiang Mai
- Narongsak Osottanakorn, Governor of Chiang Rai
- Phakharathon Thianchai, Governor of Chonburi
- Narong Phonlaeat, Governor of Chumphon
- Kraison Kongchalat, Governor of Kalasin
- Thatchai Sisuwan, Governor of Kamphaeng Phet
- Chirakiat Phumsawat, Governor of Kanchanaburi
- Somsak Changtrakun, Governor of Khon Kaen
- The Hon. Kitibodee Pravitra, the late king's first cousin twice removed, Governor of Krabi
- Songphon Sawattham, Governor of Lampang
- Ansit Samphantharat, Governor of Lamphun
- Chaiyawat Chuankosum, Governor of Loei
- Supakit Phopaphaphan, Governor of Lopburi
- Suapsak Iamwichan, Governor of Mae Hong Son
- Sanei Nonthachot, Governor of Maha Sarakham
- Phaithun Rakprathet, Governor of Mukdahan
- Natthaphong Sirichana, Governor of Nakhon Nayok
- Chanchana Iamseang, Governor of Nakhon Pathom
- Somchai Witdamrong, Governor of Nakhon Phanom
- Wichian Chantharanothai, Governor of Nakhon Ratchasima
- Thanakhom Chongchira, Governor of Nakhon Sawan
- Chamreon Thipphayaphongthada, Governor of Nakhon Si Thammarat
- Phaisan Wimonrat, Governor of Nan
- Suraphon Phrommun, Governor of Narathiwat
- Thanakon Ungchitphaisan, Governor of Nong Bua Lamphu
- Ronnachai Chitwiset, Governor of Nong Khai
- Phanu Yeamsri, Governor of Nonthaburi
- Phinit Bunleot, Governor of Pathum Thani
- Wiranan Phengchan, Governor of Pattani
- Sitthichai Sakda, Governor of Phang Nga
- Kukiat Wongkraphan, Governor of Phatthalung
- Prachon Pratsakun, Governor of Phayao
- Phibun Hatthakitkoson, Governor of Phetchabun
- Chattraphon Ratdutsadi, Governor of Phetchaburi
- Wirasak Wichitseangsi, Governor of Phichit
- Phakhaphong Thawiphat, Governor of Phitsanulok
- Suchin Chaichumsak, Governor of Phra Nakhon Si Ayutthaya
- Phongrat Phiromrat, Governor of Phrae
- Noraphat Plotthong, Governor of Phuket
- Suriya Amonrotworawut, Governor of Prachinburi
- Phanlop Singhaseni, Governor of Prachuap Khiri Khan
- Chatuphon Piyamputra, Governor of Ranong
- Chayawut Chanthon, Governor of Ratchaburi
- Surasak Chareonsirichot, Governor of Rayong
- Wanchai Khongkasem, Governor of Roi Et
- Phonphot Phetphat, Governor of Sa Kaeo
- Witthaya Chanchalong, Governor of Sakon Nakhon
- Chatchai Uthaiphan, Governor of Samut Prakan
- Praphat Malakan, Governor of Samut Sakhon
- Khanchat Tansathian, Governor of Samut Songkhram
- Bandit Thewithiwarak, Governor of Saraburi
- Phatharaphon Ratanaphichetthachai, Governor of Satun
- Suttha Saiwanit, Governor of Sing Buri
- Thawat Suraban, Governor of Sisaket
- Dondet Phatthanarat, Governor of Songkhla
- Phiphat Ekphaphan, Governor of Sukhothai
- Nimit Wanchaithanawong, Governor of Suphan Buri
- Witchawut Chinto, Governor of Surat Thani
- Atthaphon Singwichai, Governor of Surin
- Chareonrit Sanguansat, Governor of Tak
- Siriphat Phatthakun, Governor of Trang
- Prasert Luachathananon, Governor of Trat
- Sarit Withun, Governor of Ubon Ratchathani
- Watthana Phutthichat, Governor of Udon Thani
- Manrat Ratanasukhon, Governor of Uthai Thani
- Sathianphong Maksiri, Governor of Uttaradit
- Anuchit Trakunmuthuta, Governor of Yala
- Nikon Suksai, Governor of Yasothon

==== Other ====
- Police General Chakthip Chaijinda, Commissioner-General of the Royal Thai Police
- Professor Prasit Watthanapha, Dean of Faculty of Medicine Siriraj Hospital
- Professor Pradit Panchawinin, Director of Siriraj Piyamaharajkarun Hospital
- Dhanin Chearavanont, Senior Chairman of Charoen Pokphand
- Charoen Sirivadhanabhakdi, Chairman of ThaiBev
- Chalerm Yoovidhya, Co-owner of Red Bull GmbH
- Vichai Srivaddhanaprabha, Owner of King Power
- Thongchai McIntyre, singer
- Aniporn Chalermburanawong, Miss Universe Thailand 2015
- Phasut Banyeam, actor

==== Foreign dignitaries ====
===== Foreign royalty =====
====== Members of reigning royal families ======
- The Prime Minister of Bahrain (representing the King of Bahrain)
- The Queen of Belgium (representing the King of Belgium)
- The King and Queen of Bhutan
  - The Crown Prince of Bhutan
- The Crown Prince of Denmark (representing the Queen of Denmark)
- The Prince and Princess Akishino (representing the Emperor of Japan)
- The King and Queen of Lesotho
- The Hereditary Grand Duke of Luxembourg (representing the Grand Duke of Luxembourg)
- Princess Margaretha (representing the Prince of Liechtenstein)
- The Queen of the Netherlands (representing the King of the Netherlands)
- The Crown Prince of Norway (representing the King of Norway)
- Sheikh Thani bin Hamad Al Thani (representing the Emir of Qatar)
  - Sheikh Jassim bin Abdulrahman Al Thani (Ambassador of Qatar to Thailand)
- Queen Sofía of Spain (representing the King of Spain)
- The Queen of Sweden (representing the King of Sweden)
- The King and Queen of Tonga
  - Princess Lātūfuipeka Tukuʻaho of Tonga (Ambassador of Tonga to Thailand)
- The Duke of York (representing the Queen of the United Kingdom)

====== Members of subnational royal families ======
- The Sultan (Deputy King of Malaysia) and Raja Permaisuri of Perak (representing the King of Malaysia)
- Ahmed Nuhu Bamalli (Ambassador of Nigeria to Thailand)

====== Members of non-reigning royal families ======
- Rajkumari Lalitya Kumari of Jaipur, the late King's first cousin thrice removed

===== Other heads of state =====
- Peter Cosgrove, Governor-General of Australia, and spouse Lynne Cosgrove
- Julie Payette, Governor-General of Canada
- Christian Wulff, Former President of Germany (representing the President of Germany)
- Megawati Sukarnoputri, Former President of Indonesia (representing the President of Indonesia)
- Bounnhang Vorachit, President of Laos, and First Lady Khammeung Vorachit
- Htin Kyaw, President of Myanmar, and First Lady Su Su Lwin
- Halimah Yacob, President of Singapore, and First Gentleman Mohammed Abdullah Alhabshee
- Joseph Deiss, Former President of Switzerland (representing the President of Switzerland)

===== Heads of government =====
- Samdech Akka Moha Sena Padei Techo Hun Sen, Prime Minister of Cambodia (representing the King of Cambodia)
- Jean-Marc Ayrault, Former Prime Minister of France, and spouse Brigitte Ayrault (representing the President of France)
- James Bolger, Former Prime Minister of New Zealand (representing the Governor-General of New Zealand)
- (Eswatini) Barnabas Sibusiso Dlamini, Prime Minister of Swaziland (representing the King of Swaziland)

===== Other foreign representatives =====
- Shahriar Alam, Minister of State for Foreign Affairs of Bangladesh (representing the President of Bangladesh)
- Lim Jock Seng, Second Minister of Foreign Affairs and Trade of Brunei (representing the Sultan of Brunei)
- Zhang Gaoli, Vice Premier of China (representing the President of China)
- (Holy See) Giambattista Diquattro, Apostolic Nuncio to India (representing the Pope)
- M. J. Akbar, Minister of External Affairs of India (representing the President of India)
- Bhimsen Das Pradhan, Minister of Defence of Nepal, and spouse Bidya Banmali Pradhan (representing the President of Nepal)
- Khawaja Asif, Minister for Foreign Affairs of Pakistan (representing the President of Pakistan)
- Alan Peter Cayetano, Secretary of Foreign Affairs of the Philippines, and spouse Lani Cayetano (representing the President of the Philippines)
- Olga Yepifanova, Deputy Chairwoman of the State Duma of Russia (representing the President of Russia)
- Park Joo-sun, Deputy Speaker of the National Assembly of South Korea (representing the President of South Korea)
- Tilak Marapana, Minister of Foreign Affairs of Sri Lanka, and spouse Stella Marapana (representing the President of Sri Lanka)
- Fikri Işık, Deputy Prime Minister of Turkey (representing the President of Turkey)
- Jim Mattis, Secretary of Defense of the United States (representing the President of the United States)
- Đặng Thị Ngọc Thịnh, Vice President of Vietnam (representing the President of Vietnam)

===== Diplomatic representatives =====
- António da Costa Fernandes, Ambassador of Angola to Thailand
- Saida Muna Tasneem, Ambassador of Bangladesh to Thailand
- (Holy See) Paul Tschang In-Nam, Apostolic Nuncio to Thailand
- Adama Dosso, Ambassador of Ivory Coast to Thailand
- Ina Marčiulionytė, Ambassador of Lithuania to Thailand
- Anne Namakau Mutelo, Ambassador of Namibia to Thailand
- Asim Iftikhar Ahmad, Ambassador of Pakistan to Thailand
- Waldemar Dubaniowski, Ambassador of Poland to Thailand
- Andriy Beshta, Ambassador of Ukraine to Thailand
- Brian Davidson, Ambassador of the United Kingdom to Thailand
- Glyn T. Davies, Ambassador of the United States to Thailand

==== Religious figures ====
===== Buddhism =====
- Somdet Phra Ariyavongsagatanana, Supreme Patriarch of Thailand
- Somdet Phra Vanarata, Abbot of Wat Bowonniwet Vihara
- Phra Maha Kanachan Chin Thammasamadhiwat, Chief Abbot of the Chinese Sangha Sect of Thailand
- Phra Maha Khana Nam Thammapanyathiwat, Chief Abbot of the Vietnamese Sangha Sect of Thailand

===== Other =====
- Phra Maharajakhruphithi Srivisutthikhun, Chief Royal Brahmin
- Abdulaziz bin Ismail Aziz Phitakkumpon, Syeikhul Islam of Thailand
- Cardinal Michael Michai Kitbunchu, Former Archbishop of Bangkok
- Cardinal Francis Xavier Kriengsak Kovitvanij, Archbishop of Bangkok
- Minister Boonrat Buayen, President of the Church of Christ in Thailand
- Panchai Singhsatchathep, President of Siri Guru Singh Sabha Association

== Mourning ==
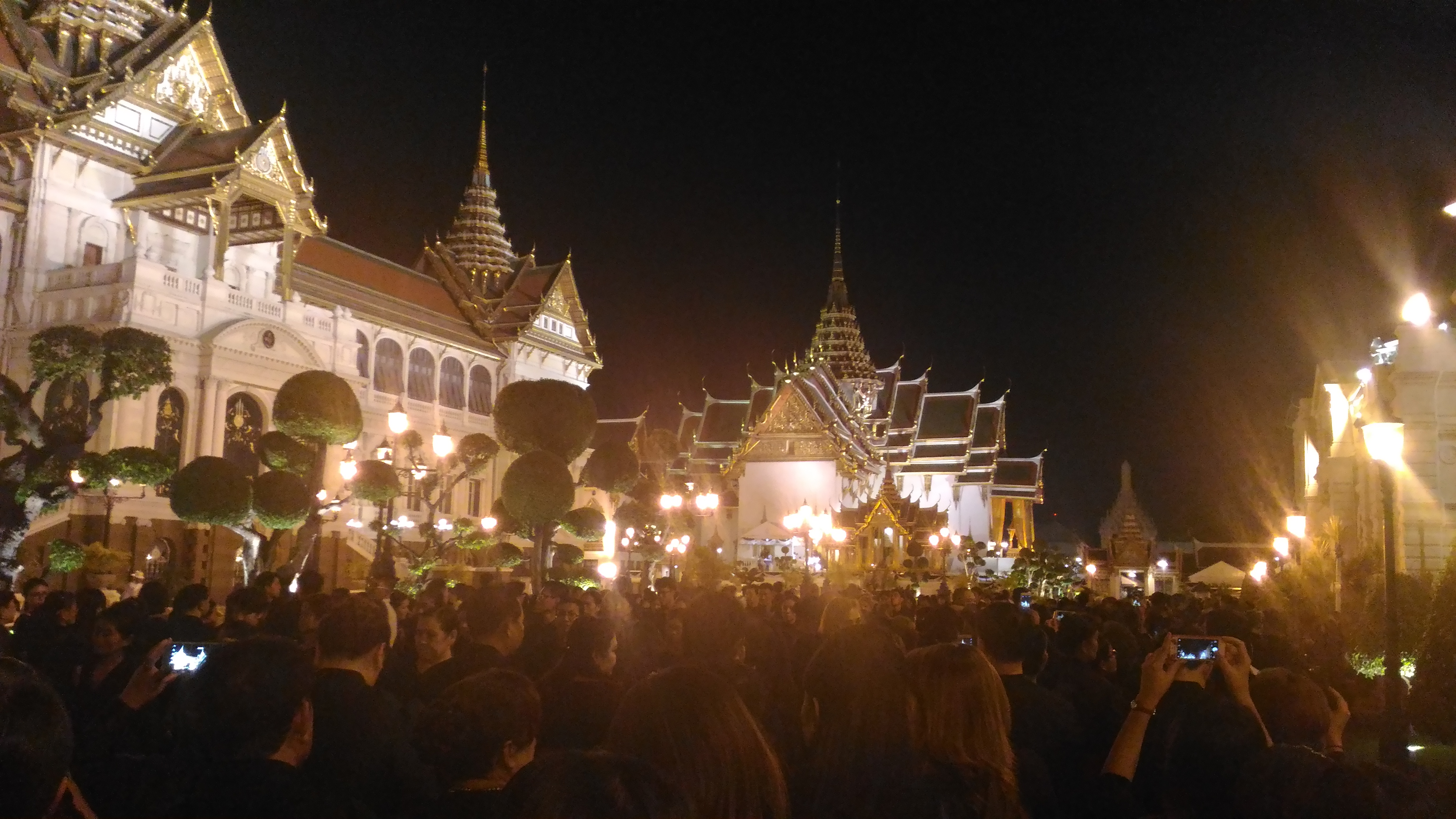
Thai people wait to pay homage to the King's body which lay in state at Phra Thinang Dusit Maha Prasat.

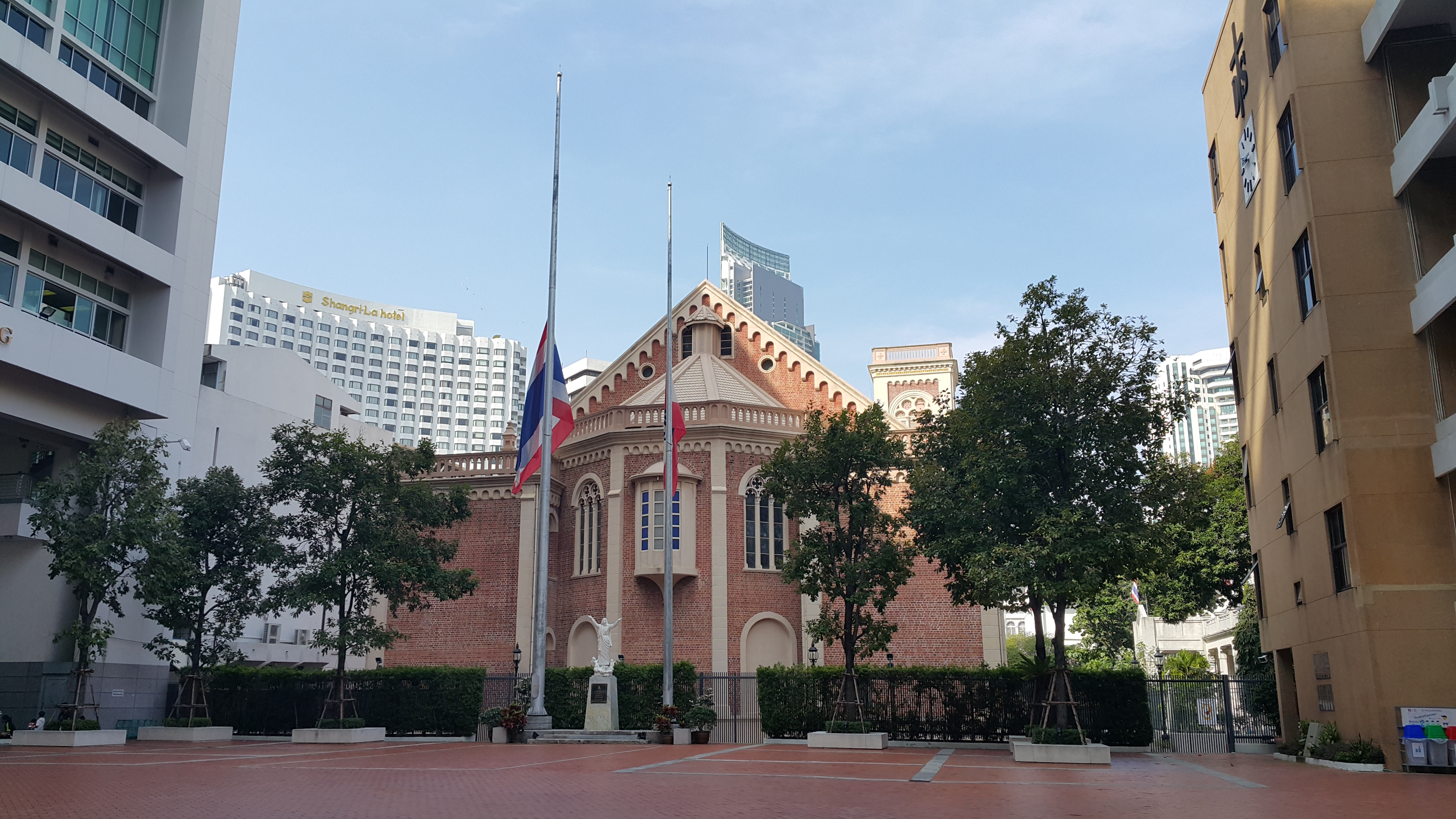
Thai national flag flown at half mast at Assumption College Bangkok during the mourning of King Bhumibol

The government declared a year-long mourning period for Bhumibol. Citizens were asked to refrain from participating in "joyful events" and entertainment for thirty days following his death; as a result, a number of events, including sports (such as the Thai League football season, which ended entirely), were cancelled or postponed. Entertainment outlets such as cinemas, nightclubs and theatres announced that they would shut down or operate under reduced hours during this period. The mourning period prompted concerns from Thailand's tourism industry, which felt that the mood of the country, as well as the cancelled events, would reduce interest in visiting Thailand.

Out of respect for the mourning period, many Thai malls, including all Central Pattana and The Mall Group properties, chose not to install extensive Christmas displays and decorations for the holiday season. Some installed memorials to Bhumibol instead.

Actions were taken against those who failed to wear black during the mourning period. In November 2016, Nangrong School in Buriram province seized colourful winter jackets from students and required them to wear those in mourning colours only. The students were reportedly distressed to lose their jackets due to the cold weather, and many did not own multiple warm articles of clothing. A director of a public school in Ranong province was also fired for not wearing mourning black on her first day at work.

== Reactions ==
Following the king's death, many Thais publicly displayed grief and paid tribute to him and his 70-year reign. Other world leaders and monarchs also expressed their condolences. Television broadcasters replaced their programming with monochrome tributes to Bhumibol as a mark of respect.
