= Thai royal cremation ceremony =

The royal cremation ceremony is the final and most major event during Thai royal funerals.

== Beginning of the cremation ceremony ==
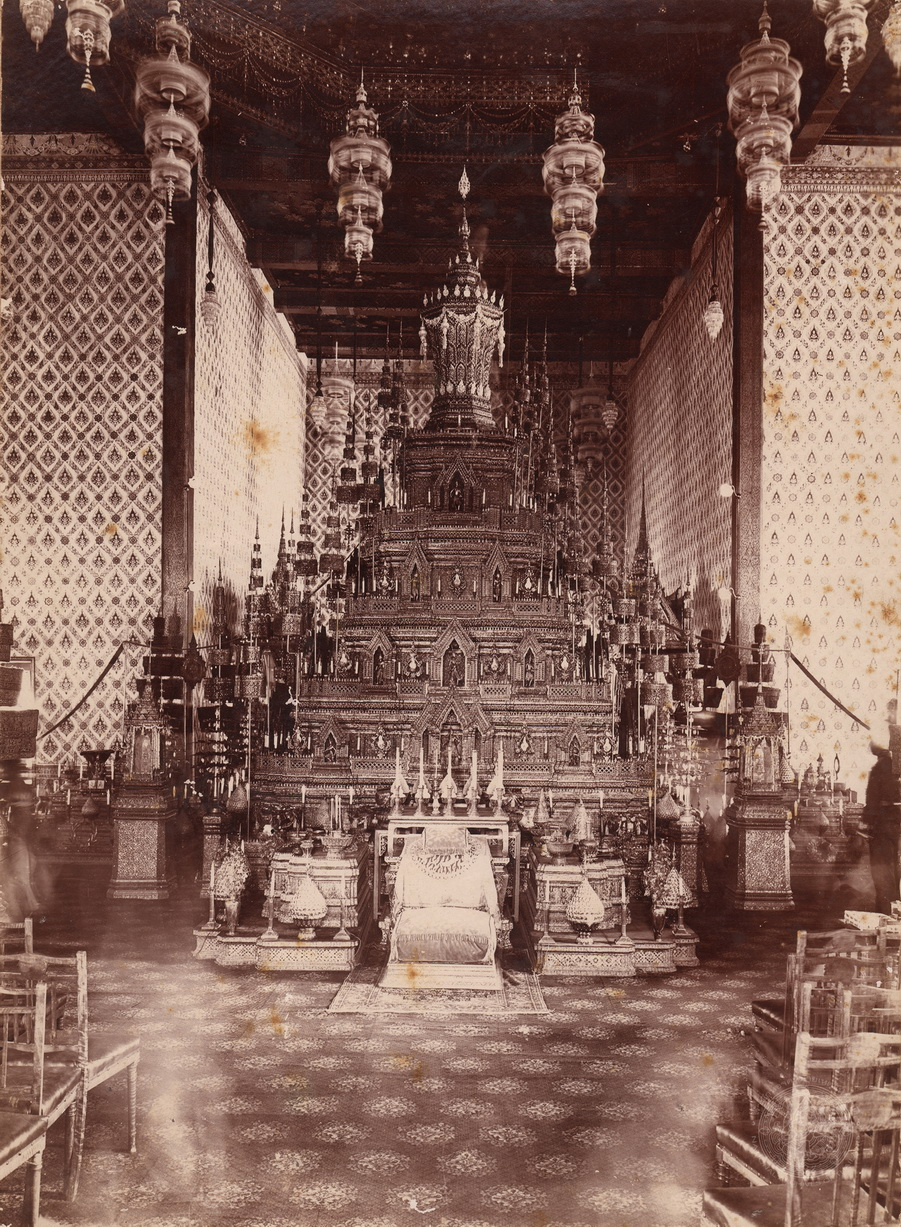
The royal urn of King Chulalongkorn, lying in state in the Dusit Maha Prasat Throne Hall of the Grand Palace

The cremation proper is preceded by a procession of the Buddha statues and icons and services before the relic urns of past monarchs and deceased members of the Royal Family. The cremation services last for 6 days (from the Friday before up to the Wednesday following). In the past, state funerals lasted a whole 2 weeks (14 days long).

Once everything is set for cremation as per Buddhist and Hindu customs, the cremation proper begins with one final late-night service for the deceased officially starting the royal cremation services. The services are held in Bangkok at the Grand Palace and its Dusit Maha Prasat Throne Hall, where the royal remains have been lying in state for a specific period of mourning in a kot (from Sanskrit kośa, meaning "container") displayed on a decorated pedestal known as bencha inside the hall. In recent funerals, a coffin was used instead of the kot to hold the royal remains, but a kot was still displayed near the coffin in keeping with tradition. The services are presided over by HM the King alongside members of the Royal Family, and Buddhist monks are present, performing the offerings of cloth on behalf of the dead, known as sadappakon, and reciting prayers and chants in Pali (and in recent state cremations, Teochew Chinese, due to the attendance of Thai Chinese Buddhist monks from the local community temples).

== Funeral procession ==
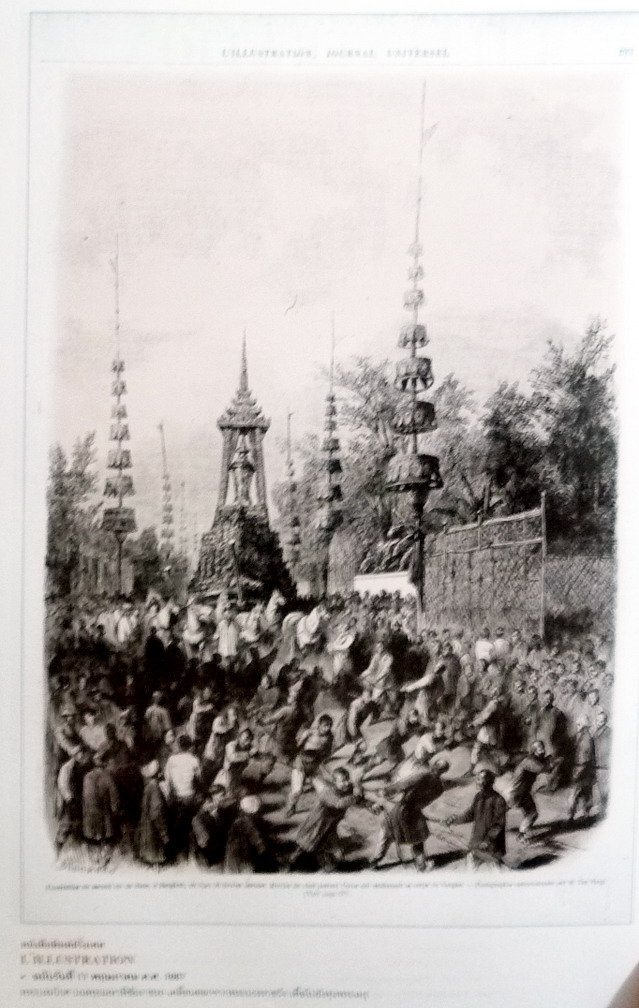
Transporting the King Pinklao's Funerary Urn upon the Royal Chariot of Great Victory

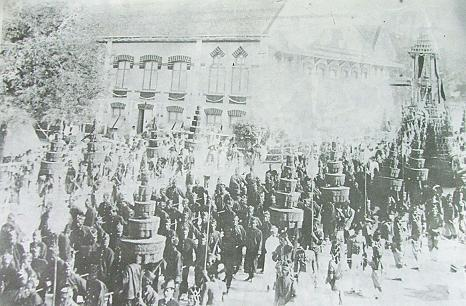
Royal funeral ceremony of King Chulalongkorn in 1911 at Sanam Luang, Bangkok.

After the final night service, on the cremation day a farewell morning service occurs at the Dusit Maha Prasat Throne Hall of the Grand Palace in Bangkok, where the urn lay in state for a specific time period and had been earlier stripped of its outer decorations by the phusa mala department of the Bureau of the Royal Household. After the morning service and breakfast served for the monks, a squad from 1st Infantry Regiment King's Own Bodyguard's 1st Battalion escort the urn out of the hall and into the gold Triple-Poled Royal Funeral Palanquin Carriage (Phra Yannamat Sam Lam Khan) outside the throne hall while honors are paid by the 3rd Btn, 1st Infantry Regiment (King's Own Bodyguard). As the covered funeral urn is placed on the carriage, an outer sandalwood cover is placed on it and the carriage, alongside a Royal Nine-Tiered Umbrella mounted atop it. After one more salute is rendered to the urn, the palanquin and the 60 Royal Thai Army personnel handling it move out of the Deva Phirom gate of the Palace from the west wall into Maharaj Road. A royal procession contingent of battalion size awaits the party, including members of the Royal Family, the Prakhom band under the Bureau of the Royal Household and bearers of the royal regalia, flags, banners and golden umbrellas, led by two cavalry troopers of the Royal Thai Police.

As the Funeral Palanquin Carriage meets the party and a member of the royal guards gives the signal via a clapper, the quick funeral march begins on Maharaj Road, turning left towards Tai Wan Alley and then marches towards the southeastern end of the Palace walls. Here a second, larger funeral contingent of regiment size awaits, as well as the Grand Royal Funeral Carriage (Phra Maha Phichai Ratcharot, also named as the Royal Great Victory Carriage) or the Lesser Royal Funeral Carriage (Vejayanta Ratcharot) and the Supreme Patriarch's Minor Royal Carriage (Ratcharot Noi). These are accompanied by the men and monks escorting them by Sanam Chai Street, nearby Wat Pho Temple, Saranrom Park and the Territorial Defense Command Building of the RTAF, at the eastern end of the Palace complex. The King's Guards guard the front and rear of the party and the royal relatives, students and businessmen form the rear contingents. As the first procession proceeds, a first Palanquin Carriage (Phra Saliang Kleebbua) follows with the Supreme Patriarch or his representative on top with monks and 16 handlers escorting the palanquin. Both processions are lined by cadets of the military academies and enlisted personnel and NCOs of the armed forces. A first gun salute follows the procession.

The first Gold Triple-Poled Royal Funeral Palanquin Carriage stops near the Grand Royal Funeral Carriage and its handlers unload the urn, transferring it to the royal conveyor pulley (kroen bandai nak) in the presence of the Royal Family, while a second Royal Nine-Tiered Umbrella, larger in size, is mounted. Then the first Gold Triple-Poled Royal Funeral Palaquin Carriage and its handlers march off. Prayers are then said by monks, and then the urn, escorted by an attendant in traditional uniforms, is transferred to the Grand Royal Funeral Carriage where its 6 escorts, 216 military handlers and 10 pulley staff (plus the 48 King's Guards escorts and 16 pole bearers from the first procession) are assembled. Once the urn is placed atop the carriage and is placed on the butsabok (open-sided roofed structure), a Royal Salute is rendered at this moment (and the massed military bands play Sansoen Phra Barami for the King and Queen or Maha Chai for senior members of the royal family). Two additional attendants say prayers at the south and north of the urn, while the Supreme Patriarch (or in his absence his representative) mounts the Ratcharot Noi carrying Buddhist scriptures to read while 74 military handlers pull the ropes. With a clapper sounded and the bugler playing a bugle call, the slow royal funeral march starts with the Traditional Prakhom Band playing traditional songs and the massed bands playing the slow funeral march Phayasok, composed by His late Royal Highness Prince Nagor Svarga. The Royal Family proceeds at the rear of the funeral carriage, which moves along Sanam Chai Street, then forward across Ratchadamnoen Avenue and towards the Sanam Luang Royal Square and the crematorium area in either the southern or northern portion of the field (where the funeral urn is stationed). During the entire march, a 21-gun salute is fired, at one-minute intervals, by the 1st Artillery Regiment King's Guard if the King or Queen is being cremated (19 for senior members of the Royal Family). Following the royal urn are senior-ranked members of the royal family and the royal pages and attendants, while the urn is preceded by the Prime Minister of Thailand and representatives of the state cabinet.

As the royal funeral procession halts on the northwest end of the royal crematorium, the urn is transferred from the Grand Royal Funeral Carriage via a second pulley into either a second Gold Triple-Poled Royal Funeral Palanquin Carriage or to the Royal Gun Carriage (Rajarot Puen Yai) (for kings who held the title of Head of the Armed Forces or royal family members holding high military ranks in the Royal Thai Armed Forces, a tradition initiated on the wishes of King Vajiravudh in 1926 in keeping with the British precedence of the Royal Navy State Funeral Gun Carriage) either of which with a 3rd Royal Nine-Tiered Umbrella attached on it. Upon this happening, the King's Guard render one more Royal Salute as a final procession starts upon the signal from the clapper. Most of the remainder of the funeral party, together with the Supreme Patriarch mounted on a second Palaquin Carriage, march counter-clockwise encircling the crematorium (Merumas after the Hindu-Buddhist Mount Meru) thrice, ending on the third march around. The carriage is unloaded, the urn is placed at a pulley with an escorting attendant, and transferred to a special funeral pyre inside the building while two piphat ensembles play traditional funeral music as the urn and coffin are brought to their places. Everyone in the main funeral party takes their leave for lunch.

== Cremation proper ==
A further memorial service is held in the late afternoon and in the early evening the ceremonial and symbolic first lighting of the funeral pyre is held. As the Royal Family pay their last respects and place sandalwood flowers on the pyre, preceded by the buglers playing the Last Post, the 1st and 3rd Battalions, 1st Infantry Regiment "King's Own Bodyguards", and the 5th Battalion, 11th Infantry Regiment, King's Guard all mount one last Royal Salute, followed by a three-volley rifle salute and the gun salute as the band plays Phayasok one final time. Designated areas around Bangkok and nationwide offer the general public and tourists to place the traditional sandalwood flower wreaths as a sign of remembrance while the honor guards march off the crematorium area. At around 10pm the cremation proper starts as the urn or coffin of the deceased is transferred, and during the royal cremation ceremonies in 2008 and 2012, to the hydraulic tappet pyre east of the funeral pyre for cremation while the outer covering of the urn is removed beforehand. In the case of the cremation of Princess Bejaratana in 2012, who requested to be interred in the kot according to tradition, a modified cremation furnace was deployed to accommodate the kot instead of the coffin. At this time, to mark the end of the mourning period traditional Thai dances and opera are performed (a tradition reinstated in 1995). The actual cremation of the urn and/or coffin was held in the center of the crematorium was last held in 1995 before reinstated during the royal cremation of King Bhumibol and Queen Mother Sirikit, where the electric cremation furnace is located right below the pyre instead and the coffin was moved down to the furnace underneath.

== Post-cremation period ==
On the day after the cremation, representatives of the Royal Family receive a memorial urn (phra kot phra atthi) with select ashes and relics (atthi) of the deceased mixed with flower petals, with a second urn (pha-op) carrying the rest of the royal ashes (sarirangkhan) . Both are obtained from the cremation pyre, and prayers and monastic robes are offered first in an early morning ceremony before both the relics and ashes are removed from the pyre. Usually the King or Crown Prince, if present, is the first to symbolically transfer the bones to the urn. As the urn is enthroned at the monastic pavilion, a breakfast service is held and the Royal Family thanks all the monks who led and assisted in the memorial services. After this, one more procession on the Gold Royal Four-poled Funeral Palaquin (Rajendrayan, only for the King) or the Gold Triple-Poled Royal Funeral Palaquin Carriage (for senior-ranked royalty) carries the sacred urns with the ashes and relics from the Sanam Luang Square to the Dustin Maha Prasat Throne Hall of the Grand Palace, where one last memorial service is held the following day for the royal relics, and to the Temple of the Emerald Buddha. This is followed by the transfer of the sacred urn to the Chakri Maha Prasat Throne Hall where it will be enthroned, ending the cremation services. To signify this, the Royal Family wears their ceremonial uniforms at this time, and not black dresses or black armbands with white court dress. The public also follows suit by wearing normal clothes. One final service is held later at an important royal temple in Bangkok (for the King or Queen) or for senior or junior-ranked members of the Royal Family at the Royal Cemetery at Wat Ratchabophit (inside the Wat Ratchabophit complex itself), where the rest of the ashes are interred in the Royal Family's presence. In recent years, the final procession to the interment temple is a motorized one, with a ceremonial mounted troop from the 29th Cavalry Squadron, King's Guard escorting the vehicle where the royal ashes are carried, which before departure had been loaded from the Temple of the Emerald Buddha where these had been temporarily placed on the day following the royal cremation. As a reminder of this, the Sanam Luang crematorium will be later dismantled and the decorations and awards of the deceased removed from the Dusit Maha Prasat Throne Hall, together with the wreaths that had been placed on the funeral pedestal before.

== Gallery ==
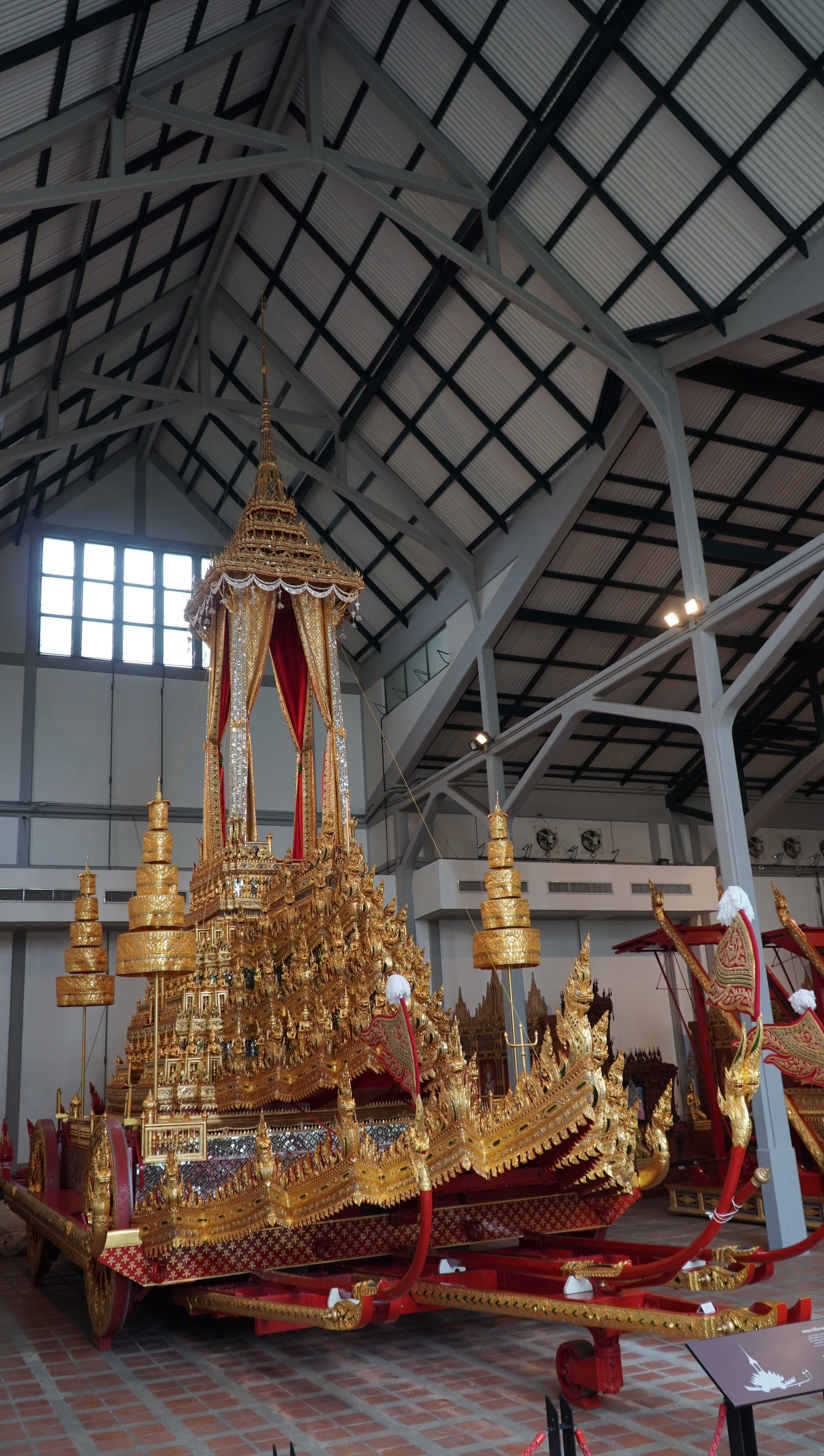
Royal Chariot of Great Victory (มหาพิชัยราชรถ)

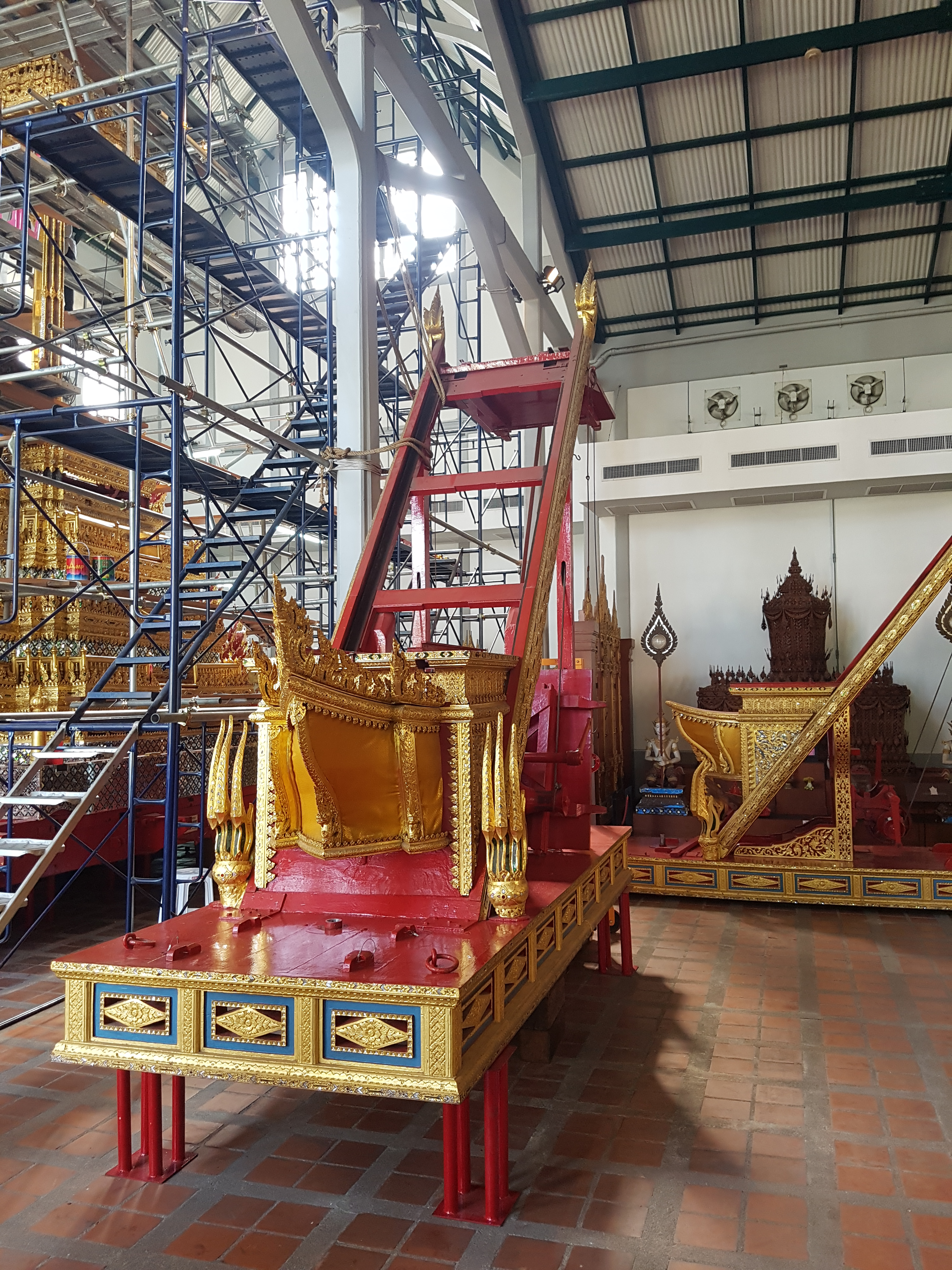
Kroen bandai nak (เกรินบันไดนาค, "hoist of serpents")

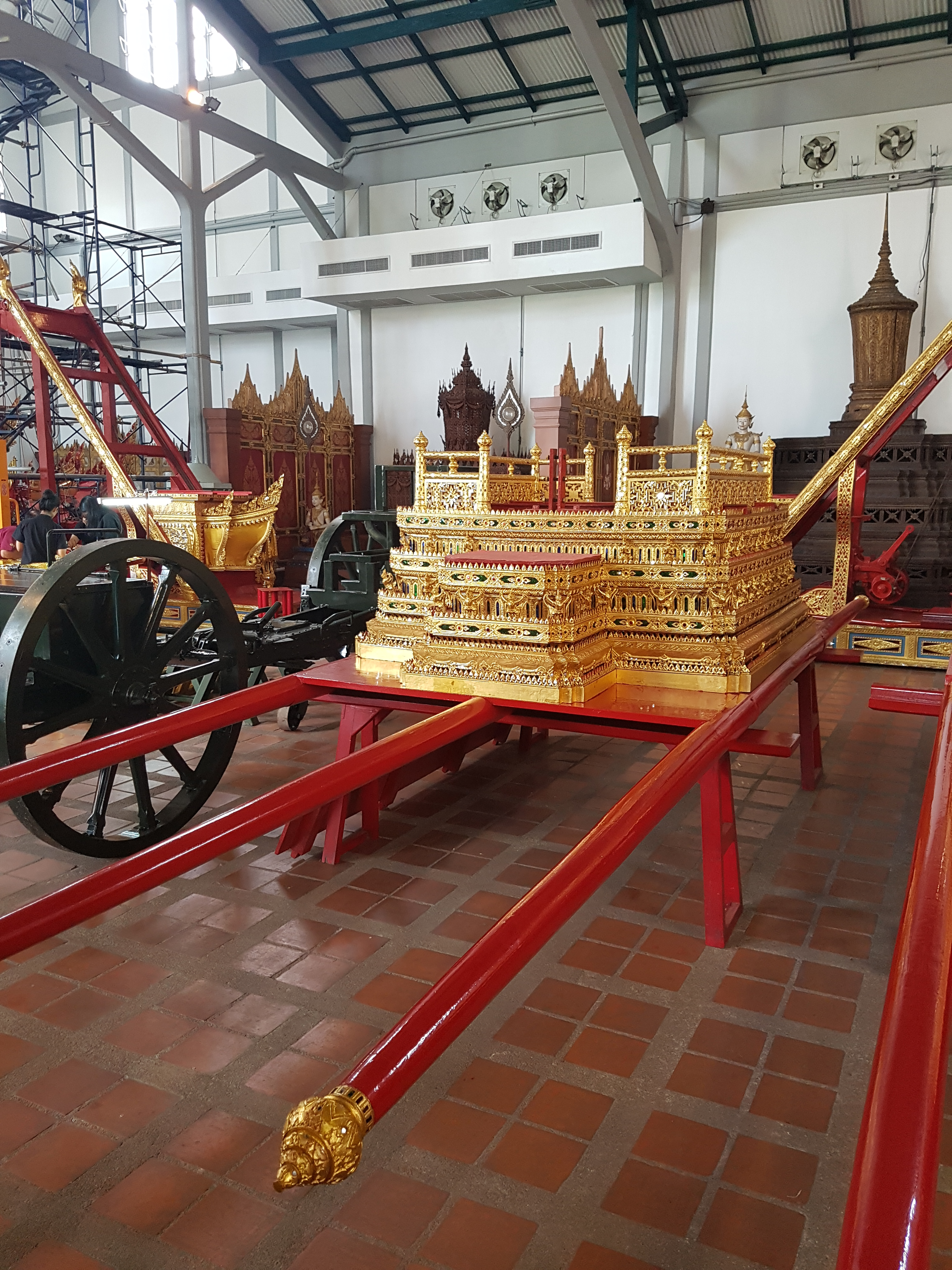
Phra Yannamat Sam Lam Khan (พระยานมาศสามลำคาน), a three-poled palanquin

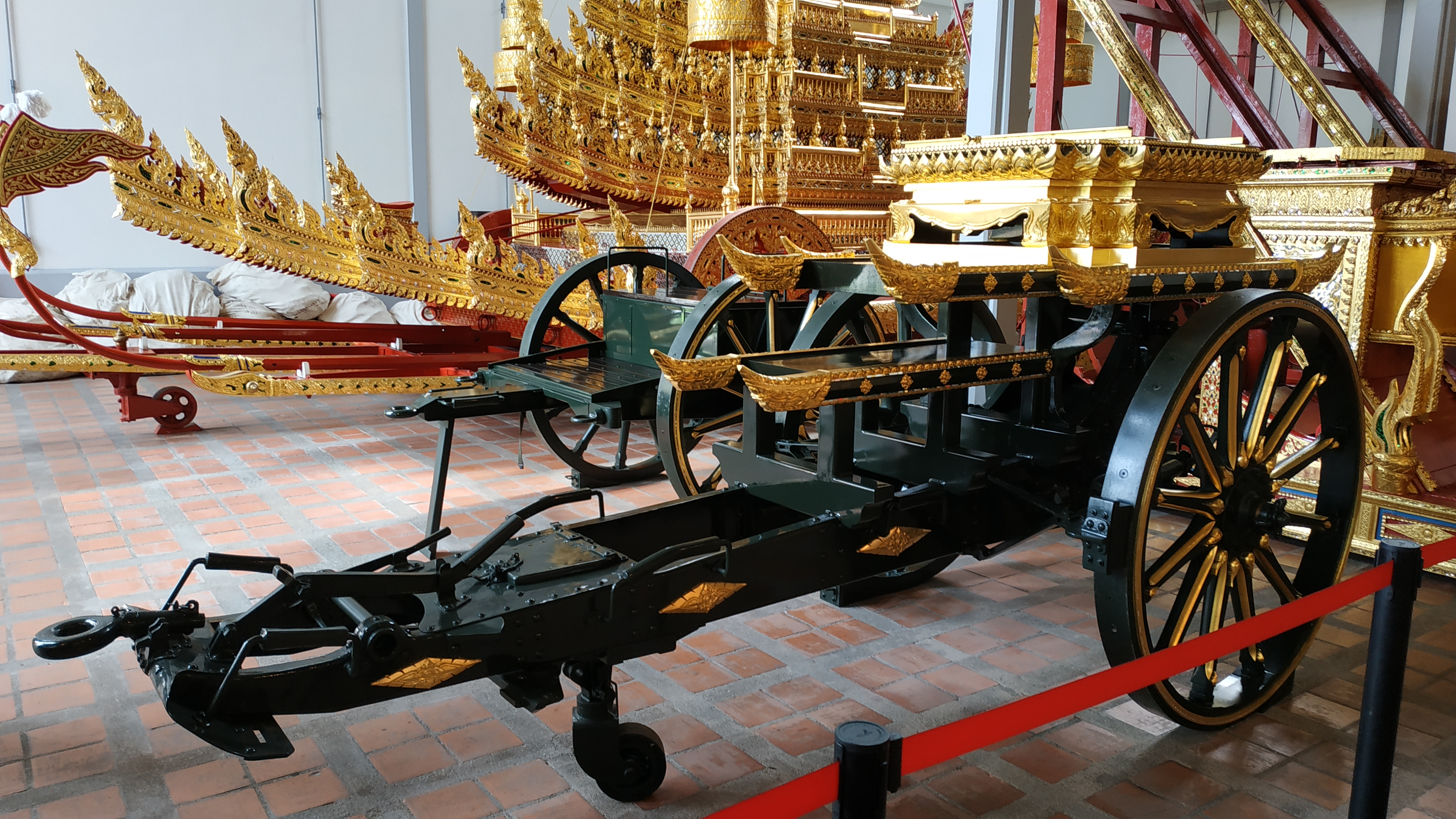
The royal gun carriage for the funeral of King Bhumibol Adulyadej

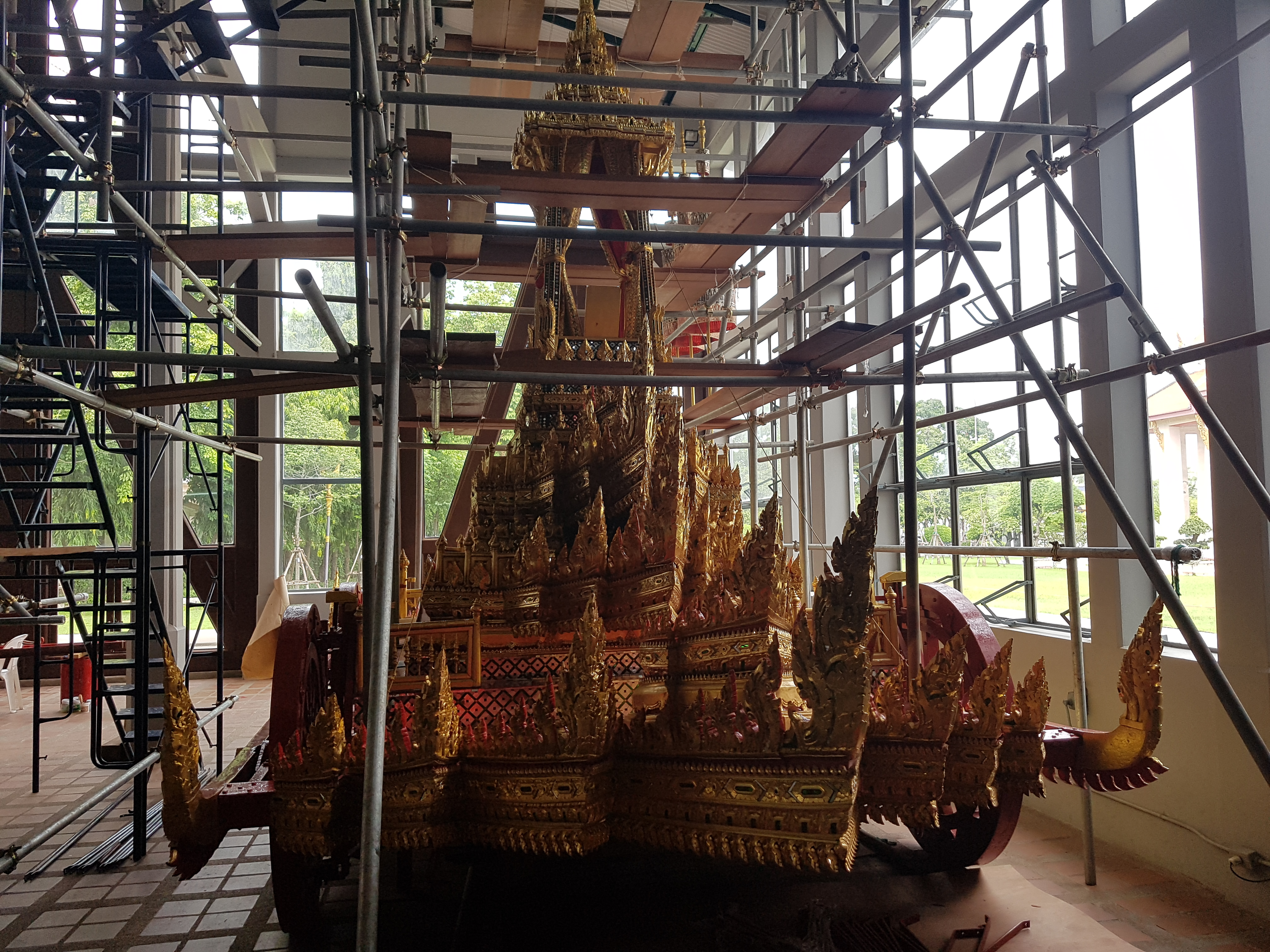
Ratcharot not (ราชรถน้อย), a minor chariot
