= Ministry of the Royal Household =

Ministry of the Royal Household may refer to:

- Ministry of the Royal Household, a former government ministry of Thailand, now the Bureau of the Royal Household
- Ministry of the Imperial Household, a historical government ministry of Japan
