= Royal warrant of appointment (Thailand) =

A Thai royal warrant holder is permitted to mount a Garuda sculpture, modeled from this image, at their office buildings

Royal warrants of appointment (Thai: ตราตั้ง) in Thailand have been issued for decades initially to those who supplied goods or services to the King of Thailand, but have evolved to include companies and businesses that have shown exceptional services and commitment to the economic and social development of the nation. The warrant enables the company to advertise the royal approval of distinction with the display of the royal Garuda (Phra Khrut), thus lending prestige to the company.

The royal warrant of appointment is typically advertised on company hoardings, letter-heads and products by displaying the Garuda as appropriate. Underneath the emblem will usually appear the phrase "By Appointment to His Majesty the King" (โดยได้รับพระบรมราชานุญาต). Often, a large statue of the red garuda emblem will be displayed at the headquarters of the company on the roof, in front of it, or in other rooms. The bestowing of the royal Garuda emblem to a company is considered one of the highest honours for a business in Thailand.

== Royal warrant holders ==
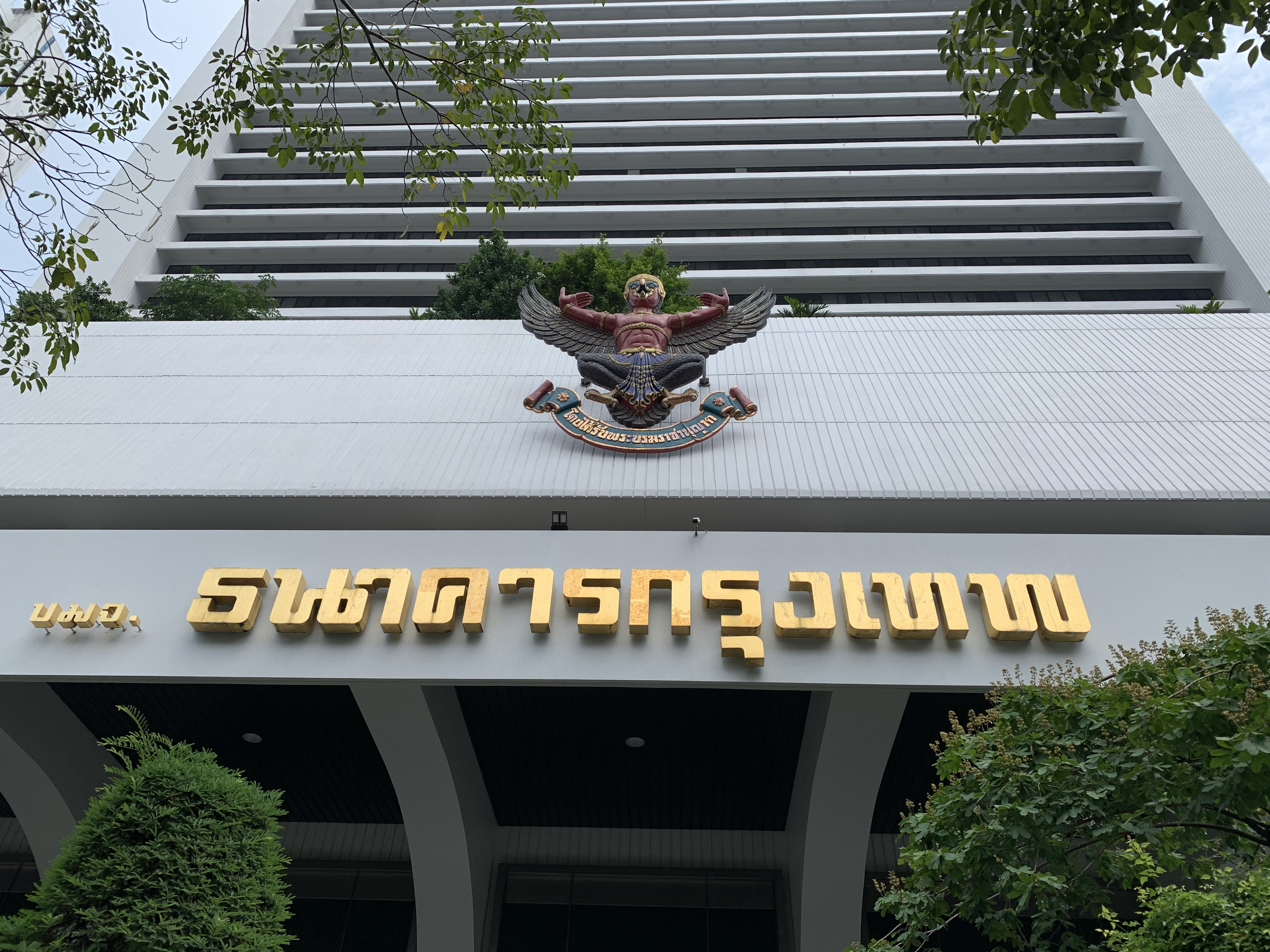
Garuda statue granted by royal appointment at the head office of Bangkok Bank in Bangkok

Warrants are granted in the name of the king. Dozens of Thai companies hold such warrants.

Warrants are awarded at the discretion of the Lord Chamberlain of the Royal Household. The company must have shown "[...] transparency, virtue and trustworthiness, and one that has shown loyalty to the royal household and His Majesty [...]."

Companies are permitted to use the royal Garuda emblem as symbol of their status. A sculpture may be hoisted, which is anointed and blessed by high monks in a Buddhist rite.

The exact number of royal warrant holders is not made public and some companies chose not to divulge that information. Holders tend to be Thai companies, such as Bangkok Airways, Bangkok Bank, Bangkok Hospital, Bangkok Insurance, Berli Jucker, Boon Rawd Brewery, Central Department Store, Charoen Pokphand, Chue Chin Hua, Deves Insurance, International Engineering Public Company Limited, King Power, Muang Thai Life Assurance, Osotspa, Shin Corporation, Siam Commercial Bank, Thai Nakon and TMB Bank.

A non-Thai old warrant holder is Cartier SA, which has received it back in the early 1900s. Other foreign companies that have received royal appointments are DKSH, Shell Thailand on 17 August 1990, Esso Thailand in 1998 and Singer Corporation Thailand on 24 May 2004.
