= Chirayu Isarangkun Na Ayuthaya =

Thai economist and court official

Chirayu Isarangkun Na Ayuthaya MPCh MWM TCW
- จิรายุ อิศรางกูร ณ อยุธยา

Lord Chamberlain of the Royal Household
- In office 23 September 2016 – 12 March 2018
- Monarchs: Bhumibol Adulyadej; Vajiralongkorn
- Preceded by: Keokhwan Vajarodaya
- Succeeded by: Satitpong Sukvimol

Director-General of the Crown Property Bureau
- In office 28 July 1987 – 12 March 2018
- Monarchs: Bhumibol Adulyadej; Vajiralongkorn
- Preceded by: Phunphoem Krairoek
- Succeeded by: Satitpong Sukvimol

Minister to the Office of the Prime Minister
- In office 11 August 1986 – 5 August 1987
- Prime Minister: Prem Tinsulanonda

Minister of Industry
- In office 28 July 1985 – 5 August 1986
- Prime Minister: Prem Tinsulanonda
- Preceded by: Aob Vasurat
- Succeeded by: Pramual Sabhavasu

Personal details
- Born: 12 November 1942 (age 83) Bangkok, Thailand
- Education: London School of Economics; Australian National University
- Occupation: Politician; economist; court official

Chirayu Isarangkun Na Ayuthaya (จิรายุ อิศรางกูร ณ อยุธยา, RTGS: Chirayu Itsarangkun Na Ayutthaya, Thai pronunciation: [t͡ɕìʔraːjúʔ ʔìtsàʔraːŋkuːn náʔ ʔàʔjúttʰáʔjaː]; born 12 November 1942) is a Thai economist and court official. He has been the Director-General of the Crown Property Bureau and Grand Chamberlain of the Bureau of the Royal Household since 1987 and become Lord Chamberlain of the Royal Household in the end of 2016. Chirayu is an avowed proponent of the "sufficiency economy" philosophy that is promoted by King Bhumibol Adulyadej.

== Background and education ==
Chirayu was born in Bangkok. The Isarangkun family is a distant side branch of the ruling Chakri Dynasty. The particle na Ayutthaya indicates this distant royal ancestry. Chirayu's father Charunphan Isarangkun Na Ayuthaya was a diplomat, foreign minister, and member of King Bhumibol's Privy Council. Chirayu visited Bangkok's prestigious all-boys Saint Gabriel's College, before moving to the King's College School in Wimbledon, London, where he acquired his A-levels in 1960. Subsequently, he studied economics at the London School of Economics, receiving an Honours degree in 1964. He took a doctoral degree from the Australian National University in 1971.

== Career ==
From 1976 to 1979, Chirayu was the dean of the faculty of economics of the government-run National Institute of Development Administration (NIDA). Chirayu became Minister of Industry under Prime Minister Prem Tinsulanonda in 1985, and Minister to the Office of Prime Minister one year later. After he had taken a stand for a controversial tantalum factory in Phuket Province that was burnt down by furious locals who were afraid of hazardous wastes, Chirayu was confronted with allegations of corruption, that could however not been proven.

Later, King Bhumibol appointed him Director-General of the Crown Property Bureau (CPB), that is responsible for administering the immense royal assets. Moreover, the king appointed him as Grand Chamberlain of the Bureau of the Royal Household. He is member of the boards of directors of several companies in which the CPB is a principal shareholder. Since 1987 he has been President of the Board of Directors of Deves Insurance. During and after the Asian financial crisis, he was the President of the Board of Directors of Siam Cement — which is one of the biggest corporations of Thailand — from 1998 to 1999, and of Siam Commercial Bank — the country's second largest bank — from 1998 to 2007. Since 2007 he has again led the Board of Directors of Siam Cement.

Moreover, he has been Chancellor of the Council of NIDA since 1998. He manages several foundations under the auspices of the royal family, including the Sai Jai Thai Foundation (for wounded and disabled veterans), the Royal Project Foundation, and the Queen's Foundation of the Promotion of Supplementary Occupations (for farmers).

== Honours ==
=== National honours ===
- Knight Grand Cross (First Class) of the Most Illustrious Order of Chula Chom Klao (2017)
- Knight Grand Cordon (Special Class) of the Most Exalted Order of the White Elephant (1984)
- Knight Grand Cordon (Special Class) of the Most Noble Order of the Crown of Thailand (1983)
- Chakrabarti Mala Medal (2012)
- King Rama IX Royal Cypher Medal, 3rd Class (1991)
- King Rama X Royal Cypher Medal, 3rd Class (2019)

=== Foreign honours ===
- Brunei:
  - Second Class of the Order of Paduka Seri Laila Jasa (2002)
- Denmark:
  - Grand Cross of the Order of the Dannebrog (2001)
- Japan:
  - Gold and Silver Star (2nd Class) of the Order of the Rising Sun (1991)
- Sweden:
  - Commander Grand Cross of the Order of the Polar Star (2003)
- Netherlands:
  - Knight Grand Cross of the Order of Orange-Nassau (2004)
- United Kingdom:
  - Knight Commander of the Royal Victorian Order (1996)

Court offices
Preceded by Keokhwan Vajarodaya	Lord Chamberlain; 2016–2018	Succeeded by Satitpong Sukvimol
