= Deves Insurance =

Thai insurance company

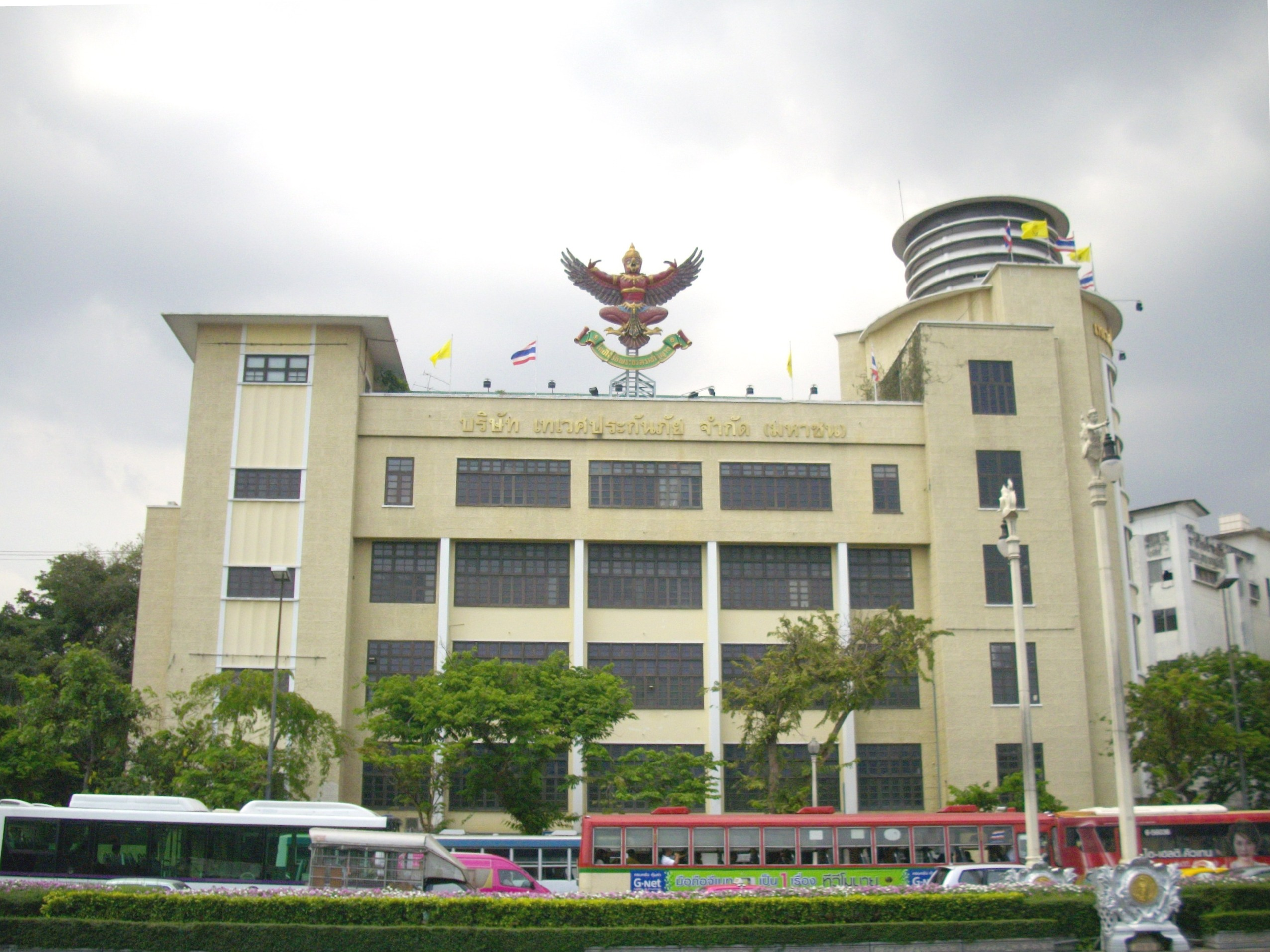
- Deves Insurance Building at Ratchadamnoen Avenue, Bangkok
- Industry: Insurance
- Founded: 1947
- Headquarters: Bangkok, Thailand
- Key people: Chirayu Isarangkun Na Ayuthaya, President
- Revenue: ▲TH฿ 4.17 billion (2014)
- Net income: ▲TH฿ 259.48 million (2014)
- Total assets: ▼TH฿ 15.63 billion (2014)
- Parent: Crown Property Bureau
- Website: www.deves.co.th/Home

The Deves Insurance Public Company Limited is a Thai insurance company based in Bangkok at Ratchadamnoen Klang Road.

The company is one of the leading insurance companies in the country. It received the royal warrant from the King of Thailand. The garuda statue at the top of headquarters symbolizes that privilege. It is owned by the Crown Property Bureau.
