= Chue Chin Hua =

Thai aluminium cookware and metal production company

Chue Chin Hua Company Ltd.
- Industry: Cookware
- Founded: 1936
- Founder: Udom Pichitpongchai
- Headquarters: Thailand
- Website: https://cch.co.th/

The Chue Chin Hua Company Ltd. is one of the leading aluminium cookware and metal producing companies in Thailand. The headquarters are in Samut Prakan.

== History ==
The company was founded by Udom Pichitpongchai in 1936 to produce aluminium cookware. For its services and leading position it was awarded the royal warrant with the honourable emblem "By Appointment of His Majesty The King" in 1973.

Chue Chin Hua has multiple sub-companies that produce different things such as cookware and utensils, but has expanded to include the production of outdoor lighting poles, luminaires, highway guardrails, steel bars, wire rods, aluminium sheets, coils and discs, window and door screens and louver windows.

Another company that belongs to the group is the Aluminium Chue Chin Hua company. Its cookware brand is "Crocodile", which it has been manufacturing since 1943, making it one of the leading Thai cookware products.

Its factories are located in Bangkok, Samut Prakan, and Chonburi Province.

The company has been highly involved in the infrastructure building of Thailand. Its products are present on almost 80 percent of all streets, bridges, roadways, and in kitchens in Thailand.
