= Andriy Beshta =

Ukrainian politician and diplomat (1976–2021)

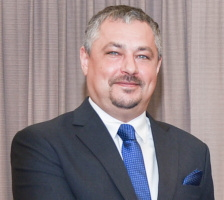

Ukrainian ambassador to Thailand
- In office November 2015 – 30 May 2021

Personal details
- Born: Andriy Petrovych Beshta; 14 December 1976 Rozhyshche, Ukrainian SSR, Soviet Union
- Died: 30 May 2021 (aged 44) Ko Lipe, Satun Province, Thailand

Andriy Petrovych Beshta (Ukrainian: Андрій Петрович Бешта; 14 December 1976 – 30 May 2021) was a Ukrainian politician and diplomat. In November 2015, he became the Ukrainian Ambassador to Thailand, and in 2017, took up part-time positions as Ambassador to Laos and Myanmar. He held all three positions until his death in 2021, although in April he was dismissed from the position of Ambassador to Thailand along with several other ambassadors but held onto the post because a successor had not yet presented their credentials.

On August 24, 2021, he was posthumously awarded the diplomatic rank of Ambassador Extraordinary and Plenipotentiary.

== Biography ==
He was born on December 14, 1976, in Rozhyshche, Volyn. Graduated with honors from University of Lviv named after Franka, specialist in international relations, translator, with a special direction of "Oriental languages and literature" (Thai). Fluent in English.

He was in the Ministry of Foreign Affairs (Ukraine) since 1998. He worked abroad at the Permanent Mission of Ukraine to the United Nations, as well as at the Embassy of Ukraine in the Kingdom of Thailand. Specialist in the activities of the UN and other international organizations. In 2007 he first arrived in Thailand as a counsellor to the diplomatic mission in Bangkok, and was promoted in 2011 to the embassy's deputy director-general.

He was deputy director of the Department of International Organizations of the Ministry of Foreign Affairs of Ukraine. He was also Member of the Ukrainian delegation to participate in the work of the 67th session of the United Nations General Assembly.

== Personal life and death ==
Beshta married Natalya and had a daughter, Oksana, and two sons, Andrey and Ostap.

On 28 May 2021 he visited Ko Lipe, a resort island in Thailand's Satun Province, to say goodbye to the Chairman of the Satun Tourism Association as he was set to return to Ukraine following his dismissal. However, he died two days later on 30 May from a heart attack. He was 44.
