= Prakhom band =

Traditional Thai music band

A prakhom band (Thai: วงเครื่องประโคม) is a type of traditional Thai music band employed to play ceremonial music–known as prakhom music–during certain Thai rituals. Today, they report to the Bureau of the Royal Household's (BRH) Royal Ceremonial Division, and are responsible for the playing of traditional songs during royal events of the Royal Family of Thailand, in a custom known as prakhom yam yam or royal ceremonial music performances. The Prakhom Band plays the prakhom part of state events involving the Thai Royal Family and are distinguished by their red dress uniforms and pith helmets. As the term states they play ceremonial music every three hours during state funeral rites to signal officials and staff members of the Royal Family and the ensemble plays in other events like state coronations, royal anniversaries and the State Opening of the National Assembly.

The ensemble is similar to the daechwita ensembles of South Korea, but are of Chinese and Hindu origin. Unlike other ensembles it reports as part of the Royal Ceremonial Division of the BRH, since the instruments are part of the Thai royal regalia. Of the 80 members, 38 work for the BRH, 42 are uniformed personnel of the Royal Thai Army 11th Military District (1st Division, King's Guard).

In parades and ceremonies these are reinforced by cadets of the Armed Forces Academies Preparatory School and traditional musicians from the Royal Thai Navy.

== Instruments of the ensemble ==
If performing during state ceremonies:

- 1 Royal Khong meng (the Victory Gong)
- 1 Poeng mang
- 2 Glong banthoh (gold small barrel drums, only for the King)
- 16 Klong khaek
- 2 Pi chanai
- 8–12 Trae horns (small horns)
- 2–4 Sangkhlas (conch shell horns)
- 10–14 fanfare trumpets

If on parade or during funeral marches:

- 1 clapper (separate from the band)
- 2 standard bearers
- 2 Pi chanai
- 1–2 poeng mang
- 4 glong banthoh (only if the King is present) composed of 4 timpanists and a squad of 4 bearers on each drum
- 160 1st Klong khaek
- 40 2nd klong khaek (20 silver and 20 gold each)
- 28 Trae horns
- 4 Sangkla conch horns
- 20 fanfare trumpets
- 4 drum majors
- 2 fanfare conductors

== See also ==
- Monarchy of Thailand
- Bureau of the Royal Household
- Traditional Thai musical instruments
