= Anne Namakau Mutelo =

Namibian diplomat

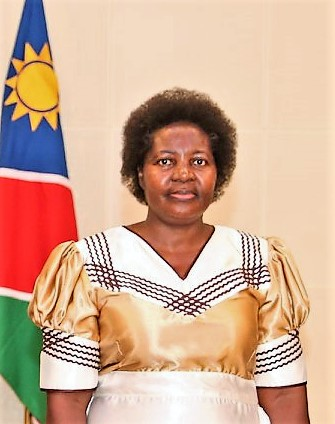

Anne Namakau Mutelo is a Namibian diplomat from the Zambezi Region.

== Education ==
Mutelo completed her primary and secondary education in Zamibia, and in 1977 she completed her high school education at Kalonga Secondary School in Kabwe.

Mutelo graduated from the University of Fort Hare in South Africa with a bachelor's degree in social Work. She also has a certificate in multilateral diplomacy from the Graduate Institute of International Studies. She also obtained a post graduate diploma in contemporary diplomacy from the University of Malta and Diplofoundation.

== Diplomatic career ==
Mutelo was an AU and UNECA chairperson as well as the ambassador of the Republic of Namibia to Ethiopia in 2015. In 1991–1995, Mutelo was the desk officer for the Southern African Development Community (SADC). During that period, she attended several SADC summits as well as SADC-EU conferences, from 1995 to 1999. She was in Botswana as Deputy Ambassador at the Namibia High Commission.
