= Maha Kanachan Yen Tek =

Thai Chinese Buddhist monk (1936–2023)

Maha Kanachan Yen Tek พระมหาคณาจารย์จีนธรรมสมาธิวัตร 仁得上師

Personal life
- Born: Veera Bodhichanprasert วีระ โพธิชาญประเสริฐ; 25 March 1936 Kanchanaburi Province, Thailand
- Died: 30 March 2023 (aged 87) Wat Pho Yen Temple, Tha Maka District, Kanchanaburi, Thailand

Religious life
- Religion: Buddhism
- Order: Mūlasarvāstivāda vinaya
- School: Mahayana
- Lineage: Thai Chinese Buddhist tradition
- Monastic name: 仁得 (Réndé)
- Ordination: 7 May 1957 (aged 21)

Senior posting
- Teacher: Ajahn Bodh-Chaeng (普淨上師)
- Post: Chief Abbot of the Chinese Sangha Sect of Thailand; Abbot of Wat Phothiwihan Khunaram
- Website: wmw.ac.th

Phra Maha Kanachan Chin Thammasamadhiwat (Yen Tek) (Thai: พระมหาคณาจารย์จีนธรรมสมาธิวัตร (เย็นเต็ก); Chinese: 仁得）(25 March 1936 – 30 March 2023) was a Thai Buddhist monk of the minority Thai Chinese Mahayana tradition. he served as the seventh supreme patriarch of the Chinese Sangha of Thailand, and was the abbot of Wat Phothiwihan Khunaram (Wat Phothi Man Khunaram). He was also the founding patriarch of Wat Meun Phuttha Metta Khunaram and Wat Phutthakhun temples.

Yen Tek was born with the lay name Veera Bodhichanprasert in Kanchanaburi Province in 1936. He was the son of Thai Chinese Teochew parents, surnamed Chen (แซ่ตั้ง), whose ancestral roots are from Jieyang, Guangdong.

On 7 May 1950, he was ordained as a monk at Wat Pho Yen, in Tha Maka District, Kanchanaburi Province. His preceptor was Phra Maha Kanachan Chin Thamma Samathiwat (Bodhi-Jaeng). Upon ordination, he received the Chinese Dharma name Yen Tek. After his ordination, he studied and practiced the Dharma under his teacher and assisted in the construction of Wat Phothi Man Khunaram until its completion. When his preceptor died in 1986, he succeeded him as abbot. He formally received a royal appointment from King Bhumibol Adulyadej in 1988 as the Supreme Patriarch of the Chinese Sangha of Thailand. He was granted several ecclesiastical ranks following his appointment as supreme patriarch. In the same year, he made a pilgrimage to the Ladakh Plateau in India, where he received tantric teachings from a tulku. There, he was confirmed as a Vajra Ācārya and returned to Thailand to promote harmony between the Mahāyāna and Vajrayāna teachings.

Yen Tek died at Siriraj Piyamaharajkarun Hospital in Bangkok on 30 March 2023, at 10:50 AM. He was 87 years old and had served as a monk for 66 years.

== Administrative Positions ==
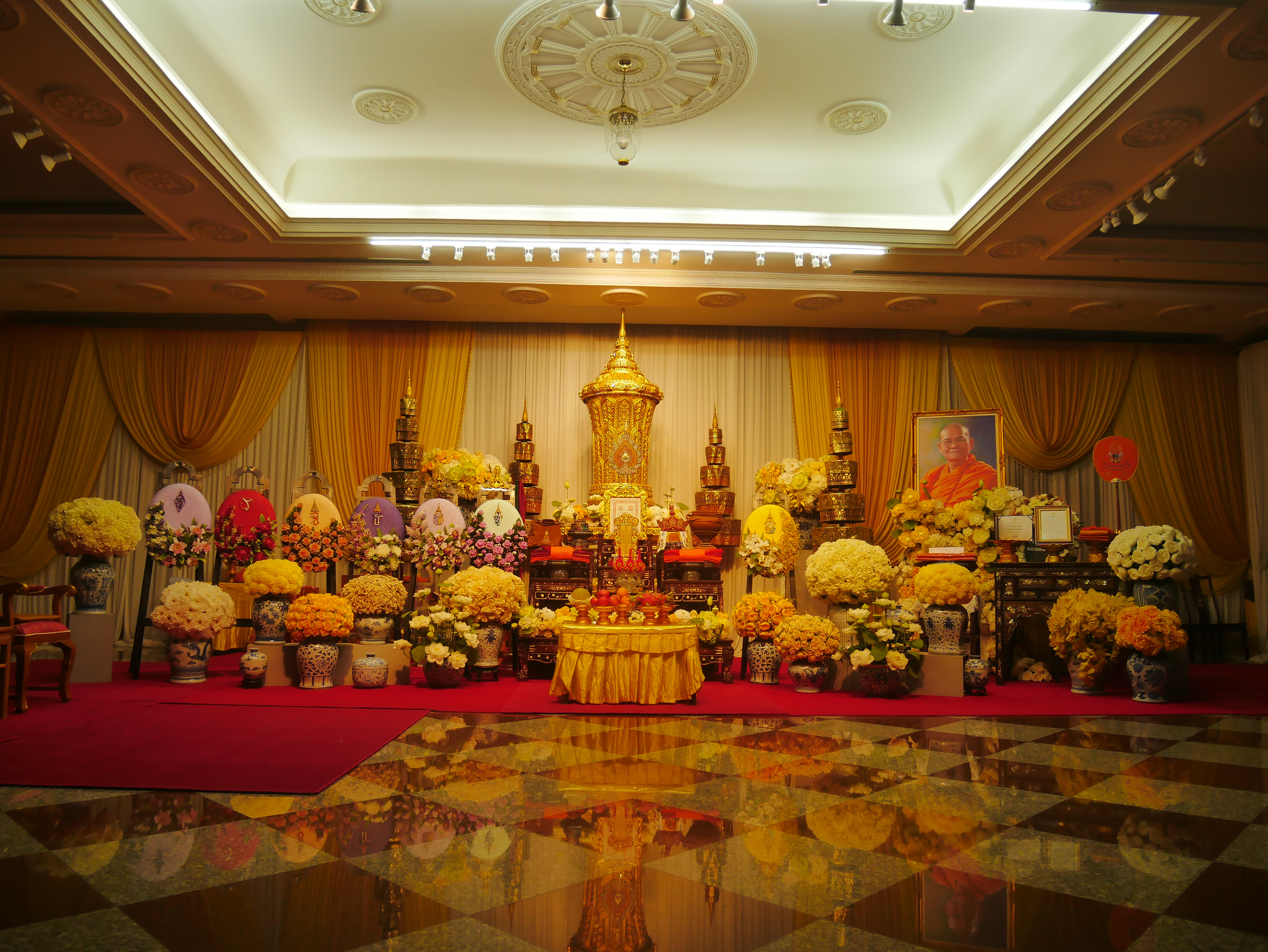
His Majesty King Maha Vajiralongkorn Bodindradebayavarangkun graciously bestowed Granted coffin jar in honor of the body of Venerable Mahajanachon Chin Dharma Samadhiwat (Yentek) to be enshrined at Wat Pho Man Khunaram, Bangkok

- 1968, Deputy Abbot of Wat Pho Man Khunaram
- 1969, Preceptor
- 1970, Assistant Secretary of the Chinese Sect
- 1973, Member of the Chinese Sect Committee
- 1978, Vice Chairman of the Chinese Sect Committee and Secretary to the Grand Abbot of the Chinese Sect
- 1982, Deputy Grand Abbot of the Chinese Sect
- 1986, Acting on behalf of the Grand Abbot of the Chinese Sect
- 1986, Acting on behalf of the Grand Abbot of the Chinese Sect
- 1987, Acting on behalf of the Grand Abbot of the Chinese Sect
- 1985 1987, Chairman of the Chinese Sangha Committee
- 1987, Abbot of Wat Pho Man Khunaram
- 1997, Acting Abbot of Wat Muen Phuttha Metta Khunaram

== Ecclesiastical titles ==
- In 1968, he was appointed as Luang Chin Winai Thon (Yentek) Number of titles in Phrakhanachan Chin Thammasamadhiwat (Pho Chaeng)
- In 1970, he was granted a royal warrant to appoint him as Luang Chin Thammarak Chin Prachit, assistant to the left secretary.
- In 1982, he was granted a royal warrant to appoint him as Phra Ajahn Chin Thammakhanathikan Paisarn Samanakit Can appoint 3 monks (equal to the third-class royal monks)
- In 1987, received a royal certificate of appointment of the ecclesiastical title as 'Phra Khanajan Chin Thammasamadhiwat, Phutthaphachon Chin Neta Can appoint 5 monks (equal to the Phra Rajakhana rank of Thep)
- In 1992, received a royal certificate of appointment to the ecclesiastical title of Phra Khanajan Chin Thammasamatiwat, Buddhist group of China Vineta, Sadhuchan Thammaprasit, Boromanarisaranuwat, appointed 5 members of the bibliography. (equal to the special class of the royal monks)
- In 1996, received a royal certificate of appointment to the title of Phra Khanajan Chin Thammasamatiwat, Buddhist group of China Pinet Witesatham Prasit Boromanarinnuwat, appointed 6 persons as a nominator. (equal to Phra Rajakhana rank of Dharma)
- 1999 - Received a royal certificate to promote the ecclesiastical rank to Phra Mahakhana Chin Tham Samadhiwat Chinese Buddhist Association Phinet Witesatham Prasat Navakitpilas Prayuk Tanukchin Prachawisit with a number of 6 persons who can appoint a number of novices. (equal to Phra Rajakhana rank of Dharma Special)
