= Royal funeral chariot =

Southeast Asia transport vehicle

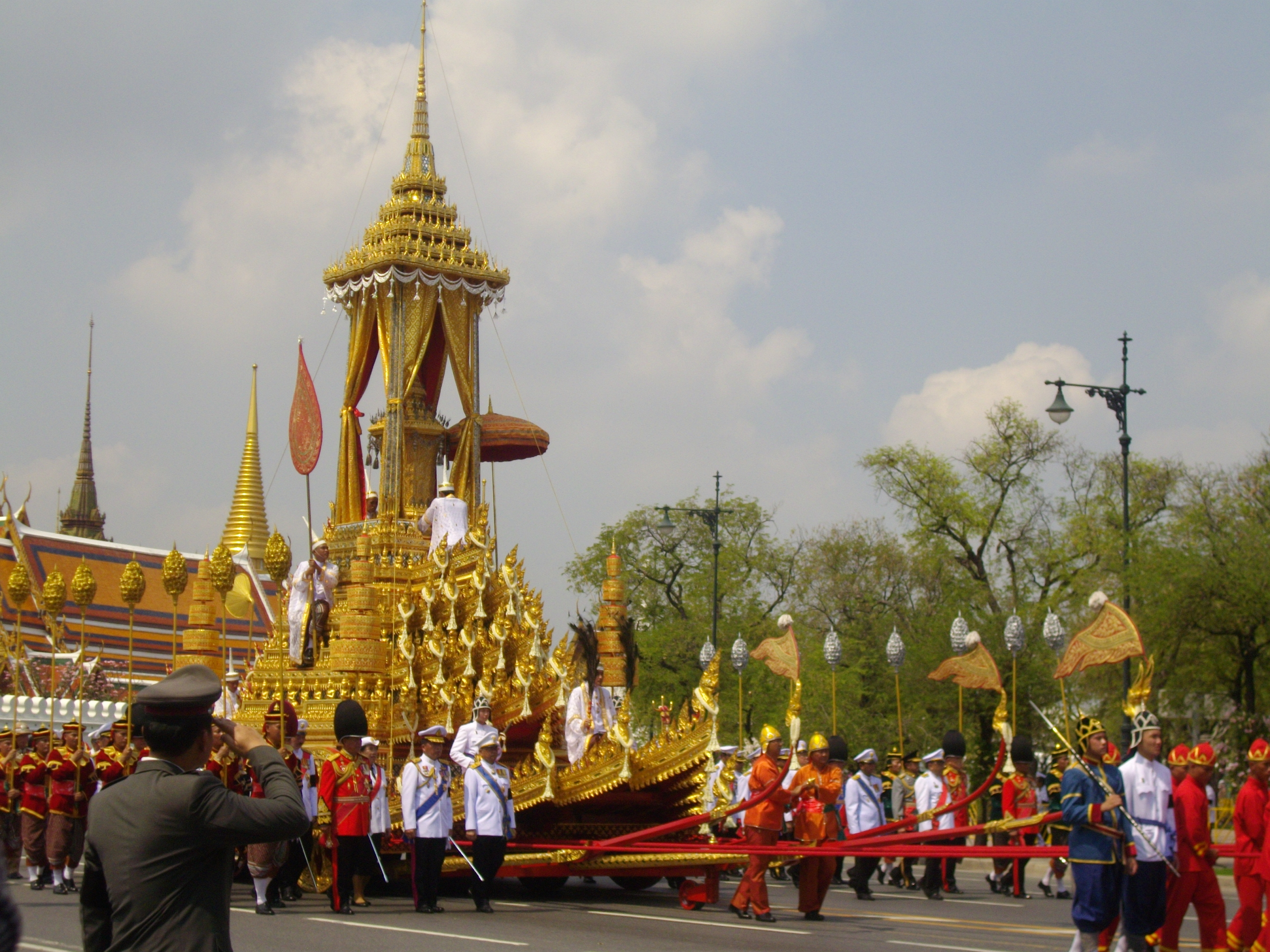
Thailand's Maha Phichai Ratcharot during the royal cremation procession of Princess Bejaratana in 2012

A royal funeral chariot is a wheeled vehicle traditionally used to transport the bodies of royalty during funeral processions in some cultures of Mainland Southeast Asia. Today, they remain in use in Thailand and Cambodia.

== Thailand ==
The royal funeral chariots of Thailand were used since the Ayutthaya period, but they were destroyed when Ayutthaya was completely sacked in 1767. New funeral chariots were commissioned during the reign of King Rama I, at the beginning of the Rattanakosin period. They include, among other smaller accompanying vehicles, the two main chariots which have been used to transport the bodies of kings of the Chakri dynasty, the Maha Phichai Ratcharot ("Royal Great Victory Carriage" or "Royal Chariot of Great Victory"), built in 1795, and Vejayanta Ratcharot (Named after Indra's chariot Vejayanta), built in 1799. The chariots, built of teak and ornately carved, gilded and decorated, have a tall, tiered design symbolizing Mount Meru surrounded by devata (angels) and nāga. The chariots are topped with a butsabok (open-sided roofed structure) which houses the royal funerary urn containing the royal body. Despite the term used, the "chariots" have four wheels and are pulled by hundreds of men.

The Maha Phichai Ratcharot was used for the funeral procession of King Bhumibol Adulyadej in October 2017. It was drawn by 216 men. The 13.7 tonne chariot is 18 metres long, 11.2 metres high, and 4.8 metres wide. It has been used 25 times, most recently in 2012 for the cremation of Princess Bejaratana Rajasuda, the late king's cousin.

The royal chariots are housed in the Bangkok National Museum and undergo restoration when they are needed for royal funerals. Following custom, The doorsill of the exhibition hall and a section of the museum wall are demolished and a path is laid each time the chariots need to be brought outside. Then the structures are rebuilt and the path removed after the ceremony ends, signifying that their future use is not anticipated.

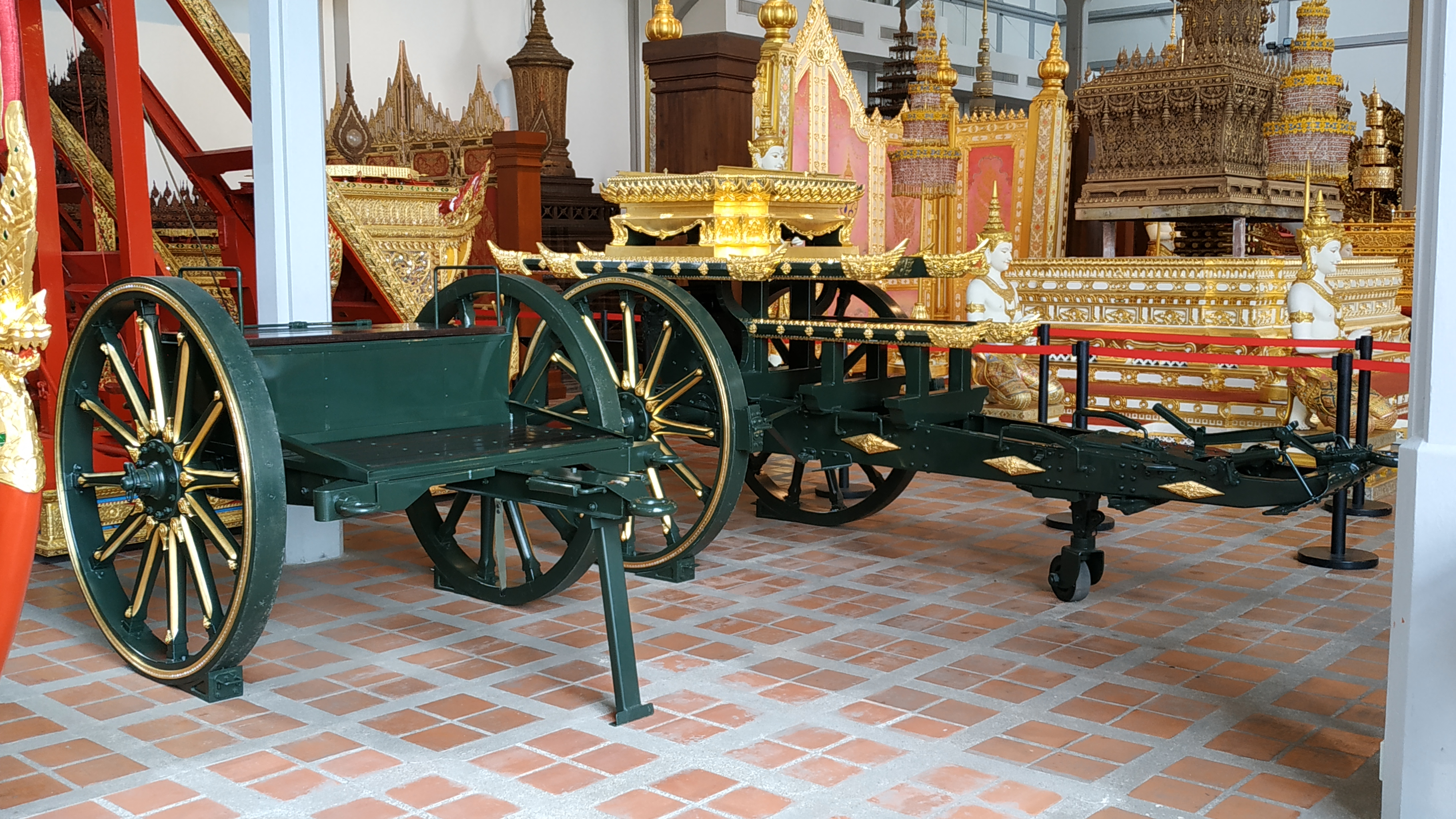
Royal gun carriage used in the cremation ceremony of King Bhumibol Adulyadej, Bangkok National Museum.

An additional chariot, the Rajarot Puen Yai (royal gun carriage), is used only for the cremations of the King in his constitutional duty as Head of the Royal Thai Armed Forces (a tradition started by King Vajiravudh on his request to recognize the royal patronage and support for the armed services of the Kingdom, used for the first time in his state cremation in 1926) as the urn carrying his remains is carried in procession around the royal crematorium at the Sanam Luang Royal Plaza thrice before the cremation services begin. The carriage is modeled on those used in the royal and state funerals in the United Kingdom, and was restored yet again in 2017.

== See also ==
- Thai royal funeral
- Limbers and caissons
