= Bureau of the Royal Household =

Thai ministry for royal property management

- สำนักพระราชวัง

Agency overview
- Formed: 5 May 1935
- Preceding agencies: Krommawang (14th Century–1892); Krom Dharmadhikorn (formerly Krommawang; renamed in Sanskrit under King Borommatrailokkanat) (1436–1892); Ministry of the Royal Household (1892–1932) and (1933–1935); Royal Household Headquarters (1932–1933)
- Jurisdiction: Thailand
- Headquarters: Dusit, Bangkok, Thailand
- Annual budget: 6,800 million baht (FY2019)
- Agency executives: Air Chief Marshal Satitpong Sukvimol, Lord Chamberlain; Police Colonel Thamanithi Wanichthanom, Grand Chamberlain; Lieutenant Colonel Somchai Kanchanamani, Grand Chamberlain; Air Chief Marshal Thira Chiangthong, Grand Chamberlain; Air Vice Marshal Amnat Jiramanimai, Grand Chamberlain; Air Vice Marshal Supichai Sunthonbura, Grand Chamberlain
- Parent agency: Royal Office
- Child agencies: Office of the Commissioner; Royal Household Command; Department of the King's Own Bodyguard 904 (“904” is King Vajiralongkorn’s personal code); Department of Her Majesty's Private Affairs; Royal Household Support Department; Department of His Majesty's Private Secretary; Department of the Royal Family Affairs; Department of Special Services
- Website: Royal Office

The Bureau of the Royal Household (BRH) is a royal agency with a status equivalent to a ministry of the Royal Thai Government, directly under the authority of the monarch. It is responsible for royal affairs concerning the King and the Royal Family, as well as the management and protection of the monarch’s assets and interests. The Lord Chamberlain of the Royal Household oversees its administration.

The 2019 budget for the Bureau of the Royal Household was 6,800 million baht, up from 6,391.4 million baht in FY2018.

== History ==
Seal of Ministry of the Royal Household

The history of the king's household pre-dates modern Thailand, links with the past are preserved. For example, the importance of "institutional memory" led to the appointment in the 1980s of a nonagenarian Khun Sawet Thunapradit as "Special Consultant to the Royal Household". From 2017, The Office of His Majesty's Principal Private Secretary falls under the direct supervision of Bureau of the Royal Household.

The agency's headquarters, headed by the Lord Chamberlain, is at Suan Amphon near Dusit Palace in Bangkok.

== Palaces ==
The bureau is responsible for promoting and maintaining three different royal palaces:

- Grand Palace
- Dusit Palace
- Bang Pa-In Royal Palace

== Public relations ==
Some of the public relations of the monarchy are handled by officials of this bureau. For example, during a period in which the king was quite ill, the bureau's official announcements provided information about the monarch's condition.

The BRH, through its Royal Ceremonial Division, is also responsible for organizing events related to the Royal Family of Thailand.

== Finances ==
In 1932, assets of the royal family and household were seized. Much of it was restored after 1947.

The monarchy's household and finances are managed by the Bureau of the Royal Household and the Crown Property Bureau, respectively. They are quasi-government agencies of the Royal Thai Government with nominal cabinet representation on their respective governing boards but with the majority of personnel, in practice, being appointed by the palace.
