= 11th Infantry Regiment (Thailand) =

11th King Close Bodyguard Regiment, King Close Bodyguard
- กรมทหารมหาดเล็กราชวัลลภที่ 11 รักษาพระองค์ กองบัญชาการทหารมหาดเล็กราชวัลลภรักษาพระองค์ หน่วยบัญชาการถวายความปลอดภัยรักษาพระองค์
- Emblem of the 11th King Close Bodyguard Regiment, King Own Bodyguard
- Active: 1902–present
- Country: Thailand
- Branch: Royal Thai Army
- Type: Royal guard
- Role: Anti-tank warfare Artillery observer Bomb disposal Close-quarters battle Counterinsurgency; Counterintelligence; Conventional warfare Covert operation Crowd control Executive protection Force protection HUMINT; Intelligence assessment Jungle warfare Marching; Patrolling; Raiding; Reconnaissance; Tactical emergency medical services Urban warfare
- Size: Regiment
- Part of: Royal Security Command
- Garrison/HQ: Bang Khen District, Bangkok
- Nicknames: Tahan Lorm Wang (ทหารล้อมวัง, The palace bodyguards)
- Colors: Blue-White
- March: Royal Guards March (มาร์ชราชวัลลภ, March Raja Vanlok)
- Engagements: Boworadet rebellion; World War II; Franco-Thai War; Pacific War; Cold War; Korean War; Vietnam War; Communist insurgency in Thailand; Vietnamese border raids in Thailand; South Thailand insurgency

The 11th King Close Bodyguard Regiment, King Own Bodyguard (Thai: กรมทหารมหาดเล็กราชวัลลภที่ 11 รักษาพระองค์) (กรม.ทม.11 รอ.) is a King's Guard regiment under the Royal Security Command. The regiment is divided into three battalions, all of them based in Bangkok. Formerly having a duty to guard the palace in the reign of King Mongkut to practice military subjects in order to perform effective and set up a Royal Palace Guard Regiment or the army surrounded the palace with the blue uniform is likely to come from the color of Krom Wang (Bureau of the Lord Chamberlain) uniforms. The reign of King Chulalongkorn please King Vajiravudh, when he was the Siamese Crown Prince as a special colonel of the regiment which makes the unit have a bond with King Vajiravudh. When King Vajiravudh later ascended to the throne, he was accepted as a special commander of the Regiment which His Majesty's color is blue.

== History ==
The Royal Guards were established by King Mongkut (Rama IV) of Siam to serve and protect the monarchy by acting as a custody unit and supervise the safety situation neatness in the fence around the royal court, which led to commoners referring to them as the "Tahan Lorm Wang" (The palace bodyguards).

In the past political history of The 11th Infantry Regiment is considered an important role. Especially when any event occurs which led to the undermining of national security, then the 11th Infantry Regiment would take him to join one of the main forces of security as in the past such as Boworadet rebellion, Franco-Thai War, Manhattan Rebellion including Communist insurgency in Thailand. During 2010 Thai political protests 11th Infantry Regiment become a main role for Centre for Resolution of Emergency Situation to control protests of United Front for Democracy Against Dictatorship.

11th Infantry Regiment under the command of Colonel Thanom Kittikachorn was established as a King's Guard unit in His Majesty King Bhumibol Adulyadej on 20 January 1949. The Royal Guards still exist down to the present and serve as protectors of the Royal Family of Thailand. On 18 January 2019, the unit has renamed to 11th King's Own Bodyguard Regiment. Then, on 23 April 2019, the unit has renamed again to 11th Infantry Regiment, King's Close Bodyguard. On October 1, 2019, the unit was transferred to be directly to Royal Security Command under the command of King Maha Vajiralongkorn, along with 1st Infantry Regiment.

The current unit's name is 11th King Close Bodyguard Regiment, King Close Bodyguard.

In 2026, the unit's name has been changed again.

== Organization ==
=== Active ===
- 1st King Close Bodyguard Battalion, 11th King Close Bodyguard Regiment, King Own Bodyguard
- 2nd King Close Bodyguard Battalion, 11th King Close Bodyguard Regiment, King Own Bodyguard
- 3rd King Close Bodyguard Battalion, 11th King Close Bodyguard Regiment, King Own Bodyguard

== Notable members ==
- Crown Prince Maha Vajiravudh (later King Rama VI) Special Colonel of the regiment
- Field Marshal Thanom Kittikachorn, Commander of the regiment, Prime Minister of Thailand (1963-1973,1958), Former Commander-in-Chief of the Royal Thai Army, Former Supreme Commander of the Royal Thai Armed Forces
- General Apirat Kongsompong, Commander of the regiment, Former Commander-in-Chief of the Royal Thai Army (2018-2020)
- General Pornpipat Benyasri, Former Chief of Defence Forces (2018-2020)

== Gallery ==
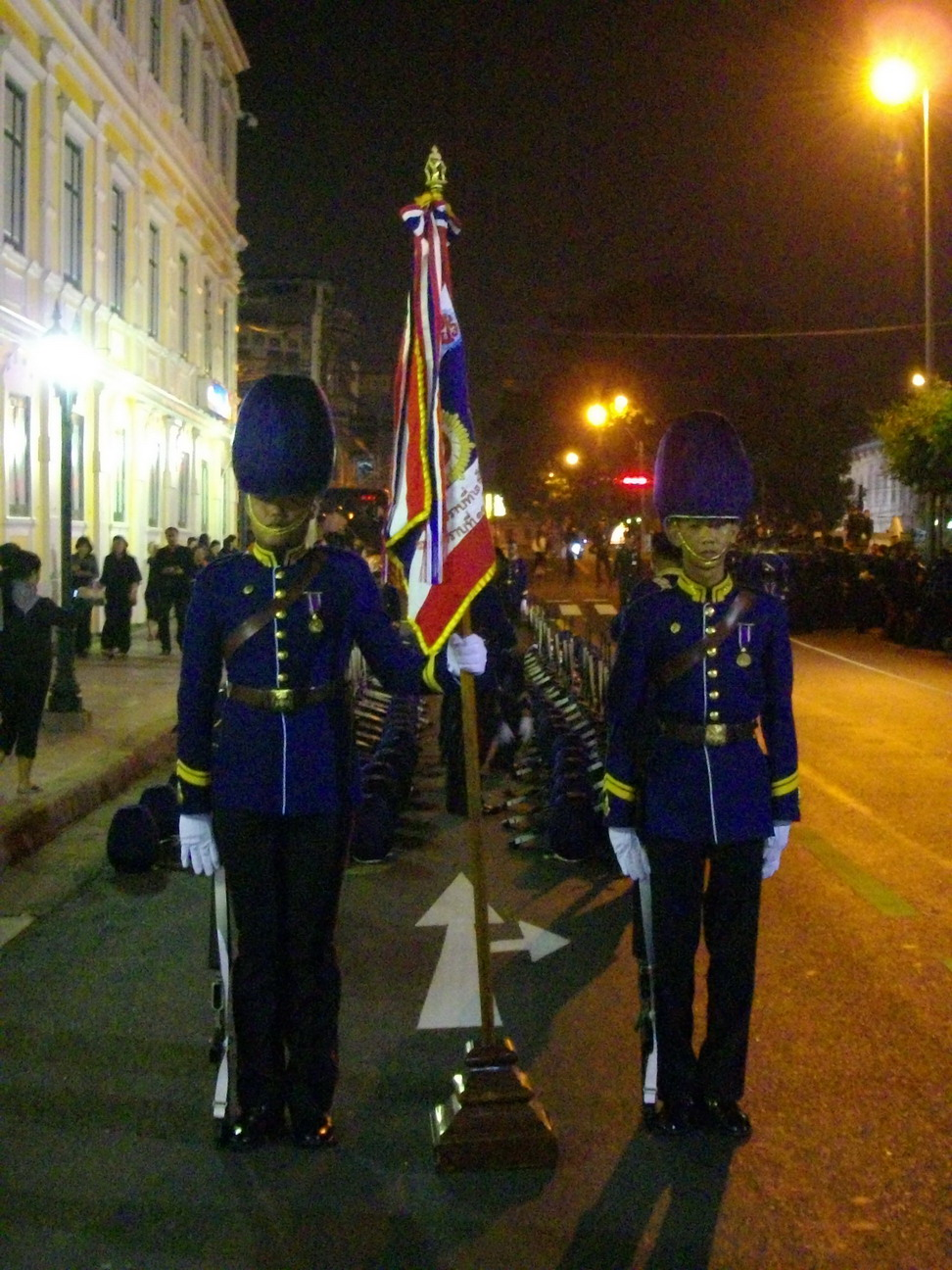
Unit colours of the 2nd Infantry Battalion, 11th Infantry Regiment, King's Guard

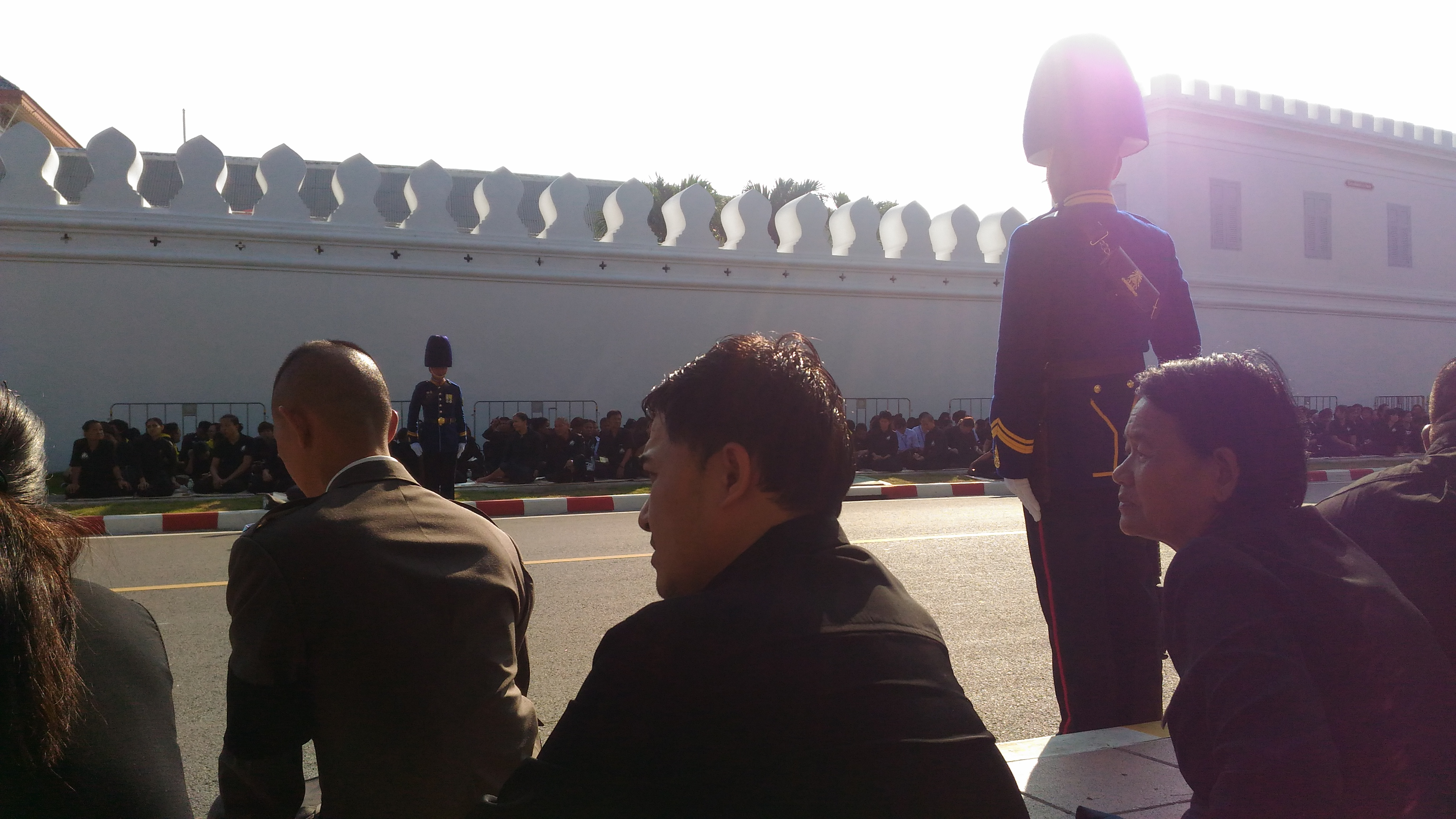
Soldiers from 11th Infantry Regiment on guard during the first funeral procession of King Rama IX

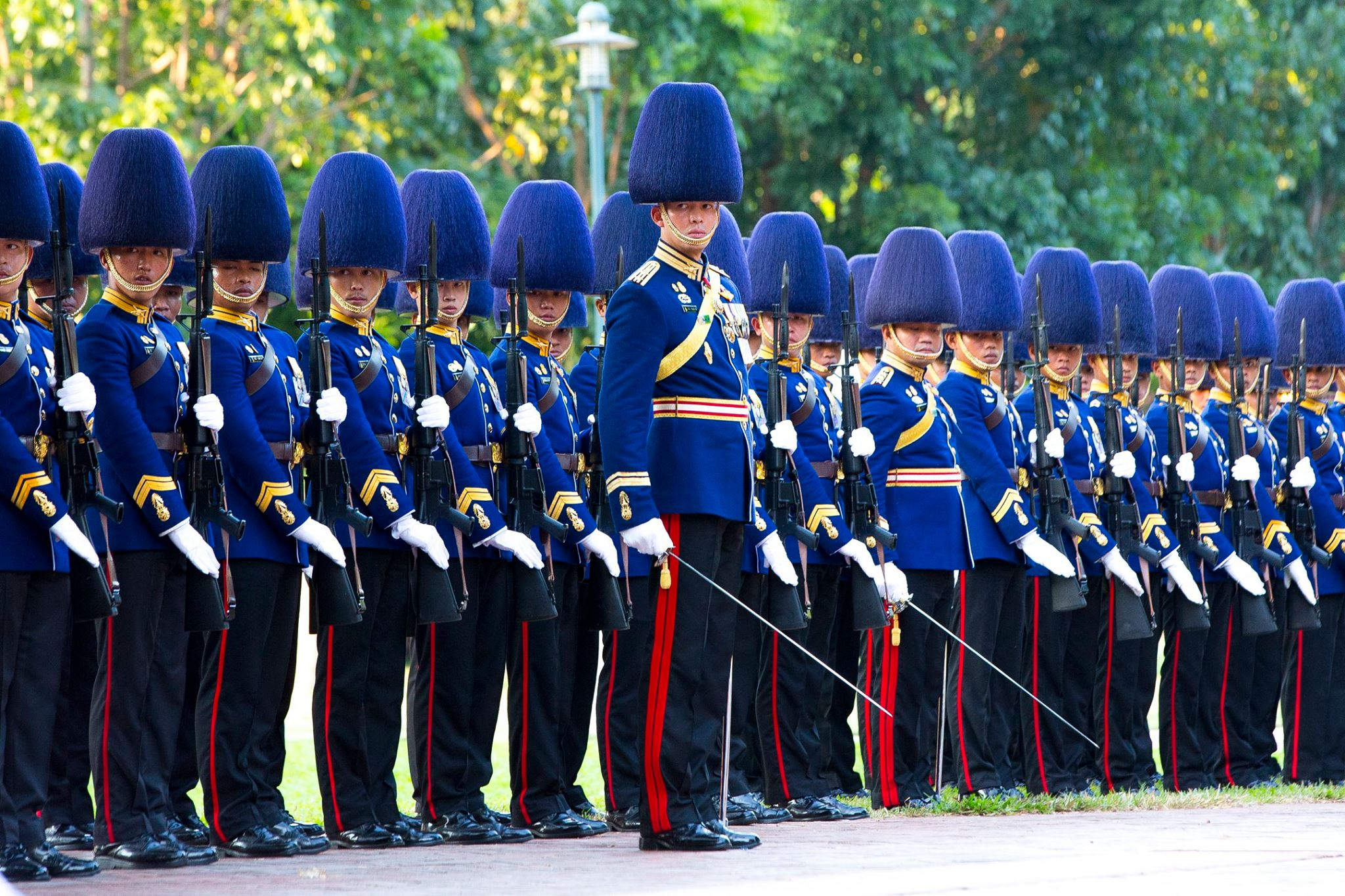
11th Infantry Regiment, King's Guard in 2019

== See also ==
- List of army units called Guards
- King's Guard (Thailand)
- Thai Royal Guards parade
- Monarchy of Thailand
- Head of the Royal Thai Armed Forces
- 11th Infantry Regiment BTS station
