= 1st Infantry Regiment (Thailand) =

21st King Close Bodyguard Regiment, King's Guard
- กรมทหารมหาดเล็กราชวัลลภที่ 21 รักษาพระองค์
- Rajawallop insignia, the official emblem of the 1st Infantry Regiment, King's Close Bodyguard
- Active: 1859–present
- Country: Thailand
- Branch: Royal Security Command
- Type: Royal guard
- Size: 3 Battalion
- Part of: Royal Security Command
- Garrison/HQ: Bang Khen District, Bangkok
- Nicknames: Mahat Lek Rajawallop (มหาดเล็กราชวัลลภ, King's close bodyguards); Thahan Song Lo (ทหารสองโหล, Two-Dozen soldiers); Mahat Lek Lai Ka (มหาดเล็กไล่กา, Scarecrow Corps)
- Colors: Red – White
- March: Royal Guards March (มาร์ชราชวัลลภ, March Raja Vallobh)
- Engagements: Haw wars; Franco-Siamese conflict; World War I; Western Front; Boworadet rebellion; World War II; Franco-Thai War; Battle of Banphlao; Pacific War; Japanese invasion of Thailand; South-East Asian theatre; Burma campaign; Cold War; Korean War; Vietnam War; Communist insurgency in Thailand; Vietnamese border raids in Thailand; Thai–Laotian Border War; South Thailand insurgency
- Decorations: Bravery Medal (2nd Battalion) King Rama VIII Royal Cypher Medal, 1st Class King Rama IX Royal Cypher Medal, 1st Class
- Website: www.1stinfantryreg.in.th

Insignia
- Unit colours

The 21st King Close Bodyguard Regiment, King's Guard (Thai: กรมทหารมหาดเล็กราชวัลลภที่ 21 รักษาพระองค์) (กรม.ทม.ร.21 รอ.) is a King's Guard regiment under the Royal Security Command. The regiment is divided into three battalions, all of them based in Bangkok. The regiment is the only unit of the Royal Thai Armed Forces with the designation Mahat Lek Rajawallop (Thai: มหาดเล็กราชวัลลภ); meaning the king's close bodyguards, translated as the King's Own Bodyguards. The unit was first established by King Chulalongkorn (Rama V) in 1859, whilst he was still a young prince. One of the primary roles of the regiment is to provide security and protection to members of the Thai royal family as well as the ceremonial escort and guarding of the royal palaces. The unit is the oldest regiment of the Thai army.

== History ==
The Royal Guards were established by King Chulalongkorn (Rama V) of Siam in 1859, when he was still a young prince. Initially, the Royal Guards were servants with duties such as scaring crows, which led to commoners referring to them as the "Mahat Lek Lai Ka," roughly translated as "Scarecrow Corps."

When he succeeded his father in 1868, King Chulalongkorn took his Royal Guard and formed a 24-strong Royal Bodyguard, referred to as the "Thahan Song Lo" (Two-Dozen soldiers"). In 1870, the unit was upgraded into a full army regiment and was given the name the "King's Guard" and their duties included escorting the king while he travelled around the country. The king commanded the regiment himself until 1873, when he appointed Lieutenant General Chao Phraya Phasakornwongse as its first military commander.

The Royal Guards still exist down to the present and serve as protectors of the royal family of Thailand.

On 18 January 2019, the unit has renamed to 1st Royal Guard Regiment, King's Guard. Then, on 23 April 2019, the unit has renamed again to 1st Infantry Regiment, King's Close Bodyguard.

On October 1, 2019, the command of the unit was transferred from the 1st Division, King's Guard to the Royal Security Command under the command of King Vajiralongkorn, along with 11th Infantry Regiment. Thereby removing the two units out of the chain of command of the Royal Thai Army and into the monarchy.

In 2026, the Unit has been renamed to 21st King Close Bodyguard Regiment, King's Guard.

== Organization ==
=== Active ===
- 1st King Close Bodyguard Battalion, 1st King Close Bodyguard Regiment, King Close Bodyguard
- 2nd King Close Bodyguard Battalion, 1st King Close Bodyguard Regiment, King Close Bodyguard
- Palace Guard Regiment, King Close Bodyguard Formerly 3rd Infantry Battalion, King's Own Bodyguard

=== Dissolved ===
- 4th Infantry Battalion, 1st King's Own Bodyguard Regiment (King Chulalongkorn's Own Guards) (amalgamated with the Royal Security Command and renamed to The King's Close Bodyguard Command in 2017)

== Notable members ==
- Prince Bhanurangsi Savangwongse Commander of the regiment 1879-1885
- Prince Damrong Rajanubhab Commander of the regiment 1885-1892
- Crown Prince Maha Vajiravudh (later King Rama VI) Commander of the regiment 1901-1910
- Prince Chakrabongse Bhuvanath Commander of the regiment 1910-1919
- Paribatra Sukhumbandhu Commander of the regiment 1923-1932
- Prince Mahidol Adulyadej as a special Colonel of the regiment in 1926
- Field Marshal Sarit Thanarat Commander of the regiment 1945–1948, Prime Minister of Thailand 1958-1963
- Field Marshal Praphas Charusathien Commander of the regiment 1948–1951, Commander in Chief of the Army 1964-1973
- General Kris Sivara, Commander in Chief of the Army 1973-1975
- HM King Maha Vajiralongkorn as an honorary Captain of the regiment in 1965 and a battalion commander in 1980
- Princess Maha Chakri Sirindhorn, the Princess Royal as an honorary Captain of the regiment in 1977

== Gallery ==
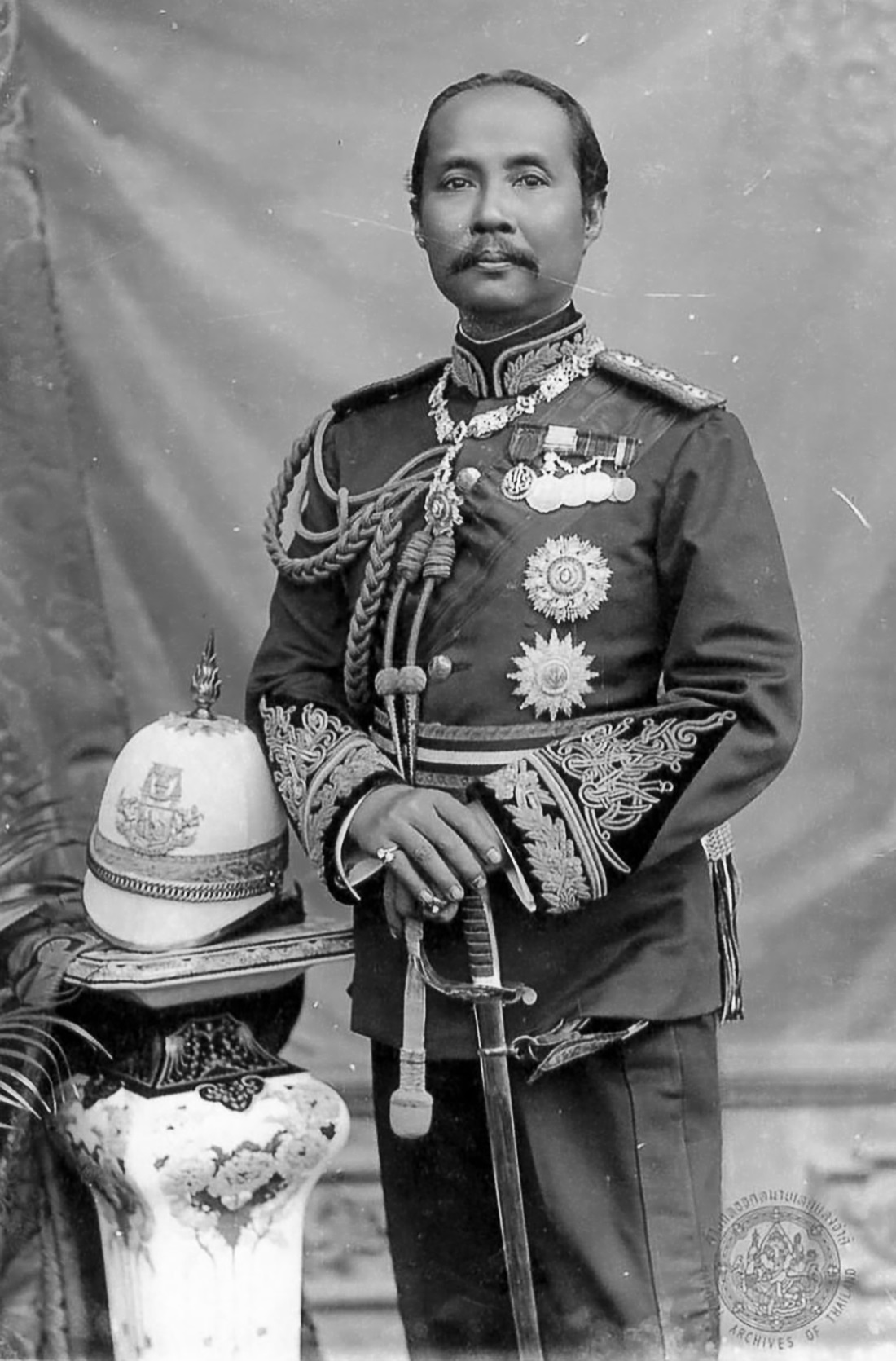
King Chulaongkorn, the founder of the unit, in the scarlet uniform of the regiment

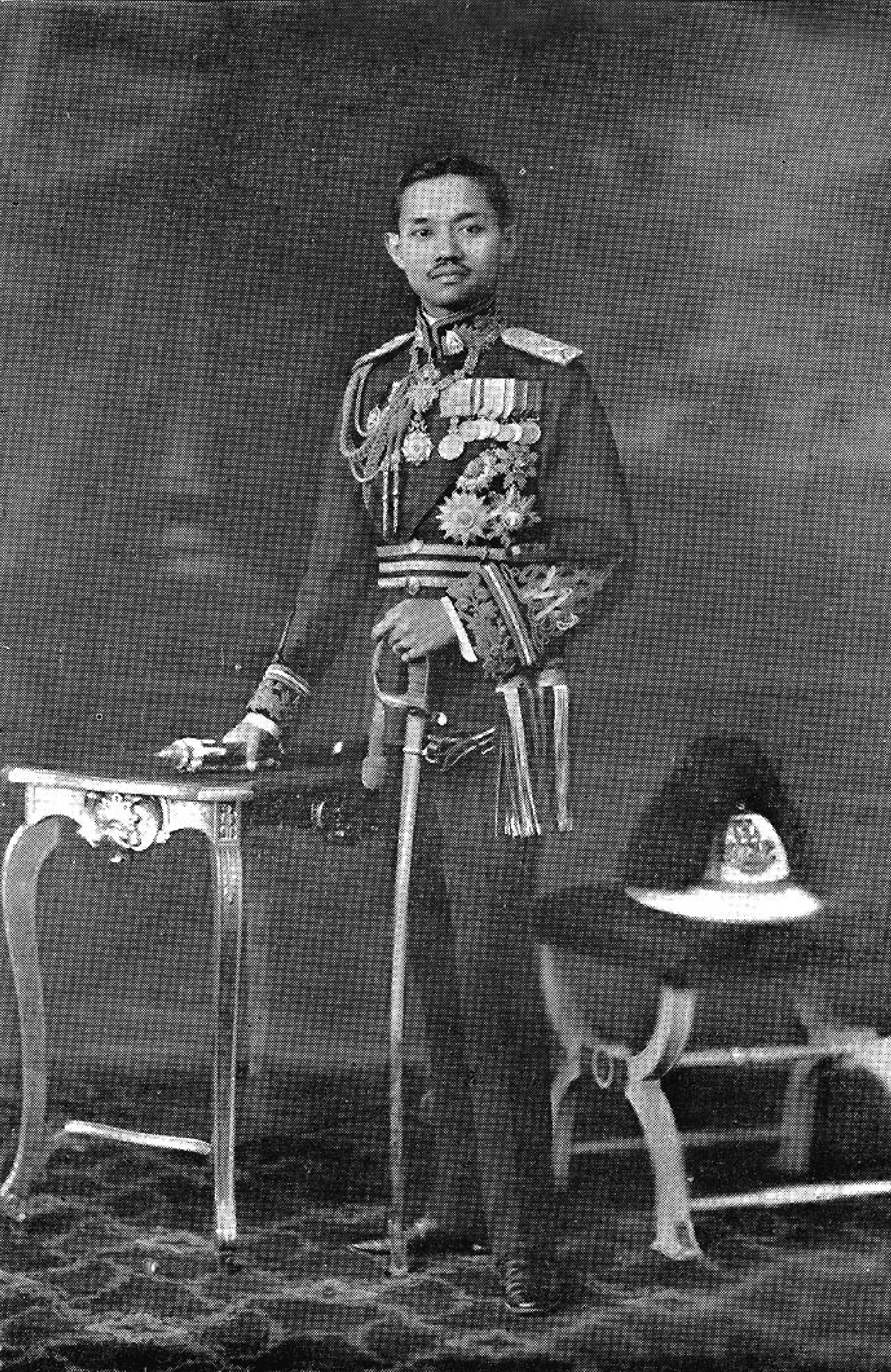
King Prajadhipok in the scarlet uniform, with the old style helmet to the right in the photograph

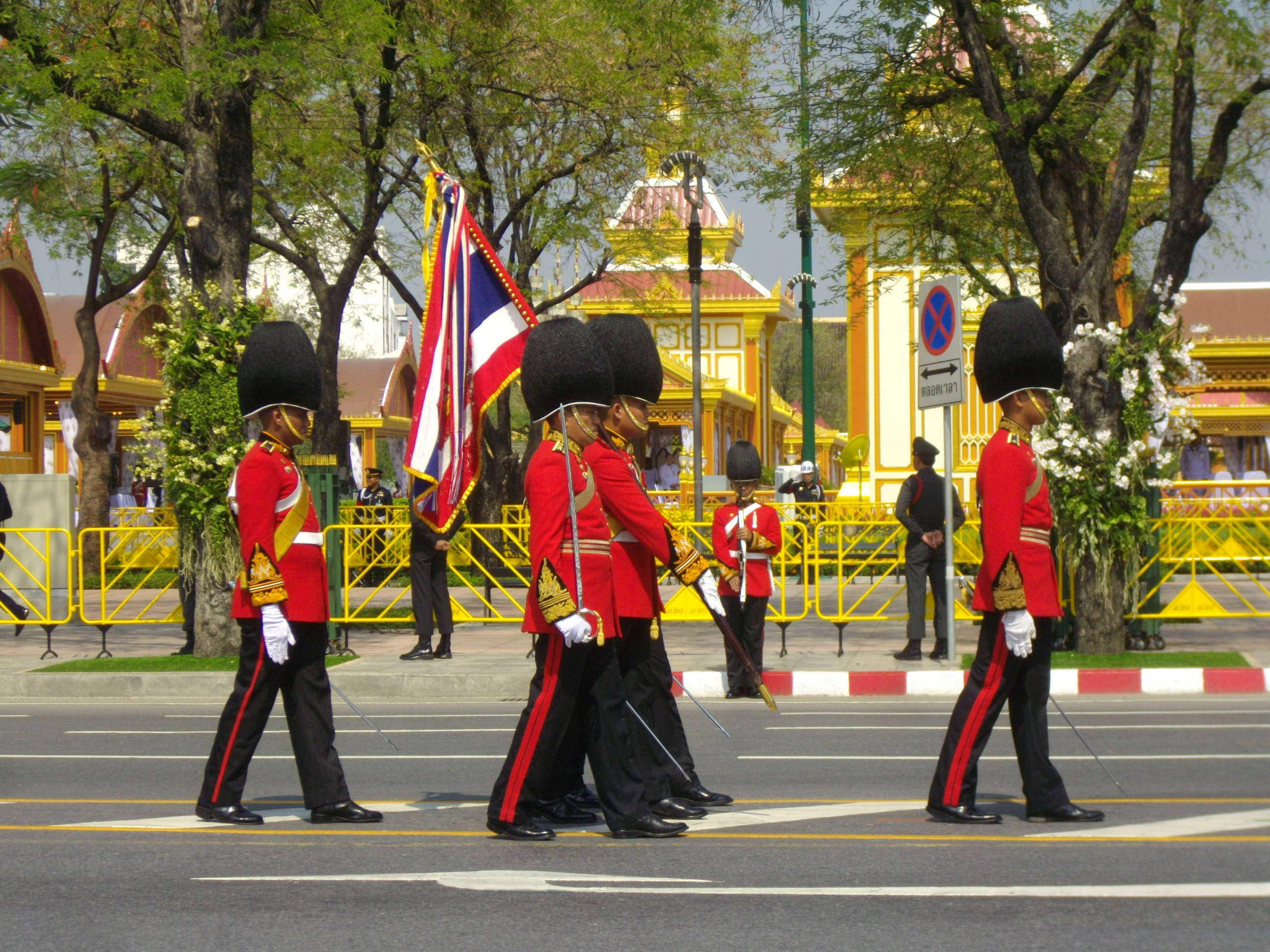
Regimental colours of the 1st King's Own Bodyguard Regiment

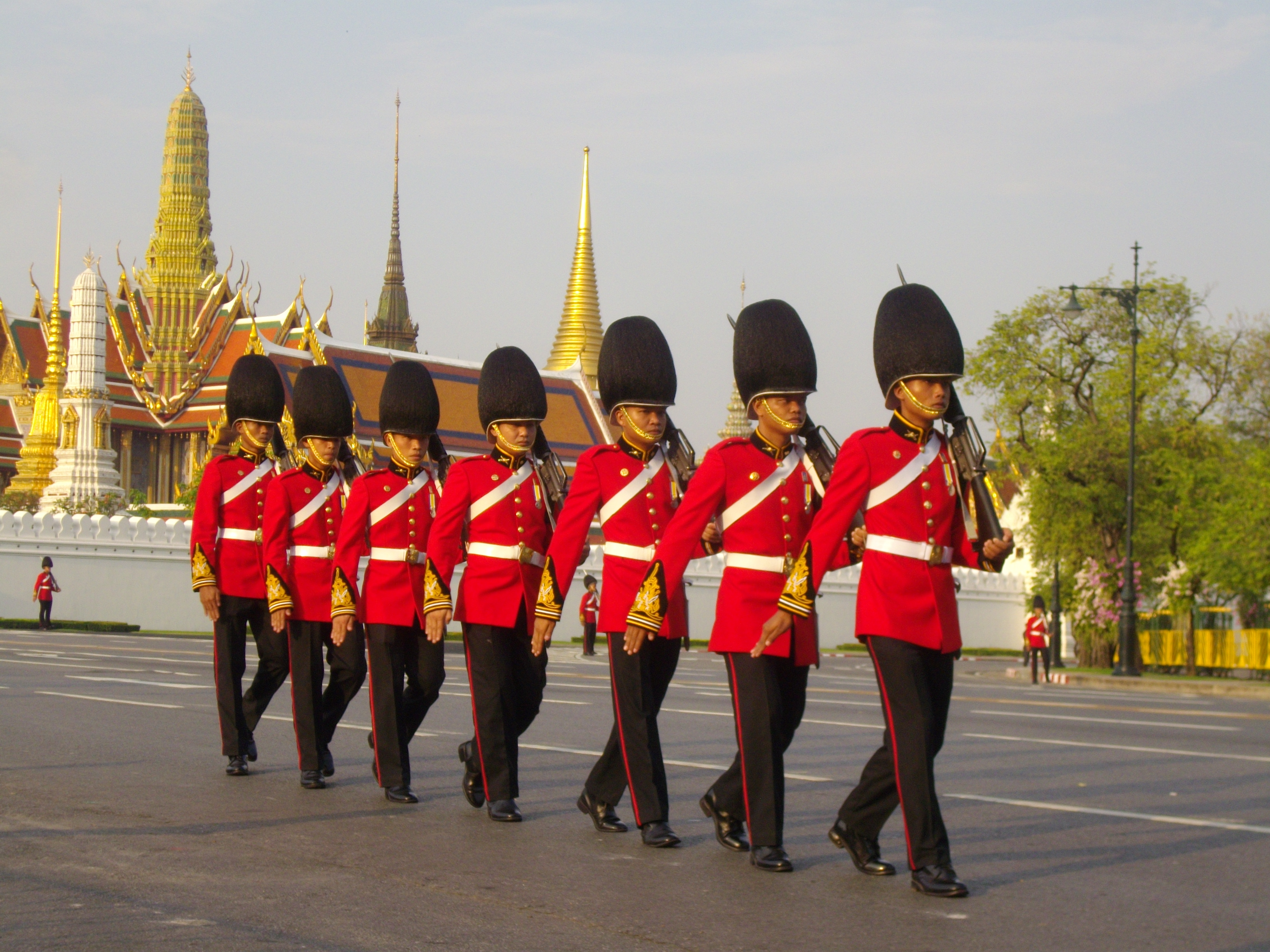
Red ceremonial uniform of the regiment, used by the 1st, 2nd battalion and former 4th battalion

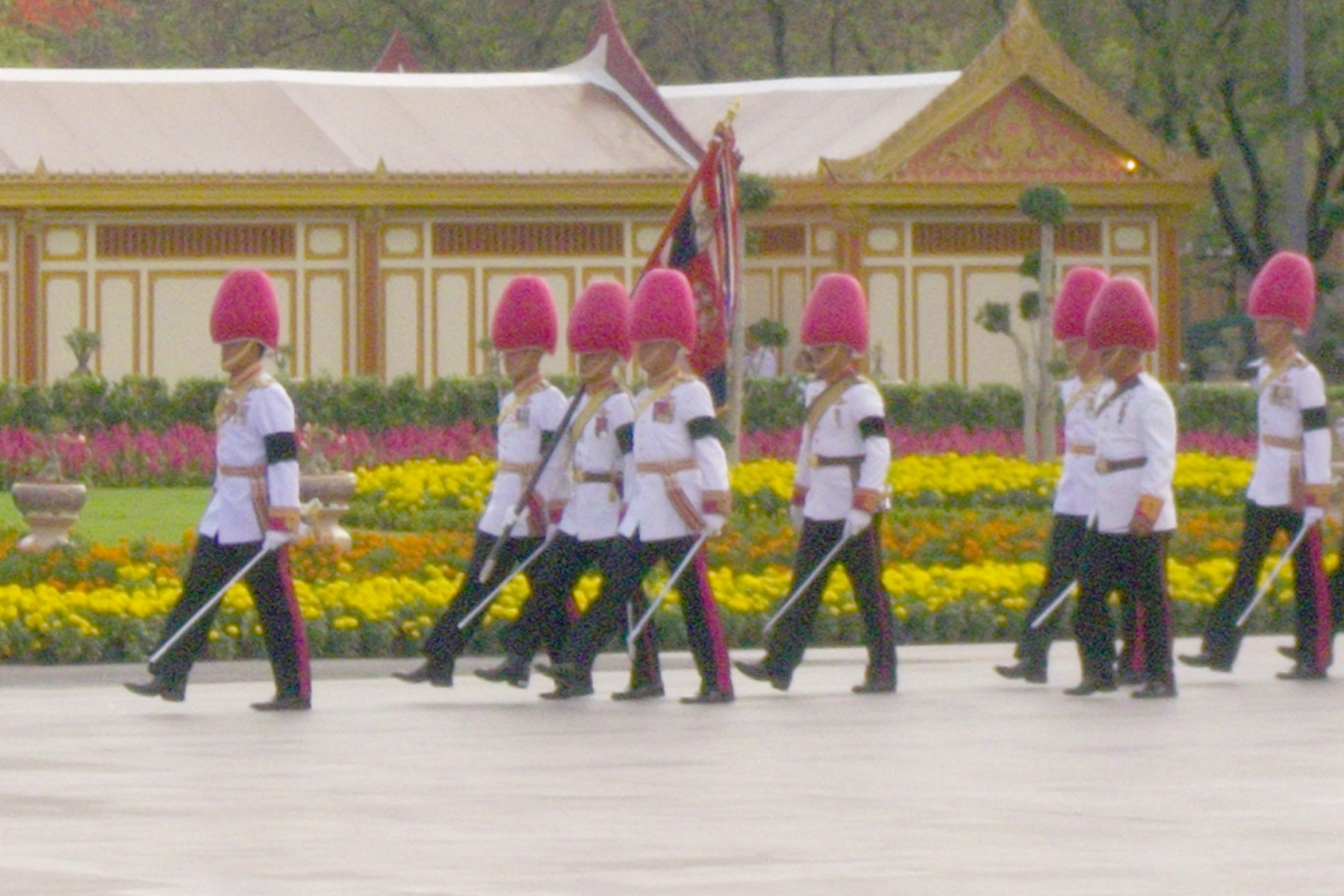
Distinctive white and pink uniform of the 3rd Battalion

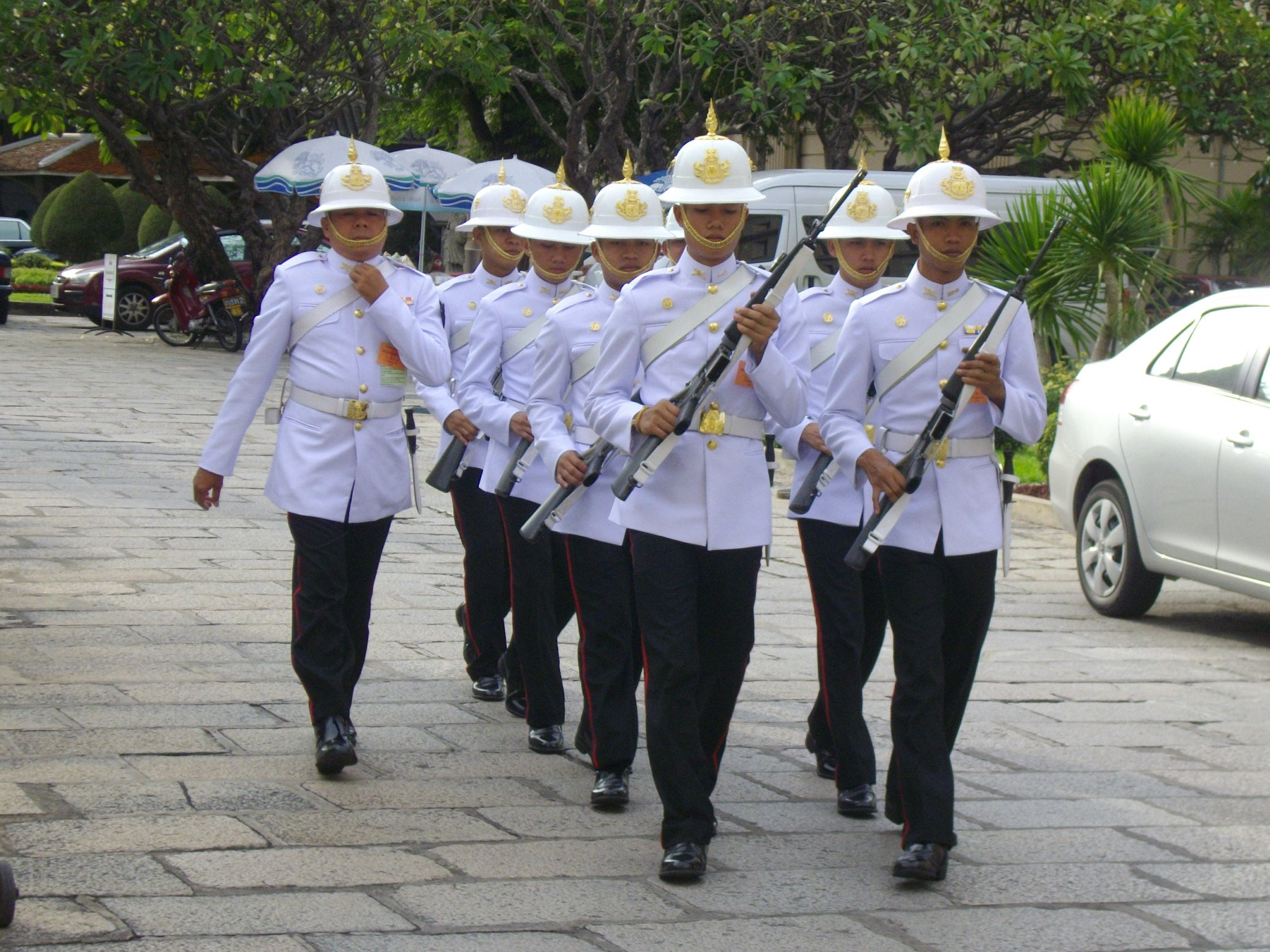
White uniforms of the regiment, changing of the guards at the Grand Palace in Bangkok

== See also ==
- List of army units called Guards
- King's Guard (Thailand)
- Thai Royal Guards parade
- Monarchy of Thailand
- Head of the Royal Thai Armed Forces
