= Higham, West Suffolk =

Village in Suffolk, England

Coordinates: 52.25275°N 0.55502°E

Higham
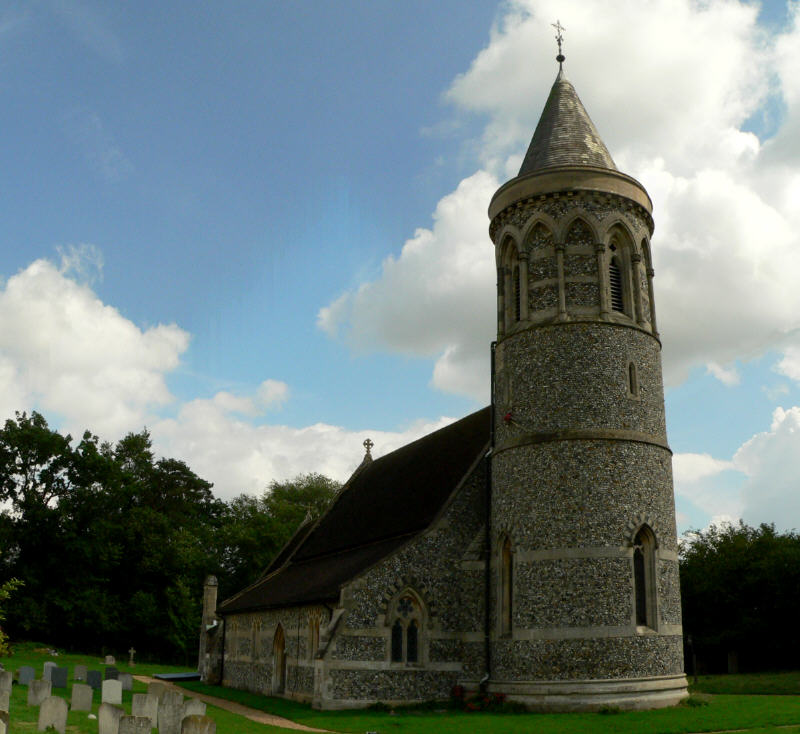
- Higham St Stephen

- Location within Suffolk
- Population: 156 (2011 Census)
- OS grid reference: TL744646
- District: West Suffolk
- Shire county: Suffolk
- Region: East
- Country: England
- Sovereign state: United Kingdom
- Post town: BURY ST. EDMUNDS
- Postcode district: IP28
- Dialling code: 01638
- Police: Suffolk
- Fire: Suffolk
- Ambulance: East of England
- UK Parliament: West Suffolk

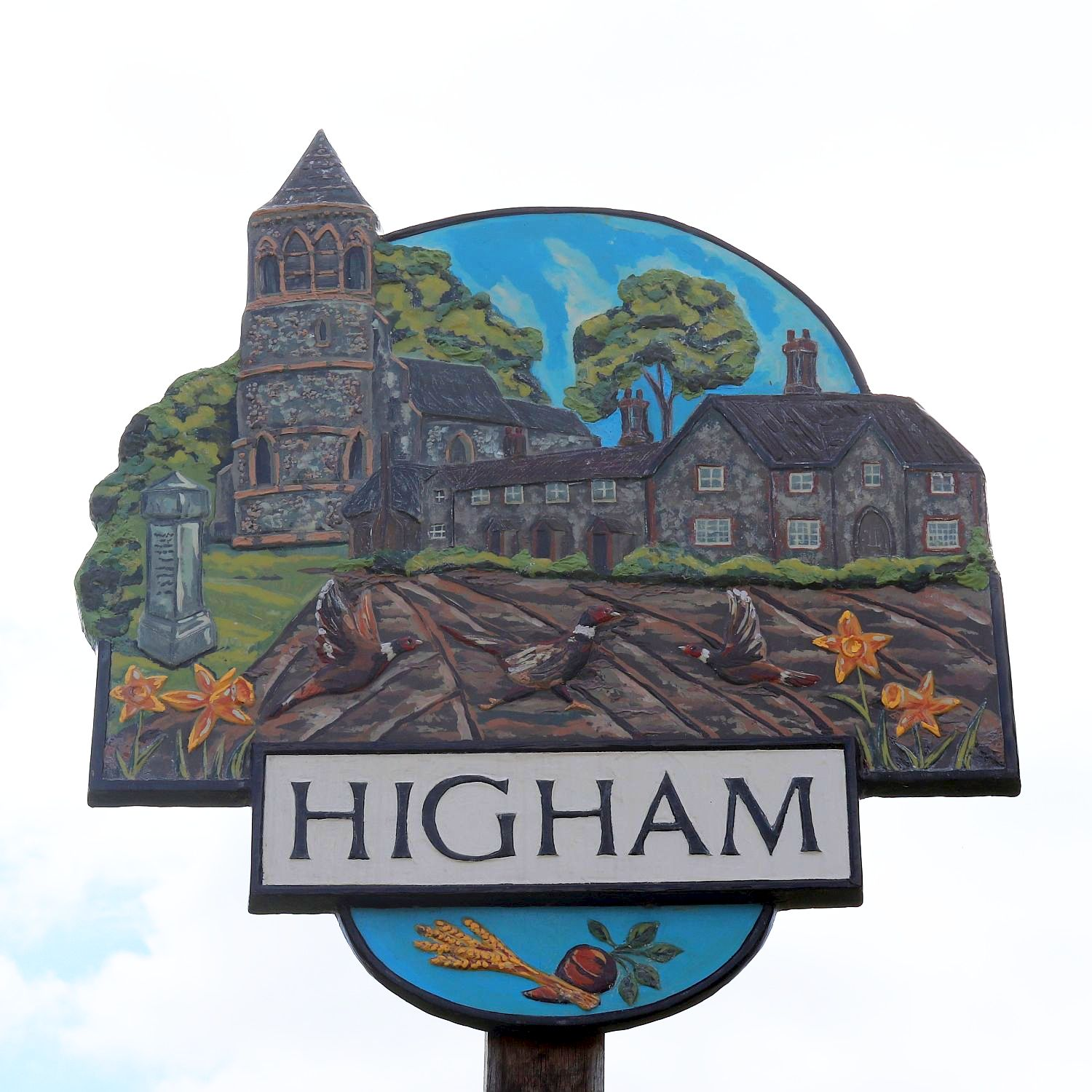
Higham village sign

Higham is a village and civil parish in the West Suffolk district of Suffolk in the east of England. Located midway between Bury St Edmunds and Newmarket, in 2005 its population was 140. Higham is split into three parts: Upper Green, Middle Green and Lower Green.

Prior to the Beeching Axe, the village was served by Higham railway station. Its church, St Stephen, is one of 38 existing round-tower churches in Suffolk.

== Geography ==
The Broom's Barn Experimental Station is in the village.
