= Vajiralongkorn =

King of Thailand since 2016

- King Rama X
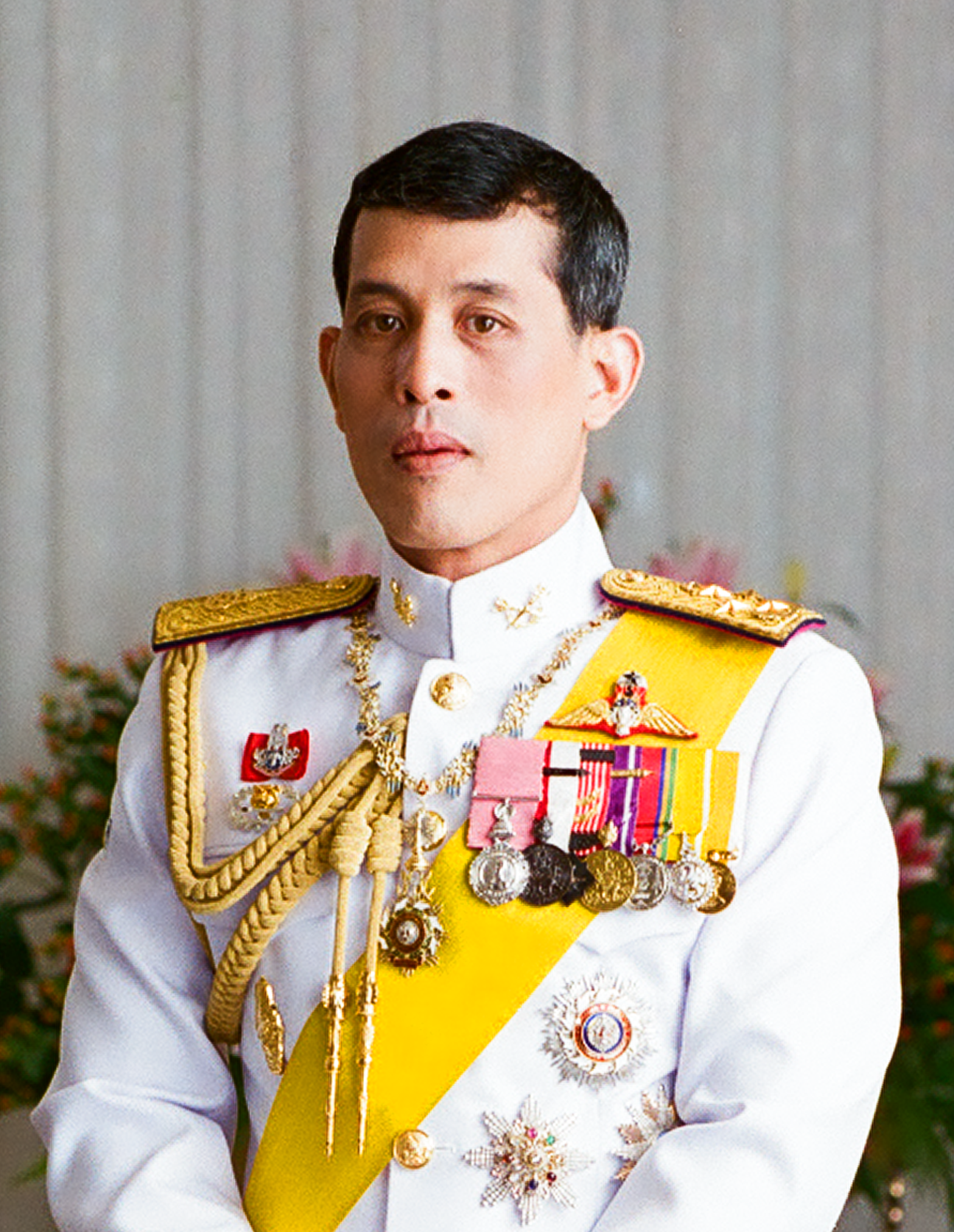
- Formal portrait, 2017

King of Thailand
- Reign: 13 October 2016 – present (Note: After a mourning period, on 1 December 2016, Vajiralongkorn accepted the formal invitation to become king. He was king retroactively to the day of his predecessor and father's death on 13 October 2016. Prem Tinsulanonda had acted as regent from that date.)
- Coronation: 4 May 2019
- Predecessor: Bhumibol Adulyadej (Rama IX)
- Heir presumptive: Dipangkorn Rasmijoti
- Regent: Prem Tinsulanonda (2016)
- Born: 28 July 1952 (age 74); Bangkok, Thailand
- Spouses: Soamsawali Kitiyakara (m. 1977; div. 1991) Yuvadhida Polpraserth (m. 1994; div. 1996) Srirasmi Suwadee (m. 2001; div. 2014) Suthida Tidjai (m. 2019) Niramon Ounprom (m. 2019)
- Issue Detail: Bajrakitiyabha, Princess Rajasarini Siribajra; Juthavachara Vivacharawongse; Vacharaesorn Vivacharawongse; Chakriwat Vivacharawongse; Vatchrawee Vivacharawongse; Princess Sirivannavari; Prince Dipangkorn Rasmijoti
- House: Mahidol (Note: In the Thai tradition, the house (ราชสกุล) is distinct from the dynasty (ราชวงศ์). Vajiralongkorn is the third king of the House of Mahidol (ราชสกุลมหิดล) and the tenth king of the Chakri dynasty (ราชวงศ์จักรี).)
- Dynasty: Chakri
- Father: Bhumibol Adulyadej (Rama IX)
- Mother: Sirikit Kitiyakara
- Religion: Theravada Buddhism
- Military career
- Allegiance: Kingdom of Thailand
- Branch: Royal Thai Army; Royal Security Command
- Service years: 1977–present
- Rank: Field marshal
- Commands: 4th Infantry Battalion, 1st Infantry Regiment; Royal Security Command

Vajiralongkorn (Note: Thai: วชิราลงกรณ; RTGS: Wachiralongkon, pronounced [wá.tɕʰí.rāː.lōŋ.kɔ̄ːn]) (born 28 July 1952), also known by his regnal name Rama X, is King of Thailand, reigning since 2016. He is the tenth monarch of the Chakri dynasty, succeeding his father, King Bhumibol Adulyadej (Rama IX).

The only son of King Bhumibol Adulyadej and Queen Sirikit, Vajiralongkorn was educated in Thailand, the United Kingdom, and Australia, graduating from the Royal Military College, Duntroon. He served as an officer in the Royal Thai Army, training with British, Australian, and United States armed forces, and qualified as a military fast-jet and commercial airline pilot. He saw active combat against the Communist Party of Thailand (CPT) during the 1970s. Designated crown prince in 1972, he assumed the throne following his father's death on 13 October 2016, requesting a brief delay before his formal proclamation on 1 December 2016. His coronation took place from 4 to 6 May 2019.

Vajiralongkorn's reign has seen a marked centralisation of royal power and personal wealth. Shortly after ascending the throne, he requested changes to the draft 2017 Constitution of Thailand regarding royal prerogatives, took direct ownership of the vast assets managed by the Crown Property Bureau, and brought key military and security units under direct royal command. His political interventions, extensive residence in Germany during his early reign, and lifestyle generated significant domestic and international media attention. These factors contributed to the 2020–2021 Thai protests, which saw unprecedented public scrutiny of the monarchy and widespread calls to reform the institution and loosen Thailand's strict lèse-majesté laws.

Vajiralongkorn has been married five times and has seven children, including Dipangkorn Rasmijoti, the heir presumptive. He is the wealthiest monarch in the world, with an estimated net worth between US$30 billion and US$70 billion.

== Early life and education ==
Vajiralongkorn was born on 28 July 1952 at 17:45 in the Amphorn Sathan Residential Hall of the Dusit Palace in Bangkok.

Vajiralongkorn began his education in 1956 when he entered kindergarten at the Chitralada School in Dusit Palace. After completing Mathayom 1 (grade seven), he was educated at private schools in the United Kingdom, first at King's Mead prep school, Seaford, Sussex, and later at Millfield School in Somerset, where he completed his secondary education in July 1970. In August 1970, he attended a five-week military training course at The King's School in Sydney, Australia.

=== University ===
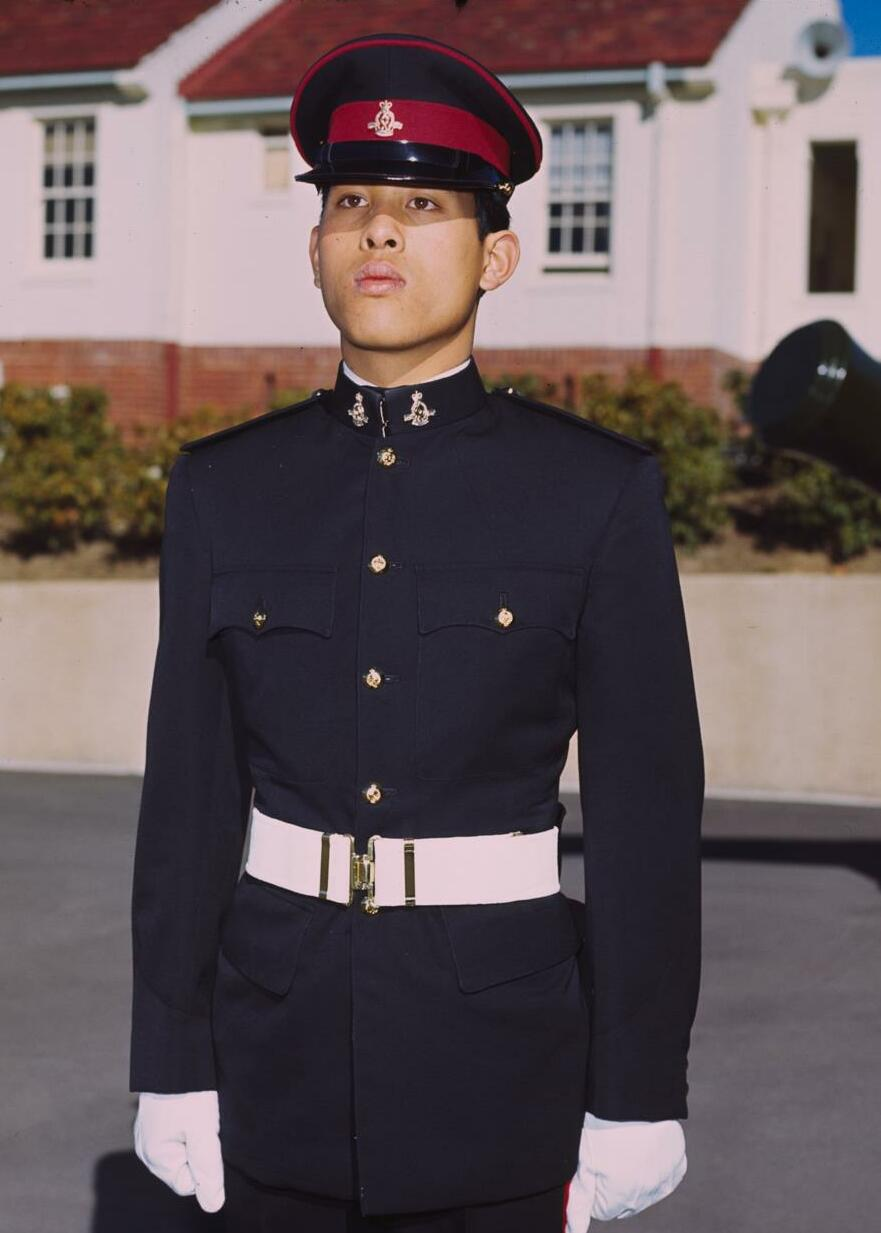
Vajiralongkorn in 1972 as a student at Australia's Royal Military College, Duntroon

In 1972, the prince enrolled at the Royal Military College, Duntroon in Canberra, Australia. His education at Duntroon was divided into two parts, military training by the Australian Army and a bachelor's degree course under the auspices of the University of New South Wales. He graduated in 1976 as a new lieutenant with a liberal arts degree in military studies. That year, he also spent time training with the Special Air Service Regiment in Perth.

In 1982, he completed a second bachelor's degree in law, with second-class honors at Sukhothai Thammathirat Open University.

== Heir apparent and social interest ==
Vajiralongkorn was proclaimed crown prince on 28 December 1972 at 12:23 in the Ananta Samakhom Throne Hall, making him the third crown prince of the Chakri dynasty.

=== Short-term monastic life ===
On 6 November 1978, at the age of 26, the prince was ordained as a monk at Wat Phra Kaew. As is traditional for royals, he stayed at Wat Bowonniwet Vihara for 15 days, under the monastic name "Vajiralongkornno".

=== Military training and career ===
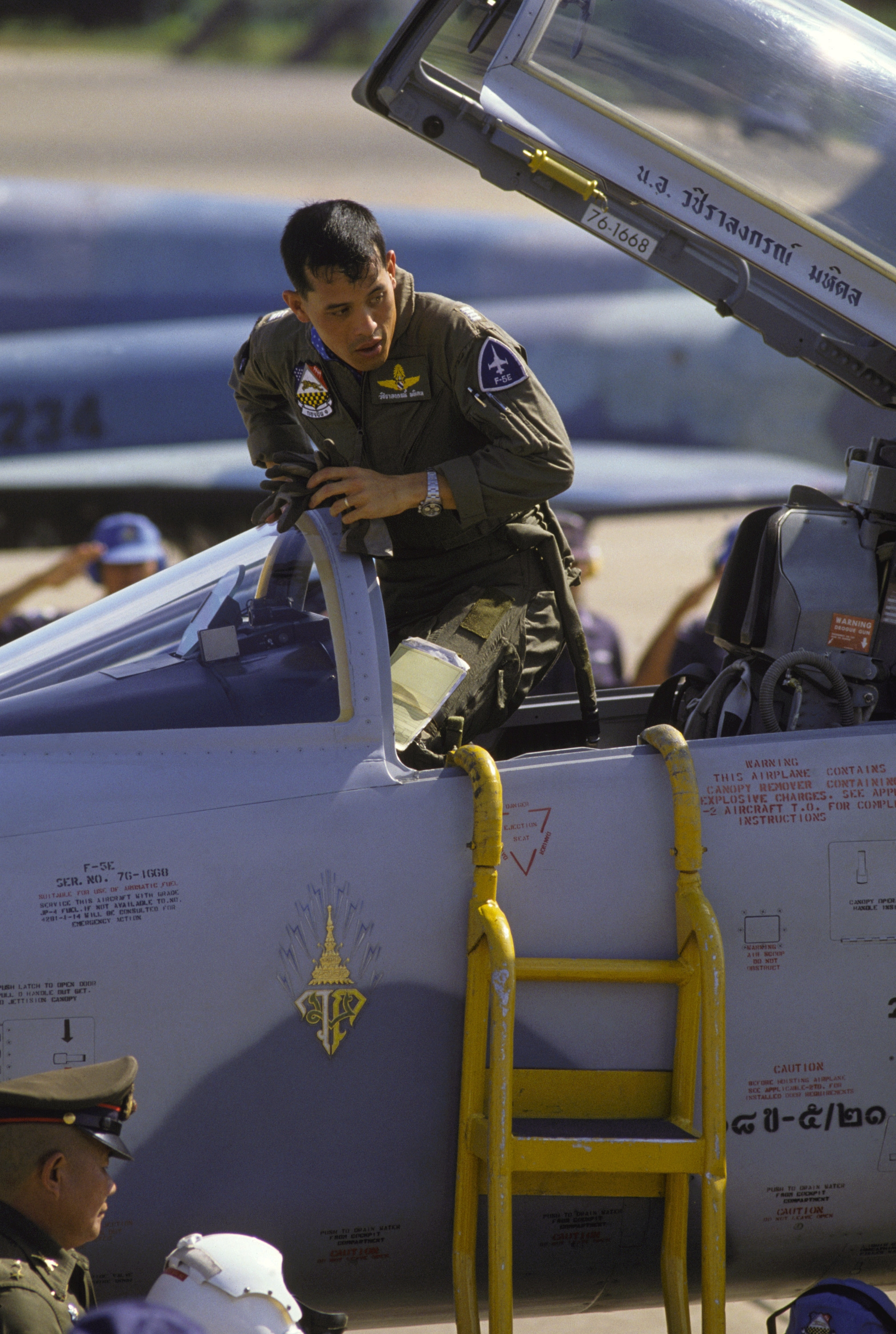
Vajiralongkorn climbing out of the cockpit of an F-5E Tiger II aircraft

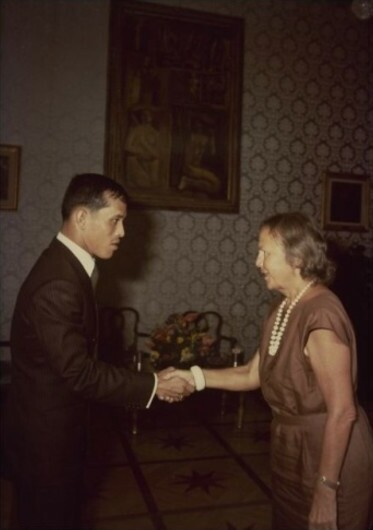
Vajiralongkorn with Nilde Iotti in 1985

After completing his studies, Vajiralongkorn served as a career officer in the Royal Thai Army. He started his army career as a staff officer in the Directorate of Army Intelligence and attended the Command and General Staff College in 1977. After that he became Deputy Commander of the King Chulalongkorn's Own Guards, the 4th Infantry Battalion, 1st Infantry Regiment in 1978. In 1980 he was appointed as a Commander of the 4th Infantry Battalion, 1st Infantry Regiment. In 1992 he became Commander of the Royal Security Command.

He is a military pilot qualified to fly the Northrop F-5, F-16, and the Boeing 737-400. His military role in recent years has become increasingly ceremonial. As his father grew older, Vajiralongkorn took a more prominent part in royal ceremonial and public appearances. He officially opened the 2007 Southeast Asian Games, held in Nakhon Ratchasima. The event occurred one day after the 80th birthday of his father.

=== Medical and health care ===
Vajiralongkorn established "Crown Prince Hospitals" through funds donated by the public to serve as medical and health care centers for people living in remote areas. Crown Prince Hospitals had been set up in 21 locations in 1977. These hospitals had become major community hospitals providing services of international standards to the general public in 2011.

=== Agricultural development ===
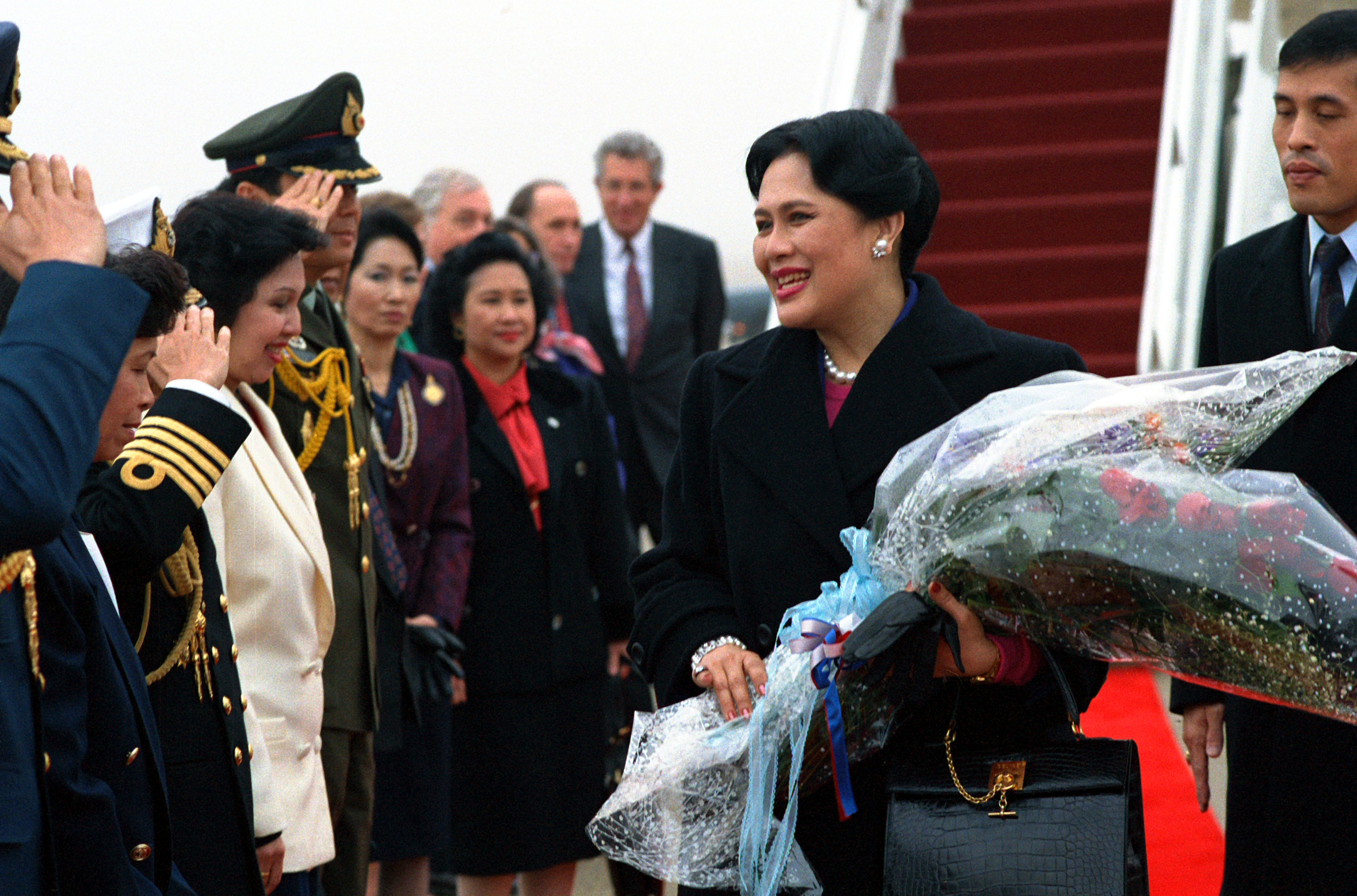
Vajiralongkorn (right) with his mother Queen Sirikit, 1991

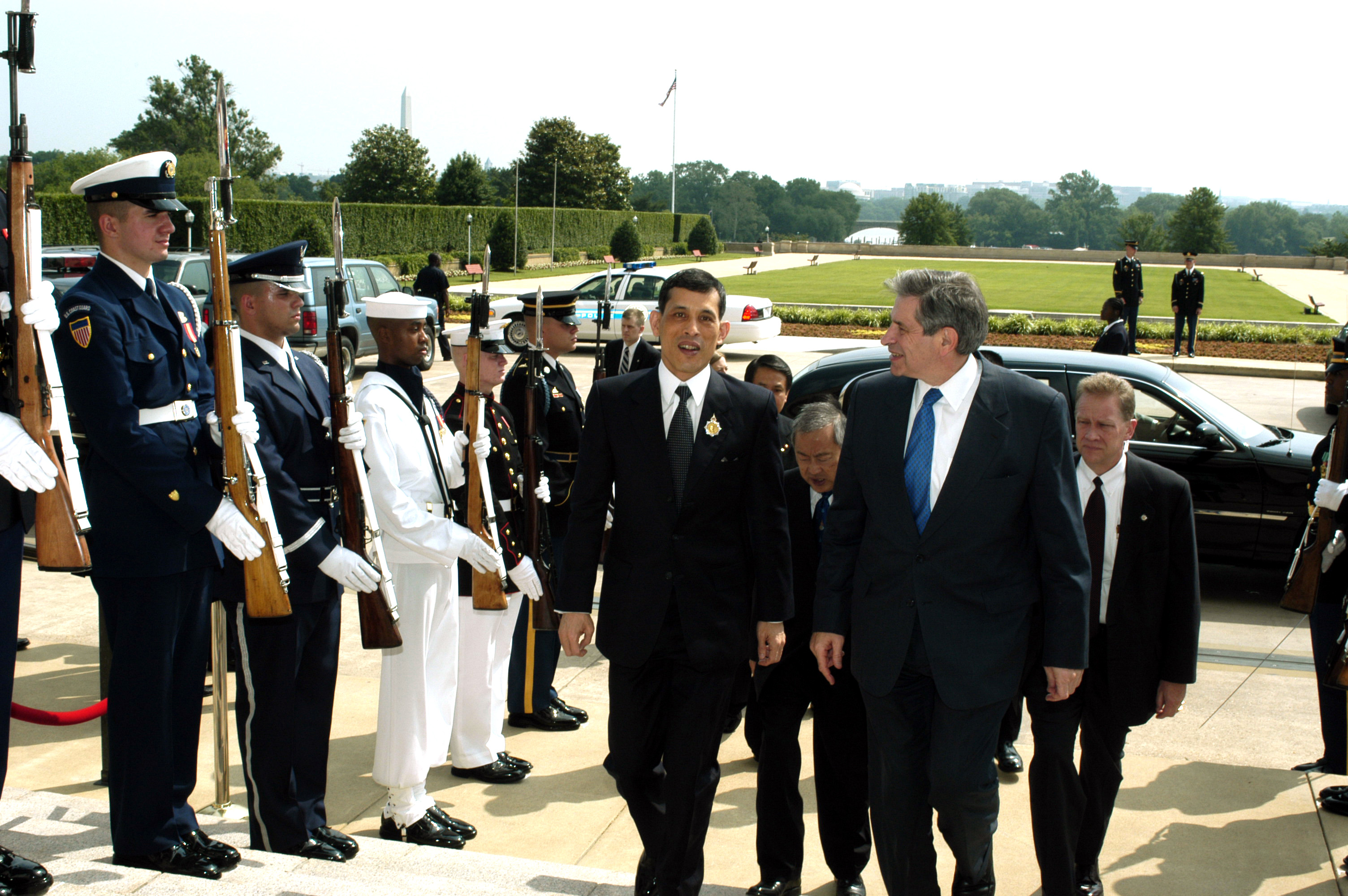
US Deputy Secretary of Defense Paul Wolfowitz (right) escorts Crown Prince Maha Vajiralongkorn to the Pentagon, 12 June 2003

Also interested in agricultural development, Vajiralongkorn has accepted the "Mobile Agricultural Clinic Project" under his patronage. The project provides prompt services to farmers to enhance efficiency in farm production and solve farmers' problems. It provides experts in various agricultural fields who can advise farmers on plants, livestock, fisheries, and land development. He also offers suggestions on tackling agricultural problems and applying agricultural technology to increase productivity and improvement in the quality of agricultural production.

Mobile Agricultural Clinic teams can move quickly to various spots in need of help. It has worked steadily and is ready to provide technical services and transfer technology. With this project, farmers have been urged to be aware of agricultural development and new technology.

In the later years of the reign of his father, Bhumibol Adulyadej, Vajiralongkorn represented the king in presiding over the annual Royal Ploughing Ceremony, which is meaningful to Thai farmers as an early practice of phytopathology in the country. Aware of the importance of efficient agriculture for better productivity, Vajiralongkorn emphasized full-cycle agricultural activities, believing they will help improve farmers' quality of life, who are traditionally considered the backbone of the nation. Since becoming king himself, Vajiralongkorn has presided over and participated in the ceremony in his own right.

In honour of his coronation, the Rice Department released five new rice cultivars, and the King has continued patronage of the royal rice varieties competition, the tradition of his ancestor Chulalongkorn.

=== Focus on education ===
Vajiralongkorn has initiated education projects to improve children's access to quality learning and instill the concept of lifelong learning. He has special ties to the Rajabhat University system of 40 institutions of higher learning. The chairman of the Council of Rajabhat University Presidents of Thailand said that Vajiralongkorn has presided over commencement ceremonies at all Rajabhat Universities nationwide and personally handed out degrees to all Rajabhat university graduates every year since 1978. It is estimated that over the past 35 years, at least 2,100,000 degrees have been handed out by the crown prince to Rajabhat graduates. He also donates 42 million baht annually to a scholarship fund benefiting Rajabhat students.

=== Sport interest ===
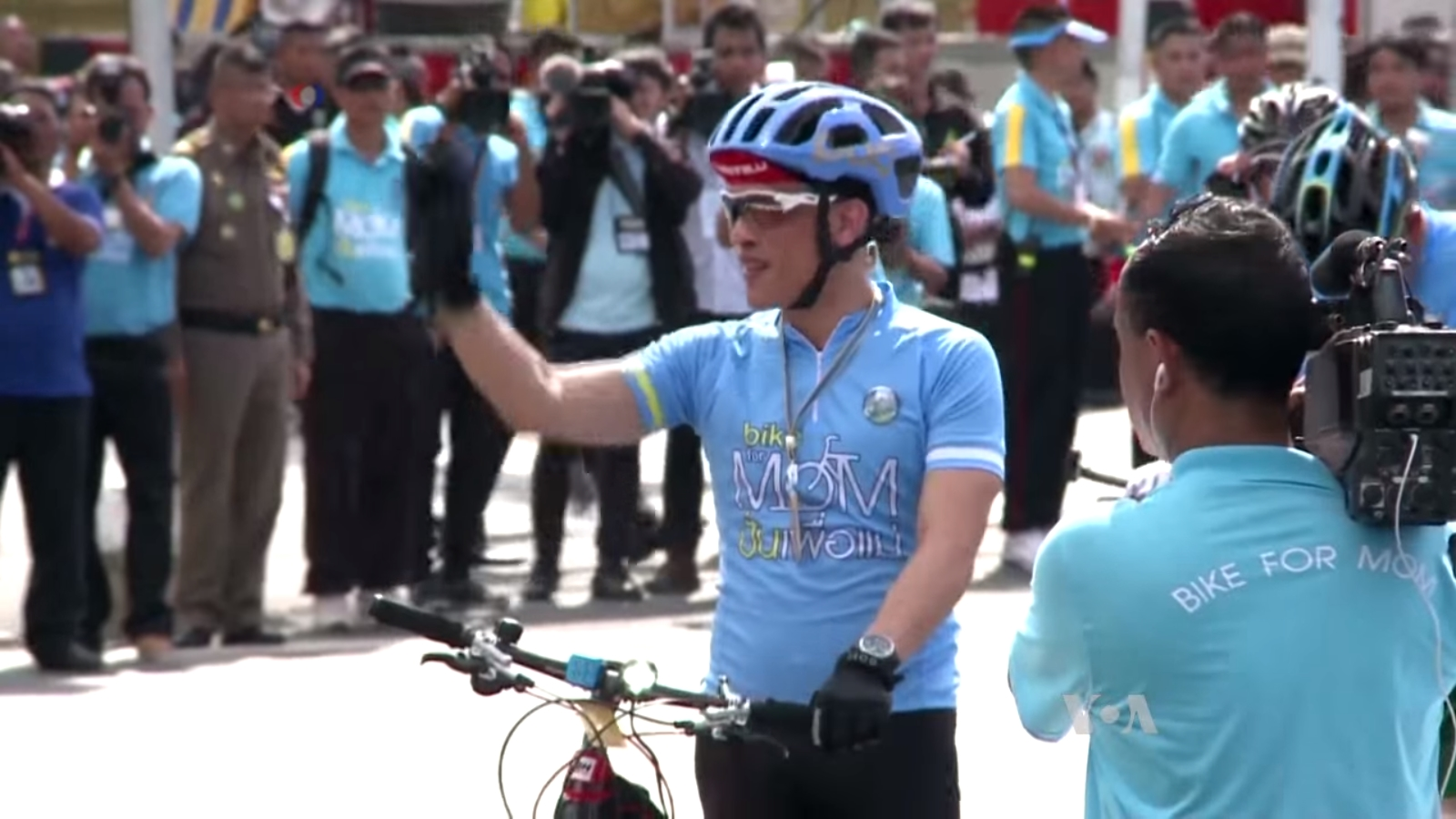
Vajiralongkorn at the 2015 Bike for Mom cycling parade

Vajiralongkorn was once known as the "Football Prince" but is known for his cycling involvement. He has also shown keen interest in other sports since he was young. He learned horseback riding when he was about 11 years old and soon became a capable rider. While studying in Thailand and abroad, he played several sports with friends, including football, rugby, and rowing.

Vajiralongkorn also competed in sailing with King Bhumibol and sister Princess Ubolratana when they stayed at Klai Kangwon Palace in Hua Hin. In football, Vajiralongkorn first played as a forward and later became a center-back at Chitralada School, Millfield School in England, and the Royal Military College, Duntroon, in Australia. He shares his love of the sport with his father.

=== Residence ===
Most of the time, Vajiralongkorn lives in Bavaria in Germany, where he has spent a significant amount of his adulthood. His son, Dipangkorn Rasmijoti, goes to school in the area. As king, Vajiralongkorn requested and received changes to the constitution to end the requirement that he appoint a regent when he is away from Thailand. In comparison, his father often made state visits early during his reign, but he left the country only once after the 1960s for an overnight stay in neighboring Laos. Vajiralongkorn has also received visits from Thai officials and dignitaries in Germany. According to the German foreign ministry, the Thai ambassador had been told multiple times that Germany opposes "having guests in our country who run their state affairs from here." Thai officials said that the prime minister was responsible for government matters, while the king was in Germany for personal reasons.

== Reign ==
=== Accession ===
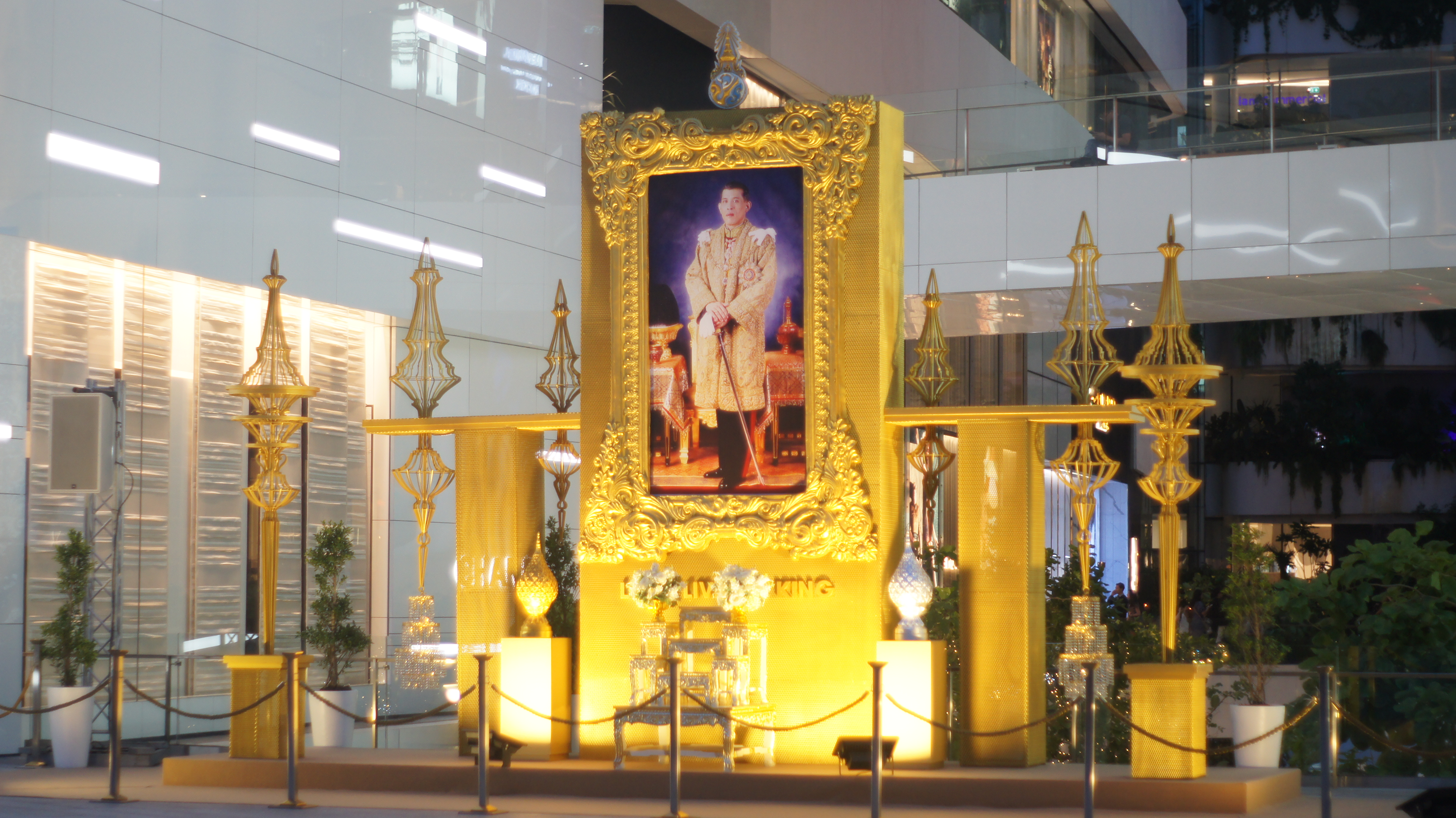
Portrait of King Vajiralongkorn inside EmQuartier shopping mall, 2017

After the death of Bhumibol Adulyadej on 13 October 2016, Vajiralongkorn was expected to succeed to the throne of Thailand, as the cabinet had instructed the president of the National Assembly to invite him to becoming king under the 2007 Constitution. Vajiralongkorn asked for time to mourn before formally taking the throne. On the night of 1 December 2016, the fiftieth day after the death of Bhumibol, Regent Prem Tinsulanonda led the heads of the country's three branches of government to an audience with Vajiralongkorn to invite him to ascend to the throne as the tenth king of the Chakri dynasty. Vajiralongkorn accepted the invitation, saying in a televised statement: "I would like to accept in order to fulfill his majesty's wishes and for the benefit of all Thais." Vajiralongkorn became the first monarch to be born in Thailand since his great-uncle Prajadhipok died in 1935. The government retroactively declared his reign to have begun upon his father's death, but it would not crown him formally until after the cremation of his father. The remains were then cremated on 26 October 2017. Currently, his main residence is Amphorn Sathan Residential Hall, with the king having moved from Nonthaburi Palace in 2011.

=== Appointment of members of the privy council ===
Following the resignation of the councillors to Bhumibol Adulyadej, Vajiralongkorn appointed 10 members of the Privy Council. The command was issued under Section 2 of the 2014 interim constitution, completed with Sections 12, 13 and 16 of the 2007 constitution on the king which were retained and remain in effect. The remaining seven members are Surayud Chulanont, Kasem Wattanachai, Palakorn Suwanrath, Atthaniti Disatha-amnarj, Supachai Poo-ngam, Chanchai Likhitjitta and Chalit Pukbhasuk, with three new members, Paiboon Koomchaya, Dapong Ratanasuwan, and Teerachai Nakwanich. Prem Tinsulanonda was re-appointed Privy Council president by royal command. On 13 December 2016, the King appointed two new members, Wirach Chinvinitkul and Charunthada Karnasuta. On 25 December 2016, the King appointed one more new member, Kampanart Rooddit. On 19 January 2017, Privy Councillor Chanchai Likhitjitta died at the age of 71.

=== Direct political interference ===
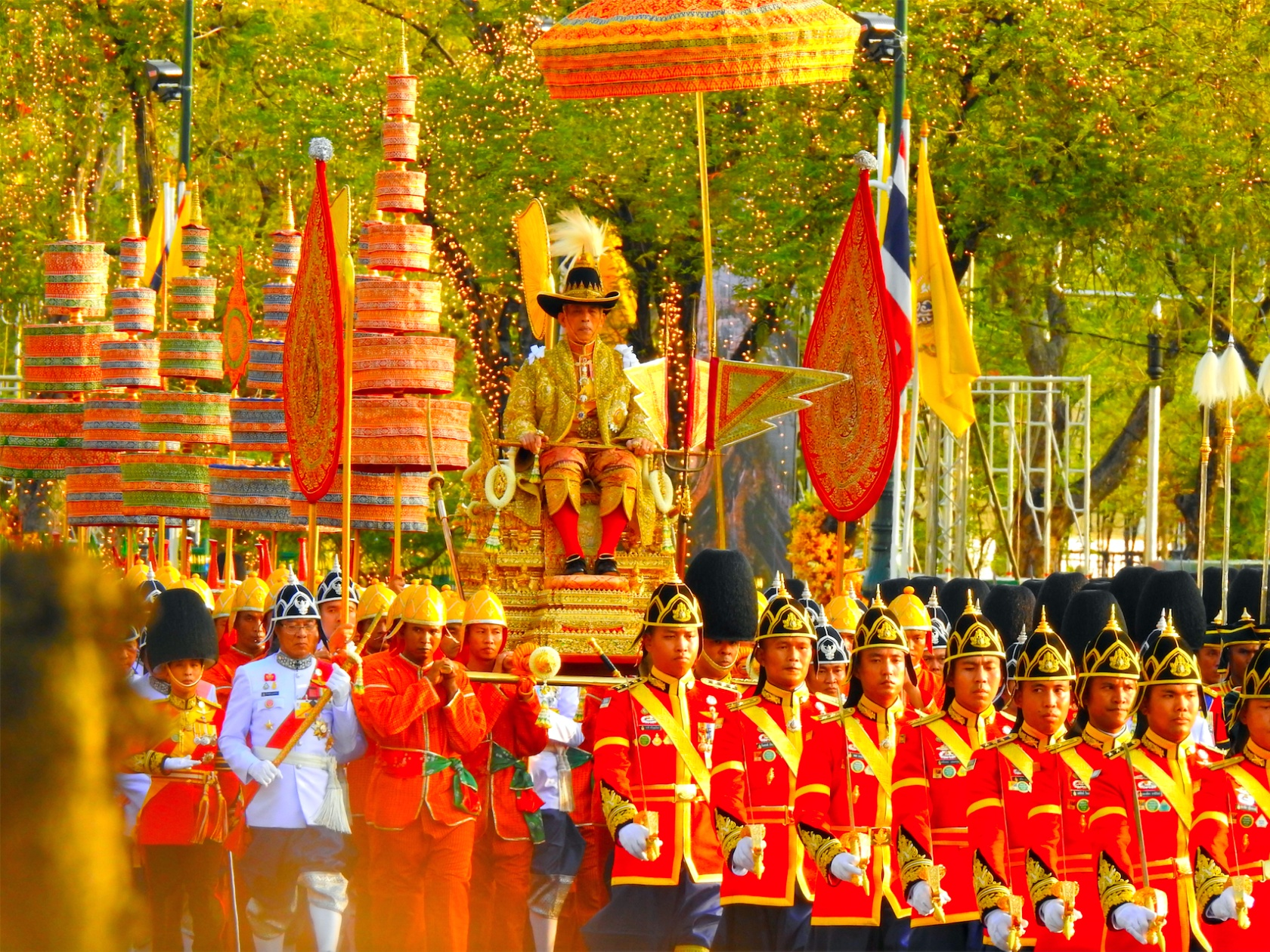
Vajiralongkorn's coronation

Thailand's military-appointed parliament voted overwhelmingly in January 2017 to make amendments to the interim constitution, so as to allow amendments to the draft constitution as suggested by the new king's office. Critics said the new constitution would give the military a powerful political say for years or decades. The 2017 Constitution of Thailand was approved in a referendum in 2016, and was endorsed by Vajiralongkorn on 6 April 2017, Chakri day, in a ceremony at the Ananta Samakhom Throne Hall. Prime Minister Prayut Chan-o-cha said that the office of King Vajiralongkorn had asked for several changes to clauses related to royal power in the draft constitution, a rare intervention by a reigning Thai monarch. After the death of King Bhumibol, political activity was paused during a period of mourning that ended in 2017.

In February 2019, in an unprecedented move, the King's elder sister, Ubol Ratana, announced her candidacy for the Thai prime ministership in the 2019 general election, running as a candidate of the Thaksin-allied Thai Raksa Chart Party. Later that same day, Vajiralongkorn issued a strongly worded statement, stating that her candidacy for prime minister is "inappropriate ... and unconstitutional". The Election Commission of Thailand then disqualified her from running for prime minister, formally putting an end to her candidacy. The Thai Raksa Chart Party was dissolved on 7 March 2019 by order of the Constitutional Court of Thailand and its political leaders were banned from politics for a decade.

Vajiralongkorn has direct control over the royal household and palace security agencies.

=== Coronation ===
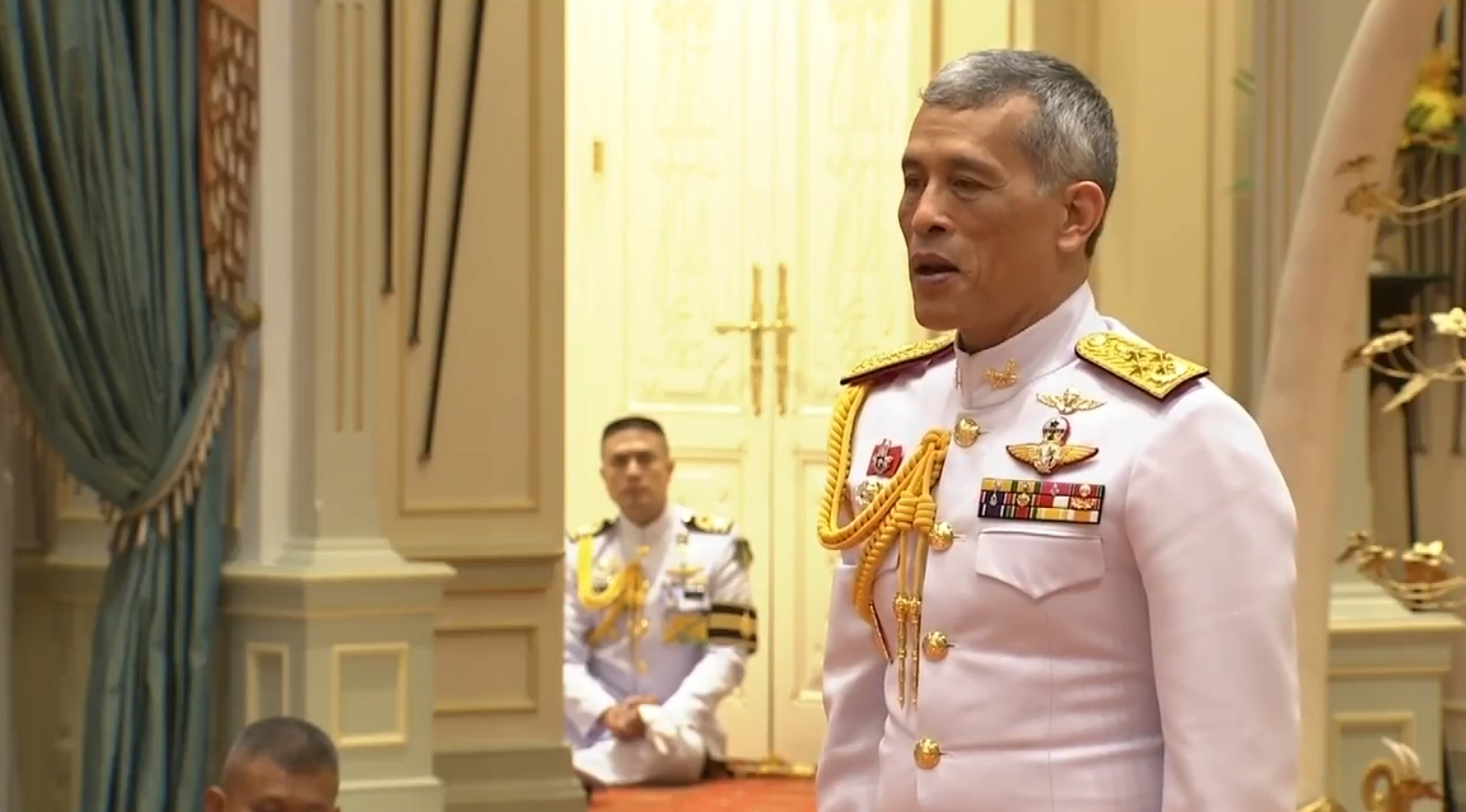
King Vajiralongkorn at Amphorn Sathan Residential Hall, Dusit Palace in 2018

In January 2019, the royal household announced that Vajiralongkorn's three-day coronation ceremonies would take place from 4 to 6 May 2019. The one billion baht (US$29.8 million) coronation was anticipated to attract 150,000 people to Sanam Luang, which it did.

=== Overseas trips ===
On 12 November 2025, Vajiralongkorn arrived in Beijing as part of the first visit by a Thai monarch to China.

=== Controversies ===
Vajiralongkorn's reign has been plagued by controversies unheard of during the reign of his predecessor. His image is affected by his reputation as a philanderer. In 2020, Thailand experienced widespread and unprecedented protests opposing his rule, which garnered significant attention both domestically and internationally.

King Vajiralongkorn reigning from the German state of Bavaria triggered anti-monarchy sentiments which contributed to protests across Thailand.

For most of 2020, Vajiralongkorn reportedly rented out the alpine Grand Hotel Sonnenbichl in Garmisch-Partenkirchen for himself and his entourage during the COVID-19 pandemic. He remained there during the nationwide protests and amidst a wave of anti-monarchy sentiments in Thailand, sparking controversy in both Thailand and Germany. German foreign minister Heiko Maas warned Vajiralongkorn not to govern from German soil. He also mentioned that the German government would be investigating his behavior during his stay in the country.

On 26 October 2020, protesters marched to the German Embassy in Bangkok, petitioning the German government to investigate Vajiralongkorn's activities in Germany for the possibility that he had been exercising powers from German soil.

== Personal life ==
Monarchs of the Chakri dynasty
- Phutthayotfa Chulalok (Rama I)
- Phutthaloetla Naphalai (Rama II)
- Nangklao (Rama III)
- Mongkut (Rama IV)
- Chulalongkorn (Rama V)
- Vajiravudh (Rama VI)
- Prajadhipok (Rama VII)
- Ananda Mahidol (Rama VIII)
- Bhumibol Adulyadej (Rama IX)
- Vajiralongkorn (Rama X)

=== Public image, the media, and the law ===
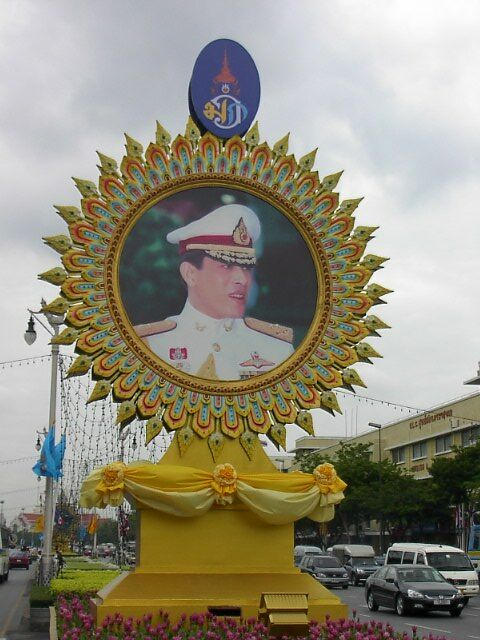
Portrait of Vajiralongkorn on Ratchadamnoen Avenue, 2006

Vajiralongkorn is protected by one of the most strictly enforced lèse majesté laws in the world. For many years, criticism of the king, queen, crown prince, and more recently, former kings, members of the royal family, and even their pets have been strictly prohibited. Violations carry large fines and prison sentences of up to 35 years. However, Vajiralongkorn's private life continues to be a controversial subject of discussion in Thailand, although not publicly. In the 10 January 2002 edition of the Far Eastern Economic Review (FEER), an article appeared suggesting that Vajiralongkorn had business ties with then-Prime Minister Thaksin Shinawatra. An immediate ban was placed on distribution of the magazine, and the Thai government, citing a threat to national security, suspended the visas of FEER's two Thailand correspondents, Shawn Crispin and Rodney Tasker.

In 2002, The Economist wrote that "Vajiralongkorn is held in much less esteem (than the then-king Bhumibol). Bangkok gossips like to swap tales of his lurid personal life ... Besides, no successor, however worthy, can hope to equal the stature King Bhumibol has attained after 64 years on the throne." This issue of The Economist was banned in Thailand. In 2010, another issue of The Economist, also not distributed in Thailand, said that Vajiralongkorn was "widely loathed and feared" and "unpredictable to the point of eccentricity", while the online journal Asia Sentinel said that he was "regarded as erratic and virtually incapable of ruling"; the journal was blocked shortly thereafter. In a leaked diplomatic cable, senior Singaporean foreign ministry official Bilahari Kausikan said that Vajiralongkorn had a gambling habit partly funded by exiled former prime minister Thaksin Shinawatra.

On 12 November 2009, a home video was released to WikiLeaks, showing Vajiralongkorn casually dressed and Princess Srirasmi Suwadee wearing only a G-string, all the while being attended to by several formally dressed servants, celebrating the birthday of the prince's poodle, Air Chief Marshal Fufu. Part of this video was broadcast on the programme Foreign Correspondent, on the Australian ABC channel on 13 April 2010, as part of a half-hour documentary critical of the royal family of Thailand.

On 19 January 2009, Harry Nicolaides, an Australian national, was sentenced to three years in prison for self-publishing a fictional book deemed to have violated lèse majesté. The offending passage alluded to rumours that "if the prince fell in love with one of his minor wives and she betrayed him, she and her family would disappear with their name, familial lineage and all vestiges of their existence expunged forever". Nicolaides was later pardoned by the king. Nicolaides later stated that "it's entirely fiction from cover to cover".

In August 2011, the German judicial authorities in Munich impounded a Boeing 737 aircraft, one of two belonging to Crown Prince Vajiralongkorn. Administrators seized the aircraft because of a 20-year-old Thai government debt owed to a now-defunct German construction corporation for the Don Mueang Tollway, that had risen to some €30 million. German authorities, representing the corporation's interests in bankruptcy, stated the measure was a "last resort" in seeking repayment. The Thai government, which had not responded to German demands, called the move "highly inappropriate". On 1 August, Vajiralongkorn's office announced he would pay the deposit amounting to €20 million himself.

In November 2016, Manager Magazin published a report stating that the new king could be issued with an inheritance tax bill in excess of €3.5 billion. According to the report, the new King is domiciled in Bavaria where he owns two villas which makes him subject to local inheritance tax. On 16 May 2017, Thai officials warned Facebook after an online video was posted of the king wearing a crop top and with full view of his half sleeve tattoo.

=== Marriages and issue ===
==== Soamsawali Kitiyakara ====
On 3 January 1977, Vajiralongkorn married Princess Soamsawali Kitiyakara (born 1957), a first cousin on his mother's side. They had one daughter, Princess Bajrakitiyabha, born in December 1978. Vajiralongkorn started living with actress Yuvadhida Polpraserth in the late 1970s and had five children with her. Although Soamsawali had refused divorce for many years, Vajiralongkorn was finally able to sue for divorce in the Family Court in January 1993. In the court proceedings, Vajiralongkorn accused Soamsawali of being completely at fault for the failed relationship. She was not able to refute the charges due to the prohibition against lèse majesté. The divorce was finalized in July 1993.

==== Yuvadhida Polpraserth ====
When Vajiralongkorn was introduced to Yuvadhida Polpraserth, she was an aspiring actress. She became his steady companion and gave birth to his first son, Prince Juthavachara Mahidol, on 29 August 1979. He later had three more sons and a daughter by her. They were married at a palace ceremony in February 1994, where they were blessed by the King and the Princess Mother, but not by the Queen. After the marriage, she was allowed to change her name to Mom Sujarinee Mahidol na Ayudhaya, signifying she was a commoner married to royalty. She was also commissioned as a major in the Royal Thai Army and took part in royal ceremonies with Vajiralongkorn. In 1996, two years after the wedding, Mom Sujarinee (as she was now known) decamped to Britain with all her children, while Vajiralongkorn caused posters to be placed all around his palace accusing her of committing adultery with Anand Rotsamkhan, a 60-year-old air marshal. Later, the prince abducted the daughter and brought her back to Thailand to live with him. She was later elevated to the rank of princess, whilst Sujarinee and her sons were stripped of their diplomatic passports and royal titles. Sujarinee and her sons moved to the United States, and as of 2007, she was known as Sujarinee Vivacharawongse. From his sons in America, Vajiralongkorn has three grandchildren.

==== Srirasmi Suwadee ====
Vajiralongkorn married for a third time on 10 February 2001, to Srirasmi Suwadee (royal name: Akharaphongpreecha), a commoner of modest background who had been in his service since 1992. The marriage was not disclosed to the public until early 2005. She gave birth to a son, Prince Dipangkorn Rasmijoti, on 29 April 2005 and was then elevated to the rank of princess. Her son was immediately elevated to the rank of prince. In a magazine interview shortly after that, Vajiralongkorn stated his intention to settle down.

In November 2014, however, Vajiralongkorn sent a letter to the interior ministry asking for Srirasmi's family to be stripped of the royal name Akharaphongpreecha awarded to her, following allegations of corruption against seven of her relatives. The following month, Srirasmi relinquished her royal titles and name and was officially divorced from Vajiralongkorn.

==== Suthida Tidjai ====
On 1 May 2019, three days before his coronation, Vajiralongkorn married Suthida Tidjai, former acting commander of Royal Thai Aide-de-Camp Department. Suthida was therefore made the queen consort of King Vajiralongkorn whose coronation took place in Bangkok on 4–6 May 2019. The marriage registration took place at the Amphorn Sathan Residential Hall in Bangkok, with his sister Princess Sirindhorn and President of Privy Council Prem Tinsulanonda as witnesses.

==== Niramon Ounprom ====
On 28 July 2019, Vajiralongkorn bestowed the title of "Chao Khun Phra" or Royal Noble Consort, and the royal name of Sineenat Wongvajirapakdi, on Major General Niramon Ounprom; the occasion marked the first official naming of a secondary consort for nearly a century. Three months later, on 21 October 2019, a palace order stripped Sineenat of her title and ranks, stating that she had been disrespectful to Queen Suthida and disloyal to the king. On 2 September 2020, Sineenat's titles were restored with a declaration that she "is not tarnished" and "Henceforth, it will be as if she had never been stripped of her military ranks or royal decorations."

==== Oranong Piyanat Wachiraphat ====
In 2026, Vajiralongkorn bestowed the title of "Chao Chom" or Concubine on Major General Oranong Piyanat Wachiraphat. Born on 8 September 1992, she was 33 years old at the time of her appointment. It was the first official appointment of a Thai royal consort under the title of "Chao Chom" in more than a century. She was subsequently known by the title Chao Chom, Lieutenant General, Than Phu Ying Oranong Piyanat Wachiraphat. She has represented Vajiralongkorn at religious and public ceremonies.

==== Children ====
Children of King Maha Vajiralongkorn Phra Vajira Klao Chao Yu Hua
Name	Relation	Birth	Death	Notes
By Soamsawali Kitiyakara (married 1977, divorced 1991)
Bajrakitiyabha, Princess Rajasarini Siribajra	Daughter	7 December 1978	11 June 2026 (aged 47)	
By Yuvadhida Polpraserth (married 1994, divorced 1996)
Juthavachara Vivacharawongse	Son	29 August 1979 (age 47)		born as Juthavachara Mahidol, married to Riya Gough, has issue
Vacharaesorn Vivacharawongse	Son	27 May 1981 (age 45)		born as Vacharaesorn Mahidol, married to Elisa Garafano, has issue
Chakriwat Vivacharawongse	Son	26 February 1983 (age 43)		born as Chakriwat Mahidol
Vatchrawee Vivacharawongse	Son	14 June 1985 (age 41)		born as Vatchrawee Mahidol
Princess Sirivannavari	Daughter	8 January 1987 (age 39)		born as Busyanambejra Mahidol
By Srirasmi Suwadee (married 2001, divorced 2014)
Prince Dipangkorn Rasmijoti	Son	29 April 2005 (age 21)		

== Honours ==
Styles of: King Vajiralongkorn; Rama X of Thailand
- Reference style: His Majesty
- Spoken style: Your Majesty

Royal Monogram of King Vajiralongkorn

as Crown Prince

as King

=== Military rank ===
- 2 July 1987: Major General, Rear Admiral and Air Vice-Marshal
- 1 October 1988: Lieutenant General, Vice Admiral and Air marshal
- 9 January 1992: General, Admiral and Air Chief Marshal
- 3 December 2024: Field Marshal

=== Volunteer Defense Corps of Thailand rank ===
- Volunteer Defense Corps General

=== Foreign decorations ===
- Denmark: Knight of the Order of the Elephant (7 February 2001)
- France: Grand Cross of the National Order of the Legion of Honour (29 June 2026)
- Malaysia: Honorary Grand Commander of the Most Esteemed Order of the Defender of the Realm (2 September 2013)
- Nepal: Member of the Most Glorious Order of the Benevolent Ruler (12 December 1984).
- North Korea: First Class of the Order of the National Flag (10 March 1992)
- Peru: Grand Cross of the Order of the Sun of Peru (9 April 1993)
- Portugal: Grand Cross of the Military Order of Aviz (31 December 1981)
- Spain: Knight Grand Cross of the Order of Charles III (13 November 1987)
- Sweden: Member Grand Cross of the Royal Order of the Seraphim (25 February 2003)
- West Germany: Grand Cross with Special Class of the Order of Merit of the Federal Republic of Germany (29 February 1984)

=== Wear of orders, decorations, and medals ===
The ribbons worn regularly by Vajiralongkorn in undress uniform are as follows :

== Ancestry ==
Ancestors of Vajiralongkorn

8. Chulalongkorn, Rama V
4. Mahidol Adulyadej
9. Savang Vadhana
2. Bhumibol Adulyadej, Rama IX
10. Chu Chukramol
5. Srinagarindra
11. Kham Chukramol
1.Vajiralongkorn, Rama X
12. Kitiyakara Voralaksana, 1st Prince of Chanthaburi
6. Nakkhatra Mangala
13. Princess Apsarasaman Devakula
3. Queen Sirikit
14. Sathan Snidvongs
7. Bua Kitiyakara
15. Bang Snidvongs

== Notes ==
Vajiralongkorn (Rama X) House of Mahidol Cadet branch of the House of Chakri Born: 28 July 1952
Regnal titles
Preceded by Bhumibol Adulyadej	King of Thailand; 13 October 2016 – present	Incumbent; Heir presumptive: Dipangkorn Rasmijoti
Thai royalty
Vacant Title last held by Vajiravudh	Crown Prince of Thailand; 28 December 1972 – 13 October 2016	Vacant
Order of precedence
First	Thai order of precedence The Sovereign; 1st position	Succeeded by The Queen
