= On-anong Piyanatavajirabaddha =

Chao Chom Lieutenant General Than Phu Ying On-anong Piyanatavajirabaddha
- Born: On-anong Suwannasri; 8 September 1992 (age 34); Thawat Buri district, Roi Et province, Thailand
- Residence: Rajarittirungroj Residence, Dusit Palace, Bangkok, Thailand
- Spouse: King Rama X
- Father: Damrong Soraphoom
- Mother: Khun Ying Nupian Soraphoom
- Military career
- Allegiance: Thailand
- 2014–present: 2014–present
- Rank: Lieutenant General
- Units: King's Close Bodyguard Command, Royal Security Command

On-anong Piyanatavajirabaddha (Thai: อรอนงค์ ปิยนาฏวชิรพัทธ์, also spelt as On-anong Piyanatwachiraphat or Onanong Piyanatwachiraphat) is a Thai military officer who has been the Royal concubine of the Thai monarch in 2026, as the consort of King Rama X of Thailand. She holds the rank of lieutenant general and is a special royal guard officer. She has represented King Vajiralongkorn at official and religious ceremonies. The title of Chao Chom ranks below Chao Khun Phra (เจ้าคุณพระ, royal noble), the title currently held by Sineenatha.

== Early life and education ==
Onanong was born on 8 September 1992 in Ban Fang Daeng, Um Mao subdistrict, Thawat Buri district, Roi Et province. She is the daughter of Khun Ying Nupian Soraphum. She attended Chonburi Sports School and later studied physical education at the Thailand National Sports University in Chonburi. In 2026, the university honored her as an outstanding alumna.

Her original name was Onanong Suwannasri. She later received the royal names Sirivajiraphak and then Piyanatwachiraphat from King Vajiralongkorn. According to journalist Andrew MacGregor Marshall, in August 2024, her mother accompanied government officials and military officers during visits around Roi Et province, where royal gift boxes containing diaries and Buddhist educational materials were distributed.

== Military career ==
Onanong began her military career under the name Onanong Sirivajiraphak. According to the Royal Gazette, she became a lieutenant on 24 June 2016.

She was promoted to major in February 2021 and to colonel in June 2023.

On 27 July 2024, she was appointed a special royal guard officer with the rank of major general at the age of 31. She was one of five female officers appointed to the position.

By 2026, she held the rank of lieutenant general.

== Chao Chom title ==
In April 2026, she was given the royal title of Chao Chom and first used the title while representing King Vajiralongkorn at religious ceremonies in Roi Et province. She was the first person to hold the title during King Vajiralongkorn's reign. The title had not been used since the reign of King Vajiravudh (Rama VI), when Chao Chom Suvatthana Abhayawong held it before later becoming Queen Suvatthana.

After receiving the title, she has represented King Vajiralongkorn at religious and public ceremonies.

== Royal duties ==
On 12 April 2026, she represented the king at the Bun Phawet festival at Wat Fang Daeng in Thawat Buri district and at a royal Songkran water-pouring ceremony at Wat Tha Sabaeng in Thung Khao Luang district, Roi Et province.

On 6 May 2026, she represented the king at the consecration ceremony of Phra Buddha Piyanat Wachiraphat at Wat Pathom Wanaram in Pathum Thani province.

In 2025, she also represented the King at the opening of the World Heritage, the World of Dharma project at Wat Worachettharam in Ayutthaya.

In 2026, she was chairperson of the advisory committee of the Sports Promotion for National Development Project under Royal Patronage. On 19 August 2026, she presided over the closing ceremony of the Thai Domestic Power – Kids' Athletics 2026 national championship.

On 8 September 2026, she accompanied King Vajiralongkorn at Wat Ratchapradit Sthit Maha Simaram in Bangkok, where he performed Buddhist religious ceremonies and offered food and alms to monks.

== Phra Buddha Piyanat Wachiraphat ==
Phra Buddha Piyanat Wachiraphat (พระพุทธปิยนาฏวชิรพัทธ์) is a Buddha image created named after her. It is about 8 meters long and is in a posture associated with the subduing of Rahu. The image was designed by the Ten Craftsmen Division of the Fine Arts Department and is intended for Wat Pathom Wanaram in Pathum Thani province. The casting ceremony was held on 8 September 2025, which was Onanong's 33rd birthday. On 6 May 2026, she represented the king at the ceremony to consecrate the image.

== Title, styles, honours and awards ==
=== Styles and symbols ===
Styles of Onanong Piyanat Wachiraphat
- Reference style: Than Chao Chom, Than Phu Ying

=== Awards and honours ===
- 2024: Knight Grand Commander (Second Class, Special) of the Order of Chula Chom Klao.
- 2025: Knight Grand Cordon (Special Class) of the Order of the White Elephant (M.P.Ch.).
- 2025: Knight Grand Cordon (Special Class) of the Most Noble Order of the Crown of Thailand (M.V.M.).
- 2025: Royal Decoration of King Rama X, 1st Class (W.P.R.1).
- 2025: Gold Rajaruchi Medal, Rama X class (R.J.T.10).

=== Military rank ===
- 24 June 2016: Second Lieutenant
- 26 January 2021: Major
- 30 March 2022: Lieutenant Colonel
- 22 June 2023: Colonel
- 27 July 2024: Major General
- 2026: Lieutenant General
