= Broom's Barn Experimental Station =

Research institute in Suffolk, England

- Location within Suffolk
- Former names: Broom's Barn Research Station

General information
- Type: Horticultural Research Centre
- Location: Suffolk, IP28 6NP
- Coordinates: 52.2613°N 0.5671°E
- Elevation: 70 m (230 ft)
- Completed: 1962
- Inaugurated: 1962

Dimensions
- Other dimensions: 77 hectares

Broom's Barn Experimental Station is a Rothamsted Research institute and arable farm in Suffolk, United Kingdom. The current farm manager is Mark Gardner.

== History ==
=== Lincolnshire ===
In October 1959 the Broom's Barn site, of 190 acres, was acquired by the Rothamsted Experimental Station, with money provided by the Sugar Beet Research and Education Committee. Research had been taking place, previously, at the Dunholme Field Station, near Dunholme Holt, in Lincolnshire since 1935.

The buildings in Lincolnshire were not sufficient. The plant pathologist Raymond Hull had run the Dunholme site from 1949. Dunholme was run by Rothamsted.

=== Suffolk ===
In December 1959 it acquired planning from Thingoe Rural District in West Suffolk (county).

The first sugar beet was sown by April 1961, but full operation would not be until 1962.

It was officially opened on Friday July 27 1962 by Christopher Soames. It had cost around £250,000.

In the 1940s 500,000 tons of sugar were produced. By the 1960s, it was 800,000 tons.

On Friday 13 May 1966, it was visited by the West German ambassador Herr Herbert Blankenhorn.

It merged in 1987 to become part of the Institute of Arable Crops Research. The funding for the site came from the Sugar Beet Research and Education Committee, which became the British Beet Research Organisation (BBRO). The research which was being carried out was shut down by the director of the station and science staff left the site. Brooms Barn remains a fully functionally arable farm and LSRE station.

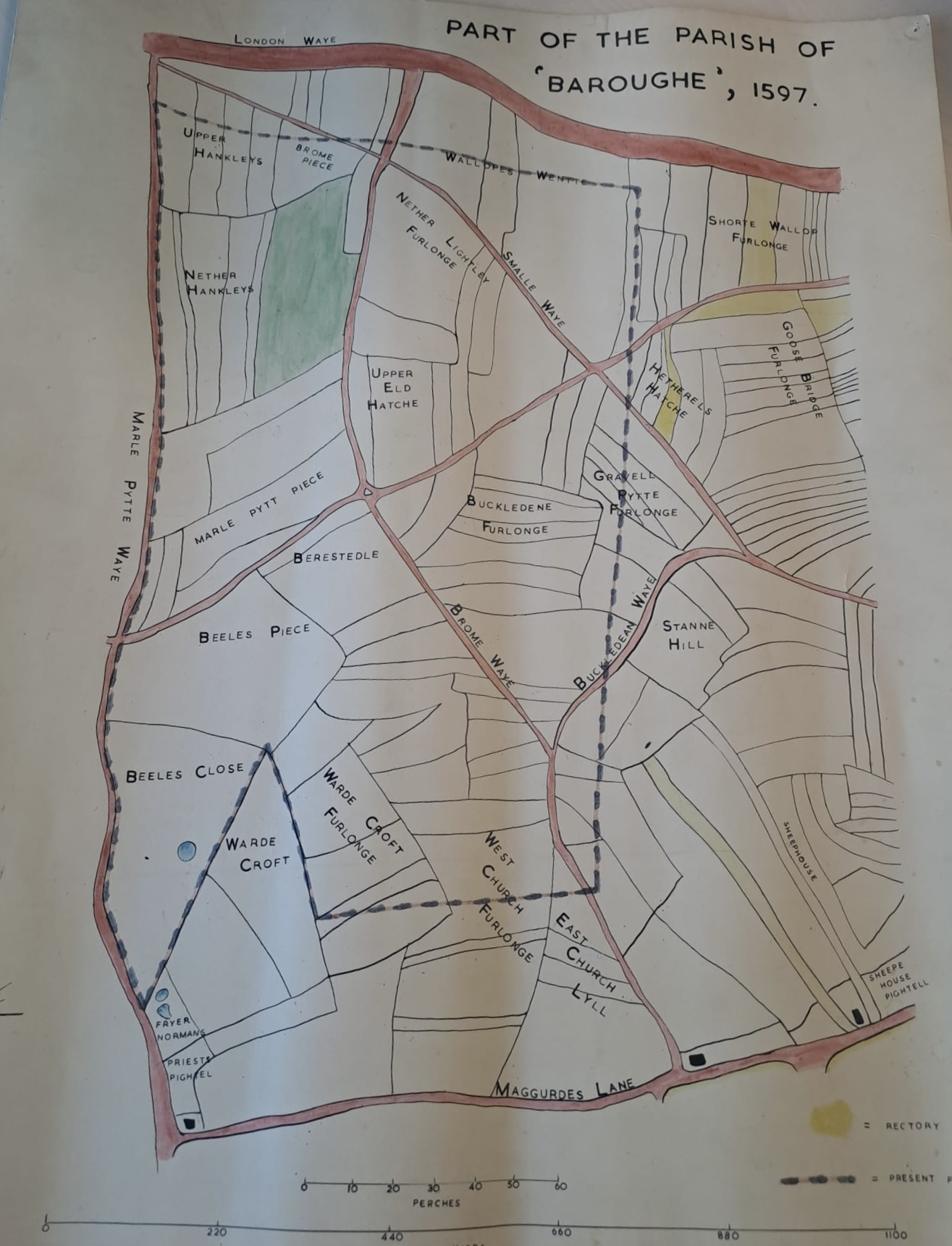
The aerial representation of Brooms and surrounding land from 1597 is of the time. Note how there are roads going through what would be fields today. The dotted/dashed line represents where Brooms Barn Farm would be today, some names have been kept from fields, note the spelling of 'Baroughe'.

== Funding ==
In 1989, for every tonne of sugar beet, 9p went to Broom's Barn.

== Directors ==
- 1962 Raymond Hull, he died aged 85 on August 26 1996 in Little Saxham
- 1977 Keith Scott
- Peter Longden, who researched weeds

== Structure ==
It is situated just south of the A14. In the early 2000s, the site employed around 70 people. It researched sugar beet. Until 1967, the Higham railway station served the site.

== Research ==
Beet necrotic yellow vein virus, known as virus yellow, was looked at, which leads to the disease rhizomania. It worked with NIAB in Cambridge and the British Crop Production Council.

It carried out entomological research into sugar beet pests.

Other sugar beet research took place at Lexham Hall in Norfolk.

In late 1999 it conducted research into genetic modification.

== See also ==
- Timeline of plant pathology
