= Higham railway station (Suffolk) =

Former railway station in England

Coordinates: 52.2652°N 0.5583°E

Higham
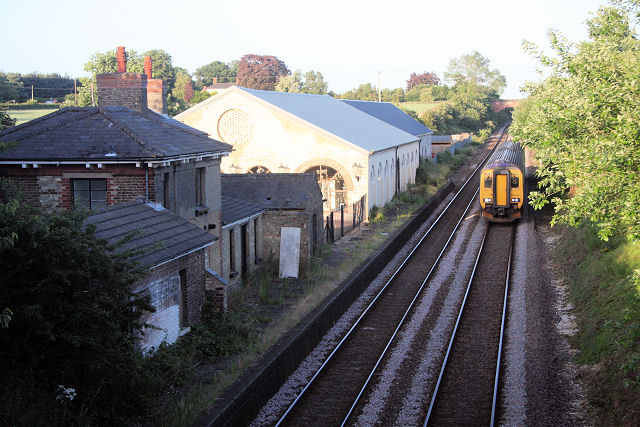

General information
- Location: Higham, West Suffolk; England
- Platforms: 2

Other information
- Status: Disused

History
- Original company: Great Eastern Railway

Key dates
- 1 Apr 1854: Opened
- 28 Dec 1964: Closed to goods
- 2 Jan 1967: Closed to passengers
Location

Higham railway station was a station serving Higham in the English county of Suffolk. It was opened by the Great Eastern Railway in 1854 when the railway was extended from Newmarket to Bury St Edmunds. From 1929 onwards the four station staff were replaced by a 'Porter-in-charge' until the station's closure by British Railways in 1967.

== History ==
Higham station was unique on the line for having an exceptionally large goods shed which dealt with a heavy agricultural traffic in the early twentieth century until goods traffic was withdrawn in 1964. The station also dealt with traffic from the nearby Rothamsted Research Broom's Barn research institute.

According to the Official Handbook of Stations the following classes of traffic were being handled at this station in 1956: G, P, F, L, H, C and there was a 1-ton 10 cwt crane.

Preceding station	Historical railways	Following station
Saxham and Risby; Line open, station closed	Great Eastern Railway; Ipswich-Cambridge/Peterborough	Kennett; Line and station open

== Present day ==
Following the station's closure, the station building and goods shed were sold off and the track layout rationalised, resulting in the removal of the south platform and the closure of the signal box in 1970.

Today, the station and a new commercial building siting behind the plot of the old goods shed is in private ownership and used for commercial purposes. The goods shed caught fire in 2016 and unfortunately had to be pulled down prior which it served as a lighting showroom.. The station building is the sole remaining example dating from the extension of the Newmarket line - identical buildings at Saxham and Risby railway station and Kennett railway station have since been demolished.

On 10 September 2016, the goods shed caught fire, closing the line, and was demolished the next day due to the risk of the building collapsing on to the line.
