= Royal Security Command =

Thai royal protection command

- หน่วยบัญชาการถวายความปลอดภัยรักษาพระองค์

Department overview
- Formed: 9 January 1992; 34 years ago
- Jurisdiction: Thailand
- Headquarters: Thawi Watthana Palace, Bangkok, Thailand
- Department executives: Vajiralongkorn, Commander; Suthida, Deputy Commander; General Jakraphop Bhuridej, Deputy Commander, King’s Bodyguard Commander
- Website: www.royaloffice.th/en/about-royal-office/royal-security/

The Royal Security Command (Thai: หน่วยบัญชาการถวายความปลอดภัยรักษาพระองค์) is the king of Thailand's military household and is part of Thailand's royal court administration. It exercises command and control over the military units that are engaged full-time in the protection and guarding of the king and his family as well as the various Royal palaces of Thailand.

The command is responsible for the planning, direction and coordination of the security detachments of the king, queen, heir-apparent and other members of the Thai royal family. It is also responsible for the security of the monarch's representatives (privy counselors, palace officials, etc.) as well as guests (foreign leaders) of the King. The security and safety of the king, his family and Royal palaces are under the direct authority of the Monarch. The units and personnel of the royal security command do not form part of the regular armed forces chain of command when engaged in royal security assignments.

== History ==
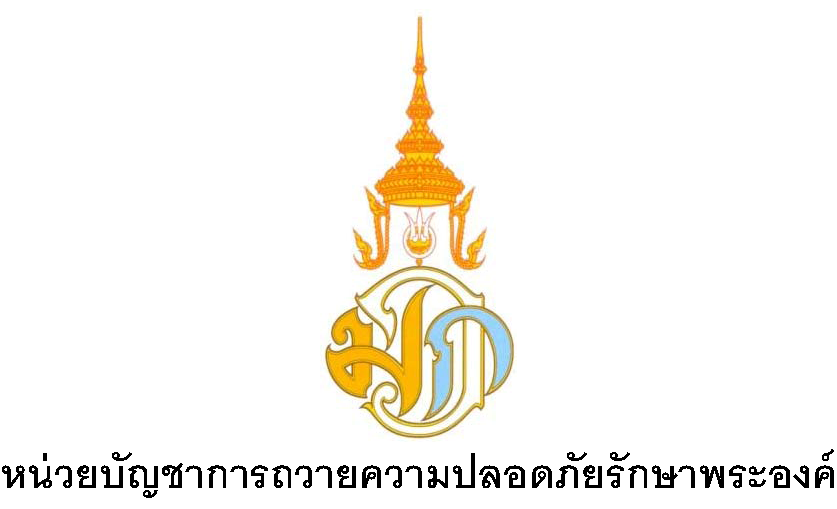
Symbol of the Royal Security Command (2014–2016)

The Royal Security Command was formerly an agency under the Office of the Supreme Commander of the Royal Thai Armed Forces Headquarters. It was established as a King's Guard unit on 18 November 1992. In 2013, the Royal Security Command became a juristic person and was put under the purview of the Ministry of Defense while retaining Crown Prince Vajiralongkorn as its commander.

On 1 May 2017 the Royal Security Command was removed from the defense ministry and made an independent royal agency directly under the authority of the King, independent of the rest of the armed forces and the Royal Thai Government.

On 30 September 2019, two infantry regiments were removed from the Royal Thai Army's chain of command and placed under the Royal Security Command. All personnel, assets and operating budgets were likewise transferred to the agency. The move was prompted by the need to provide better security to the royal family, royal residences, and Foreign heads of state and other dignitaries visiting at the monarch's invitation.

== Organization ==
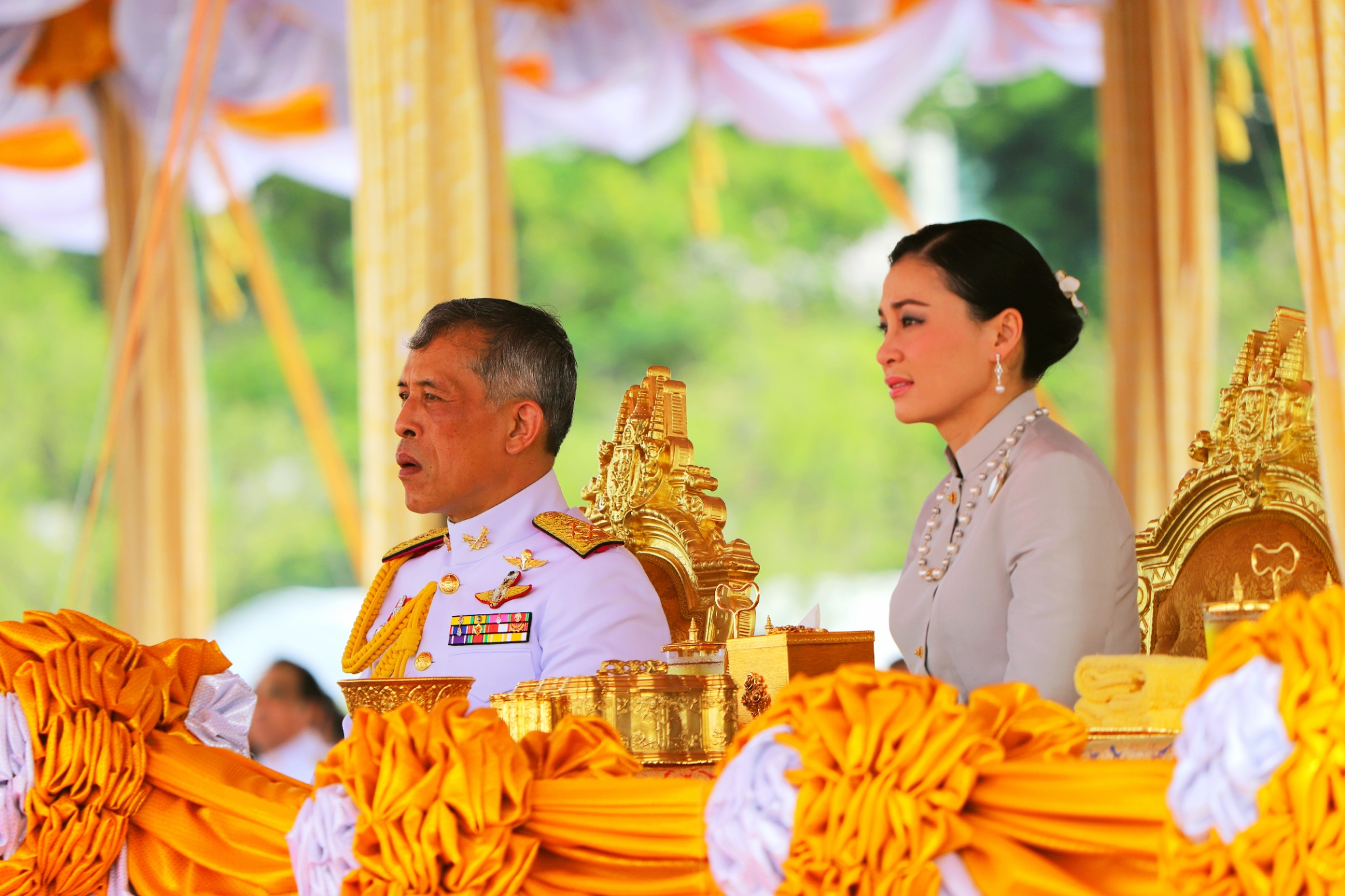
King Vajiralongkorn and Queen Suthida are the commander and deputy commander of the unit.

The Royal Security Command is divided into these agencies:

- Office of the Commander (This officer is appointed by and directly responsible to the king)
- Office of the Royal Duty Officers
- Office of the Aide-de-Camp
- The King's Close Bodyguard Command (All infantry units from the Royal Thai Army are under this section of the command)
- Office of the Royal Police Guards (This section exercises control over police units assigned to the command)

=== Military units ===
The King”s Close Bodyguard Command is in charge of two Infantry regiments:

- 1st Infantry Regiment, King's Close Bodyguard (Thai: มหาดเล็กราชวัลลภ; RTGS: mahat lek ratcha wanlop), 'The king's close bodyguards')
  - 1st Infantry Battalion, 1st King's Own Bodyguard Regiment
  - 2nd Infantry Battalion, 1st King's Own Bodyguard Regiment
  - 3rd Infantry Battalion, 1st King's Own Bodyguard Regiment
- 11th Infantry Regiment, King's Close Bodyguard, (Thai: ทหารล้อมวัง; RTGS: thahan lom wang), 'The palace bodyguards')
  - 1st Infantry Battalion, 11th King's Own Bodyguard Regiment
  - 2nd Infantry Battalion, 11th King's Own Bodyguard Regiment
  - 3rd Infantry Battalion, 11th King's Own Bodyguard Regiment

=== Police units ===
- Royal Police Guards

== See also ==
- Head of the Royal Thai Armed Forces
- King's Guard (Thailand)
- Praetorianism
