= Royal Guards March =

March composed by Bhumibol Adulyadej

Mat Ratchawanlop
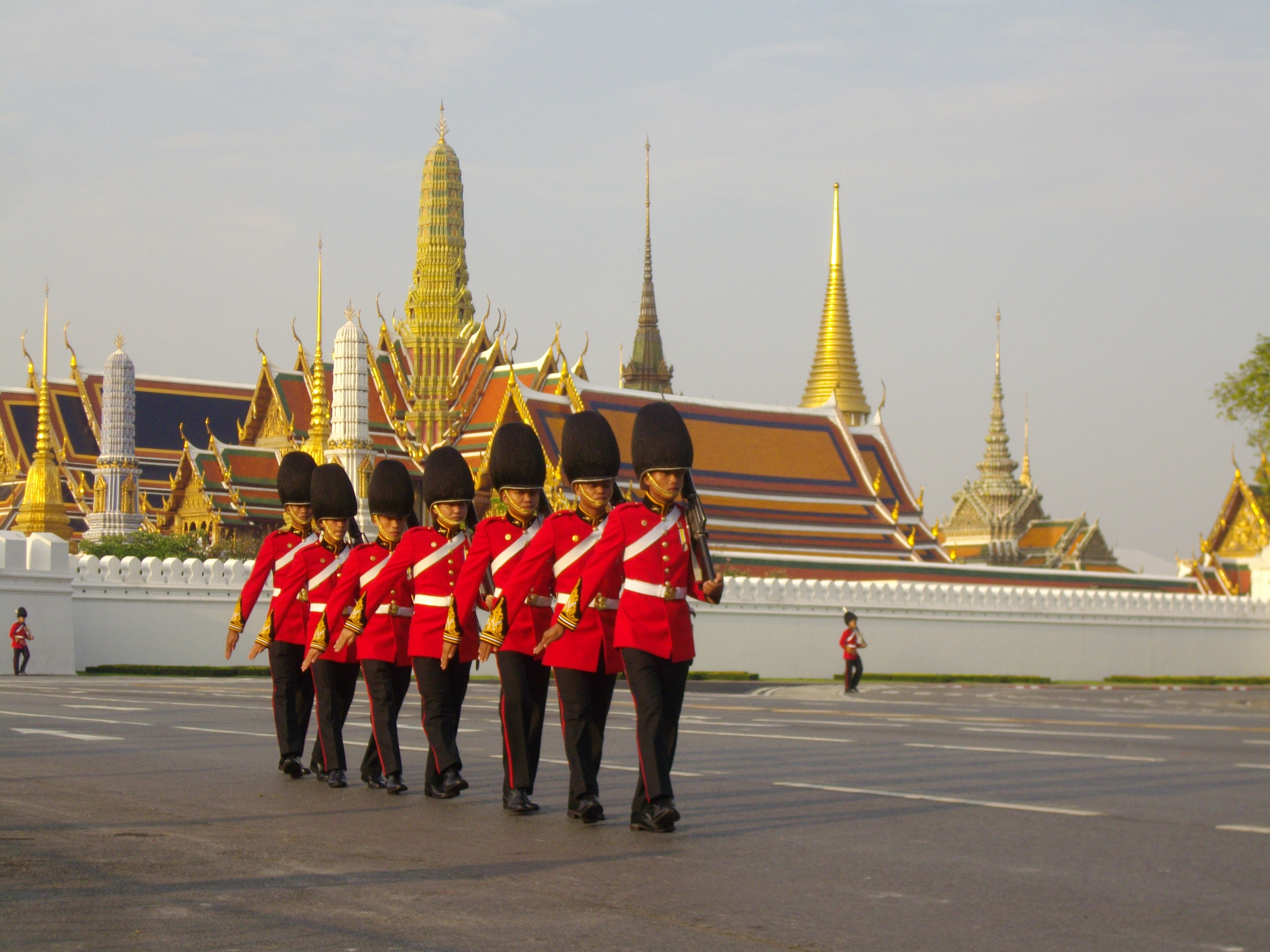
- King's Guard marching in front of Wat Phra Kaew.
- English: Royal Guards March
- Native name: มาร์ชราชวัลลภ
- Year: 1952
- Genre: March
- Text: by Sipho Thasanut
- Language: Thai
- Melody: by King Bhumibol Adulyadej

"Royal Guards March" (Thai: มาร์ชราชวัลลภ; RTGS: [March] Ratchawanlop) is the march of the King's Guard of Thailand. The music was originally composed by King Bhumibol Adulyadej in 1948 called "Ratchawanlop". The lyrics were later composed by Major General Sipho Thasanut (ศรีโพธิ์ ทศนุต) and were edited by Phra Chenduriyang. Bhumibol gave the lyricised song the name "March Ratchawanlop" in 1952.

== Lyrics ==
Thai lyrics:
เราทหารราชวัลลภรักษาองค์
พระมหากษัตริย์สูงส่ง ล้วนแต่องอาจแข็งแรง
เราทุกคนบูชากล้าหาญวินัย เทิดเกียรติชาติไว้ทุกแห่ง
ใจดุจเหล็กเพชรแข็งแกร่ง มิกลัวใคร

เราเป็นกองทหารประวัติการณ์ก่อเกิด กำเนิดกองทัพบกชาติไทย
เราทุกคนภูมิใจได้รับ ไว้วางพระราชหฤทัย
พิทักษ์สมเด็จเจ้าไทย ตลอดในพระวงศ์จักรีฯ

เราทหารราชวัลลภรักษาองค์ฯ
จะถวายสัตย์ซื่อตรง องค์ราชาราชินี
ถ้าแม้นมีภัยพาลอวดหาญ มิเกรง ดูหมิ่น ข่มเหง ย่ำยี
เราจะถวายชีวี มิหวาดหวั่น
จะลุยเลือดสู้ตาย จะเอากายป้องกัน เป็นเกราะทองรบประจัญศัตรู
ฝากฝีมือปรากฏ เกียรติยศฟุ้งเฟื่อง กระเดื่องกองทัพบกไทย
ไว้นามเชิดชูราชวัลลภคู่ปฐพี

English translation:
We, the Royal Guards, protectors of the King,
Serving the noble Monarch, all brave and strong.
We revere courage and uphold discipline, honoring the nation everywhere.
With hearts of steel and diamond strength, we fear no one.

We are a historic corps, the origin and foundation of the Royal Thai Army.
We are proud to receive the royal trust,
to safeguard the Thai Sovereign and the entire Chakri Dynasty.

We are the Royal Guards, protectors of the King,
Pledge our loyalty and devotion to the King and the Queen.
If arrogant enemies dare threaten, showing contempt and oppression,
We shall offer our lives without fear.

We will charge through blood and battle to the death, using our bodies as shields, golden armor confronting the foe.
Let our deeds be renowned, our honor resounding throughout the Royal Thai Army,
So that the name of the Royal Guards shall be glorified across the land!
