= Timeline of plant pathology =

Chronological listing of events of importance

Plant pathology has developed from antiquity, but scientific study began in the Early modern period and developed in the 19th century.

== Early history ==
- 300–286 BC; Theophrastus, father of botany, wrote and studied diseases of trees, cereals and legumes

== 17th century ==
- 1665; Robert Hooke illustrates a plant-pathogenic fungal disease, rose rust
- 1675; Antony van Leeuwenhoek invents the compound microscope, in 1683 describes bacteria seen with the microscope

== 18th century ==
- 1729; Pier Antonio Micheli observes fungal spores, conducts germination experiments
- 1755; Mathieu Tillet reports on treatment of seeds
- 1767; Felice Fontana and Giovanni Targioni Tozzetti show that stem rust is caused by the fungus Puccinia graminis

== 19th century ==
- 1802; Lime sulfur first used to control plant disease
- 1845–1849; Potato late blight epidemic in Ireland
- 1853; Heinrich Anton de Bary, father of modern mycology, establishes that fungi are the cause, not the result, of plant diseases, publishes "Untersuchungen uber die Brandpilze"
- 1858; Julius Kühn publishes "Die Krankheiten der Kultergewachse"
- 1865; M. Planchon discovers a new species of Phylloxera, which was named Phylloxera vastatrix.
- 1868–1882; Coffee rust epidemic in Sri Lanka
- 1871; Thomas Taylor publishes the first USDA papers on microscopic plant pathogens
- 1875; Mikhail Woronin identified the cause of clubroot as a "plasmodiophorous organism" and gave it the name Plasmodiophora brassicae
- 1876; Fusarium oxysporum f.sp. cubense, responsible for Panama disease, discovered in bananas in Australia
- 1878–1885; Downy mildew of grape epidemic in France
- 1879; Robert Koch establishes germ theory: diseases are caused by microorganisms
- 1882; Lehrbuch der Baumkrankheiten (Textbook of Diseases of Trees), by Robert Hartig, is published in Berlin, the first textbook of forest pathology.
- 1885; Bordeaux mixture introduced by Pierre-Marie-Alexis Millardet to control downy mildew on grape
- 1885; Experimental proof that bacteria can cause plant diseases: Erwinia amylovora and fire blight of apple
- 1886–1898; Recognition of plant viral diseases: Tobacco mosaic virus
- 1889; Introduction of hot water treatment of seed for disease control by J. L. Jensen

== 20th century ==
- 1902; First chair of plant pathology established, in Copenhagen
- 1904; Mendelian inheritance of cereal rust resistance demonstrated
- 1907; First academic department of plant pathology established at Cornell University
- 1908; American Phytopathological Society founded
- 1910; Panama disease reaches Western Hemisphere
- 1911; Scientific journal Phytopathology founded
- 1923; Lawrence Ogilvie identified the virus that had devastated Bermuda's high-value lily bulb crops.
- 1925; Panama disease reaches every banana-growing country in the Western Hemisphere
- 1951; European and Mediterranean Plant Protection Organization (EPPO) founded
- 1967; Recognition of plant pathogenic mycoplasma-like organisms
- 1971; Theodor Otto Diener discovers viroids, organisms smaller than viruses
