= Weerasak Khobkhet =

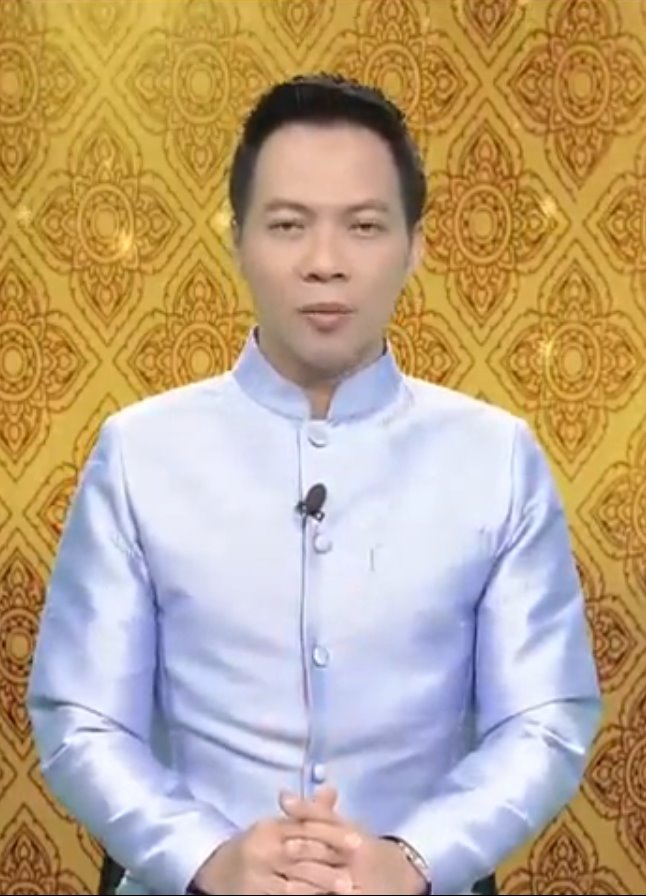
- Born: October 10, 1973 (age 52); Khon Kaen province Thailand
- Other name: Pong (ป๋อง)
- Occupation: News presenter
- Organization: National Broadcasting Services of Thailand
- Known for: The news announcer reported the Death of Bhumibol Adulyadej, Death of Sirikit and Death of Bajrakitiyabha.
- Notable work: Royal News

Weerasak Khobkhet (born October 10, 1973) is a Thai news anchor who currently reads royal news on the National Broadcasting Services of Thailand (NBT) and is known for announcing the Death of Bhumibol Adulyadej Death of Sirikit and Death of Bajrakitiyabha.

== Biography ==
Weerasak was born on 10 October 1973 in Khon Kaen province. He completed his secondary education at Khon Kaen Wittayayon School, earned a bachelor's degree from the Faculty of Humanities and Social Sciences at Khon Kaen University, and a master's degree in political science from the Faculty of Social Sciences at Kasetsart University.

== Career ==
Weerasak has worked as a news anchor since 1994, initially serving as a social and education reporter at Channel 7 before moving to Channel 9, where he worked as an agricultural reporter and youth news anchor. He later left the industry for a period to work as a flight attendant for Thai Airways before returning to news anchoring at the National Broadcasting Services of Thailand in 2006, where he has remained since.

== Personal life ==
Weerasak Khobkhet was known for his loyalty to Bhumibol Adulyadej and was reported to have shed tears during the broadcast announcing his death. Despite this, many viewers praised his professionalism during the announcement.
