= Tattoo Colour =

Thai pop-rock band

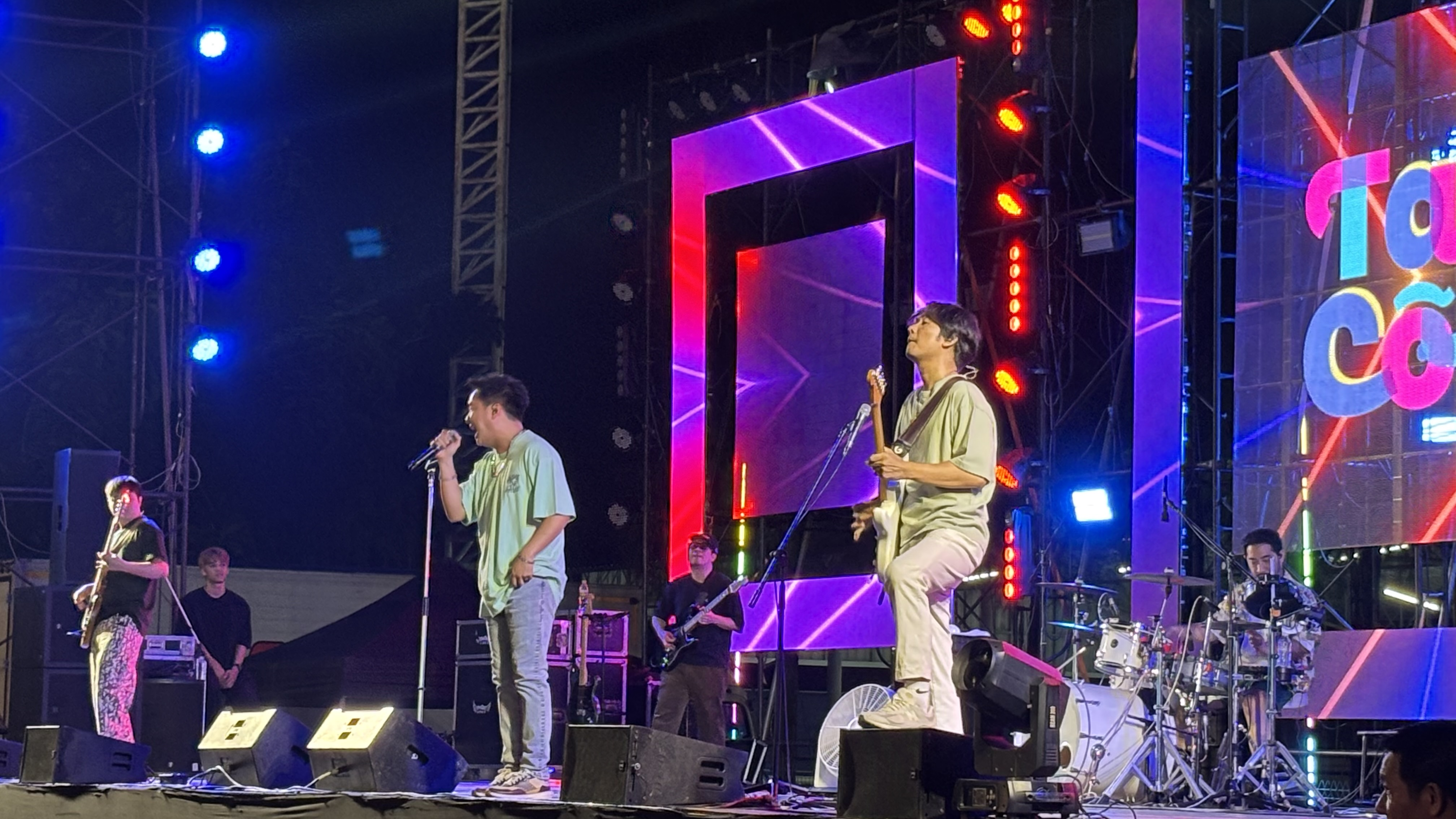

Background information
- Origin: Khon Kaen, Thailand
- Genres: Pop; rock; funk; soul
- Years active: 2006–present
- Label: Smallroom
- Members: Harin Suthamjaras (Dim); Ruzz Pikatpairee; Ekachai Chotirungrot (Tonk); Thanabordee Theerapongpakdee (Jump)

Tattoo Colour is a Thai indie pop band, consisting of vocalist Harin Suthamjaras (Dim), guitarist Ruzz Pikatpairee (Ruzz), drummer Ekachai Chotirungrot (Tonk), and bassist Thanabordee Theerapongpakdee (Jump).

== History ==
The four members studied at Khon Kaen Wittayayon School. There, they and other two members formed the band I-SCREAM 479 with one full album being primarily sold in the school. Upon graduation, the band members dispersed to continue their studies.

Vocalist Harin, guitarist Ruzz and drummer Ekachai continued their higher education at Khon Kaen University. They teamed up to create music in an attempt to win a music contest organized by a top-up mobile SIM card brand Happy, with music label Smallroom as the judge. They won first place in the contest, and signed their first contract with Smallroom in 2003 to form a new band called Tattoo Colour. Thanabodee was invited the band’s bassist later in 2004.

Their first album Hong Ser was released in 2006, with singles Fah and Fak Tee a success. As a result, they released more singles such as Koh Rang Hang Rak, One Night Stand and Roi Joob.

In 2008, the group released their second album Chut Thi 8: Jong Proh, following its predecessor with the same pop rock and indie rock genres. The first single Kha Moo was followed by Jam Tham Mai, the latter of which was a massive success receiving critical acclaim. The popularity led to their first full-scale concert Kan La Khrang Nueng: Tattoo Ma Laeo! (lit. Once Upon A Time: Tattoo Has Come!)

The albums Trong Naeo Trong Naeo, Pop Dad, and Sat Jing were released in 2010, 2014 and 2017 respectively.

Tattoo Colour's popularity significantly increased again in 2022, primarily due to their acclaimed live performance with Thailand Philharmonic Orchestra in 2018, released in 2022. This surge was further bolstered by the band's active use of social media, including their YouTube channel to engage with new fans during the COVID-19 pandemic.

Their popularity led to success on their new album Ruean Phae Chut Thi 6, released in 2022, followed by the concerts Kan La Khrang 4: Happy Birthday (lit. 4th Time Upon A Time: Happy Birthday) in 2022, and Kan La Khrang 5: Tattoo Colour Fest. (lit. 5th Time Upon A Time: Tattoo Colour Fest) in 2024 at Impact Arena.

In 2024, Tattoo Colour won "Best Band of the Year" at Guitar Mag Awards.

== Members ==
- Harin Suthamjaras (Dim) – Main vocals, chorus
- Ruzz Pikatpairee (Ruzz) – Guitar, main vocals, chorus
- Ekachai Chotirungrot (Tonk) – Drums, chorus
- Thanabordee Theerapongpakdee (Jump) – Bass, chorus

== Discography ==
=== Studio albums ===
- Hong Ser (2006)
- Chut Thi 8: Jong Proh (2008)
- Trong Naeo Trong Naeo (2010)
- Pop Dad (2014)
- Sat Jing (2017)
- Ruean Phae Chut Thi 6 (2022)
- Fitness Pop (2026)

=== Special albums and EPs ===
- The Rest of the Songs from Pop Dad (Live) (2017) – live session of five songs from Pop Dad.
- Tattoo Colour X TPO (Live at Prince Mahidol Hall) (2022) – live rearranged session collaborated with Thailand Philharmonic Orchestra, performed at Prince Mahidol Hall in 2018.
- My Secret Folder (2022) – collection of eight demos.
- Bao Dai Bao (2024) – acoustic rearrangements.

== Tattoo Colour TV ==
Tattoo Colour also has their own YouTube channel titled Tattoo Colour TV, created in 2009. It initially featured behind-the-scenes of the working process of each album. In 2021, the band decided to upload contents with more variety to reach new audiences.

The channel reached 100,000 subscribers on May 5, 2022. In the celebration video, Ruzz used the silver play button to open a crown-cap bottle.

Tattoo Colour surpassed 200,000 and 300,000 subscribers on TCTV on October 6, 2022 and July 23, 2024 respectively.

== Concerts ==
- Karn La Krang 1 Tattoo Ma Law (2008)
- Karn La Krang 2 Tattoo Cunverrrr Concerts (2012)
- Karn La Krang 3 Pop Dad Concert (2014)
- Karn La Krang 4 Happy Birthday (2022)
- Karn La Krang 5 Tattoo Colour Fest. (2024)
- Karn La Krang 6 Tattoo Stadium (2026)

== Awards ==
- The longest-running chart song "Fah" Virgin Hitz Awards 2007
- The hottest duo and band from Seed Awards 2008
- The most popular band from Star Entertainment Awards 2008
- The most popular band from Siamdara Star Awards 2008
- The most popular indie from POP Music Awards 2009
- The most popular album "Chood Tee 8 Jong Pror" from Fat Awards 2009
- The duo and band of the year from Fat Awards 2009
- The Best Band of the year from The Guitar Mag Award 2011
- The Best Guitarist of the year from The Guitar Mag Award 2015
- The Best Band of the year from Ninentertain Award 2015
- The Guitar Man Of The Year (Ruzz Pikatpairee from "Song Kram Yen" song) from The Guitar Mag Awards 2021
- TOTY Music Award 2022
  - Nominated in the best album of the year "Ruen Prae No. 6"
  - Nominated in the best recording "SuperCarcare" produced by Ruzz Pikatpairee
  - Nominated in the best band of the year
- The Best Band of the year from The Guitar Mag Award 2024
