= Death and funeral of Sirikit =

2025 death of the queen mother of Thailand

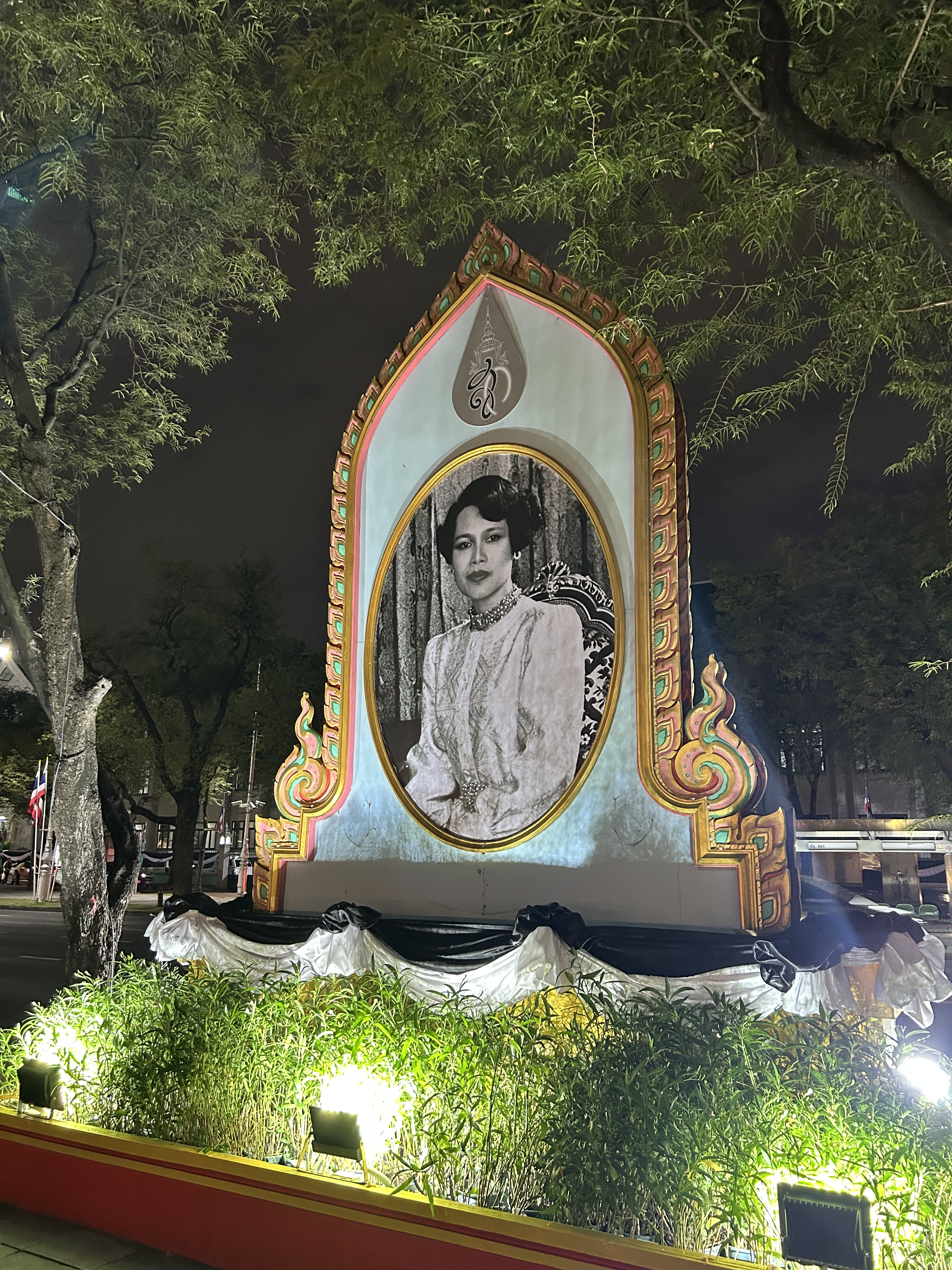
- Date: 24 October 2025 at 21:21 (UTC+7) (death)
- Location: Bhumisiri Mangalanusorn Building, King Chulalongkorn Memorial Hospital, Bangkok (death)

Sirikit, the queen mother of Thailand, died on 24 October 2025 at 9:21 p.m. at the King Chulalongkorn Memorial Hospital in Bangkok. The government announced a one-year period of mourning. The Bureau of the Royal Household held the royal funeral ceremonies from 26 October 2025 at the Dusit Maha Prasat Throne Hall, Grand Palace.

== Background ==
After attending the Vesak, which coincides with the 2600th anniversary of the Buddha's enlightenment, at Sanam Luang in June 2012, and visiting the Queen Sirikit Museum of Textiles on 11 July 2012, Sirikit felt unsteady and staggered while exercising at Siriraj Hospital on 21 July 2012. After performing magnetic resonance imaging, a team of physicians determined that she had suffered an ischemic stroke. She suspended public duties as a result of her illness. The following year, she accompanied her husband, King Bhumibol Adulyadej, to reside at Klai Kangwon Palace. Royal physicians later determined that Sirikit had tendon inflammation and therefore provided medication and physical therapy.

After the death of her husband, Sirikit accompanied Bhumibol's body from Siriraj Hospital to the Grand Palace on 14 October 2016. In 2019, physicians requested Sirikit to move to King Chulalongkorn Memorial Hospital, operated by the Thai Red Cross Society, for further observation and medical examinations.

On her birthday in 2020, King Vajiralongkorn, Queen Suthida and other members of the royal family attended Sirikit's private merit-making ceremony at Bhumisiri Mangalanusorn Building, King Chulalongkorn Memorial Hospital. Two years later, on the occasion of her 90th birthday, she performed a private merit-making ceremony at the same location.

== Death ==
External videos
- Announcement of the death of Queen Sirikit on the Television Pool of Thailand

The Bureau of the Royal Household announced Sirikit's death on 24 October 2025. The announcement stated she had experienced several illnesses while staying at the King Chulalongkorn Memorial Hospital, and the royal medical team detected abnormalities in various bodily systems, requiring continuous treatment. From 17 October 2025, she became critically ill with sepsis. Her condition gradually worsened, and she died on 24 October 2025 at 21:21, at the age of 93.

== Funeral ceremonies ==
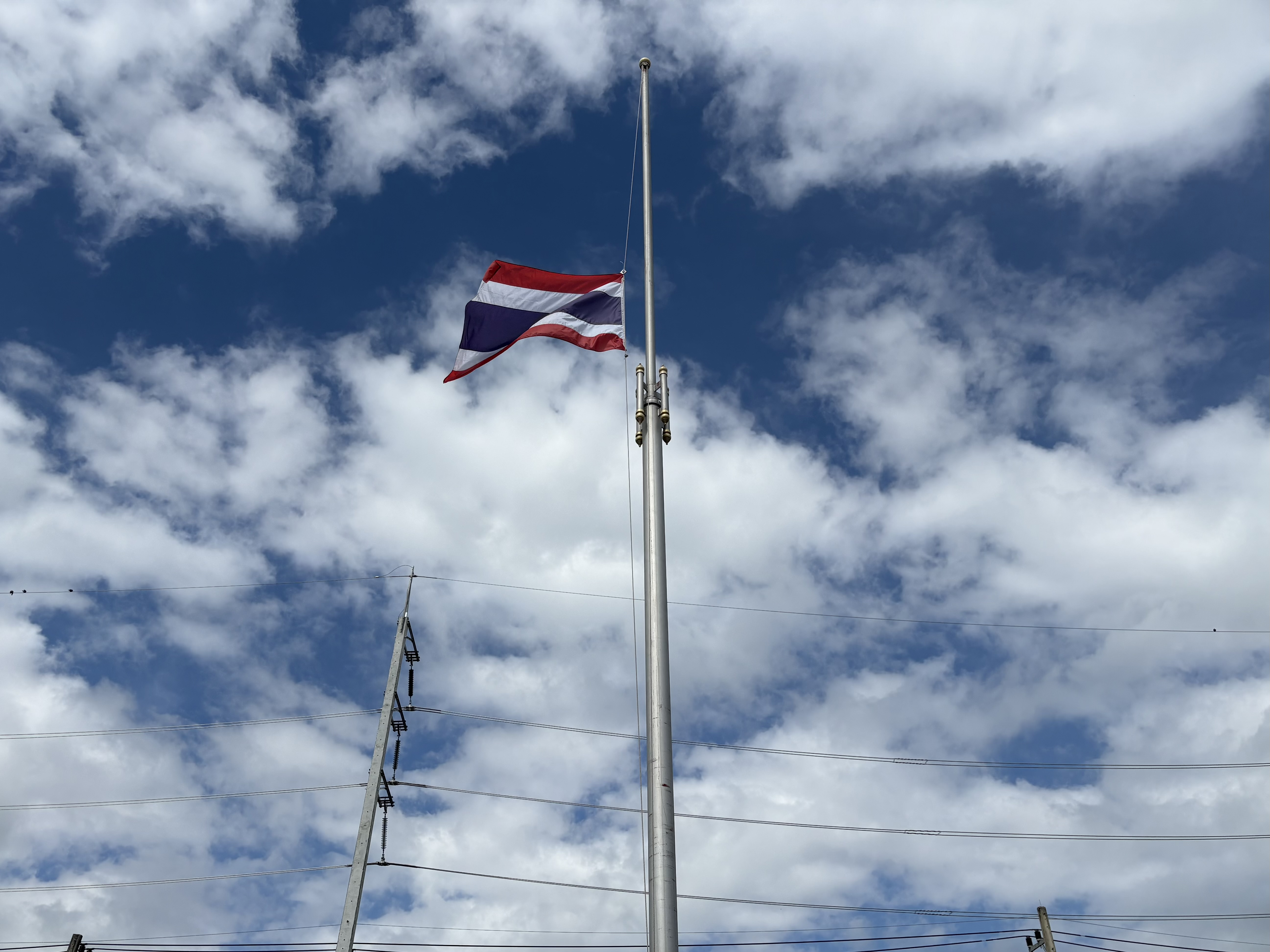
A Thai national flag flying at half-mast on 26 October 2025 at a hospital in Si Samrong

=== Royal funeral procession to the Grand Palace ===
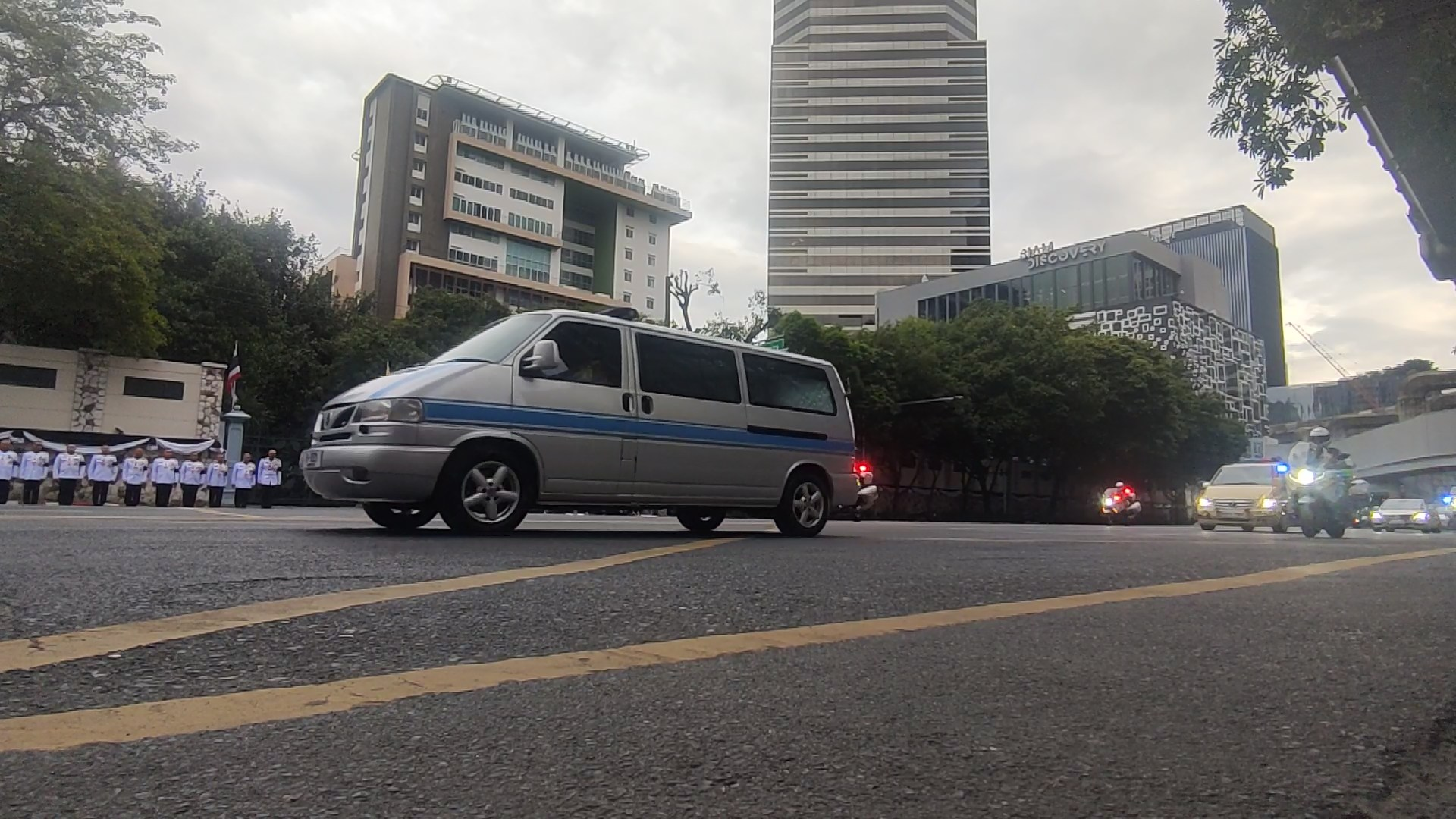
Queen Sirikit's coffin was carried to the Grand Palace in a gray 2001 Volkswagen Caravelle T4.

On 26 October 2025 at 15:42, members of the royal family, including King Vajiralongkorn and Queen Suthida, proceeded from Amphorn Sathan Residential Hall, Dusit Palace, to the King Chulalongkorn Memorial Hospital. They then entered the Bhumisiri Mangalanusorn Building and proceeded to the 29th floor, where several royals awaited to pay respects. Following this, Somdet Phra Maha Virawong (Suchin Aggajino), Chief of the Dhammakaya Monastic Division, together with the assistant abbot of Wat Ratchabophit, led the procession to transfer the royal coffin of Sirikit from the building and place it onto a gray 2001 Volkswagen Caravelle T4 with a blue stripe, registration number 1D-0929 Bangkok, also known as the "James Bond" vehicle. The same vehicle was used for King Bhumibol Adulyadej's funeral procession in 2016.

Sirikit's funeral procession began at 16:26 on the same day. The procession was led by the car of Somdet Phra Maha Virawong, followed by the vehicle carrying the royal urn, and then the royal carriages of Vajiralongkorn, Suthida, and other members of the royal family. The procession departed from Chulalongkorn Hospital and proceeded along Henri Dunant Road, Rama IV Road, Phaya Thai Road, Si Ayutthaya Road, Ratchadamnoen Road, and Na Phra Lan Road, entering the Grand Palace through the Wiset Chai Si Gate. The procession then arrived at Phiman Rattaya Throne Hall, where additional members of the royal family were present to receive the royal urn. The entire procession took 38 minutes, arriving at 17:04.

=== Presentation of the Royal Nine-Tiered Umbrella ===
To bestow the highest honor and express filial reverence toward Sirikit, King Vajiralongkorn presented the Royal Nine-Tiered Umbrella to be placed over the royal symbolic urn, in accordance with her royal title as "Queen Mother" and in recognition for her many years as queen and mother to a nation. She became the first female member of the royal family or court to be presented with the Royal Nine-Tiered Umbrella, which is normally reserved only for fully-crowned kings of Thailand.

=== Preparations for the Royal Funeral and Cremation ===
Alongside the lying in state in the Grand Palace's Dusit Maha Prasat Hall is the ongoing preparations for the royal funeral and cremation ceremonies, which will happen in late 2026 in conjunction with the first anniversary of the former Queen's passing and will climax with the cremation itself in the temporary crematorium complex in Sanam Luang in central Bangkok. Organization and coordination work for this is shared with the Bureau of the Royal Household, the Ministry of Culture via its Fine Arts Department, and various other governmental agencies.

The preparations began on 6 November, when the Princess Royal presided over an official ceremony at the Bangkok National Museum to bless the royal funeral chariots to be used in the ceremonies and formally commence the needed repair, maintenance and upgrading work needed for the chariots, the pallanquins and the pulleys to be used come funeral day.

In September 2026, the official cremation ceremony was launched, with 15-19 December set as the dates for the cremation and related events, with the 16th serving as the actual state cremation day.

== Participants ==
=== Thai Royal Family ===
- The King and Queen, the late Queen Mother's son and daughter-in-law
  - Princess Sirivannavari, the late Queen Mother's granddaughter
  - Prince Dipangkorn Rasmijoti, the late Queen Mother's grandson
- Princess Ubol Ratana, the late Queen Mother's daughter
  - Than Phu Ying Ploypailin Jensen and David Wheeler, the late Queen Mother's granddaughter and grandson-in-law
    - Maximus Wheeler, the late Queen Mother's great-grandson
    - Leonardo Wheeler, the late Queen Mother's great-grandson
    - Alexandra Wheeler, the late Queen Mother's great-granddaughter
  - Than Phu Ying Sirikitiya Jensen, the late Queen Mother's granddaughter
- The Princess Royal, the late Queen Mother's daughter
- The Princess Srisavangavadhana, the late Queen Mother's daughter
  - Princess Siribha Chudabhorn, the late Queen Mother's granddaughter
  - Princess Aditayadorn Kitikhun, the late Queen Mother's granddaughter
- The Royal Noble Consort, the late Queen Mother's daughter-in-law
- The Hon. Sirina and Piya Chittalan, the late Queen Mother's niece and her husband
  - Thara Chittalan, the late Queen Mother's great-niece
- The Hon. Nathapha Kitiyakara and Wuthisak Ratanasuwan, the late Queen Mother's niece and her husband
  - Suthakit Chirathiwat, the late Queen Mother's great-nephew
  - Sitthikit Chirathiwat, the late Queen Mother's great-nephew
- Than Phu Ying Suthawan and Professor Surakiart Sathirathai, the late Queen Mother's niece and her husband
  - Santithan and Chanathip Penjati Sathirathai, the late Queen Mother's great-nephew and his wife

==== Descendants of King Chulalongkorn ====
- The late Princess of Naradhiwas' family:
  - Captain Jitat Sornsongkram, the late Queen Mother's great-nephew by marriage
- Prince Chalermsuk Yugala, the late Queen Mother's first cousin-in-law once removed
- Princess Bhanubandhu Yugala, widow of the late Queen Mother's first cousin-in-law
  - Prince and Princess Nawaphansa Yugala, the late Queen Mother's first cousin-in-law once removed and his wife
  - Princess Bhanuma and Meth Phiphitphokha, the late Queen Mother's first cousin-in-law once removed and her husband
- Princess Mongkolchalerm Yugala, widow of the late Queen Mother's first cousin-in-law once removed
- Princess Srisavangvongse Yugala, the late Queen Mother's first cousin-in-law once removed
- Prince and Princess Dighambara Yugala, the late Queen Mother's first cousin-in-law once removed and his wife
- Princess Chatrichalerm Yugala, wife of the late Queen Mother's first cousin-in-law once removed
- Princess Nobhadol Chalermsri Yugala, the late Queen Mother's first cousin-in-law once removed

==== Descendants of King Mongkut ====
- Princess Udayakanya Bhanubandhu, the late Queen Mother's second cousin-in-law

== Gallery ==
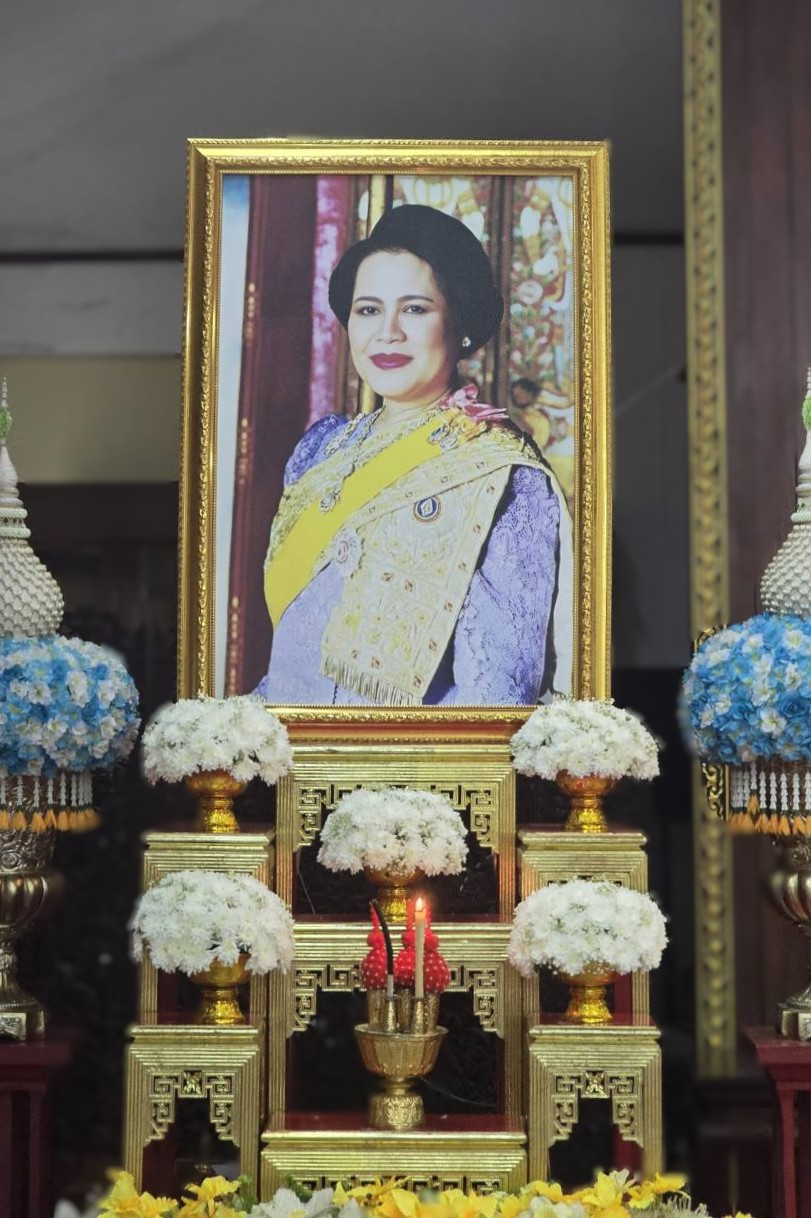
Picture of the Queen Mother with small set of golden ceremonial vessels.

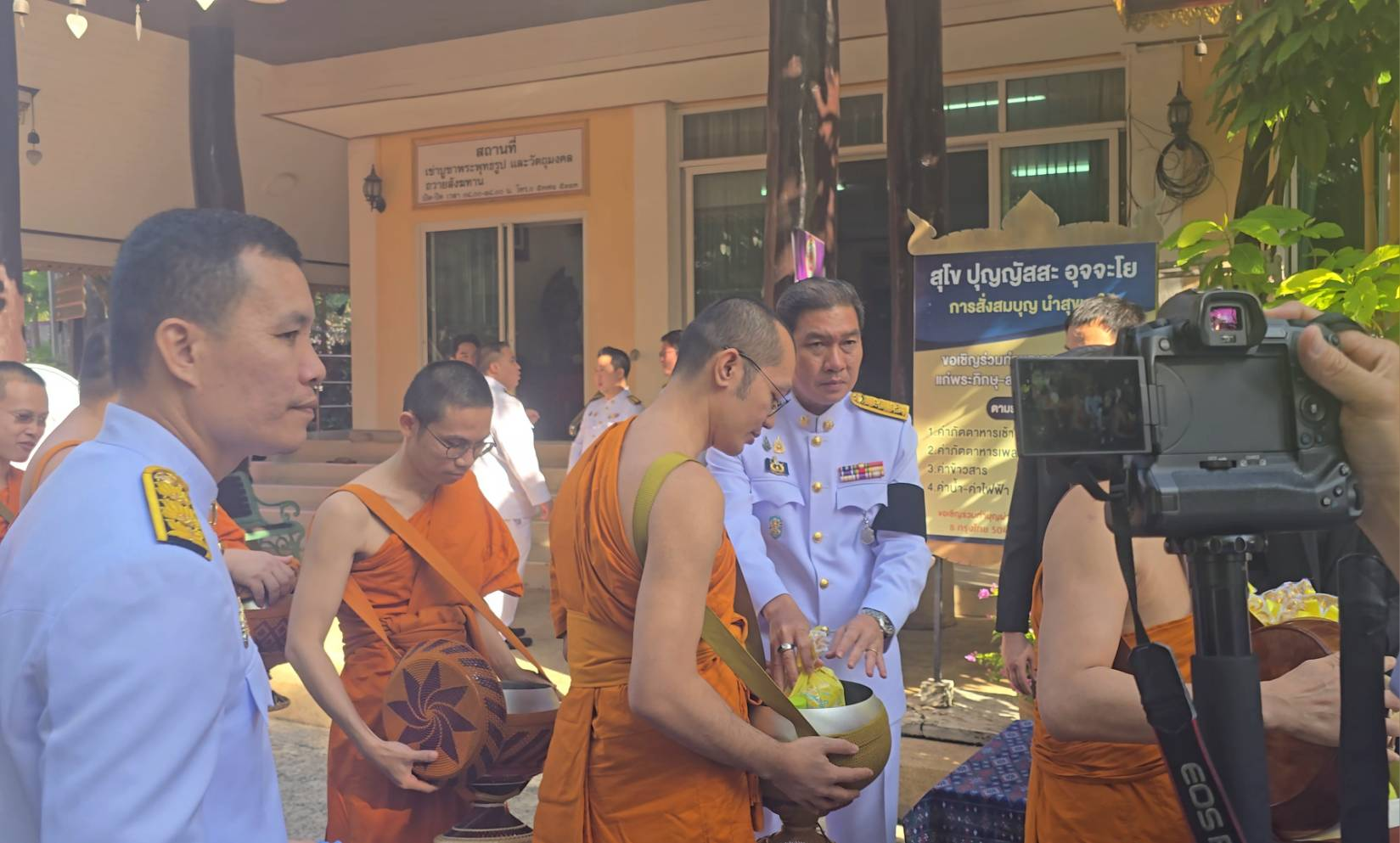
Sattamavara Merit-Making Ceremony (completed 7 days) to dedicate merit to the Queen Mother in Chiang Rai.

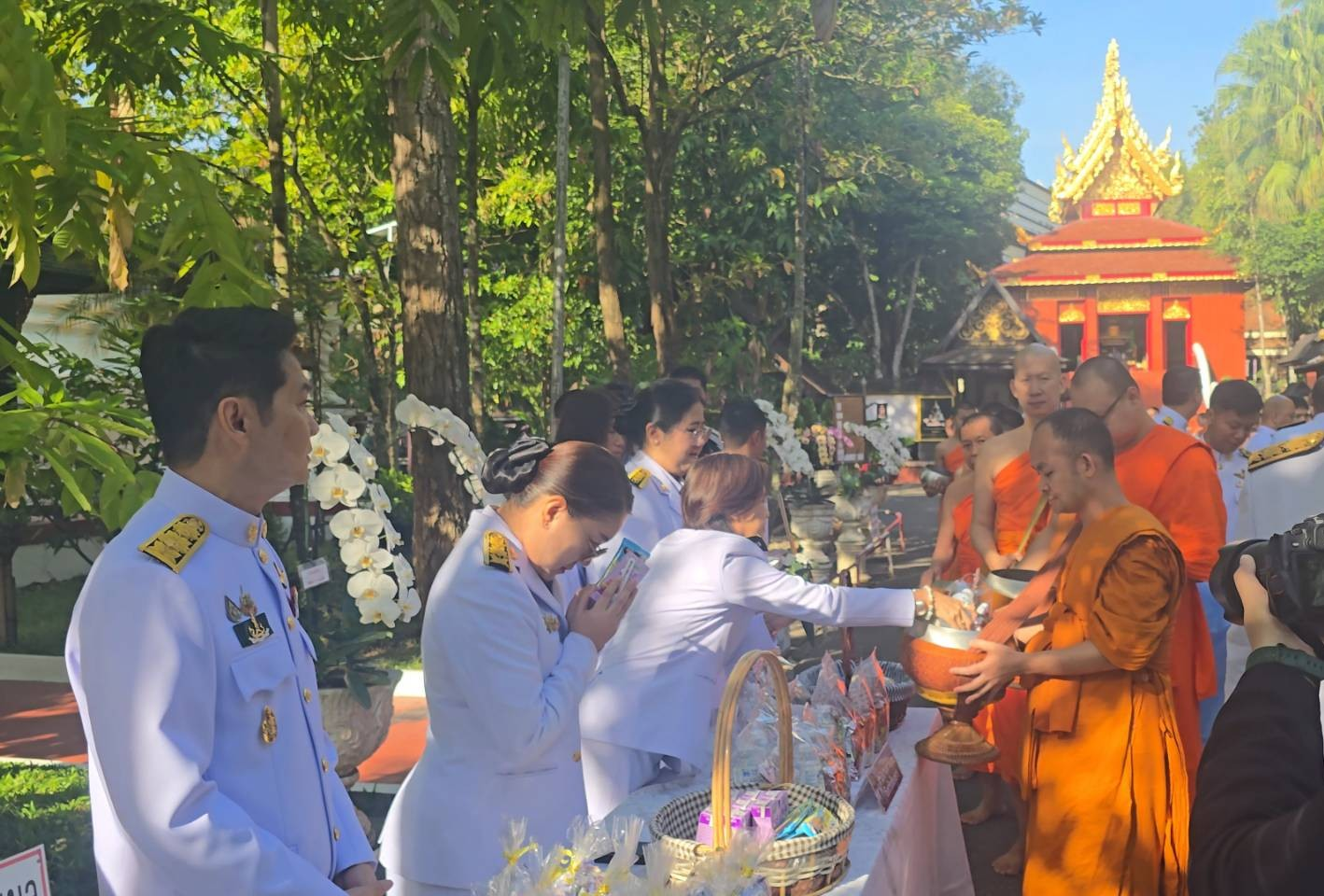
Sattamavara Merit-Making Ceremony (completed 7 days) to dedicate merit to the Queen Mother in Chiang Rai.

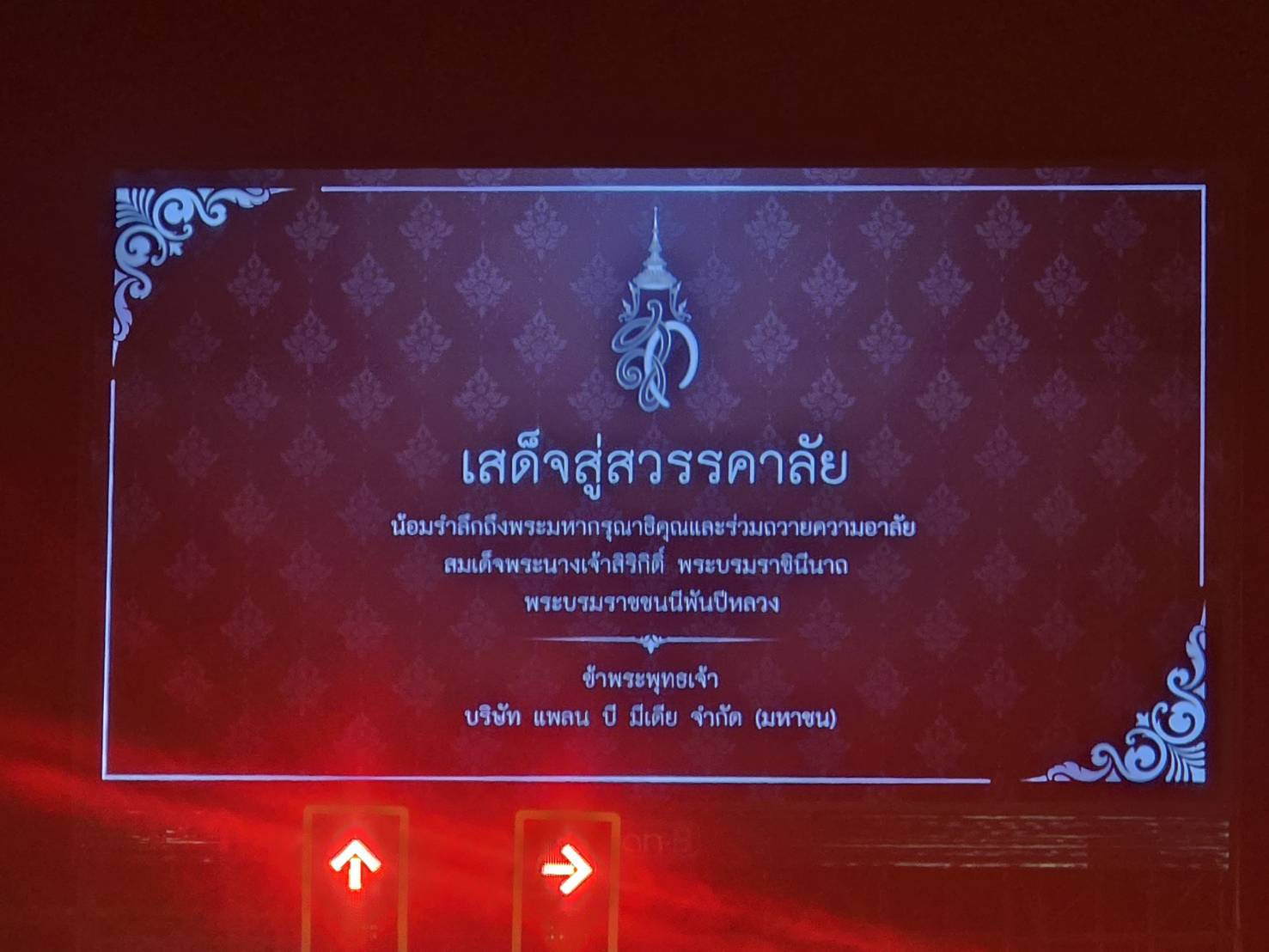
Mourning billboard for the Queen Mother in Chiang Rai.

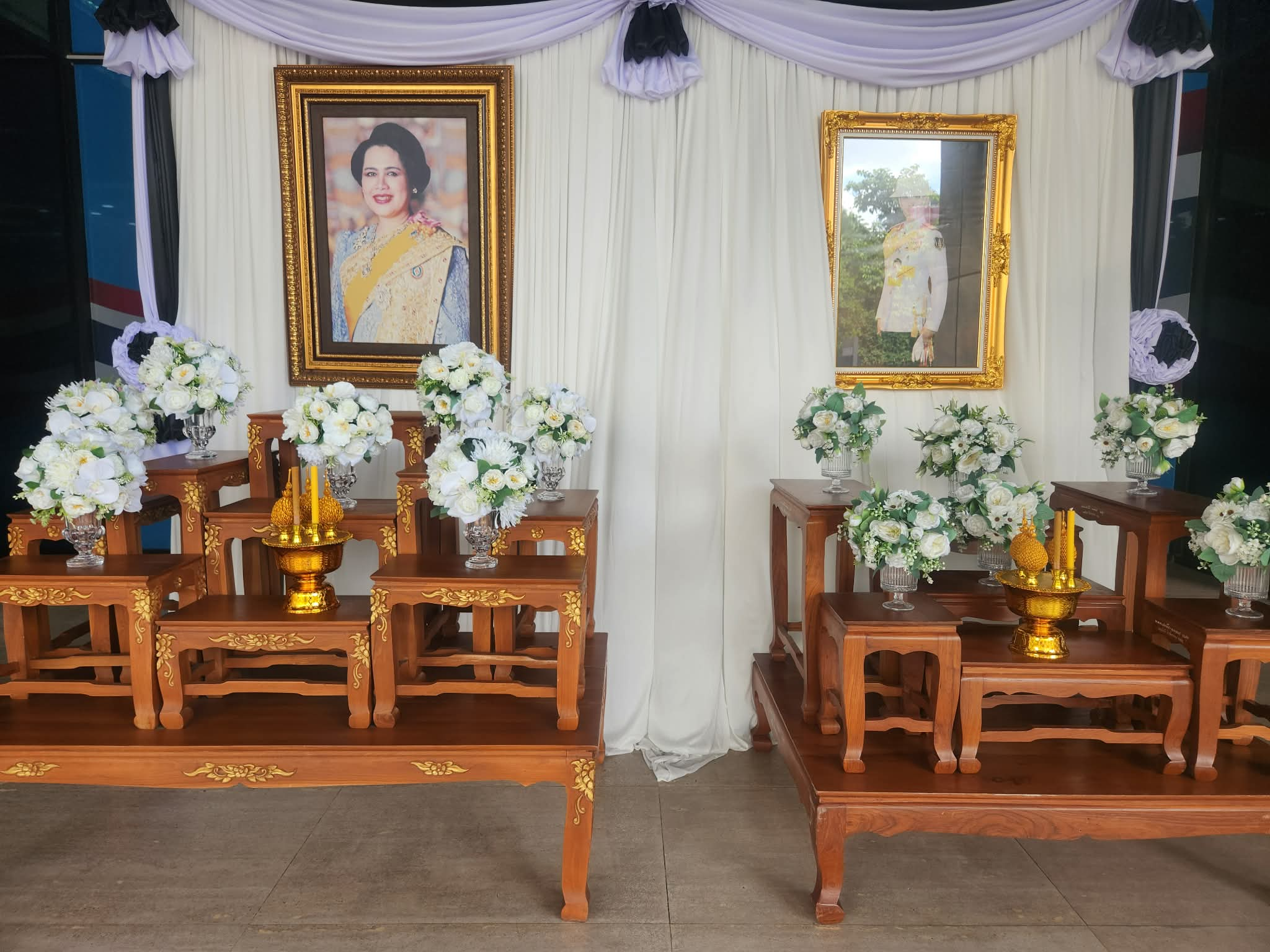
A Thai government agency set up altars to mourn the passing of Queen Sirikit the Queen Mother and Princess Bajrakitiyabha in June 2026.
