= Khon Kaen Wittayayon School =

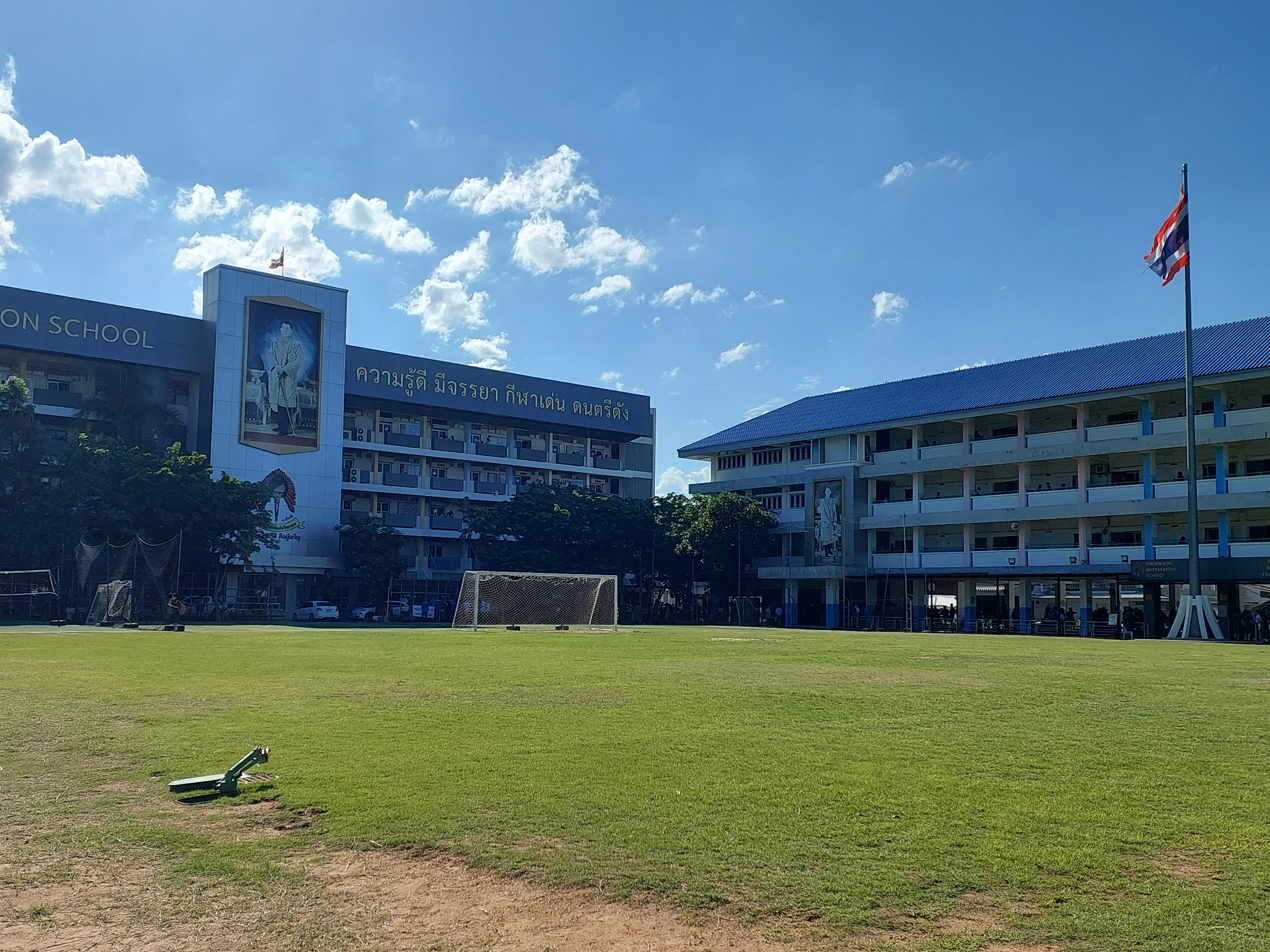
- The school’s 7th building (left), the 11th building, and the national flag (right).

Location
- 58 Klangmuang Rd., Muang District, Khon Kaen, 40000; Thailand; 16°25′55″N 102°50′06″E

Information
- Type: Public
- Motto: Suvijāno bhavaṃ hoti (He who knows well will progress.)
- Established: 1897
- School board: Khon Kaen Education Service Area Office 1
- Authority: Office of the Basic Education Commission
- Director: Sakdadet Thachai
- Staff: 82 (2020 academic year)
- Teaching staff: 215 (2020 academi year)
- Grades: 7–12 (mathayom 1–6)
- Gender: Coeducational
- Enrollment: 4,601 (2020 academic year)
- Average class size: 55
- Student to teacher ratio: 107:5
- Classrooms: 114 (2020 academic year)
- Campus type: Urban
- Colours: Pink, blue and yellow
- Song: March Khon Kaen Wittayayon, Cherd-Choo, Saisampan, La-Wittayayon
- Mascot: Torch
- National ranking: 33th (2019 academic year)
- Website: https://www.kkw.ac.th

Khon Kaen Wittayayon School (Thai: โรงเรียนขอนแก่นวิทยายน) is a public school located in Khon Kaen Province, Thailand. It admits secondary students (mathayom 1–6, equivalent to grades 7–12). Founded in 1897 as a boys' school for Khon Kaen Province, it became the first coeducational school in Khon Kaen. The school's former names were "Khon Kaen (boys') School" and "That Wittayakhan Temple School". The school's first principal was Mr. Tub Chimma.

== Campus ==
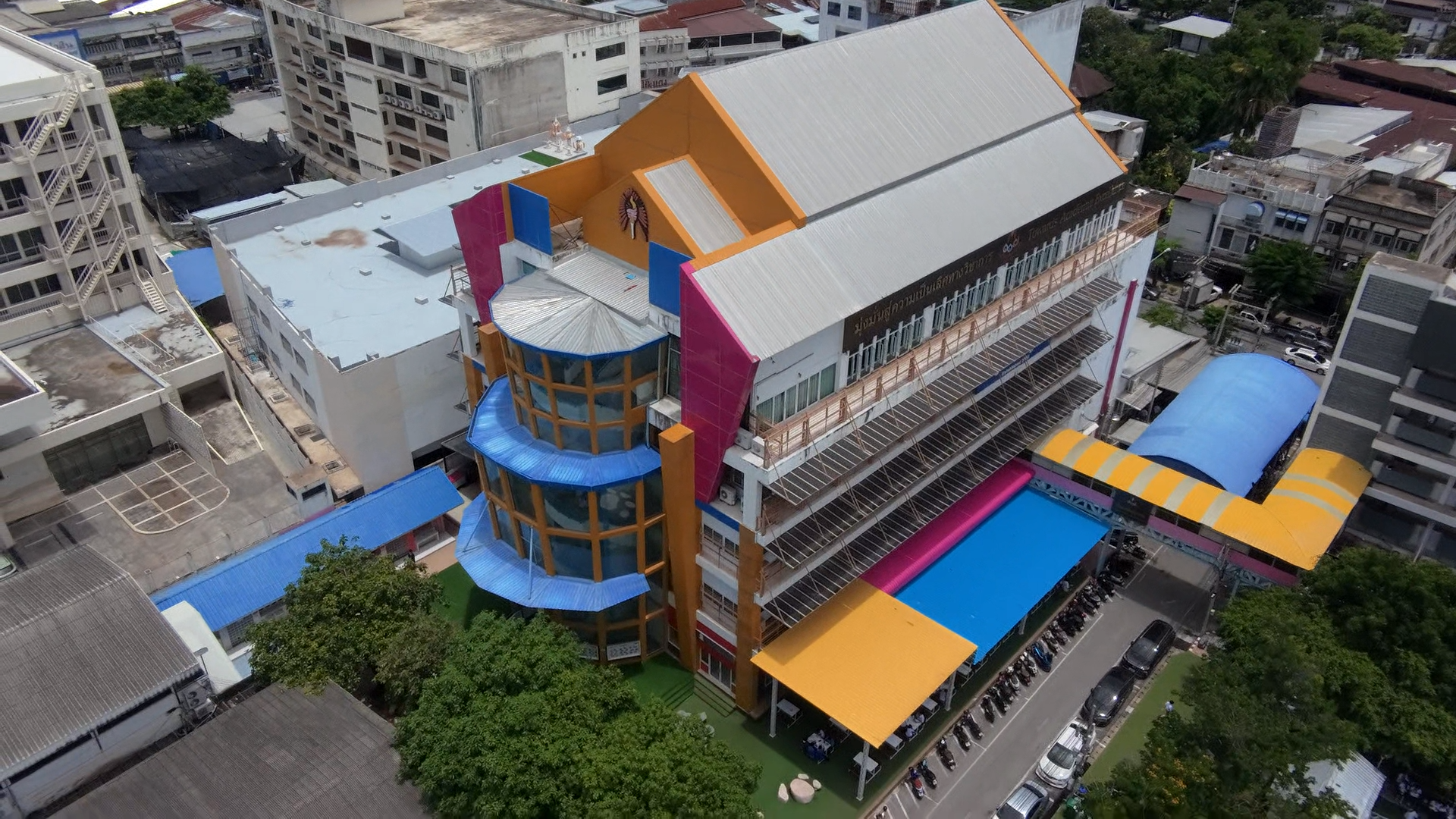
Building 10 of the school with building 7 to the right.

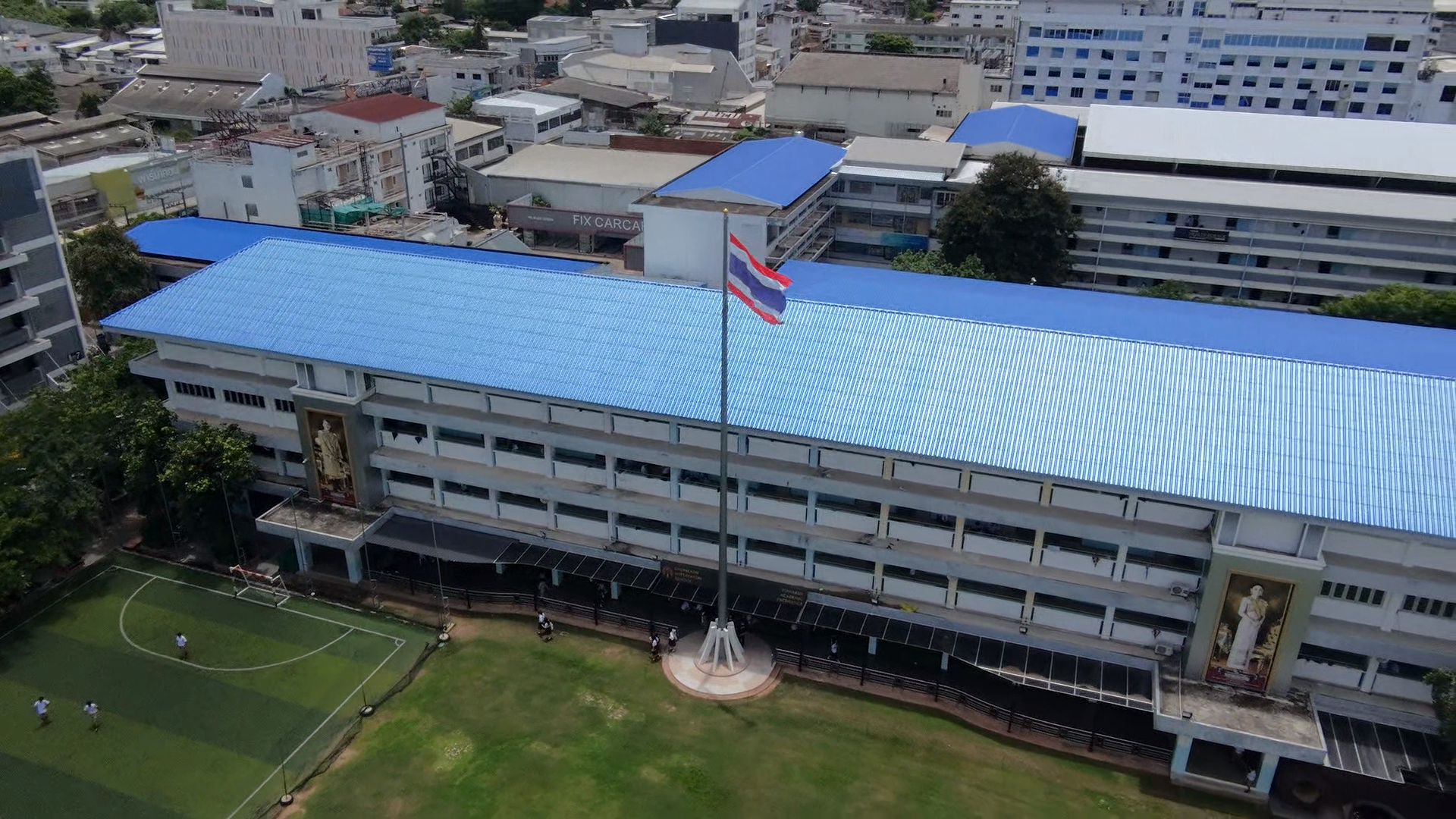
Building 11 of the school with flag (center)

The school occupies 22 rai 2 ngarn (36,000 square metres; 390,000 sq ft). It has eighteen buildings, eleven of which have classrooms. The oldest building, Building 1, dates from 1978, and is used by the Department of Science. Construction of Buildings 2 and 3 followed in 1980. These three buildings are the primary structures of the campus.

Building 7 was begun by the school board to celebrate the school's 100th anniversary, and it's the largest building in the school. Other classroom buildings are Buildings 4, 6, 8, and 9. Other buildings include the auditorium, library, agricultural building, public relations building, academic resources building, and the shrines.

== School Emblem ==
Pink-Blue-and Yellow, school colours

== Curriculum ==
The school follows the national Curriculum of Basic Education as of BE 2562 (2019 AD). Grouped into 11 areas:

=== Lower-secondary ===
- Science Mathematics Technology and Environment
- Premium Math / Premium Science
- Platinum Classroom
- Gold Classroom
- Gifted English Program

=== Upper-secondary ===
- Science Mathematics Technology and Environment
- Premium Math / Premium Science
- Platinum Classroom:
- Health Science
- Engineering
1. Law and Politics
2. Programmer
3. Second Language Art
- Third Language Art (Chinese/Japanese-Spanish)
- Gold Classroom
- English Program:
1. Language Program (English-Chinese-Japanese-German)
2. Science-Mathematics Program

Subjects are grouped in 9 areas: Science and Technology, Mathematics, Thai, Social Studies and Religion, Foreign Languages, Arts, Vocations, Physical and Health Education

== Heads of School ==
Principals
Names	Years in Office
1. Tub Chimma (ทับ ฉิมมา)	1897—1907
2. Pisan-arunyaketr (พระครูพิศาลอรัญเขตร์)	1908—1910
3. Nath Intu-smit (ราชบุรุษนารถ อินทุสมิต)	1911—1924
4. Pon Pontosa (ผล ผลโตษะ)	1915—1916
5. Cheuy Intumarn (ราชบุรุษเฉย อินทุมาน) Acting Principal	1916—1917
6. Un Theerasirichot (อั้น ธีระศิริโชติ)	1918—1925
7. Thom Kunkpech (ถม ขรรค์เพชร)	1926
8. Pleung Intu-smit (รองอำมาตย์ตรีเปลื้อง อินทุสมิต)	1927—1928
9. Kunsoonthornkarunyasuksathikarn (ขุนการัญศึกษาธิการ)	1929
10. Sitthi Bunditwong (สิทธิ์ บัณฑิตวงษ์) Acting Principal	1930
11. Singh Warichayanont (สิงห์ วาริชยานนท์)	1931—1932
12. Kumbor Dechkunchon (คำบ่อ เดชกุญชร)	1933—1940
13. Sitthi Bunditwong (สิทธิ์ บัณฑิตวงษ์)	1941—1953
14. Ngern Rattanajunt (เงิน รัตนจันท)	1953—1962
Headmasters
Names	Years in Office
15. Suchart Sukakunya (สุชาติ สุขากันยา)	1963—1964
16. Chuea Maiycharoeun (เจือ หมายเจริญ)	1964—1969
17. Saung Yuwakarn (ทรวง ยุวกาญจน์)	1969—1973
Directors
Names	Years in Office
18. Sanitpong Nuanmanee (สนิทพงษ์ นวลมณี)	1973—1980
19. Diloke Watjanasoonthorn (ดิลก วัจนสุนทร)	1980—1984
20. Luan Woranuch (ล้วน วรนุช)	1984—1988
21. Kunchit Tranucharattana (ครรชิต ตรานุชรัตน์)	1988—1989
22. Sawat Phukumsaen (สวาท ภูคำแสน)	1989—1995
23. Chumpon Wiangperm (ชุมพล เวียงเพิ่ม)	1995—2000
24. Pradit Sumrarnpat (ประดิษฐ์ สำราญพัฒน์)	2000—2008
25. Wichai Srisattayasodsana (วิชัย ศรีสัตย์รสนา)	2008—2015
26. Yutthasat Kongpet (ยุทธศาสตร์ กงเพชร)	2015—2021
27. Sakdadet Thachai (ศักดาเดช ทาซ้าย)	2021—2024
28. Boonluea Tongon (บุญเหลือ ทองอ่อน)	2024- 2026
29. Komsan Chumapai ( คมสันต์ ชาวไผ่)	2026- Present

== Notable alumni ==
- Politicians:
  - Pongsakorn Unnopporn, former Deputy Minister of Education
  - Somsak Kiatsuranont, former Deputy Speaker of the House of Representatives, former Minister of Culture, former Minister of Justice
  - Adisorn Piangked, former Deputy Minister of Education, former Minister for Science and Technology
  - Sarit Suntimeataneedol, PhD, former Deputy Minister of Education
  - Prasert Prakunsuksapun, Khon Kaen Senator.
- Police:
  - Pol. Gen. Wasit Dechkunchon, former Deputy Director-General of Thailand's national police, former Deputy Minister of Interior, writer
  - Pol. Gen. Wichian Pojphothisri, former Acting Commissioner-General of the Royal Thai Police
  - Pol. Maj. Gen. Wachira Thongwiseth, former Deputy Commissioner-General of the 4th region of the Royal Thai Police
- Military personnel:
  - Gen. Jarupat Ruangsuwan, former Associate Commissioner of the Election Commission
  - Gen. Maj. Sujarit Jirumpaikul, former Royal Thai Army Adviser
  - Gen. Maj. Chawanitya Kanchanatecha, former Royal Thai Army Adviser
- Civil servants:
  - Kwanchai Wasawong, former Deputy Secretary of the Ministry of Interior
  - Somporn Klinpongsa, former Deputy Secretary of the Ministry of Interior
  - Kawee Suppateera, former Governor of Khon Kaen Province, a former member of the House of Representatives
  - Associate Professor Intarachai Horwijit, PhD, former Vice President of Khon Kaen University
- Athletes:
  - Thanakorn Srichapun, former Thai tennis player
  - Budsababunn Prasaengkaew, former Thailand Volleyball player
- Entertainers:
  - Tono Pakin (The Star 6), actor, singer
  - Sitthichai Phapchompoo (Boy, AF 3), actor, singer
  - Thanachad Toollayachad (Arthie), film actor
  - Harin "Dim" Suthamjarad, lead singer of Tattoo Colour
  - Rath Pikadpiaree, singer and guitar player of Tattoo Colour
  - Aekkachai "Thong" Chodrungrojna, drum player of Tattoo Colour
  - Thanabordee "Jump" Theerapongpakdee, bass player of Tattoo Colour
  - Sudteerak "King" Bumrungyad, actor
- Media:
  - Kitti Singhaput, news correspondent
